= Katju =

Katju may refer to:

- Katju Nagar, West Bengal, India

== People with the surname ==
- Arundhati Katju (born 1982), lawyer qualified to practice in India and New York
- Brahma Nath Katju (born 1927), Indian judge and the Chief Justice of the Allahabad High Court
- Kailash Nath Katju (1887–1968), prominent politician of India
- Markandey Katju, an Indian jurist
- Shiva Nath Katju (1910–1996), Indian lawyer, judge and an Indian National Congress politician
