= Kharwa =

Kharwa may refer to:

- Kharwa caste, a fishing community of Gujarat, India
- Kharwa Kala, a village in Ratlam District of Madhya Pradesh, India
- Kharwa, Rajasthan, the former capital of the Panth Piploda province of British India
- Rao Gopal Singh Kharwa (1872–1939), the ruler of the Kharwa, Rajasthan
