= Shiva Nath Katju =

Indian politician

S. N. Katju

Judge, Allahabad High Court
- In office 1962–19??

Member, Uttar Pradesh Legislative Council
- In office 1958–1962

MLA, Uttar Pradesh Legislative Assembly
- In office 1952–1957
- Constituency: Phulpur Central

Personal details
- Born: 5 January 1910 Jaora, Jaora State, British India
- Died: 9 September 1996 (aged 86) Allahabad, Uttar Pradesh, India
- Party: Indian National Congress
- Children: Markandey Katju
- Parent: Kailash Nath Katju (father)
- Occupation: Lawyer, politician, activist

Shiva Nath Katju (5 January 1910 – 9 September 1996) was an Indian lawyer, judge and an Indian National Congress politician. He was a member of the Uttar Pradesh Legislative Assembly (1952–1957) and the Uttar Pradesh Legislative Council (1958–1962). He was also a judge at the Allahabad High Court, and a President of the Vishwa Hindu Parishad.

== Early life ==
Shiva Nath Katju was born on 5 January 1910 in Jaora, to Roopan and Kailash Nath Katju. He completed his primary education at the Bar High School in Jaora. Subsequently, his family moved to Allahabad, where he attended the City A.V. School, Government Intermediate College and the University of Allahabad.

== Career ==
S. N. Katju enrolled as an Advocate at the Allahabad High Court on 27 August 1932. He initially practised law in Kanpur, and then moved to Allahabad in July 1935. He mainly handled civil cases. In 1938–39, he became an Advocate at the Federal Court of India, a predecessor of the Supreme Court of India. He also worked as a part-time lecturer in law at the Allahabad University.

He was also politically active, and was a member of the Indian National Congress. In the 1952 Uttar Pradesh Legislative Assembly election, Katju was elected as a member from the Phulpur Central constituency. As an MLA, he opposed proposals to divide Uttar Pradesh into small states, on the grounds that it would promote separatism. In 1958, he became a member of the Uttar Pradesh Legislative Council, the upper house of the Uttar Pradesh legislature.

On 23 April 1962, he was appointed an Additional Judge at the Allahabad High Court for a duration of two years. On 23 July 1963, he was made a permanent judge.

== Activism ==
S. N. Katju was a noted Hindu nationalist activist. In the 1950s, he claimed that the tree worshipped as Akshayavat in the Patalpuri Temple of Allahabad Fort was only a log. The commander of the fort acknowledged his claim as true. Katju sought to put an end to this "deception and fraud practised on the Hindu public", but the District Magistrate of Allahabad decided in favour of maintaining status quo. In 1978, Katju became the President of the Varanasi branch of Bhagwan Gopinath Trust.

He was also a member of the Vishwa Hindu Parishad, and became its president in the late 1980s. As a VHP leader, he campaigned for the construction of a Hindu temple at the Ram Janmabhoomi in Ayodhya. He was put under house arrest during the height of this campaign.

== Personal life ==
Katju married Girja (1913–1938), and after her death, Raj Kumari (1912–2006). His brother Brahma Nath was a Chief Justice of the Allahabad High Court. His son Markandey became a Judge at the Supreme Court of India.
