= Shukteerth =

Pilgrimage town located in Muzaffarnagar district, Uttar Pradesh, India

Shukratal Shukteerth
- Coordinates: 29°29′20.83″N 77°59′24.03″E
- Country: India
- State: Uttar Pradesh

Shukteerth, also known as Shukratal, is a historically and religiously significant pilgrimage town located in Muzaffarnagar district, Uttar Pradesh, India. Situated roughly 28 kilometers from Muzaffarnagar city, Shukteerth is primarily known for its association with the Hindu epic.

According to tradition, Shukteerth is the place where Sage Shukdev narrated the sacred Bhagavad Purana (Srimad-Bhagavatam) to Maharaja Parikshit, the grandson of Arjuna and son of Abhimanyu, approximately 5,000 years ago. A large banyan tree, revered as the Akshayavat (undying tree), is believed to be the site where this recitation occurred. Devotees believe the tree possesses the unique characteristic of never shedding its leaves.

The main temple complex in Shukteerth houses the Shukdev Temple, dedicated to Sage Shukdev, and features beautifully carved idols of both Shukdev and King Parikshit. Additionally, a prominent landmark is the Hanuman Temple, known for enshrining one of the tallest outdoor statues of Lord Hanuman in the region, measuring 72 feet tall.
