= Badawada =

- city
- Location in Madhya Pradesh, India Badawada (India)
- Coordinates: 23°33′26″N 75°15′0″E
- Country: India
- State: Madhya Pradesh
- District: Ratlam

Population (2011)
  - Total: 8,700

Languages
  - Official: Hindi
- Time zone: UTC+5:30 (IST)
- ISO 3166 code: IN-MP
- Vehicle registration: MP

Badawada is a Nagar Panchayat city in district of Ratlam, Madhya Pradesh. Badawada is divided into 15 wards for which elections are held every 5 years.

Badawada Nagar Panchayat has total administration over 1,634 houses to which it supplies basic amenities like water and sewerage. It is also authorized to build roads within Nagar Panchayat limits and impose taxes on properties coming under its jurisdiction.

== Demographics ==
As of the 2011 Census of India, Badawada had a population of 8,700. Males constitute 51% of the population and females 49%. Badawada has an average literacy rate of 74.33%, above than the state average of 69.32%; with 84.81% of the males and 63.53% of females literate. 13.16% of the population is under 6 years of age.
