= Bilpank =

Village in Madhya Pradesh, India

- Interactive map of Bilpank
- Coordinates: 23.2270885°N 75.1350441°E
- Country: India
- State: Madhya Pradesh
- District: Ratlam

Population (2011)
  - Total: 3,431

Bilpank is a village in the Ratlam district, in the Indian state of Madhya Pradesh.

== Landmarks ==
An old Shiva temple is situated here.

== Demographics ==
According to the 2011 census, the village had a population of 3431, in 662 households.
