= Ravi Chary =

Indian sitar player (born 1965)

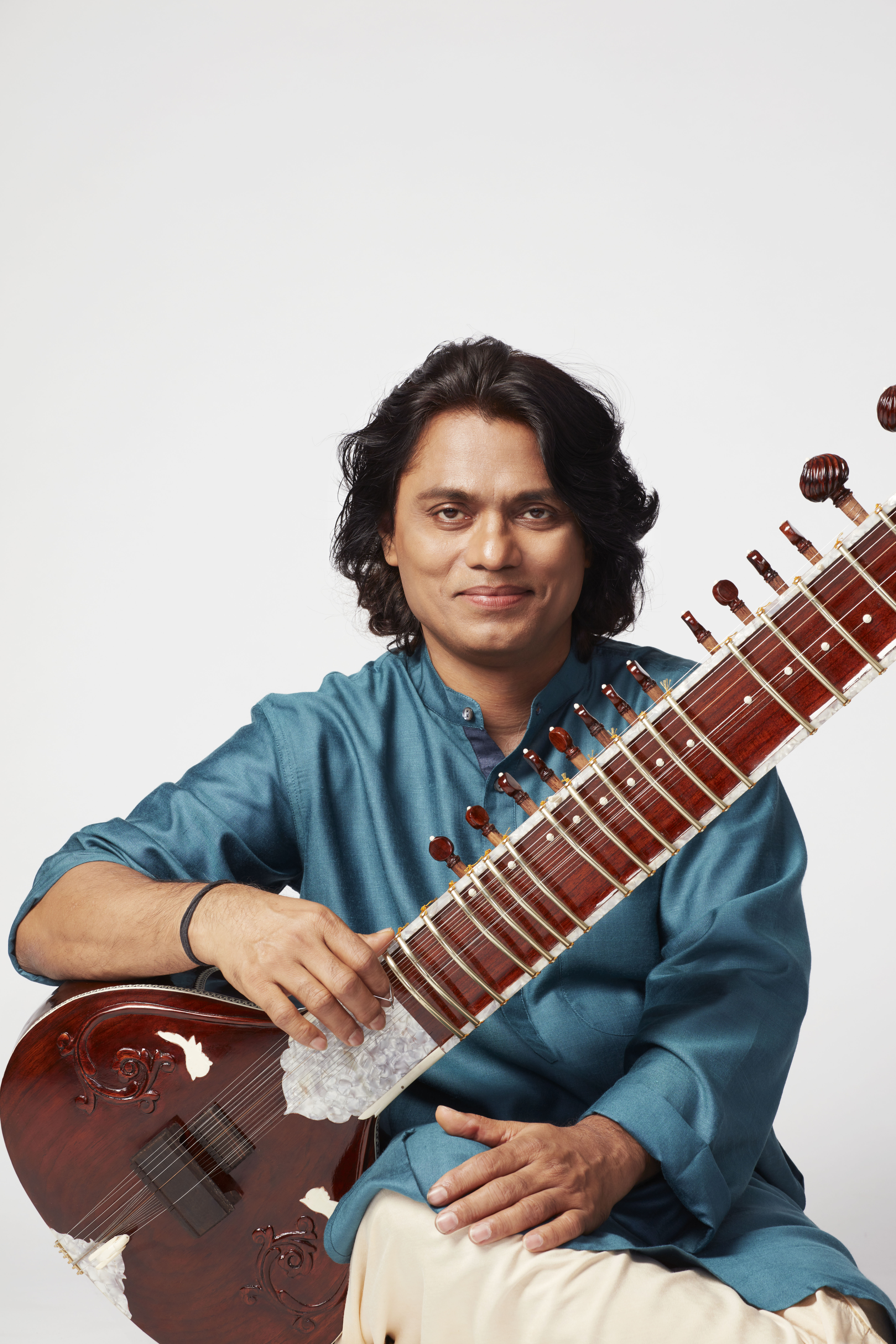
- Ravi Chary playing the sitar.

Background information
- Born: Ravindra Prabhakar Chary; 26 December 1965 (age 60)
- Origin: Panaji, Goa, India
- Genres: Hindustani Classical Music, Jazz, Fusion, World Music, Classical Music
- Occupation: Musician
- Instruments: Sitar, Harmonium
- Years active: 1990s–present
- Website: www.ravichary.com

Ravi Chary (Marathi: रवि चारी; born 26 December 1965) is an Indian sitar player known for his Hindustani Classical and experimental music. He studied music with his father, Prabhakar Chary, Abdul Karim Khan, Abdul Halim Jaffer Khan, and Shahid Parvez. He has been nominated for two Grammy Awards, for the albums Miles from India (2008) and Ravi Chary Crossing (2012).

== Background ==
Chary was born in Panaji, Goa to a family of musicians from the Chari and Sutar community of artists. His father, Prabhakar Chary, who was a musicologist and tabla maestro, began his musical training. His training continued in sitar at the Goa Kala Akademi with Professor Abdul Karim Khan of the Dharwad tradition of Rahimat Khan. Afterwards, he studied Jafferkhani baaj with Abdul Halim Jaffer Khan of the Indore tradition. He currently studies the Etawah tradition with Shahid Parvez.

== Career ==
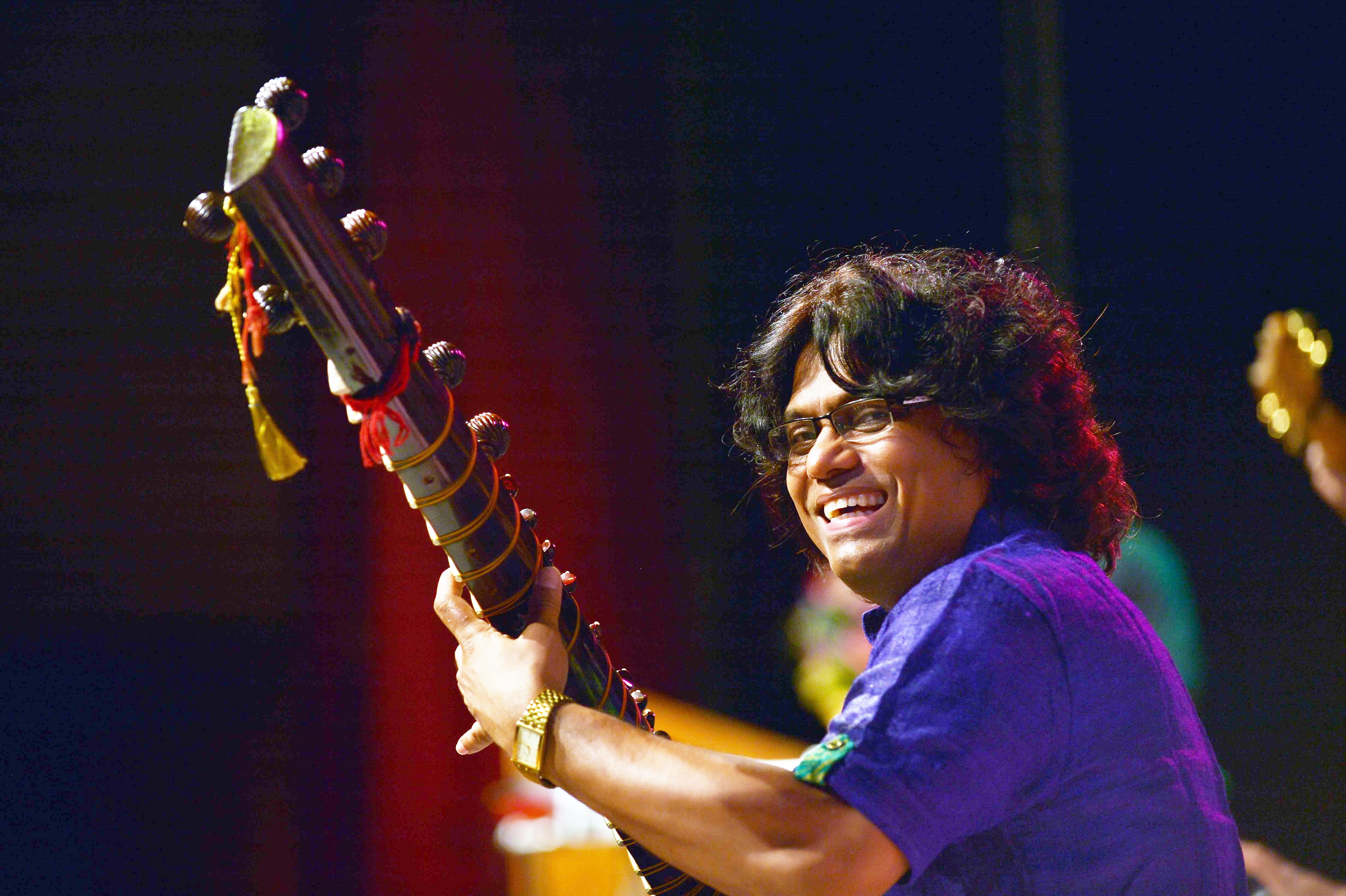
Ravi Chary in a live performance.

Chary has performed extensively across India as a soloist, fusion ensemble player, and jazz player. He has proven popular with audiences and performed alongside maestros like Alla Rakha, Kishori Amonkar, Sultan Khan, Suresh Talwalkar, Louis Banks, Sivamani, and others.

=== Teaching ===
Chary pioneered a sitar symphony featuring his leading students.

== Artistry ==
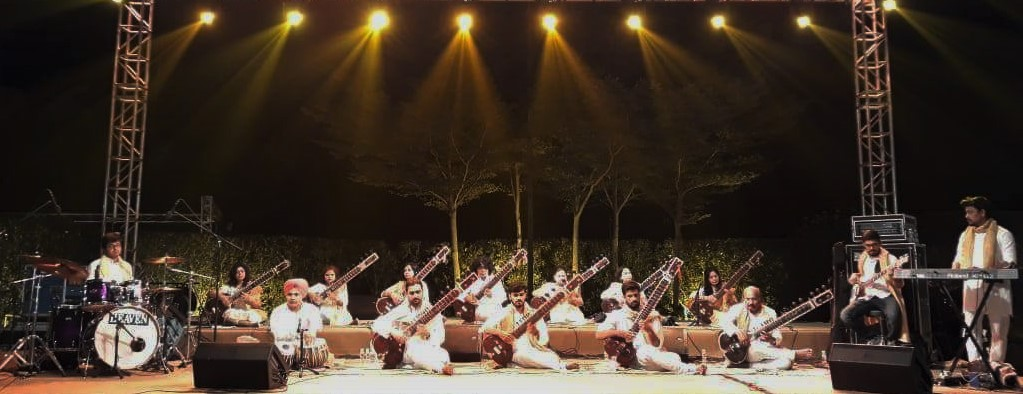
Ravi Chary leads his students in "Ravi Chary Sitar Symphony."

Critics have described Chary's performances as an "unforgettable experience." His albums have been received with critical acclaim.

== Awards and recognition ==
- Fellowship, Ministry of Human Resources Development (India)
- "Surmani Award," Sur Singar Samsad, Mumbai
- "Naad Chintamani Award"
- Grammy Award nomination, Miles from India
- Grammy Award nomination, Ravi Chary Crossing
