= Abdul Halim Jaffer Khan =

Indian musical artist (1927-2017)

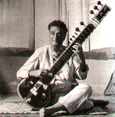

Background information
- Born: 18 February 1927; Jaora, Madhya Pradesh, India
- Died: 4 January 2017 (aged 89) Mumbai, India
- Genre: Hindustani classical music
- Occupations: Sitarist, Composer, Innovator, Author
- Instrument: sitar
- Label: Various
- Website: www.jafferkhanibaaj.com

Abdul Halim Jaffer Khan (18 February 1927 – 4 January 2017) was an Indian sitar player. Khan received the national awards Padma Shri (1970) and Padma Bhushan (2006) and was awarded the Sangeet Natak Akademi Award for 1987.

== Early life ==
Abdul Halim Jaffer Khan was born in 1927 in Jaora (35 km from Ratlam, Madhya Pradesh) as the son of Jaffer Khan, a versatile vocalist, sitarist and beenkar. He belonged to the Beenkar Gharana of Indore and was an All India Radio artiste beginning in the early 1940s. A few years before the Beatles met Ravi Shankar, in 1958, Khan collaborated with jazz pianist and composer Dave Brubeck. Brubeck who was in Bombay through the U.S. State Department sponsored Jazz Ambassadors Program, was impressed by the improvisation in Indian music and said that the experience accompanying Halim Jaffer Khan led him to play in a different way. Brubeck says of that meeting, "We understood each other." Khan also performed with the noted English classical guitarist Julian Bream in 1963.

== Career ==
Khan is known for his own style Jafferkhani Baaj. He describes it as, "a synthesis of precision in technique, systematic thought" with a vigorous playing style. Cultural anthropologist and reader at the University of Mumbai, Dr. Kamala Ganesh states: "His music making is full of eclectic yet deeply informed choices. He is a thinking musician but puts across his complex views with a simplicity and feeling which demarcate the articulate performer from the articulate theoretician.... In him, one gets an unmistakable sense... a syncretic tradition". The Indian santoor player Shivkumar Sharma remembers of Khan's performance of the raga Chhayanat: "It was probably in 1955–56, I was relaxing in my terrace in Jammu. In the stillness of the night I heard the notes of Raga Chhayanat on the sitar emanate from my neighbor's radio. I immediately noticed that the tone of the sitar was completely different and the style of playing radically unique. I rushed to switch on my radio.... I was totally engrossed and was very curious to know who this maestro was."

Khan has been credited with bringing Carnatic ragas Kirwani, Kanakangi, Latangi, Karaharapriya, Manavati, Ganamurti, and others into the sitar repertoire, rendering them through a Hindustani sensibility and in the Jafferkhani style. He was the first Hindustani musician to collaborate with Carnatic music in a performance with renowned Veena player Emani Sankara Sastry.

Khan was also involved with Indian cinema. Music Director Khwaja Khurshid Anwar introduced him to the Hindi film industry in 1946 at the age of 17 when he played sitar in the songs of film Parwana. He also composed and played for films like Mughal-e-Azam, Jhanak Jhanak Payal Baaje (1971), Goonj Uthi Shehnai (1959), Kohinoor (1960) and collaborated with noted music directors such as Vasant Desai, C. Ramachandra, Madan Mohan and Naushad who has said, "he not only enriched film music, but his participation lent prestige to my songs." Music critic for the Times of India, Amarendra Dhaneshwar described Khan's playing as, "Sitar virtuosity at its peak."

In 1976, Abdul Halim Jaffer Khan established Halim Academy of Sitar, India's first sitar academy in Bombay (now Mumbai), Maharashtra, with Chief Minister Yashwantrao Chavan as its inaugural Chief Guest

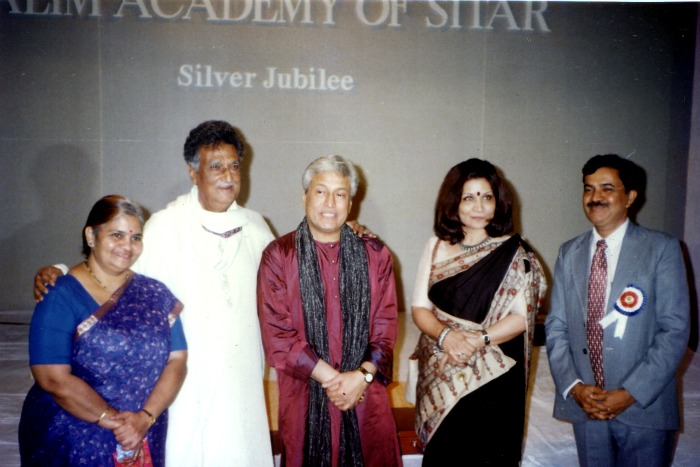
Sitarist Abdul Halim Jaffer Khan at the Halim Academy of Sitar with Chief guest, Sarodist Amjad Ali Khan, and Chair of Dr. Sushilarani-Baburao Patel Trust, Neela Shinde

== Death ==
Abdul Halim Jaffer Khan died on 4 January 2017, at his home in Mumbai, India, from cardiac arrest, aged 89.

== Legacy ==
Khan trained several prominent sitar players, including is son Zunain Halim Jaffer Khan who is the torchbearer of Jafferkhani Baaj, as well as other sitarists such as Ravi Chary.

== Works and awards ==
=== Select awards ===
- Tagore Fellow of Sangeet Natak Akademi in 2012
- Hanumant Sanman Murari Bapu, 2010
- Godavari Gaurav Kusumagraj Pratishthan, Nashik, 2010
- Padma Bhushan Government of India 2006
- Pillar of Hindustani Society TACCI, Mumbai, 2006
- Lifetime Achievement Award, Legends of India, 2005
- Giants International Award, 2004
- Kala Ratna Mumbai, 2003
- Swarsagar Award (PCMP), Pimpri-Chinchwad, 2003
- Acharya Pt. Ramnarain Foundation Award, Mumbai, 2002
- Sharda Ratna Mumbai, 2002
- Tansen Samman, Gwalior, 2000
- Sangeet Research Academy ITC-SRA Award, Mumbai, 2000
- Srestha Kala Acharya, 1998
- Nada Nidhi Avadhoota Datta Peetham, Mysore, 1998
- Haafiz Ali Khan Award Haafiz Ali Khan Memorial Trust, 1992
- Swar Sadhana Ratna Award, Mumbai, 1992
- Shikhar Samman Government of Madhya Pradesh, 1991
- Gaurav Puraskar, Government of Maharashtra, 1990
- Sangeet Natak Akademi Award, Delhi, 1987
- Ustad Allauddin Sangeet Ratna Bhopal, 1986
- Civil Medal awarded by the Mayor of Bombay, 1985
- Tantri Vilas, Sur Singar Samsad, Mumbai, 1984
- "Silver Tanpura," AICC Delhi, 1975
- Padma Shri, Government of India, 1970
- Hzt Amir Khusrau Gold Medal, Hyderabad, 1959
- Gold Medal, Bombay State Music Conference, 1956
- "Silver Sitar," Hyderabad, 1955
- Gold Medal All Bengal Music Conference, 1953

=== Media ===
Narrated by violinist Yehudi Menuhin, Deben Bhattacharya's film Raga features a young virtuosic Halim Jaffer Khan playing raga Sindh Bhairavi.

=== Select discography ===
- 75th Celebration Swar Sadhna (Raag Zila Kafi)
- 70th Birthday Release (Raag Tilak Kamod, Raag Jaijaiwanti, Raag Sindhi Bhairavi)
- Columbia (EP) (Raag Mand, Raag Ahir Bhairav)
- Enchanting Sitar (Raag Aarabi, Raag Multani)
- Guzra Zamana (Live in Concert- 1968) (Raag Abhogi)
- His Master's Voice (EP) (Chakra dhun, Thumri in Deepchandi taal)
- Immortal Series: Vol 1 (Raag Pahadi, Raag Kedar); Vol 2 (Raag Kirwani, Raag Jaunpuri)
- Instrumental Classical: Sitar (Raag Jaijaiwanti, Raag Sindhi Bhairavi)
- Lilting Strings (Raag Bhairavi, Raag Gaud Sarang, Raag Kamod, Raag Rageshri, Raag Shyam Kalyan, Raag Yaman Kalyan)
- Live in Jaipur 1968
- A Night at the Valley (Raag Kirwani, Raag Marwa, Raag Pahadi, Chakradhun, Thumri)
- Sangeet Suman (Raag Patdeep, Raag Shyam Kedar)
- Sitar Quintet (Raag Chandani Kedar, Raag Mazamiri, Raag Khusravani, Raag Sharavati, Raag Kalpana, Raag Miya ki Malhaar)
- Sitar Through the Ages [Soofiyana rang, Raag Bhimpalasi, Raag Zila Kafi, Raag Farghana]
- Sitar Ecstasy [Raag Hemavati, Raag Jaitshri, Sufiana Sama (dhun)]
- Theme on Strings (Raag Saraswat Ranjani, Sitar Anjuman, Hulban)
- Ustad Abdul Halim Jaffer Khan (Raag Champakali, Raag Chhaya Nat, Raag Mishra Pilu)
- Ustad Abdul Halim Jaffer Khan (Raag Jaunpuri, Raag Rajeshwari, Raag Anand Bhairav, Thumri)
- Ustad Abdul Halim Jaffer Khan (Raag Araj, Raag Madhyami)
- Ustad Abdul Halim Jaffer Khan (Raag Marwa, Raag Pahadi)
