= Muhammad Ismail of Jaora =

Nawab of Jaora, India, and honorary major in the British army

Muhammad Ismail (r. 1865–1895), was the Nawab of Jaora in India and an honorary major in the British Army. His son, Iftikhar Ali Khan, a minor at his accession, was educated at Daly College at Indore, with a British officer for his tutor, and received powers of administration in 1906.
