= Piploda =

- Town
- Location in Madhya Pradesh, India Piploda (India)
- Coordinates: 23.60°N 74.94°E
- Country: India
- State: Madhya Pradesh
- District: Ratlam

Government
  - City Council Head: Shyambihari Patel
- Elevation: 470 m (1,540 ft)

Population (2001)
  - Total: 7,302

Languages
  - Official: Hindi
- Time zone: UTC+5:30 (IST)
- ISO 3166 code: IN-MP
- Vehicle registration: MP

Piploda is a town and a Nagar Parishad in Ratlam district in the Indian state of Madhya Pradesh.

== History ==
Before Indian independence, Piploda was the capital of the princely state of the same name. It was ruled by Rajputs of the Dodiya clan. The state had an area of 91 km². Piploda was a dependency of Jaora state until 1924, when it became a separate state. The rulers acceded to the Government of India on 15 June 1948, and Piploda became part of Ratlam District of Madhya Bharat state. Madhya Bharat was merged into Madhya Pradesh on 1 November 1956.

== Geography ==
Piploda is located at 23.35°N 75.43°E. It has an average elevation of 470 metres (1,541 feet).

== Demographics ==
As of 2001 India census, Piploda had a population of 7,302. Males constitute 51% of the population and females 49%. Piploda has an average literacy rate of 60%, higher than the national average of 59.5%: male literacy is 71%, and female literacy is 49%. In Piploda, 15% of the population is under 6 years of age.
