= Bhagwan Gopinath =

Indian saint

- Bhagwan Gopinath

Personal life
- Born: Gopinath Bhan; 3 July 1898^{**} Srinagar, Kashmir, India
- Died: 28 May 1968 (aged 69)(Jyeshta, Shuklapaksh, Dvitiya) Chandapora in Srinagar, Kashmir, India

Religious life
- Religion: Hinduism
- Philosophy: Trika school of Advaita Kashmir Shaivism

Religious career
- Teacher: Unknown or self-initiated (by Bhagvad Gita)
- ^** Bhagwan Gopinath’s birthday is observed on Ashad, Shuklapaksh, Dvadashi as per Hindu lunar calendar.

Quotation

Bidding adieu to ones ego leads one to self realisation.

Bhagwan Gopinath (born Gopinath Bhan; also called Bhagwan Gopinath Ji; 3 July 1898 – 28 May 1968) was a mystic saint of early 20th century Kashmir in India. He has been called a jivanmukta (liberated soul) and his spiritual state has been described as Shambhavi avastha (state of Shiva). Contemporary saints of his times have also called him an Aghoreshwar. It was sometime during 1946–1956 that he came to be called as Bhagwan by his devotees.

Though not much is known about who his spiritual master was, he is known to have remarked that one can consider Bhagvad Gita as one's spiritual master. In his teachings, he regarded the practice of "self-enquiry" (atma vichara) as highly effective in helping a seeker attain self-realization. He considered lust and ego as impediments in one's spiritual development and extolled the virtues of honesty and truthfulness. He wouldn't differentiate between religions and regarded Hindus and Muslims to be one and the same. During various periods of his life, he spent considerable time meditating at various shrines in Kashmir as he considered it spiritually beneficial and would recommend the same to spiritual seekers.

== Birth and family ==
Bhagwan Gopinath was born in a Kashmiri Hindu family of Bhans, in a locality called Bhan Mohalla, in the city of Srinagar in Kashmir, on Friday 3 July 1898, which corresponds to Ashad, Shuklapaksh, Dvadashi (Ashada 19th, Vikrami 1955) per Hindu lunar calendar. His grandfather, Pandit Lachhman Joo Bhan was a wazir wazarat (deputy commissioner) of revenue department in the Dogra regime of the then-princely state of Kashmir. His father, Pandit Narayan Joo Bhan dealt in the business of cashmere wool and devoted much of his time to spiritual pursuits. He is known to have donated all his ancestral inheritance to his step-mother. Bhagwan Gopinath's mother, Haar Maal, was the daughter of Pandit Prasad Joo Parimoo who was an initiated disciple of a local saint. His brother disciples used to call him Jada Bharata. Hindu scriptures like Yoga Vasistha were regularly taught and discussed in religious gatherings at their house. Prasad Joo had initiated his younger daughter, Zapaer Ded, into Japa Yoga and eventually in her fifties, she was recognised as a saint. On one occasion, while Pandit Prasad Joo Parimoo was meditating at the shrine of the deity of Mata Kheer Bhawani in Kashmir, he is said to have had a vision of the deity who expressed her desire to be born in his family as his daughter. Soon thereafter, Haar Maal was born who eventually got married and gave birth to Bhagwan Gopinath.

There have been some unconfirmed reports that Swami Vivekananda, who happened to be in Kashmir during 1898, had paid a visit to the Bhans' family on occasion of Bhagwan Gopinath's birth. Some maintain that he stopped just short of entering their house while waiting at a nearby tailor's shop on 3 July, where he got the American flag stitched, to be hoisted next day on 4 July, which was probably when he even wrote the poem To The Fourth of July.

He had two brothers and two sisters. While his elder brother, Pandit Govind Joo Bhan, remained celibate throughout his life; the younger one, Pandit Jia Lal Kak, got married but remained issueless and would spend much of his time at religious services. Both his sisters lost their husbands at an early age. The elder one, Smt Deva Mali, after bearing two daughters and the younger one, Smt Janaki Devi, after bearing two sons and two daughters. For the most part, towards the later part of his life, Bhagwan Gopinath was looked after by his elder sister and her two daughters: Smt Kamla Ji and Smt Chanda Ji.

== Early years ==
After having given up his ancestral home in favour of his step mother, Pandit Narayan Joo Bhan, along with young Gopinath who at that time must have been around 10 years old, started moving around, living at various rental accommodations. His mother died when he was 12 years old and his father died when he was around 30 years old. However, all along these years from 1909 till his final days in 1968, his family changed their residence eleven times with period of stay at these places varying sometimes from a year and a half to eleven years at a stretch.

He completed his education till middle grade from a local Christian missionary school called Tyndale Biscoe School, which used to be situated at Fateh Kadal locality of Srinagar back then. Here he must have learnt languages like Sanskrit, Persian, Urdu and scripts like Sharda and Devanagari. Some of his close devotees, at times, had heard him speak English too.

=== Employment ===
Since his early years, he had expressed reluctance in taking up any form of employment. However, given their financial circumstances, his family insisted upon him to take up some kind of employment. To begin with, during 1912, for a brief while he assisted his maternal uncle in the business of Kashmiri wool (called pashmina in local language). Then, for a period of three years, he took up the post of a compositor with Vishi Nath Printing Press. Thereafter, he started a grocery store at a place called Sekidafar. Sometime during 1920, he moved the store to a locality called Chaayidob in Srinagar. He ran the grocery store for ten years till about 1925 before taking to his spiritual pursuits full-time.

=== Spiritual inclination ===
In his younger years, he would recite by heart the sacred Hindu hymns like Bhavani Sahasranama, Indrakashi Strotam, Panchastavi, Vishnu Sahastranam, Shiv Mahimna Strotam, Shivastrotavali, Guru Gita and vaaks (poetic couplets) composed by some local saints. However, he had a marked interest for Bhagvad Gita and had kept a copy of the book close to where he would sit for his meditation right till his last day. He had memorised all these texts probably in his younger years. During his early years, young Gopinath would accompany his maternal uncle, Pandit Bhagwan Das Parimoo, who was a devotee of Sharika Bhagwati (the deity of the shrine of Hari Parbat), on annual or biannual trips to the holy spring at Pokhribal to desilt it from all the accumulated offerings of devotees. As a leader of a group of young men, he would often organise trips to local shrines like Kheer Bhawani, Mattan, Mahadev and Vicharnaag.

Since his days in middle grade, he would often visit some of the local saints like Swami Zanakak Tufchi of Habbakadal locality and Swami Baalak Kaw, a jatadhari sadhu, at Sekidafer locality. He would also press Swami Baalak Kaw's feet at times. Yet another saint that he is known to have paid regular visits to was Swami Jeevan Sahib. He would also visit Swami Narayan Joo Bhan of Bodhgeer locality in Kashmir. He would regularly attend gatherings of these saints discussing spiritual and philosophical topics on vedanta, Yoga Sutras of Patanjali and Kashmir Shaivism. During his employment days at the grocery store, while manning the cash counter at the store, he would often be found engrossed in meditation. Sometimes he would spend whole night at the store while being absorbed in meditation.

== Spiritual master ==
No one knows for sure as to who Bhagwan Gopinath's spiritual master (guru) was. Some of his relatives were of the opinion that he received spiritual initiation from his own father while his younger sister, Janaki Devi, was of the view that Swami Baalak Kaw was his spiritual master. However, few years before his death, a devotee enquired of him as to who his guru was. In response to this, Bhagwan Gopinath is said to have pointed towards Bhagvad Gita and remarked that any one its 700 verses can be considered as one's spiritual master. S. N. Fotedar, his principal biographer, who was associated with him for over two decades, tried to lay his hands on all the evidence he could in this regard and finally settled with the opinion that Swami Zanakak Tufchi was his spiritual master. This was later corroborated by the testimony of Pandit Baalji Wangnoo who was the younger brother of Swami Aftab Joo Wangnoo. Swami Aftab Joo Wangnoo was an initiated disciple of Swami Zanakak Tufchi. Although Mr Fotedar got convinced with this idea, he was not able to establish it conclusively as an accepted fact particularly amongst Bhagwan Gopinath's devotees at large. Based on Bhagwan Gopinath's comments about Bhagvad Gita, majority of his devotees, including some religious writers, consider him to have been self initiated.

== Spiritual practice ==
Although Bhagwan Gopinath's family tried to convince him to get married and take up the worldly life, he chose to live a life of celibacy and did his spiritual practices, all the while living at various localities of Srinagar in Kashmir. The tenure of his spiritual practice can be divided into the following three stages:

=== Initial stage (1908–1930) ===
From his younger years, Bhagwan Gopinath would devote much of his time attending religious gatherings of singers (called bhajan mandalis) singing glories of God and deities of Kheer Bhawani and Hari Parbat shrines. He would also attend religious plays (called rasa-lilas) and gatherings of religious men (called satsang) discussing spiritual topics. Based on some of his relics and hymns found written in his own handwriting, dedicated to Maha Ganesh, Hindu Mother Goddess, Lord Narayana, Lord Shiva and his spiritual master, his devotees believe that he had practised a form of spiritual practice called sanatana panchang upasana (also called panchayatana puja) in the beginning of his spiritual journey, which consist of worshipping these four deities and one's spiritual master. From the age of 22 years, he is said to have started the daily practice of circumambulating the shrine of Hari Parbat in Srinagar. He was often found meditating for long hours at the shrine courtyard while smoking his pipe (called chillum in local language). He is said to have had a vision of the deity of the shrine of Hari Parbat, Mata Sharika Bhawani, at the age of 25. Hereafter, he is believed to have gradually veered towards the practice of meditating on God without a form (called nirguna upasana in Hinduism).

=== Intermediate stage (1931–1937) ===
During this period, he is known to have resorted to extreme measures of sense control which involve self-abnegation methods like fasting for months together (having just a cup of tea a day) while taking huge quantities of food at other times. During this time, he confined himself in a dark room with a lamp that used to be lit up at all times. He would often be found lying on bed while facing the wall. He did not allow very many people in his room during this period. Whole room and his bed used to be covered with a lot of dust and one could find cobwebs and spiders around the room but he wouldn't bother cleaning it or let anyone else clean it. A rat is said to have nibbled a hole into one of his heels during this time though he is said to have been oblivious to its pain. His only constant companion in the room besides the burning lamp was his pipe. During this time he would take intoxicants like opium and sometimes vomit a lot of blood. His whole body had swollen and had become weak. On one occasion his sister reminded him of the financial difficulties they were going through but he is said to have responded by saying (translated here into English) "our boat is in the middle of ocean right now, either we would reach ashore safe or drown". Some religious writers think he might have practised some form of tantric spiritual practice like pranabhasya during this time. After seven such years of his spiritual practice, his devotees affirm that he had become, what they call in Hinduism, a siddha purusha (one who attains spiritual powers) as it was right after this period that people started flocking him to get their worldly problems solved.

=== Final stage (1938–1968) ===
During this stage, he is a said to have practised some technique of meditation that would seemingly help him control elements (called tattva) like fire and water out of the total 36 such elements enumerated in Kashmir Shaivism. He started the practice of blowing air at live charcoals in his fire pot (called kanger in local language) sometimes for hours together. He was found talking to and directing invisible people at times. Various parts of his body like his shoulders and knees were seen shuddering at times. He spiritually initiated a Sikh disciple who had come to see him from some other state and lived at his home for 3 months. He also initiated Pandit Maheshwar Nath Zutshi of Mallapore locality of Srinagar by offering him his pipe. He also started the practice of transfixing his gaze on water filled in a tumbler kept inside a brass basin filled with water. This brass basin was placed over an earthenware pot which too was filled with water. It was also during this time that majority of his miracles were recorded and people started flocking him, seeking solutions to their worldly problems. It was sometime during the period between 1946–56 that he came to be called as Bhagwan by his devotees. He regularly visited the shrines of the deities of Mata Sharika Bhagwati and Mata Ragnya Bhawani during this period. Sometime after 1957, on every Sunday afternoon, musical concerts were held at his place by known local musicians who would play local and Indian classical music for him. Some of the other shrines visited by him during the initial and final stages of his spiritual practice were Jwala Ji at Khrew, Bhadrakali at Handwara, Jyestha Bhagwati at Srinagar, Gupt Ganga near Nishat Bagh, Tushkaraja Bhairav at Srinagar and Amarnath.

== Philosophy ==
Bhagwan Gopinath, being an introvert, was a man of few words and had a straightforward demeanor. He is known to have always shunned publicity and covered himself with anonymity. As such, various religious commentators along with his devotees have found it difficult to classify his spiritual journey into a particular school of Indian philosophical thought. Its widely believed that he must have followed the tenets of trika doctrine of advaita (non-dual) Kashmir Shaivism (in which, the Goddess Bhairavi-Aghoreshwari is enthroned above God Bhairava and is the main ideal of worship) with jnana (knowledge), iccha (will) and kriya (action) having had a dominating influence on him.

Once, while explaining the inter-relation of various spiritual disciplines in realising God, he said: " think of Brahman (God without a form) as a tree and if one sits on any one of its branches (various spiritual disciplines), the same goal will be reached in each case." He once remarked: "Omkara (Hindu Symbol) is the "throat" of Godhead and nothing is possible without it". A couple of his pen-drawings have been found in which he has drawn the symbol Omkara (in Sharada script) surrounded by the names "Rama" and "Shiva" probably indicating that God (in the form of Omkara) can be realised through either path. Once, while visiting the shrine of Amarnath, he is said to have remarked: "Shiva is dancing everywhere" and afterwards, was seen in a joyful mood the whole day.

He would keep incense sticks burning in flames instead of letting them smoulder as he had an affinity for light sources. Sometimes he would also keep the oblations, offered in the fire pot, burning in flames and also referred to it as the "feet" of Lord Narayan. He would refer to his legs as mere "logs of wood" and the body as "food" for the God of death (Mahakal) and as such didn't consider physical body as the end-all be-all of human existence.

He wouldn't advise anyone to give up one's family and household in pursuit of self-realisation but guided people only if they practised celibacy.

Gathering from various hymns written by him, it is evident that he had an inclination towards Bhakti tradition as well, which is also indicated by his fondness for Indian classical music and the pictures of Guru Nanak and Ramakrishna that adorned his walls.

== Stature ==
In his own words, when enquired about his spiritual state by a saint from Banaras who had come to visit him in May 1957, he is known to have recited the 6th verse from chapter-15 of Bhagavad Gita, which reads as follows:

na tad bhaasayate suryo

na shashaanko na paavakah
yad gatva na nivartante

tad dhaama paramam mama

and translates as "neither the sun illumines it, nor the moon, nor the fire. That is my prime abode (spiritual state), where having reached, one does not return". His devotees and other contemporary saints of his times have described his spiritual state as jivanmukta. Some religious scholars have described his spiritual state as Shambhavi avastha (the state of being Shiva) while others have described it as Bhramastithi (the state of ever dwelling in Brahman). Some of his devotees believe him to be one of the Saptarishis (seven sages in Hinduism). He is known to have sent one of his devotees, Mr. Zadoo, to convey greetings to the Saptarishi cluster of rocks on the hillside of Hari Parbat. Other scholars have compared his spiritual stature to Ramana Maharshi, Ramakrishna Paramahansa and Aurbindo Ghosh. Many visiting monks would describe him as a rare siddha and an avadhuta.

== Disciplic succession ==
Bhagwan Gopinath is not known to have made any formal disciples although he is said to have spiritually initiated a few seekers that would come to him seeking his spiritual tutelage. His method of initiation involved sharing his pipe or by transfixing his gaze on them (called drishtipat). He would rarely initiate anyone by word of mouth although that is believed to be the commonly invoked method of initiation in Hinduism. He is known to have guided seekers based on their spiritual aptitude and receptivity in worshipping either saguna Brahman (God with form) or nirguna Brahman (God without form) and sometimes also help them choose their ideal of worship or veer them towards worshipping guru as Parabrahma (the ultimate reality). Though he would recommend saguna upasana for the beginners, he would eventually veer them towards nirguna upasana. Once in response to a question by his devotee as to whether saints should render help to people in spiritual and temporal spheres, he is known to have remarked that unlike a muscular animal who can easily swim across the river, a small insect would drown without help so they have to be helped. As such, his devotees gave him the epithet Jagadguru (spiritual guide of humanity).

== Reception ==
In December 1973, Satya Sai Baba, while receiving one of Bhagwan Gopinath's devotees at Puttaparthi, is said to have remarked that Bhagwan Gopinath was the greatest Kashmiri saint and a jivanmukta in real sense, although there is no recorded evidence to prove Satya Sai Baba ever having met Bhagwan Gopinath during his lifetime. Swami Kash Kak, a contemporary saint of Kashmir during his times, is said to have remarked that Bhagwan Gopinath was the recipient of special grace of Mata Sharika Bhagwati, the deity of Hari Parbat shrine in Kashmir and Swami Nand Bab, yet another contemporary saint of his times, is said to have described him as the shahanshah of saints of Kashmir. Bhagwan Ramji, a practitioner of Aghor Yoga from Kreem Kund in Varanasi, described his spiritual state as that of an Aghoreshwar.

== Reported miracles ==
From around 1938, his devotees started recording and attributing various miracles to him like treating incurable diseases, blessing issueless couple with children, bringing back dead to life as the situation demanded, bilocation, mindreading, materialisation, helping people to see the deity of local shrines like Kheer Bhawani and Hari Parbat in human form and also in the form of their effulgence and many more, which have been meticulously documented primarily by his principal biographer and also by other devotees. His devotees have also reported miracles after his death. On 3 July 1999, an officer of the 18th Battalion of The Grenadiers regiment of Indian Army reportedly sighted him at the battle front during Kargil war, directing assault operation to recapture Tiger Hills. A similar sighting was reported by an officer of Indian Army during the 1947 war.

== Final days ==
A couple years before dying he was often heard remarking that he had grown old and this to some of his devotees was him dropping hints about his final days being imminently close. On the morning of 28 May 1968, as a part of his daily routine, he washed his face, tied his turban and smeared his forehead with a saffron mark (called tilak in Hinduism). All throughout the day, many people had come to visit him. Later-on in the noon, some sadhus (wandering monks) too had come to visit him. He used to give alms to these visiting sadhus (some of whom he would call as mere jugglers in ochre robes) who, on their journey to Amarnath shrine, would stop-over at his place. On this day too, he gave these sadhus whatever money he had in his cloth purse. He is then said to have gone into a state of meditative trance (called samadhi in Hinduism) till about 5:30 pm when he asked for some water and was helped to drink a tumbler full of sweet water. He died at about 5:45 pm and his recorded last words were Om Namah Shivaya (the mantra of Lord Shiva). On his death, Swami Nand Lal, is said to have remarked that Kashmir was being rocked by an earthquake. He is also said to have predicted Bhagwan Gopinath's death a week in advance.

== Teachings ==
Bhagwan Gopinath never taught in a formal way. However, he would, from time to time, make statement either in response to questions of devotees, or on his own while being amongst them. Being a man of few words, he would usually use short sentences and one had to lend a curious ear to decipher their contextual meaning. A few of such of his statements, translated here into English, which his devotees recognise as his teachings, are as follows:

- One should cultivate and preserve the three virtues of righteous moral conduct, viz straightforwardness, honesty and purity in thought, word and deed.
- Self realisation comes when one bids farewell to ones ego.
- Lust is the biggest impediment in ones spiritual development.
- Keen intellectual contemplation and self scrutiny help one to realise all aspects of God.
- Serious spiritual seekers should not be afraid of taking on the road which is fraught with difficulties of self-realisation.
- One should rise above the narrow division of religion, caste or creed and make peace with all humanity.
- One can consider Bhagvad Gita as ones spiritual master.
- Sincere spiritual efforts and guru's grace lead a seeker to self-realisation.
- A seeker must surrender onto guru's feet with all his heart and soul.
- One should always contribute to charity to not let greed settle in.

== In culture ==
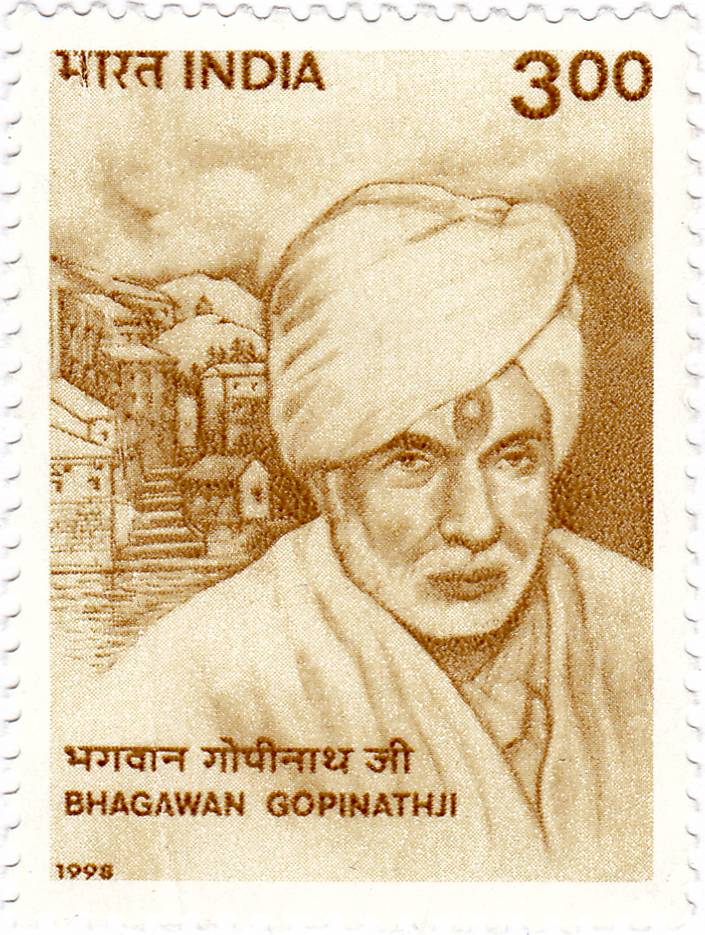
Bhagwan Gopinath on a 1998 stamp of India

- Indian Postal Service, released a stamp titled Bhagwan Gopinathji on the occasion of his 100th birth anniversary on 3 July 1998 "Stamp titled Bhagwan Gopinathji released". Archived from the original on 21 July 2011.

"Stamp information".

- Doordarshan has made a documentary on Bhagwan Gopinath in the year 1996.

== Press releases ==
- Bhagwan Gopinath Heritage Hall inaugurated in Jammu on 21 November 2010 "Heritage Hall to be inaugurated in Bhagavaan Gopinath Ashram". Daily Excelsior (Press release). 21 November 2010.

- Chief Minister of Delhi releases biography of Bhagwan Gopinath in Hindi on 26 December 2007 "CM releases biography of Bhagwan Gopinath". One India News (Press release). 26 December 2007. Archived from the original on 9 October 2012.

== Notes ==
- Sh. S.N.Fotedar could very well be called the principal biographer of Bhagwan Gopinath. His work has been labelled as "detailed" and having enough factual material in it by Sh S.N.Katju, who used to serve as a judge at Allahabad High Court and whose son, Markandey Katju, formerly a judge of Supreme Court of India, completed his tenure as the chairman of Press Council of India on 5 October 2014. One could be tempted to jump the gun in labelling him as a primary resource, but having spent over two decaded with Bhagwan Gopinath, and given Mr Katju's appraisal of his work and with no reason to doubt the judgments of Mr. Katju, some of the references in the present article have been taken from his work.
