= Aalot =

Aalot Aalot Allote
- Town
- Location in Madhya Pradesh, India Aalot (India)
- Coordinates: 23.7621400°N 75.5599100°E
- Country: India
- State: Madhya Pradesh
- District: Ratlam
- Elevation: 439 m (1,440 ft)

Population (2011)
  - Total: 24,115

Languages
  - Official: Hindi
- Time zone: UTC+5:30 (IST)
- ISO 3166 code: IN-MP
- Vehicle registration: MP

Aalot is a town and nagar panchayat in the Ratlam district of Madhya Pradesh, India. The name is derived from King Alia Bhil who established the region.

== Demographics ==
Aalot had a population of 24,115 as of the 2011 census.

== See also ==
- Kharwa Kala, a village under Aalot taluka
