= Jaora State =

Princely state of India

Coordinates: 23.63°N 75.13°E

Jaora State जावरा रियासत
- Princely State of British India
- 1818–1948
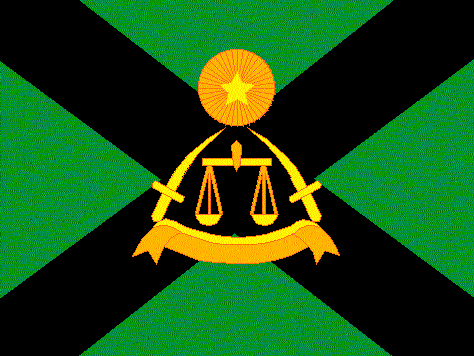
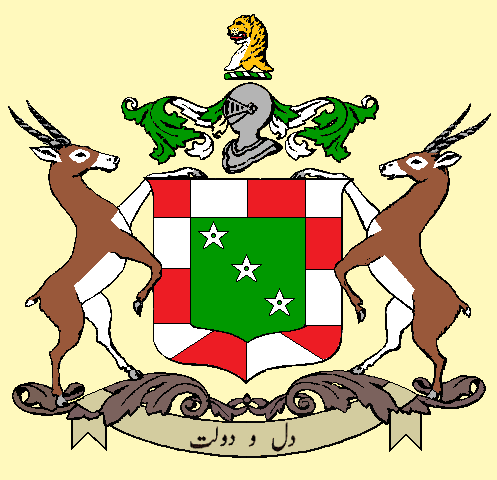
- Flag Coat of arms

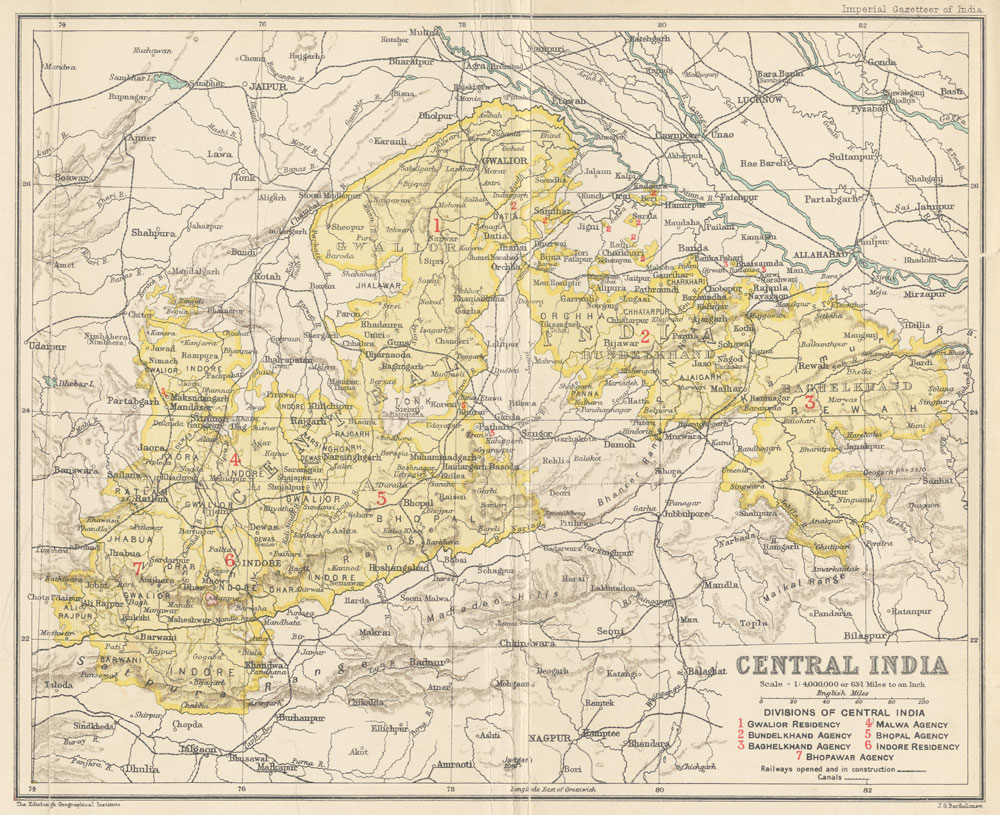
- Jaora located within the Malwa Agency near 4
- Area
  - 1901: 1,471 km^{2} (568 sq mi)
- Population
  - 1901: 84,202
- Government
  - Motto: "Dil o daulat" (Heart and wealth).
- History
  - Established: 1818
  - Independence of India: 1948
Succeeded by
India
- Today part of: Madhya Pradesh, India

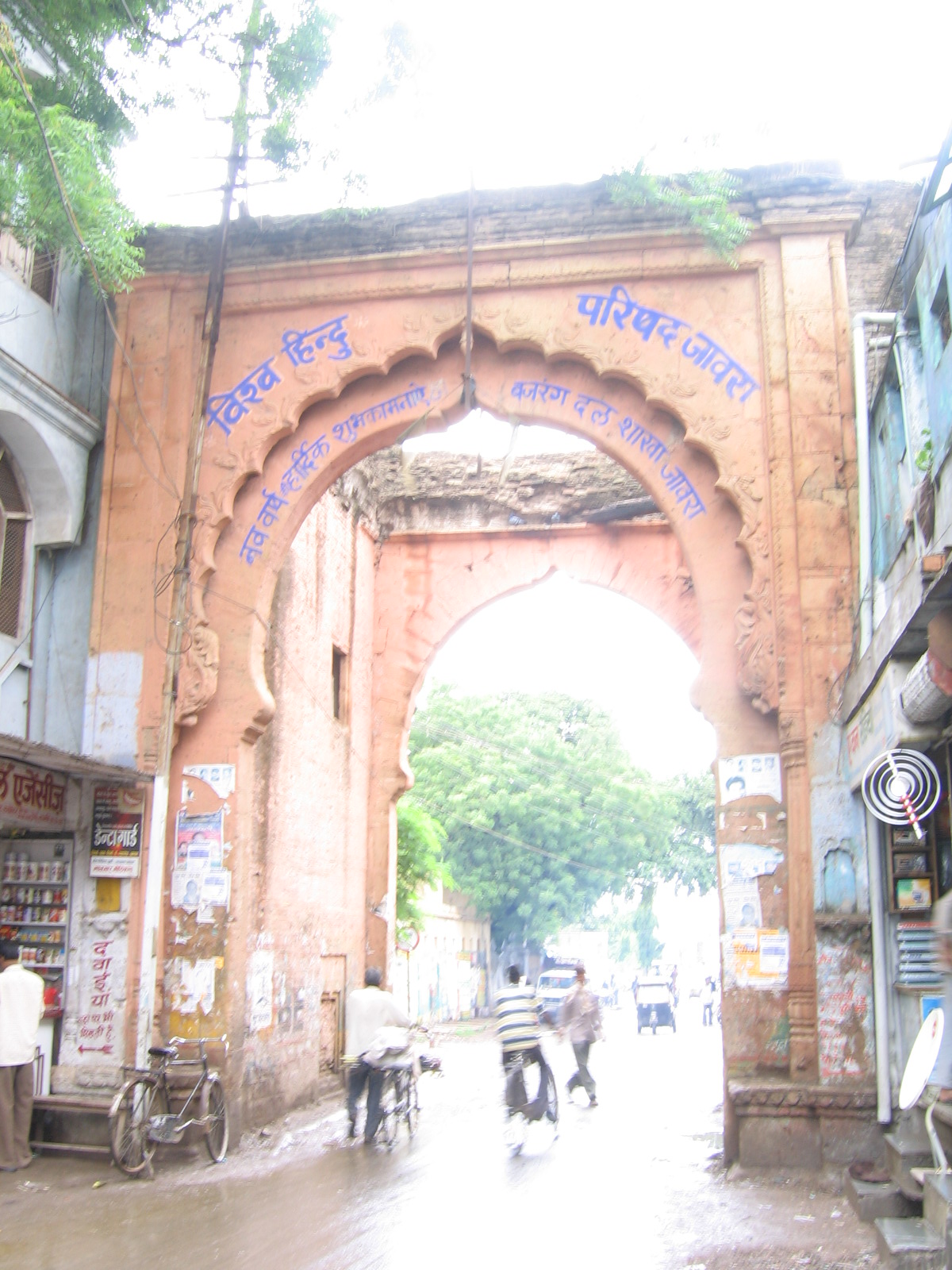
Ratlami Gate, Jaora

The Jaora state flag was a green triangle between 1865 and 1895.

Jaora State was a 13 gun-salute princely state of the British Raj. It was part of the Malwa Agency.

The total area of the princely state, with the dependencies of Piploda and Panth-Piploda, was 1,471 km^{2} (568 sq mi). Jaora state was divided into four tehsils, Jaora, Barauda, Tal, and Barkhera. The chief crops were millets, cotton, maize and opium. The revenue of the state was Rs.8,50,000 in 1901.

== History ==
Jaora State was established by the British and was handed over to Abdul Ghafur Muhammad Khan in 1818, so that he can maintain an army of 1,000 soldiers for the East India Company. Abdul Ghafur Khan's family was settled in Uttar Pradesh/Hindustan before migrating to Rajasthan, while they traced their ancestry to the Salarzai Sub-tribe of Musazai - Ilyaszai Clan of Yusufzai tribe of District Buner, Khyber Pakhtunkhwa 'Abdu'l Ghafur Muhammad Khan was a cavalry officer serving the North Indian Pathan leader Amir Khan Pindari of Sambhal, Uttar Pradesh. He later served the Holkar maharaja of Indore State and defected to the British in the Battle of Mahidpur resulting in the victory of the British and the surrender of Holkar forces. The state was confirmed by the British government in 1818 by the Treaty of Mandsaur. The Nawab of Jaora was confirmed the possession of Jaora, Sanjit, Tal, Malhargarh, Bharauda and the right to levy tribute from Piploda. The Nawab was expected to serve the British by providing them with 500 horsemen, 500 footmen and 4 artillery whenever required. Most of the soldiers and population of the Jaora State came from United Provinces of Agra and Oudh region of Hindustan. One of his fellow soldiers, Mir Zafar Ali, was an Indian Muslim of the Sadaat-e-Bara tribe, born in the Bahera village of the Fatehpur Haswa in Oudh. He gained Bilaud in the Sanjit Pargana as his jagir.

Muhammad Ismail Khan was not a good administrator and the state fell in heavy debts with a sum of 16 lakhs due. The state also had to pay nazarana fee of 2 lakhs to Holkar when a new ruler was installed and a yearly tribute of 1.6 lakhs to the British when Jaora failed to provide troops. This tribute was later reduced to 1.4 lakhs and was preferred by the state. The army was then reduced to 59 cavalry, 124 infantry and 36 irregulars. There was also a regular police force present in the state.

Nawab Muhammad Ismail (ruled 1865-1895) was an honorary major in the British Army. During the reign of Nawab Muhammad Iftekhar Ali Khan (ruled 1895-1947), Piploda became a separate state in 1924, and Panth-Piploda became a province of British India in 1942. Nawab Muhammad Usman 'Ali Khan (ruled 1947-1948) acceded to the Government of India on 15 June 1948.

== Jagirdars of Jaora ==
The chieftains of several petty estates who once paid tribute to Amir Khan Pindari and the other surrounding powers came under the suzerainty of Jaora State after the Treaty of Mandsaur. The Jagirdars were mostly Rajputs apart from Bilaud and Numan Nagdi who were Pathans and Barha Sayyids and Sidri whose thakur was a Mahajan.

== See also ==
- Central India Agency
- Political integration of India
- Pathans of Madhya Pradesh
