= Kailash Nath Katju =

3rd Chief Minister of Madhya Pradesh

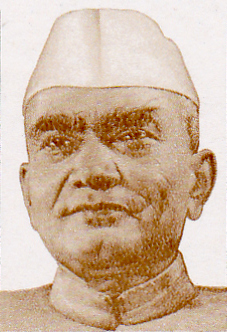

3rd Chief Minister of Madhya Pradesh
- In office 31 January 1957 – 11 March 1962
- Preceded by: Bhagwantrao Mandloi
- Succeeded by: Bhagwantrao Mandloi

4th Minister of Defence
- In office 10 January 1955 – 30 January 1957
- Prime Minister: Jawaharlal Nehru
- Preceded by: Baldev Singh
- Succeeded by: V. K. Krishna Menon

4th Minister of Home Affairs
- In office 5 November 1951 – 10 January 1955
- Prime Minister: Jawaharlal Nehru
- Preceded by: C. Rajagopalachari
- Succeeded by: Govind Ballabh Pant

2nd Governor of West Bengal
- In office 21 June 1948 – 1 November 1951
- Chief Minister: Bidhan Chandra Roy
- Preceded by: C. Rajagopalachari
- Succeeded by: Harendra Coomar Mookerjee

1st Governor of Orissa
- In office 15 August 1947 – 20 June 1948
- Chief Minister: Harekrushna Mahatab
- Preceded by: Chandulal Madhavlal Trivedi
- Succeeded by: Asaf Ali

Personal details
- Born: 17 June 1887 Jaora, Jaora State, British India (present-day Madhya Pradesh, India)
- Died: 17 February 1968 (aged 80) Allahabad, Uttar Pradesh, India
- Party: Indian National Congress
- Spouse: Rup Kishori
- Children: 5; including Shiva Nath Katju, Brahma Nath Katju
- Education: Allahabad University
- Occupation: Lawyer; Politician

Kailash Nath Katju (17 June 1887 – 17 February 1968) was an Indian politician who served as Governor of Orissa and West Bengal, Chief Minister of Madhya Pradesh, Union Home Minister and Union Defence Minister. He was also one of India's most prominent lawyers. He was part of some of the most notable cases of his times, including the Indian National Army trials. Katju joined the Indian independence movement early on and spent several years incarcerated with fellow independence activists for his activities.

== Early life ==
Kailash Nath Katju was born in the princely state of Jaora (in present-day Madhya Pradesh) on 17 June 1887. His family were Kashmiri Pandits who had settled in Jaora. His father Tribhuwan Nath Katju was a former dewan of the state. Kailash Nath was educated at the Barr High School in Jaora, when he was sent to Lahore to study at the Rang Mahal School. He passed his matriculation examination from Panjab University the following year before completing his graduation from Forman Christian College, Lahore, in March 1905. In July that year, he joined the Muir Central College in Allahabad. In September 1907, he received a degree in laws from the Allahabad University, standing second in the province. In 1908, he received a master's degree in history from the same university. He began legal profession that year in Kanpur before moving to Allahabad in 1914. He completed his doctorate in law (LL.D.) from Allahabad University in 1919, joining the Allahabad High Court as an advocate in 1921.

== Career ==
Katju defended the accused in the Meerut Conspiracy Case in Allahabad High Court in 1933 and later the military officers accused at the Indian National Army trials at the Red Fort in Delhi. On 17 July 1937, he became the Minister of Law and Justice and Parliamentary Affairs of the United Provinces in the Govind Ballabh Pant's cabinet. He was elected to the legislature from the constituency of Allahabad district (Doaba). The ministry resigned on 2 November 1939 and soon Katju was imprisoned for 18 months. He was again imprisoned in 1942. He also served in the Constituent Assembly of India. Between 1935 and 1937, he served as the chairman of the Allahabad Municipal Board, and later as chancellor of Prayag Mahila Vidyapith, Allahabad.

Following the independence of India, Katju held many high political positions. Initially he was made the Governor of Orissa from 15 August 1947 to 20 June 1948. He became the Governor of West Bengal on 21 June 1948 and was in office till 31 October 1951. In 1951 he was elected to the Lok Sabha from the Mandsaur constituency, joining the cabinet of Jawaharlal Nehru as Law Minister in 1951. In November 1951 he succeeded C. Rajagopalachari as the country's third Home Minister. In 1955 he was made the Defence Minister. He became the Chief Minister of Madhya Pradesh on 31 January 1957, remaining in office till 11 March 1962. He also held the portfolios for general administration, home, publicity, planning and development, co-ordination and anti-corruption.

== Personal life ==
Katju and his wife Rup Kishori had five children together: three sons and two daughters. The eldest son, Shiva Nath Katju, served as a judge at the Allahabad High Court, and after retirement, took up politics and was elected a member of the Uttar Pradesh legislature. Another son, Brahma Nath Katju, rose to serve as chief justice of the same Allahabad High Court.

One of his daughters was Saroj Mukherjee. Katju's grandsons have also achieved distinction. His grandson Markandey (son of Shiv Nath) served as a judge in the Supreme Court of India. Another grandson is Vivek Katju, IFS, a retired diplomat who served in several sensitive positions. Tilottama Mukherji, a professor at New York University and first wife of politician and former diplomat Shashi Tharoor, is Katju's grand-daughter (daughter's daughter).

Katju had recovered from a kidney ailment he had suffered in the summer of 1967. After his condition deteriorated in early February 1968, he died at 7:55 p.m. (IST) on 17 February 1968 at his residence in Allahabad. The last rites were performed by son Shiva Nath on the bank of the Ganges the following day.

== Publications ==
Dr Kailash Nath Katju wrote many books, some of which are the following::

- Experiments in Advocacy: A Colossus in the Courts of Justice
- The days I remember
- Reminiscences and experiments in advocacy

He also wrote many articles and delivered many memorable speeches, including the following:

- Some Judges and Lawyers whom I knew
- Speech delivered on 27 November 1966, on the occasion of the Golden Jubilee of the High Court Building.

== Founder of National Herald ==
He was one of the founders of Associated Journals Ltd. and one of the seven original subscribers of the Memorandum of Association of the company which published National Herald and two other newspapers.
