= Tal, Madhya Pradesh =

Tal
- Town
- Location in Madhya Pradesh, India Tal (India)
- Coordinates: 23.72°N 75.38°E
- Country: India
- State: Madhya Pradesh
- District: Ratlam
- Elevation: 437 m (1,434 ft)

Population (2001)
  - Total: 13,073

Languages
  - Official: Hindi
- Time zone: UTC+5:30 (IST)
- Postal code: 457118
- ISO 3166 code: IN-MP
- Vehicle registration: MP-43

Tal is a town and a nagar parishad in Ratlam District of the Indian state of Madhya Pradesh. Raja Tariya Bhil established Tal in 1243 AD. Bhil rulers ruled here till sixteen centuries.

It is a tehsil of Ratlam district and situated near Chambal river. Before Indian independence, Tal was part of the princely state of Jaora.

== Etymology ==
The name of the town is derived from the King Tariya Bhil and another reason from Malvi word Talav that means pond. The town is popularly believed to be built by reclaiming land from a large pond.

== Geography ==
Tal is located at 23.72°N 75.38°E. It has an average elevation of 437 metres (1,433 feet).

== Demographics ==
As of 2001 India census, Tal had a population of 14,913. Males constitute 51% of the population and females 49%. Tal has an average literacy rate of 58%, lower than the national average of 59.5%: male literacy is 67%, and female literacy is 48%. In Tal, 17% of the population is under 6 years of age.

== History ==
Tal was part of the princely state of Jaora, ruled by the Dodiya chief. The princely state was ruled by the Dodia clan which holds the title "Rawat". Before independence the rule was under Rawat Shri Shambhu Singh ji(Tal).
