= Rao Gopal Singh Kharwa =

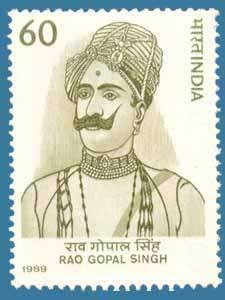
- Born: 1872; Rajasthan, India
- Died: 1939 (aged 66–67); Todgarh Fort, near Beawar, Rajasthan, India
- Occupation: Ruler of Kharwa state
- Organization: Akhil Bharatiya Kshatriya Mahasabha
- Known for: Revolt against the British Raj

Gopal Singh Rathore (1872–1939), born in what is now Rajasthan, was the ruler of the Kharwa state (near Ajmer) of Rajputana. He was sentenced to four years of imprisonment in the Todgarh Fort located approximately 70 kilometres (43 mi) from Beawar for organising a revolt against the British.

He was president of Akhil Bharatiya Kshatriya Mahasabha for the year 1924.

In 1989, India's postal department issued a postage stamp depicting his picture in his honour.

Every spring on the anniversary of his death, the residents of Kharwa and nearby villages gather at a mela (celebration or fair) to commemorate their former Thakur. He was a Rathore Rajput by birth and believed in upholding the duties of a Rajput ruler towards his people at all costs.

== See also ==
- Thakur Ganpat Singh
