= Zunain Halim Jaffer Khan =

Ustad Zunain Halim Jaffer Khan
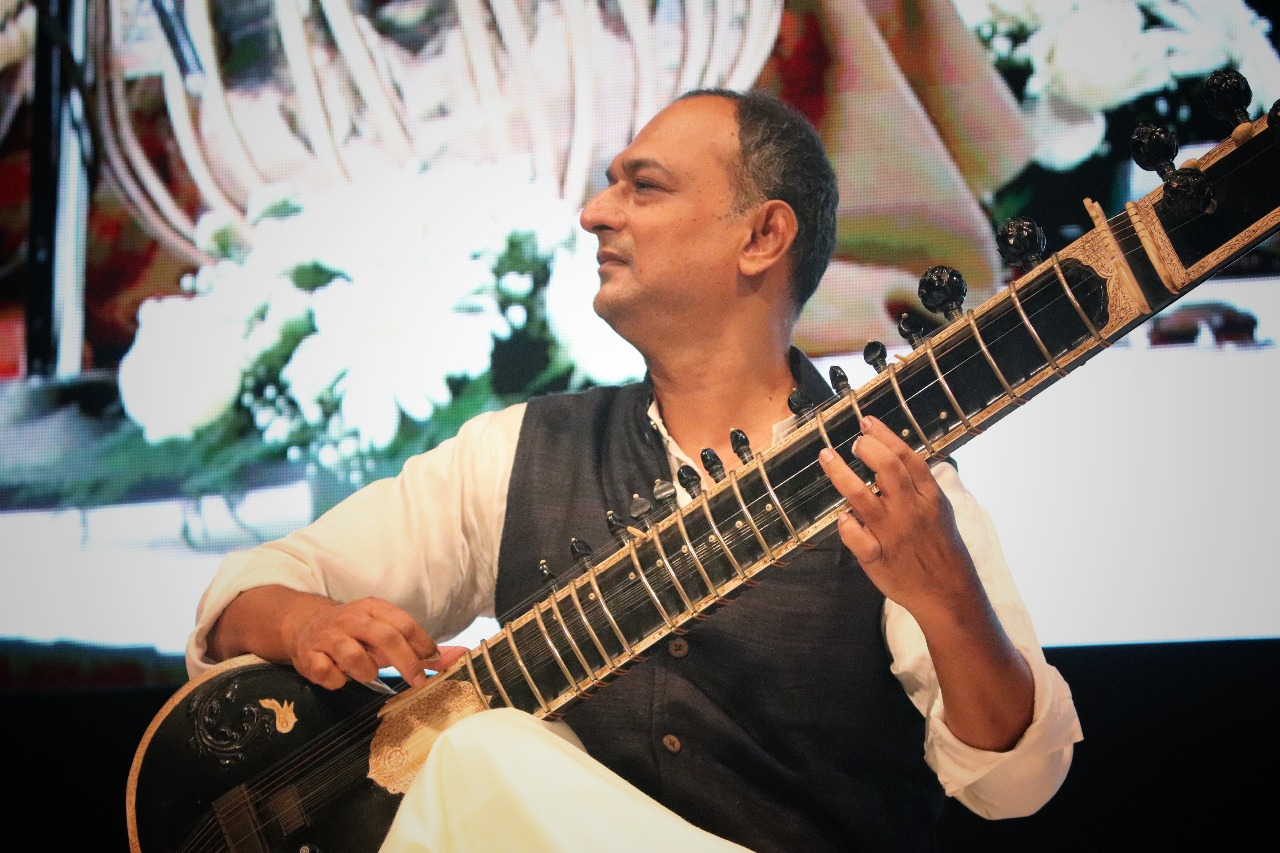
- Zunain Khan performing at the 2025 Khiraj Music Festival in Mumbai, India

Background information
- Born: January 1, 1971 (age 55); Bhopal, Madhya Pradesh, India
- Genres: Hindustani Classical Music
- Occupations: Sitarist, composer, educator, artistic director
- Instrument: Sitar
- Years active: 1990s-present
- Website: https://www.jafferkhanibaaj.com/zunainkhan

Ustad Zunain Halim Jaffer Khan (born 1 January 1971), also referred to as Zunain Halim Khan and Zunain Khan is an Indian classical sitar player. He represents the fifth generation of the Indore Beenkar Gharana and is the torch bearer of the Jafferkhani Baaj, a style of sitar playing innovated by his late father and guru, the eminent sitarist and musician, Padma Bhushan Ustad Abdul Halim Jaffer Khan.

Zunain Khan is recognized as an ‘Established’ empaneled artist by the Indian Council for Cultural Relations and ‘A’ grade artist with All India Radio (AIR). He resides in Mumbai, India.

== Early life ==
Born in Bhopal, Madhya Pradesh, Zunain Khan grew up in Mumbai. He began playing sitar at the age of five under the tutelage of his father, Ustad Abdul Halim Jaffer Khan, who transformed sitar playing style and technique, as well as capabilities of the instrument, through his innovation of the Jafferkhani Baaj.

=== Jafferkhani Baaj sitar style ===
Jafferkhani Baaj has been described as "a rare and highly sophisticated tradition of sitar playing rooted in rhythmic innovation and tonal depth". Zunain Khan explains the technique as involving “the simultaneous use of two or sometimes three strings. The left hand is called upon to do much more work resulting in a better synchronization between two hands.” The nuances of the style are demonstrated by Zunain Khan and his father in video footage accompanying the book, "Jafferkhani Baaj: Innovation in Sitar Music". An article in one of the leading English newspapers of India, The Hindu, notes that the style “evokes the image and feel of an intricately woven tapestry brimming with colors and textures.”

== Career ==
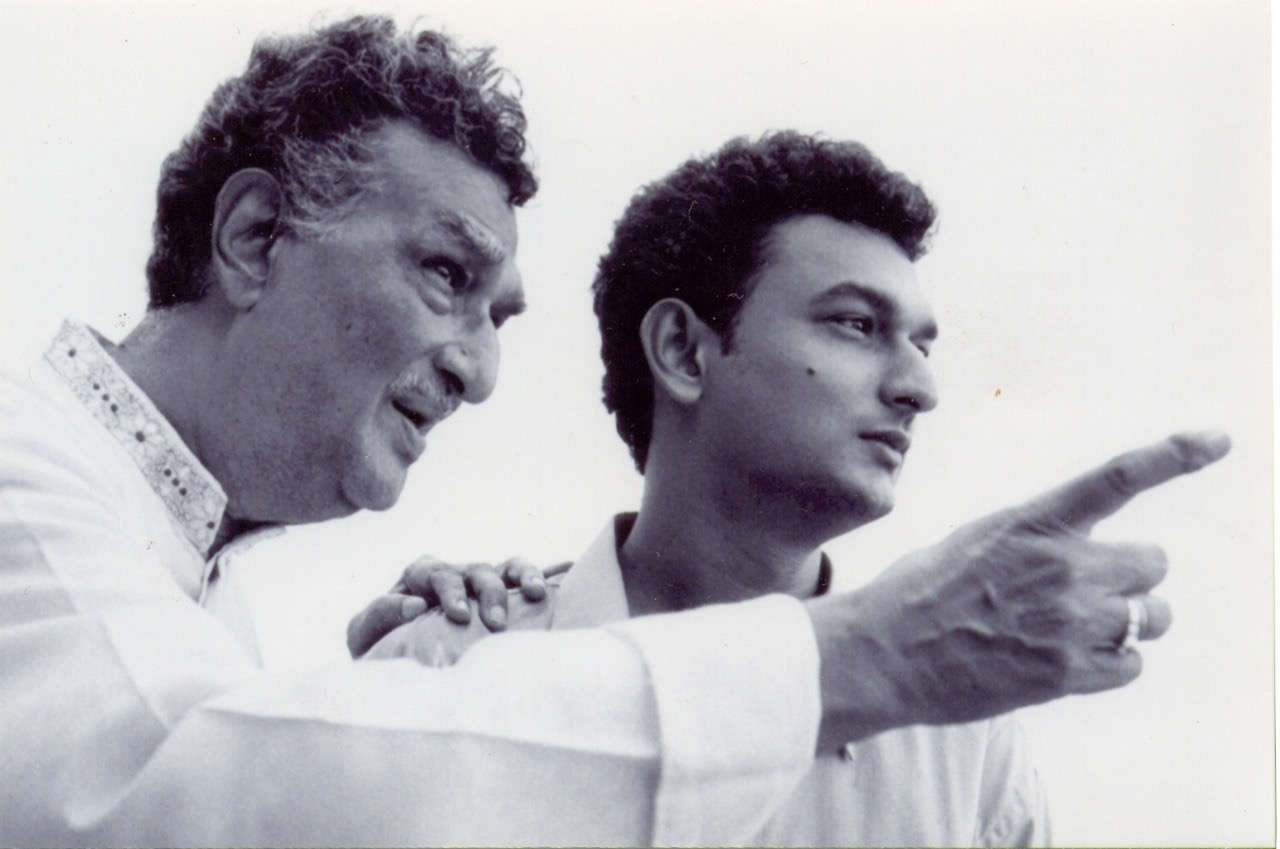
Zunain and Abdul Halim Jaffer Khan circa 2000

=== Performances ===
The Deccan Herald describes Zunain Khan’s recitals as having “a filled-in reverberation” reminiscent of the ‘been’ instrument on which his gharana is based. The Pioneer describes his performances enthralling and “delivering the legacy of the Jafferkhani Baaj and conveying the essence and the very beauty of his instrument.” The Delhi Junction points to his "ability to be uncompromising in the traditional training he has received while also being able to reach the modern audience" with an "arresting performance style".

Zunain Khan has performed at prestigious festivals and venues in India including Tansen Samaroh, Gwalior, Marwar Festival (formerly known as the Mand festival) under the aegis of the Sangeet Natak Akademi, SaMaPa Sangeet Sammelan, Sur Manjari of the Horizon series of the Indian Council for Cultural Relations, Pandit Nand Kishore Sharma Smriti Samaroh, National Dhrupad Samaroh at the India Habitat Centre, New Delhi and World Music Day celebrations at the Jagannath Centre of Art and Culture, Mysore.

International performances include Festival D’ETE Nantes, France, Strings of Unity: International Rondalla/Plucked String Festival (Cuerdas), Philippines, Joenju International Sori Festival, South Korea, and with Basant Bahar at the India Community Center in California, USA. Zunain was the official cultural delegate at India’s Republic Day celebrations in Beijing, China.

Zunain Khan has collaborated with a number of Hindustani and Carnatic classical musicians as well as musicians from global heritage traditions. Highlights include santoor-sitar duets with the late Padma Shri Pandit Bhajan Sopori and his son, Pandit Abhay Rustom Sopori. Zunain was an ensemble member of the 1998 Flamenco-Natyam India Tour of PANI, a project conceived and produced by Bharatanatyam dancer Rajika Puri and Guggenheim Fellow and Flamenco danseuse La Conja. The project included Flamenco guitarist Pedro Cortes and Mridangam player S. Shankaranarayan. PANI premiered at the National Center for the Performing Arts (NCPA), Mumbai, and also performed at the India Habitat Centre, New Delhi. In February 2026, Zunain Khan led an ensemble of noted Indian classical musicians, Amit Kavthekar (tabla), Ravi Shankar Mishra (flute) and Rajan Mashelkar (violin) in performance at the Taj Mahal Palace hotel in Mumbai honoring His Excellency Emmanuel Macron and Honorable Prime Minister of India Narendra Modi during the French President’s official visit to India to strengthen India-France relations.

==== Teaching ====
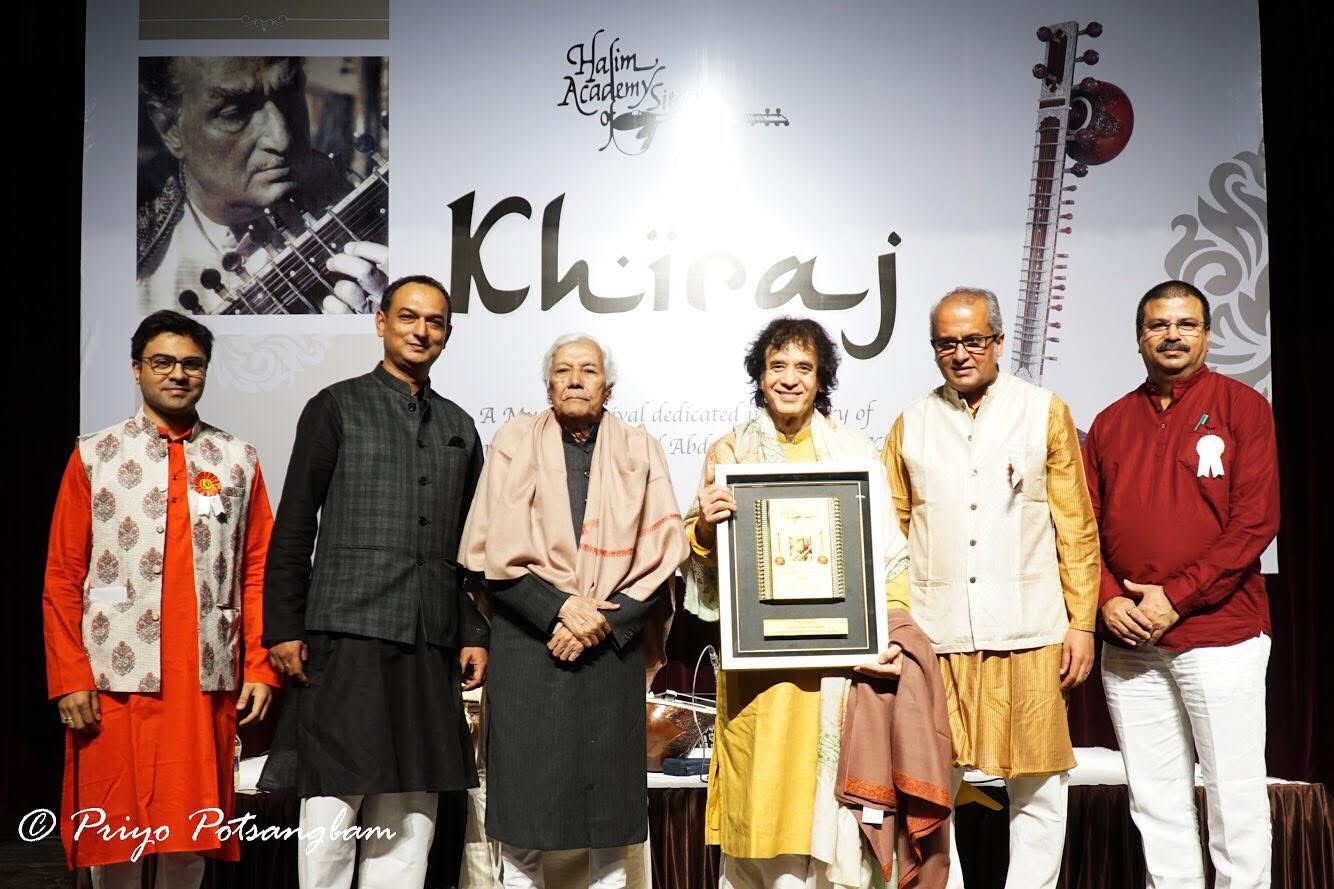
Ustad Zakir Hussain (3rd from the right) after receiving the Jafferkhani Samman with Zunain Khan (2nd from the left)

Zunain Khan is the Executive Director of Halim Academy of Sitar, the first sitar academy in India founded in 1976 by his father. He teaches sitar in the Jafferkhani style to students across India and abroad, and organizes music events to commemorate Guru Purnima and showcase performances of his students. Zunain served at the University of Wisconsin-Madison as a Resident Teaching Artist where he also performed for the Indian Consul-General, Mukta Dutta Tomar. He has presented lecture-demonstrations on the sitar and Jafferkhani Baaj at the University of California, Los Angeles and CalArts.

==== Artistic Director ====
In 2017, Zunain Khan launched Khiraj, an annual Indian classical music festival in the memory of his late father, Ustad Abdul Halim Jaffer Khan. The festival hosts performances by renowned Indian classical musicians and confers the Jafferkhani Samman (honor) to one eminent musician each year. The first awardee was the iconic tabla artist and composer, the Late Ustad Zakir Hussain and in 2020, legendary violinist Dr. N Rajam received the award.

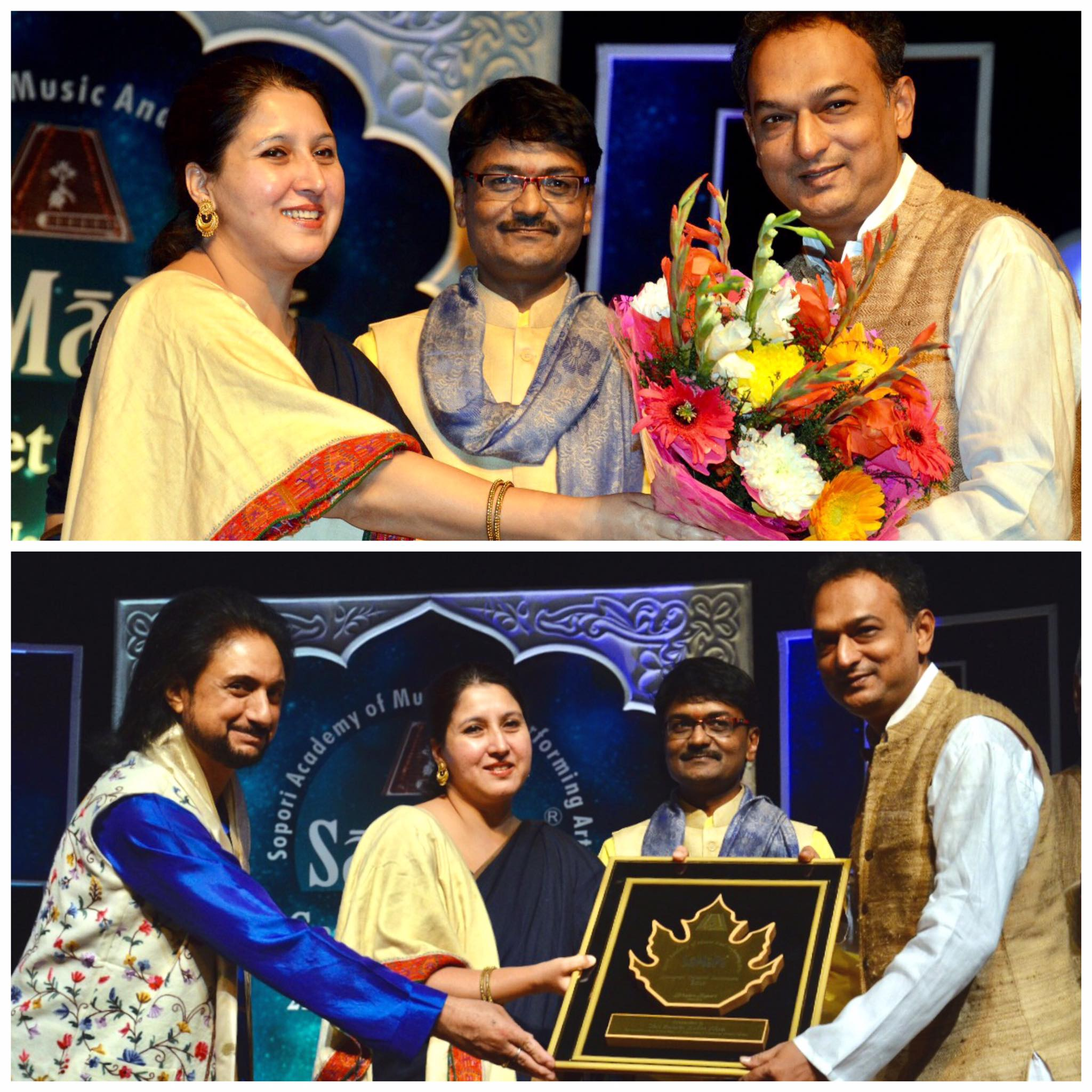
Zunain Khan receiving the Sangeet Tejasvi Samman from Late Pandit Bhajan Sopori and Ms. Nirupama Kotru, Joint Secretary, Ministry of Culture, Government of India,

== Awards and Recognition ==
- SaMaPa Sangeet Tejasvi Samman, Sopori Academy of Music and Performing Arts, 2018
- Gaanwardhan Award 2022 in collaboration with the National Centre for the Performing Arts (NCPA), Mumbai
- 'Established' empaneled artist, Indian Council for Cultural Relations
- 'A' grade artist, All India Radio
- Fellowship on researching different sitar styles, Ministry of Education (formerly Ministry of Human Resource Development)

== Recordings ==
- Raga Gurjari Todi and Raga Sindh Bhairavi, Indian Council of Cultural Relations archive (Starts at 11 minutes into the video)
- Raga Bairagi, Indian Council of Cultural Relations archive
- Zunain Halim Khan (Sitar). CD. Produced by Meera Music. Tracks: 1. Raga Kalpana (29.48) 2. Raga Madhyami (14.7) 3. Sufiyana Rang (12.21)
- Zunain Halim Khan. Sitar recital broadcast on the National Programme of Music on All India Radio on 15 August 2026. Raga Rageshree, Raga Kirwani and Des Dhun. Accompanied by Aneesh Pradhan on tabla. Available from the Akashvani AIR YouTube channel.
