= Kharwa Kala =

Kharwa Kala Kharwa Kalan, Kharwa
- Village
- Location in Madhya Pradesh, India
- Coordinates: 23°31′11″N 75°28′28″E
- Country: India
- State: Madhya Pradesh
- District: Ratlam
- Taluka: Alot

Government
  - Body: Gram Panchayat

Languages
  - Official: Hindi
- Time zone: UTC+5:30 (IST)
- Nearest city: Ujjain
- Lok Sabha constituency: Ratlam
- Vidhan Sabha constituency: Alot
- Civic agency: Gram Panchayat

Kharwa Kala is a village in Ratlam District of Madhya Pradesh, India. It is about 85 kilometers from Ujjain and about 80 kilometers from Ratlam. It is located on the road connecting Ujjain to Neemach.

== History ==
Kharwa was a vibrant place during the early 20th century. It was a seat for missionary activities in Malwa. It has a few British-era buildings, including one mission school, a hostel building, and a two huge bungalows. One impressive structure in the village is the "Harcourt Memorial Church", which was built in the early part of the 20th century. In recent years a youth group has revived the mission school, and the hostel now accommodates over 100 children from poor communities, primarily from the Bhanchada caste. As a result, Kharwa has once again become a vibrant community.

The main profession of this village is agriculture. The area also grows opium.

== Transport ==
Only one state road connects it to the nearby cities and towns with bus service. There are multiple connections through private bus operators to the nearby towns of Ujjain, Ratlam, Nagda, Indore, etc.

== Local Administration ==
Kharwa is governed by a gram panchayat. The village has one police outpost with regular staff.

Kharwa has one government hospital with few doctors and one private nursing home that caters to the local population. There is a branch of Nationalized Allahabad Bank to take care of local needs and to extend lines of credit to villagers.
