= Brahma Nath Katju =

Indian judge (1927–2004)

Brahma Nath Katju (24 May 1927 – 2004) was an Indian judge and the Chief Justice of the Allahabad High Court.

== Life and career ==
Katju was the son of Indian politician Kailash Nath Katju. He studied in Boys' High School in Allahabad and Doon School at Dehradun. He passed LL.B. from Allahabad University. After the enrollment as an Advocate in 1951 he started practice in Allahabad High Court. Katju served as Assistant Government Advocate from 1959 to 1974. He mainly practised in Civil, Constitutional and Criminal matters. Katju was appointed Additional Judge of the Allahabad High Court on 6 August 1973. He became the Chief Justice of the same High Court in 1988.

Katju died in 2004.
