= Panth Piploda Province =

Province of British India

Coordinates: 23.35°N 75.43°E

Panth Piploda
- Province of British India
- 1928–1947
- Flag
- Area
  - 1941: 65 km^{2} (25 sq mi)
- Population
  - 1941: 5,627
- History
  - Chief Commissionership established: 1928
  - Merged with Ratlam District: 1947
| Preceded by | Succeeded by |
| Bombay Presidency | Ratlam district |

Panth Piploda was a province of British India. It is located in present-day Ratlam district of Madhya Pradesh state of central India.

Panth Piploda was British India's smallest province, with an area of 65 km^{2} (25 sq mi), and a population of 5267 (male 2666, female 2601) (1941 census). It was located in the Malwa region, and consisted of several separate enclaves, bounded by the princely states of Gwalior, Jaora, and Dewas. The province was governed by a chief commissioner appointed by the Governor-General of India.

== History ==
Panth Piploda was a small tract of territory comprising only 12 villages, which were held by five different thakurs. In c. 1765, the Peshwa of the Maratha Empire assigned the revenues from the villages to the family of Sambhaji Attaji, a Deshastha Brahmin. This ruling family was later known as the family of the Khandekar Pandits. The arrangement made by the Peshwa was respected by the British when they took over Panth Piploda from the Marathas in 1817. The ruling family did not have any proprietary rights whatever in these villages and were mere tankadars (recipients of the cash allowance). This cash allowance was paid to them by the Political Agent in Malwa Agency who realized it from the thakurs in whose territories the villages lay. The estate was managed by a Superintendent with headquarters at Kharwa (also spelled as Kharua), overseen by the Political Agent at Malwa. In 1936, there were two guaranteed tankadars, who received payments totaling Rs. 46,000.

On 1 November 1928, Panth Piploda was created as a Chief Commissionership by Proclamation of the Governor-General in Council, with the Political Agent in Central India being appointed Chief Commissioner.

In the early 1930s, it was suggested that Panth Piploda be granted to Indore State for ease of administration, however this suggestion was rejected and Panth Piploda's status as a Chief Commissioner's Province was upheld by the Government of India Act 1935.

On 15 Aug 1947 it became part of independent India.

=== Chief Commissioners ===
- 1935–1940 Kenneth Samuel Fitze (1887–1960)
- 1940–1942 Gerald Thomas Fisher (1887–1965)
- 1942–1946 Walter Fendall Campbell KCIE (1894–1973)
- 1946–1947 Henry Mortimer Poulton (1898–1973)
