= Akshayavata =

Sacred tree in Jainism and Hinduism

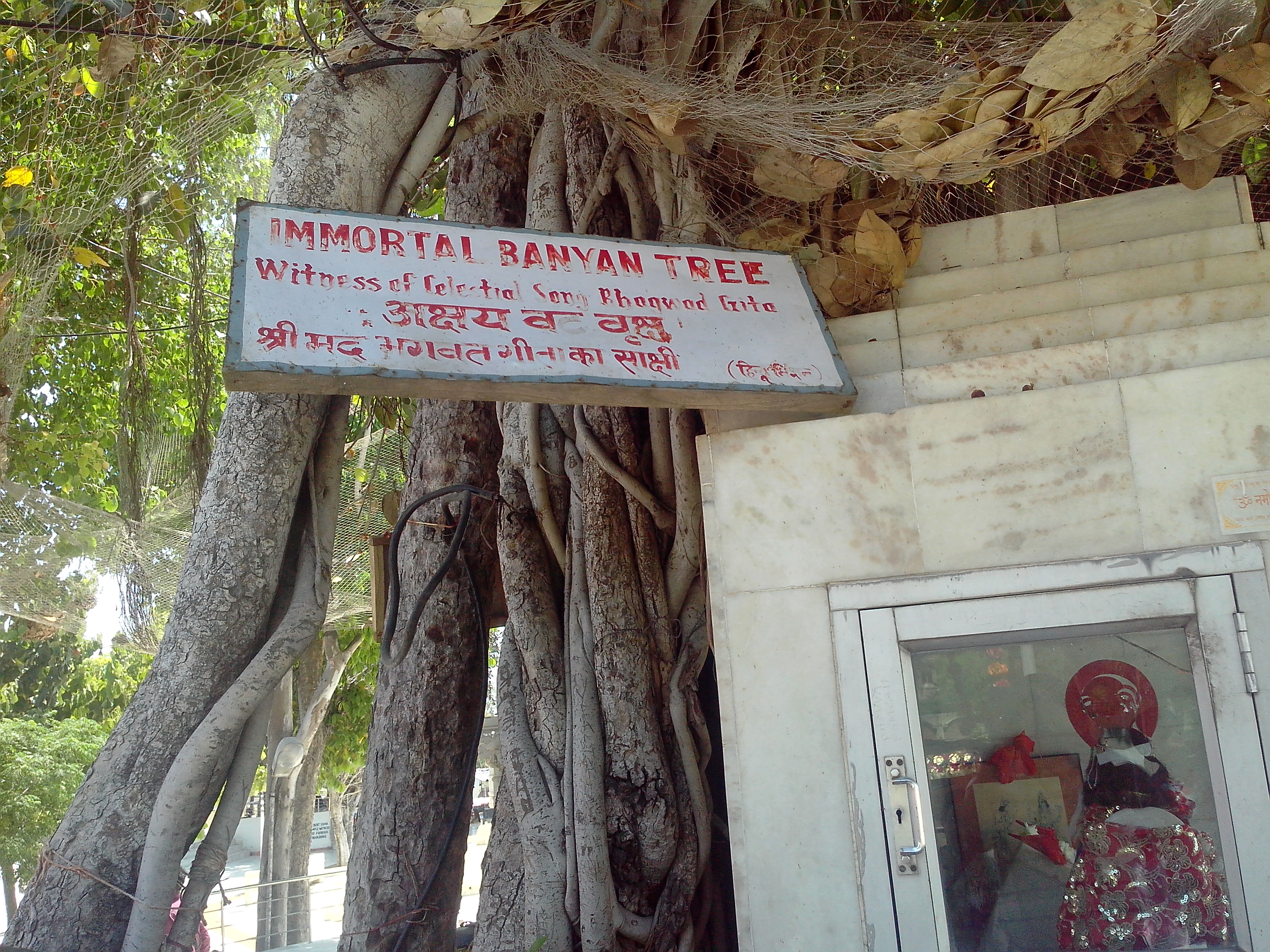
A tree at Kurukshetra, claimed to be the Akshayavata

Akshayavata (Sanskrit: अक्षयवट, romanized: Akṣayavaṭa, lit. 'undecaying banyan'), also rendered Akshayavat, is a sacred banyan tree mentioned in the Hindu mythology and in Jainism. It is also the name of a sacred lake mentioned in the Puranas.

== In Hinduism ==
The Padma Purana states that those who venerate the Akshayavata with devotion are freed from sins.

The Akshayavata is mentioned as a holy site of Gaya in the Mahabharata.

According to legend, once, the sage Markandeya asked Narayana to show him a taste of his divine power. Narayana caused a pralaya, flooding the entire world for a moment, during which only the Akshayavata could be seen above the water level.

According to regional tradition, the emperor Jahangir cut the Akshayavata to its roots and hammered a red-hot iron cauldron on its stump so that it would not grow again. However, within a year, the tree began to grow again.

== In Jainism ==
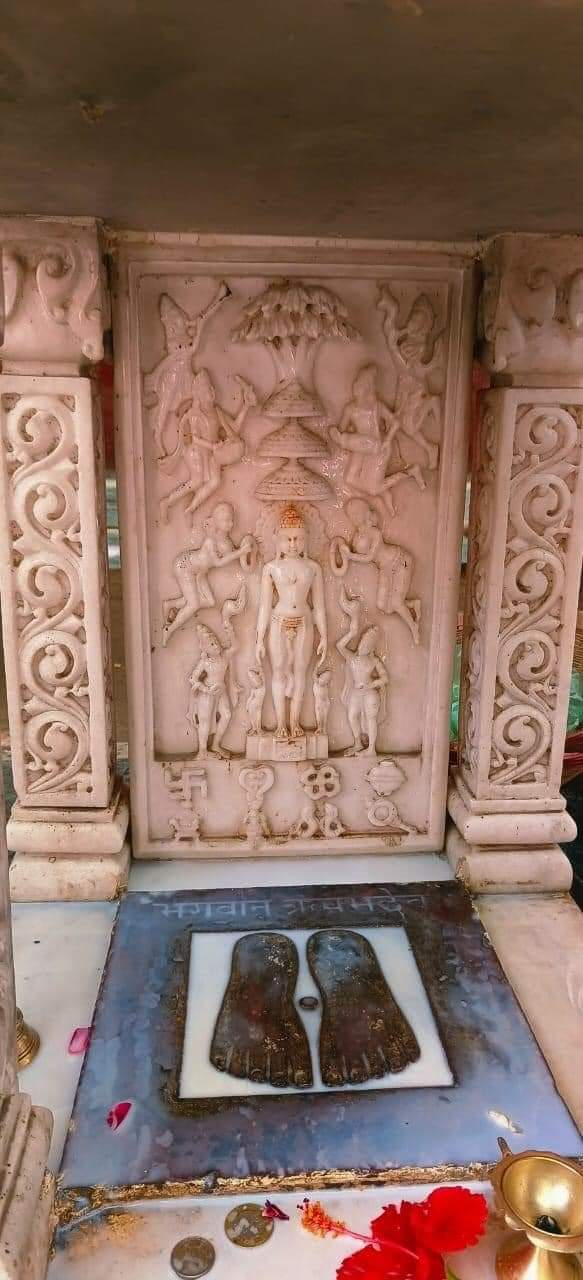
Ancient footprints and a Śvetāmbara Jain idol of Rishabhanatha commemorating the place of his omniscience under the Akshayavata tree

According to Jain scriptures, it is the place where Rishabhanatha, the first Tirthankara of the current time cycle, attained omniscience after a 1000-year long penance. Omniscience in Jainism is considered to be an eternal and universal knowledge that never fades. Hence, the tree was also popularly known as 'Akṣayavata'.

The place where this tree is situated (in Prayagraj) is of great significance to Jains and a Śvetāmbara Jain shrine housing Rishabhanatha's footprints was also built there. Originally, sandalwood footprints of Rishabhanatha were placed beneath the tree, which were later replaced with stone replicas following theft. Other significant events associated to the place where this tree is situated include:

- Rishabhanatha's attainment of omniscience beneath the Akshayavata tree.
- The creation of the first samavasarana (transl. multistoreyed divine preaching hall) of this Avasarpiṇī.
- The establishment of the first Chaturvidha Jain Sangh (fourfold Jain congregation) of this Avasarpiṇī.
- Marudevi's attainment of moksha, marking the first moksha of this Avasarpiṇī.
- The composition of the first Dvādaśāṅgī scriptures by Ganadhara Pundarika, a disciple of Rishabhanatha.

== Identification ==
A tree in Prayagraj has been described as Akshayavata in the Prayag Mahatmya of the Matsya Purana.

In The Encyclopaedia Asiatica (1976), Edward Balfour identifies a banyan tree mentioned in Ramayana with the tree at Prayag. Rama, Lakshmana, and Sita are said to have rested beneath this tree. The Chinese Buddhist pilgrim Xuanzang mentions a tree (a stump with few branches) which was said to be the home of a man-eating demon. As part of a custom, some pilgrims would offer themselves at the nearby temple. Xuanzang mentions that the tree was surrounded by human bones. Alexander Cunningham identified this tree with the Akshayavata at Prayag. Rishabha (Jain tirthankar) is also said to have practised tapasya beneath the historical Akshayavata at Prayag.

Currently, a sacred fig tree located within the Patalpuri Temple at the Allahabad Fort is worshipped as the Akshayavata described in ancient texts. As of 2011, a permission from the Commandant of Prayagraj Fort's Ordnance Depot is needed to visit this tree. On one day during the Kumbh Mela, the site is open to all the pilgrims. However, a popular opinion is that the Patalpuri Temple tree is not the authentic Akshayavata: the real Akshayavata is in another underground temple inside the Fort. When the British gained control of the Allahabad Fort after the Treaty of Prayagraj in 1765, they did not want general public to access the sensitive parts of the fort. So, the shrine was moved to the fringes of the fort compound, that is, the present-day Patalpuri Temple. According to the Welsh travel writer Fanny Parkes, who visited both the tree sites in 1831, when the original Akshayavata chamber was closed, the local Brahmins set up the stump of a ber tree in Patalpuri. They claimed that it was a branch of the original Akshayavata that had penetrated through the walls. Parkes states that the local Hindus of Prayag knew about this and did not worship the false Akshayavata. An 18th-century map of the Fort from the British Library confirms this: the location of the original temple is shown in the center of the fort; while the present-day Patalpuri Temple is on the outskirts of the Fort. In the 1950s, Shiva Nath Katju also claimed that the "tree" placed in the Patalpuri Temple was only a log that was replaced by the priests every 4–5 years. The commander of the fort acknowledged his claim as true.

A tree at Gaya, Bihar and another tree at Varanasi are also worshipped as the Akshayavata. The Bodhi tree is said to be a manifestation of the Akashayavat at Prayag.

According to Tibetan Buddhist tradition, Buddha is said to have planted a seed of the Prayag's Akshayavata next to Mount Kailash on a mountain known as the Palace of the Medicine Buddha.

== See also ==
- Ashvattha, mythological world tree
- Kalpavriksha, a mythological, wish-fulfilling divine tree
