= Markandey Katju =

Indian judge (born 1946)

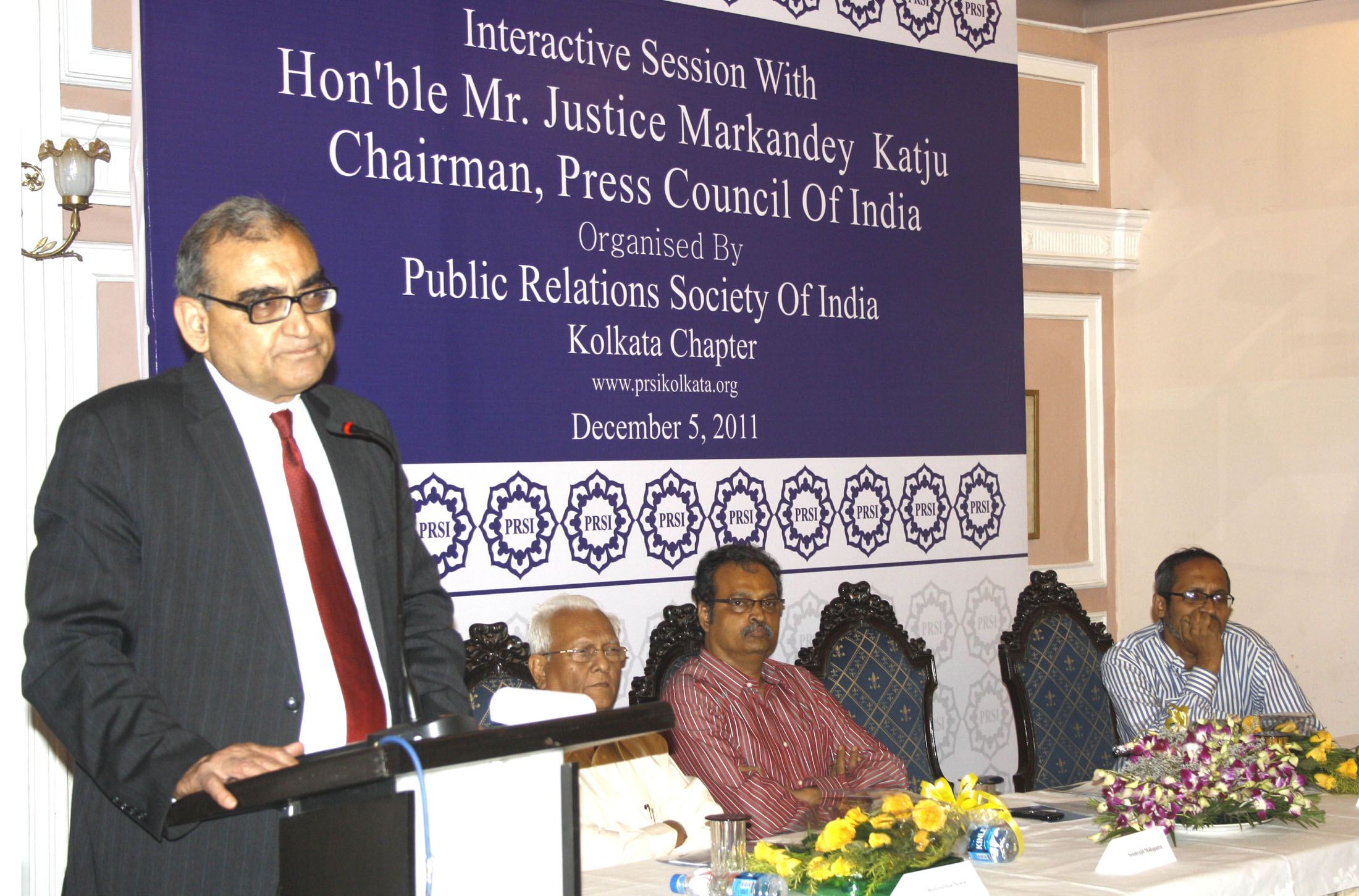
- Katju, addressing at an interactive session at Kolkata on 5 December 2011.

Chairman of the Press Council of India
- In office 5 October 2011 – 5 October 2014

Judge of the Supreme Court of India
- In office 10 April 2006 – 19 September 2011

Chief Justice of the Delhi High Court
- In office 12 October 2005 – 10 April 2006

Chief Justice of the Madras High Court
- In office 28 November 2004 – 10 October 2005

Chairman of the Indian Reunification Association
- In office 2 April 2017 – 21 February 2021

Patron of the Indian Reunification Association
- Incumbent
- Assumed office 21 February 2021

Personal details
- Born: 20 September 1946 (age 80) Lucknow, United Provinces, British India
- Spouse: Rupa
- Relations: Kailash Nath Katju (grandfather)
- Parent: Shiva Nath Katju
- Website: markandeykatju.com

Markandey Katju is an Indian jurist and a former judge of Supreme Court of India. He also was chairman of the Press Council of India from 2011 to 2014. He is the son of politician Shiva Nath Katju and grandson of Kailash Nath Katju. He is the founder and patron of the Indian Reunification Association (IRA), an organisation that advocates for the peaceful reunification of what is now Pakistan and Bangladesh with India under a secular government.

== Early life and education ==
Markandey Katju was born on 20 September 1946 at Lucknow in a Kashmiri Pandit Hindu family. Katju's family consisted mainly of lawyers who took a keen interest in politics and current affairs. His father, Shiva Nath Katju, was a judge and an Indian National Congress politician and was elected a member of the Uttar Pradesh Legislative Assembly and the Uttar Pradesh Legislative Council. His grandfather, Kailash Nath Katju, was one of India's leading lawyers and participated in the country's freedom movement. His grandfather also served as the governor of Orissa and West Bengal, the Chief Minister of Madhya Pradesh, the Union Home, Law, and the Defence Minister. Katju's uncle, B.N. Katju was the Chief Justice of Allahabad High Court. The academic Tilottama Mukherji Tharoor, the first wife of Shashi Tharoor, is also a cousin to Katju. Katju topped the merit list of Allahabad university's LL.B. examination in 1967. He was awarded an Honoris Causa by a Doctor of Philosophy from Shri Lal Bahadur Shastri Sanskrit University, New Delhi, for his book Mimansa Rules of Interpretation. Katju was also awarded an Honorary Doctorate of Law from Banaras Hindu University.

Katju is married to Rupa and has a son and a daughter.

== Career ==
Katju started his law practice at the Allahabad High Court from 1970 to 1991. He specialized in Labour Law, Taxation and Writ Petitions. He has also worked as Standing Counsel for the Income Tax Department. He was elevated to the Bench of Allahabad High Court in 1991 and was appointed acting Chief Justice of Allahabad High Court in August 2004. Katju was appointed Chief Justice of Madras High Court in November 2004, and Chief Justice of Delhi High Court in October 2005. He was then elevated to the Supreme Court of India in April 2006, from which he retired on 19 September 2011; after having served in the judiciary for nearly 20 years. He subsequently served as the Chairman of the Press Council of India for three years.

His courtroom was one of the fastest in the Supreme Court, disposing of 100+ matters in a week. His strong belief in judicial restraint has been contrasted with some unconventional opinions he delivered. In many of his interviews, he said that the Judiciary is beyond redemption.

Katju currently serves as the patron of the Indian Reunification Association (IRA), an organization he solely founded that advocates for the reunification of Pakistan and Bangladesh with India under a secular government.

== Bibliography ==
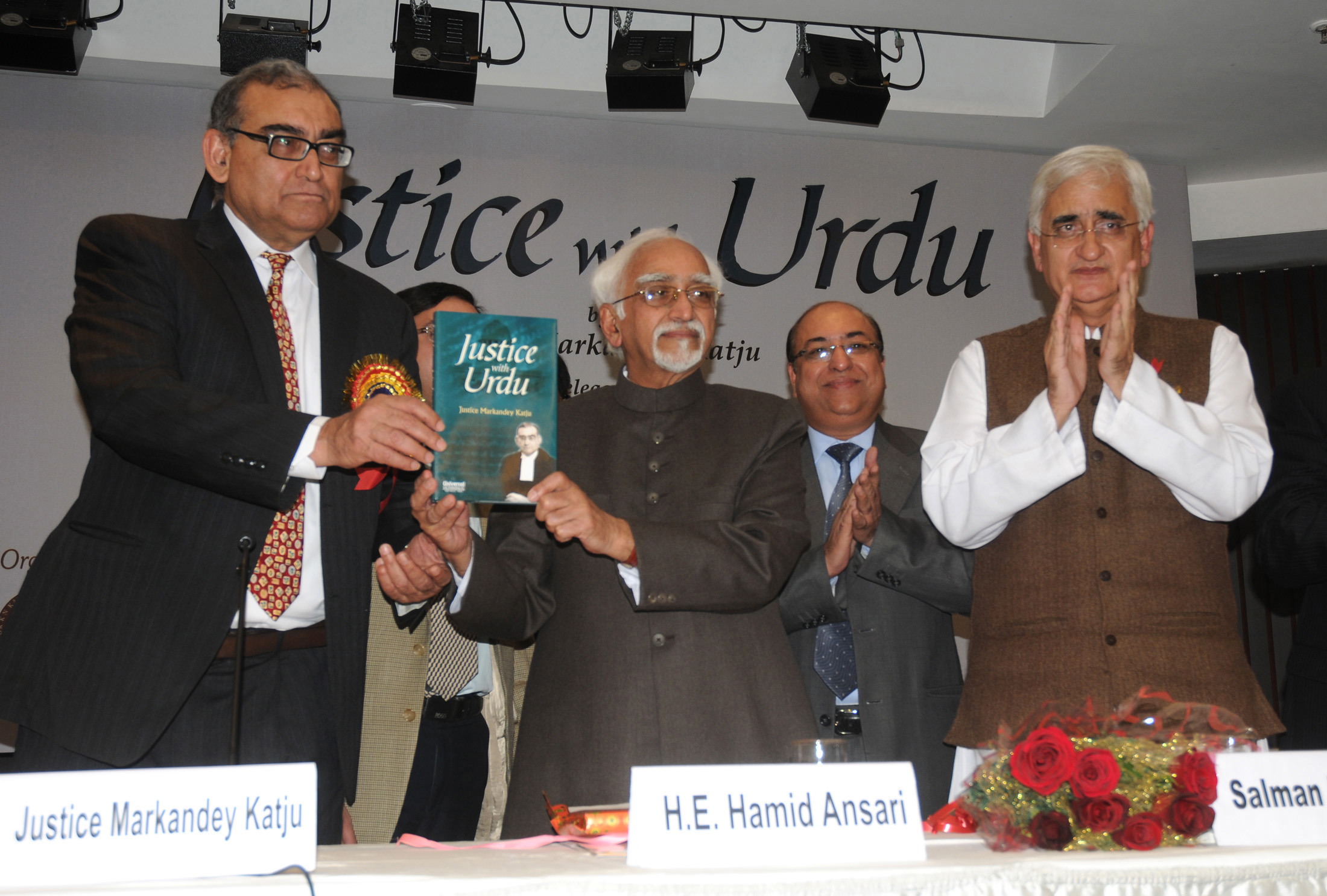
Indian Vice President Mohammad Hamid Ansari releasing the book entitled Justice with Urdu authored by Justice Markandey Katju, in New Delhi, 2012. The Union Minister for Law and Justice and Minority Affairs, Salman Khurshid is also seen.

He has written several books, including the following:

- Mimansa Rules of Interpretation
- Law in the Scientific Era
- Interpretation of Taxing Statutes
- Domestic Enquiry
- Justice with Urdu
- Whither Indian Judiciary

Some of his articles and speeches include:

- Injustice to Urdu in India; published in the Tribune on 3 August 2008
- Sanskrit as a language of Science; a speech delivered in the Indian Institute of Science, Bangalore on 13 October 2009
- Kalidas-Ghalib Academy for Mutual Understanding
- The Role of Art, Literature and Media
- Looking back at the Caste System
- The Ideal of Women's emancipation
- Importance of Liberty and Democracy in India
- Global Economic Scenario
- The Hart-Fuller Debate by Justice Markandey Katju – Judge, Allahabad High Court
- The Role of Media in India

== Controversies and criticism ==
- Addressing a seminar organized by the South Asia Media Commission, and subsequently in several articles and interviews; Katju said that "90 per cent of Indians are fools" and "20 per cent Hindus and 20 per cent Muslims, are communal." He tried to justify his statement on the grounds that a majority of Indians vote on the basis of caste or community, and not merit, citing the example of Phoolan Devi, a dacoit and murderer, who was allegedly elected to Parliament even though she belonged to a backward caste. He also explained that it was meant to awaken people to the realities of social evils like casteism and communalism in the country, after two Lucknow students, Tanaya and Aditya Thakur, had sent him a legal notice.
- Katju has criticized Salman Rushdie, arguing that the author is over-praised. He said that his novel 'Satanic Verses' has deeply hurt Muslim sensitivities and that an individual's freedom of speech has to harmonize with the public interest. He also noted that Article 19(2) provides for 'reasonable restrictions' on the freedom of speech in the "interest of the security of the State, public order, decency, morality, etc."
- Katju landed in legal trouble for his remark on his Facebook page on 10 October 2016; after an SDJM court in Odisha admitted a petition over it. This created a vehement public outcry in Odisha. In his post, Katju had written: "I was asked to write about the Oriyas (Odias). What is there to write about these poor, dirty chaps? Ever since they got a thrashing at the hands of Ashoka in the battle of Kalinga they have been a dejected lot. Now all they have with them are a lot of pots (Patras), big pots (Mahapatras), and supposedly intelligent kings (Patnaiks). And of course, they have one Lord Jaggannath, to whom they pray every day for revenge on the abominable and disgusting Biharis." A day after tendering an apology for his alleged derogatory remarks about Odisha and its people, former Supreme Court judge Markandey Katju on Saturday, claimed to receive a flower bouquet and a "get well soon" card from the Delhi Odia Students Association. This was informed by Katju himself through a Facebook post.
- The Supreme Court on 17 October 2016 summoned former judge Markandey Katju for insinuating that the top court had "grievously erred" by not imposing the death penalty on Govindachamy in the Soumya rape-murder case. The top court has asked Katju to explain on 11 November 2016, how and where it went wrong, in not imposing a death sentence on Govindachamy. "He (Justice Katju) is a respected gentleman. We request him to come in person and debate his Facebook post criticizing the judgment. Let him come to the court and let's debate over the fundamental flaws in our verdict," a bench of Justice Ranjan Gogoi and Justice U. U. Lalit said and issued a notice to Justice Katju.

=== Courtroom ===
- Comments on a judgment given by a single judge in Allahabad High Court and in light of alleged corruption, a bench of Katju and Gyan Sudha Misra had observed that '"Something is rotten in the State of Denmark," said Shakespeare in Hamlet, and it can similarly be said, "something is rotten in the Allahabad High Court, as this case illustrates."' The Allahabad High Court had taken a strong exception to the apex court's remarks that "something was rotten" and there was "rampant uncle judge syndrome" in the high court, but the Supreme Court had refused to expunge the 'rotten remark.' The Government had backed the Supreme Court in this connection.
- In May 2007, while hearing a multi-crore corruption case in the Supreme Court, Katju had made the oral observation "The law does not permit us to do it, but otherwise we would prefer to hang the corrupt." In March 2013, Katju had said that it will take India 20 years to defeat corruption. According to Katju, the reason for corruption in India today is that Indian society is in a transitional phase. As the country was moving from a feudal society to an industrial society, the old moral code was being destroyed but the new moral code of industrial society had not yet been put in place.

=== Politics ===
- Arun Jaitley, once a close friend, criticized Katju for selective targeting two non-Congress state governments in Gujarat and Bihar and called for his resignation as PCI chairman. Jaitley said that Katju has failed every test on which a Judge whether sitting or retired could be judged. Jaitley alleged that Katju had a political bias with respect to the burning of the Sabarmati Express in Godhra. Katju responded claiming that Jaitley was "twisting facts" and "talking rubbish" and advised him to quit politics. Katju claimed that it was not his report but a report of a three-member committee of the Press Council of India which had prepared a report censuring the Bihar government for lack of press freedom in Bihar. Referring to Jaitley's comment about being against giving post-retirement jobs to retired judges, Katju reminded Jaitley that a large number of post-retirement jobs had been given to judges when the NDA government was in power and when Jaitley was Law Minister. Katju also claimed that Jaitley's accusation of Katju targeting only non-Congress governments was false since he had also targeted Congress governments in the past.
- Katju has also been critical of West Bengal Chief Minister Mamata Banerjee for calling student Tania Bhardwaj a Maoist in a public discussion, for ordering the arrest of farmer Siladitya Choudhary after calling him Maoist when he had only asked her why she has not kept her pre-election promises, and for ordering the arrest of Professor Ambikesh Mahapatra for circulating a cartoon lampooning Banerjee. Other political parties including the CPM, the BJP, and the Congress had joined in the criticism of Mamata on these issues. Katju had also warned police and administrative authorities that they could face action for following 'illegal orders' as happened to the Nazi war criminals during the Nuremberg trials. "The West Bengal officials should take a lesson from the Nuremberg verdict if they do not wish to suffer a similar fate," Katju had said. Subsequently, the West Bengal Human Rights Commission had ordered Rs 50,000 compensation to be paid to Professor Mahapatra for the manner in which he was arrested and detained.

=== Hindustani as link language of India ===
Markandey Katju has supported Hindustani, that is Urdu and Hindi, as the link language of India. He also said that there should be no forceful imposition of Hindustani.

=== Indian Reunification and the existence of Pakistan ===
Katju's views on the legitimacy of Pakistan as a nation have come under criticism in Pakistan including Shamshad Ahmad, a former Pakistani foreign secretary. On several occasions, Katju has said in articles and lectures that he does not recognize Pakistan as a legitimate country, as the whole basis is the two nation theory and he does not accept this. Katju has also claimed that the eventual reunification of India and Pakistan is the only solution to the Pakistan Kashmir issue.

Katju justified his stance in a leading Pakistani newspaper The Nation, where he reiterated that the only solution to the ongoing dispute is the reunification of India, Pakistan, and Bangladesh under a strong, secular, modern-minded government. He expanded on the reasons for his support for a reunified India in an article for Newslaundry.

Katju's contribution to the release of fishermen arrested along the coastal areas on the border of India has earned him praise from human rights groups of Pakistan.

=== View on Jammu and Kashmir ===
Markandey Katju, himself an ethnic Kashmiri, maintains that Kashmir's handicraft industry, a major part of the union territory's economy, is dependent upon other parts of India, where these products are sold by Kashmiris; Katju opines that the "secession" of Kashmir would cause its economy to suffer, leading to high rates of unemployment among Kashmiris. He, being diametrically opposed to the partition of India, holds that the ultimate solution to the Kashmir conflict is the reunification of what is now Pakistan with India.

=== Allegation of improper compromises in the collegium system of appointing judges ===
On 20 July 2014, Justice Katju sparked off a new controversy when on his blog, he alleged that in the year 2004, a corrupt judge was given an extension and later a permanent post due to strong political backing. He wrote that he himself raised concern about the conduct of this judge and after due probe from CJI, and his doubt was found to be true. However, this judge had political backing from a political party in Tamil Nadu, and this party threatened to withdraw the support to the UPA government if this corrupt judge was not given an extension. He also alleged that a prominent Congress leader arranged an extension to save the UPA government.

After his blog post, several parties and social groups raised concern over political interference in the posting of the judges; however some of them also questioned the timing and purpose behind this revelation. In January 2017, Markanday Katju said that proceedings of judges selection should be televised.

=== View on gay relationships ===
On 25 December 2014 Justice Katju fueled controversy by saying that he regarded gay relationships to be "humbug and nonsense." However, he later clarified that he has partially changed his mind after discussing the issue with others and accepted that he was partially wrong. After this, his position was that gay relationships should not be held to be a criminal offence, and this provision in the Indian penal code should be swiftly annulled. However, he continues to regard gay relationships as "unnatural."

=== Praise ===
Former Assistant Solicitor General of India Amarendra Sharan has praised Katju. Sharan says on Katju, "You can criticise his views, but you can't criticise the man. His integrity is unimpeachable." The noted jurist Fali Nariman commented that Katju is a person who doesn't merely pretend to support human rights but lives it every moment of his life. The former editor of The Times of India, Dilip Padgaonkar, has said that Katju is "an individual whose reputation for uprightness has been consistently above board."

=== Confrontation with Indian Parliament ===
In March 2015, in his blog, Katju called Mahatma Gandhi, Subhash Chandra Bose and Rabindranath Tagore as British and Japanese agents respectively. Both the house of the Indian Parliament condemned his remarks and passed a resolution against him. Katju has filed a petition before the Supreme Court of India seeking a quashing of the said resolutions.

=== Sexism ===
Katju has been criticised for sexist comments on social media. In 2015, he made comments comparing Shazia Ilmi to Kiran Bedi, saying: "If Shazia had been made their chief minister candidate, the BJP would have definitely won the Delhi elections. People vote for beautiful faces [....] Even a person like me who does not vote would have voted for Shazia." In 2020 he was criticized when screenshots of an exchange he had with a woman on Facebook went viral when he told her that "good girls go to sleep early."

=== Thoughts on the Israel Palestine Conflict ===
Katju believes that Hamas was provided with weapons by countries like China and Russia on October 7, the attack which intensified the Israel-Palestine conflict.

Katju considers Israel an illegitimate state
