= Ratlam district =

- Municipal Corporation
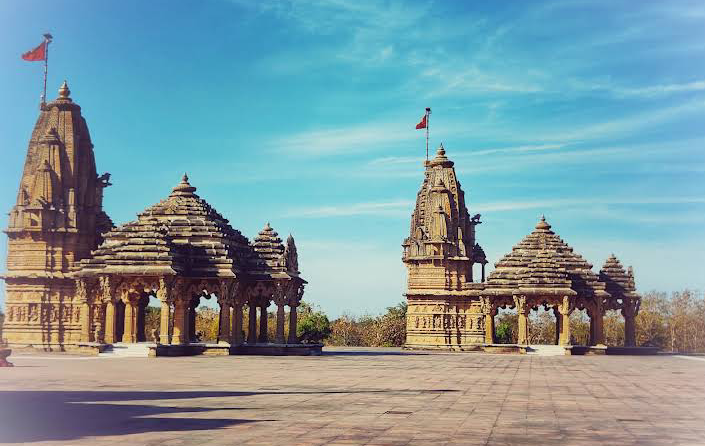
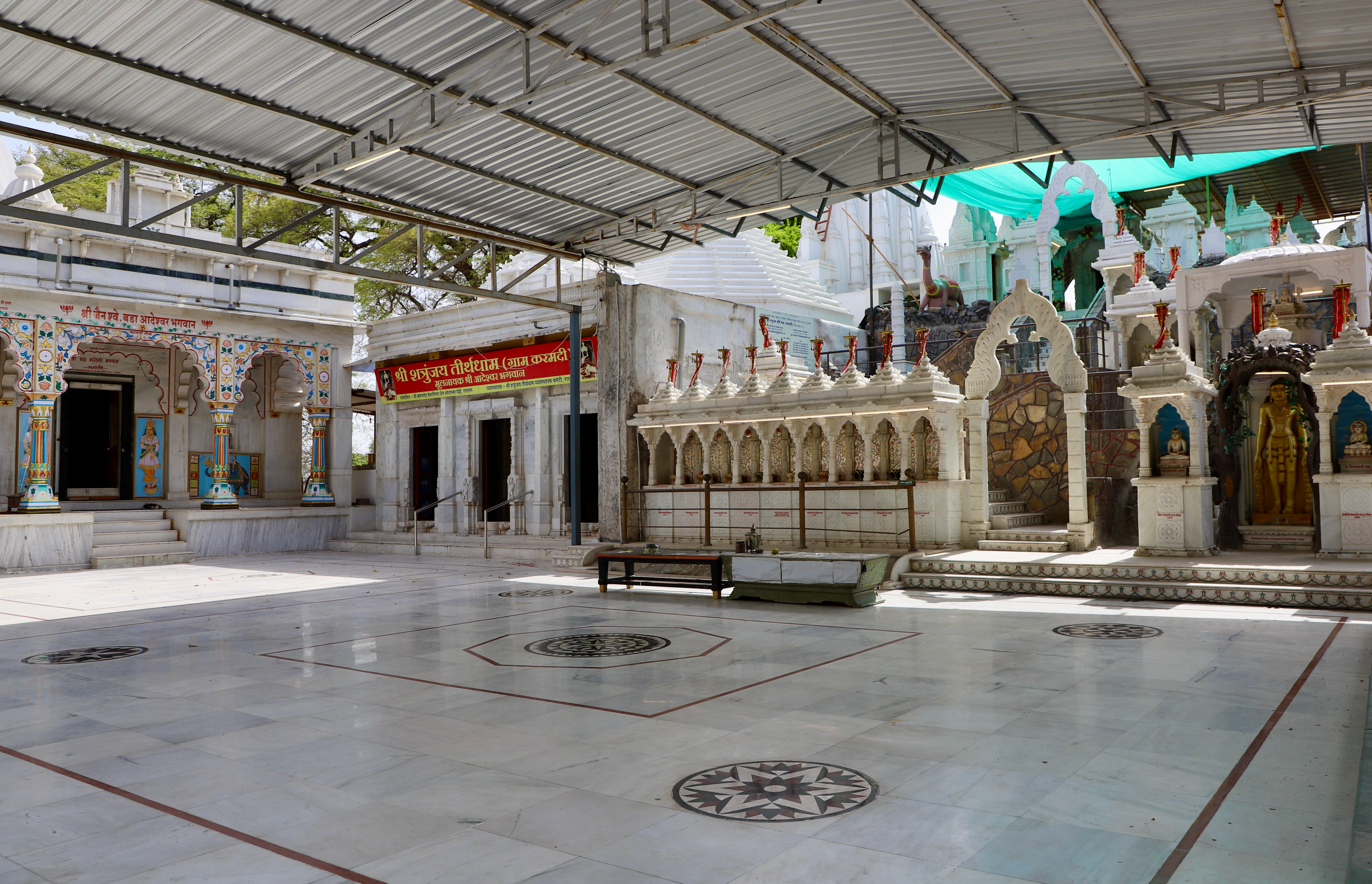
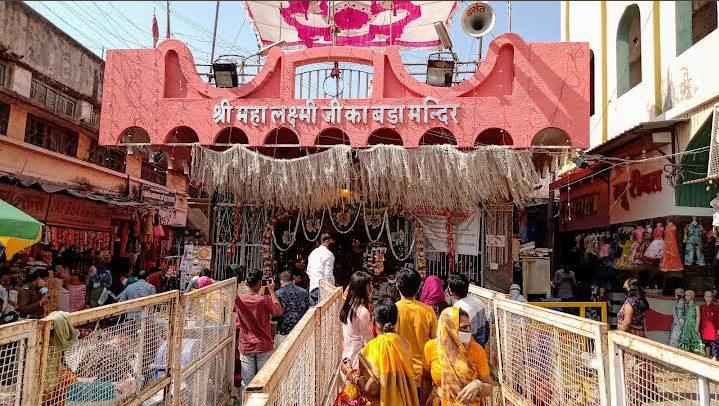
- Manglay Mandir, Sailana Palace, Jain Mandir, Mahalakshmi Temple

- Location of Ratlam district in Madhya Pradesh
- Coordinates (Ratlam): 23.33°N 75.05°E
- Country: India
- State: Madhya Pradesh
- Division: Ujjain
- Established: 26-1-1949
- Headquarters: Ratlam
- Tehsils: 9

Government
  - Lok Sabha constituencies: Ratlam

Area
  - Total: 4,861 km^{2} (1,877 sq mi)

Population (2011)
  - Total: 1,455,069
  - Density: 299.3/km^{2} (775.3/sq mi)

Demographics
  - Literacy: 68.03 per cent
  - Sex ratio: 973
- Time zone: UTC+05:30 (IST)
- Major highways: NH 79, NH 927A
- Website: ratlam.nic.in

Ratlam district (Hindi pronunciation: [ɾət̪.laːm]) is a district of Madhya Pradesh state in central India. The town of Ratlam is administrative headquarters of the district.Ratlam district is located in western part of Madhya Pradesh.

== Geography ==
Ratlam District has an area of 4,861 square kilometres (1,877 sq mi). It is bounded by Mandsaur District to the north, Jhalawar District of Rajasthan state to the northwest, Ujjain District to the east, Dhar District to the south, Jhabua District to the southwest, and Pratapgarh District of Rajasthan to the west. It is divided into nine tehsils and is home to 9 at and 1,063 villages (as of 2001). The district is part of Ujjain Division.

== Tehsils ==
1. Ratlam
2. Bajna
3. Jaora
4. Sailana
5. Raoti
6. Piploda
7. Tal
8. Aalot
9. Namli

== Information ==
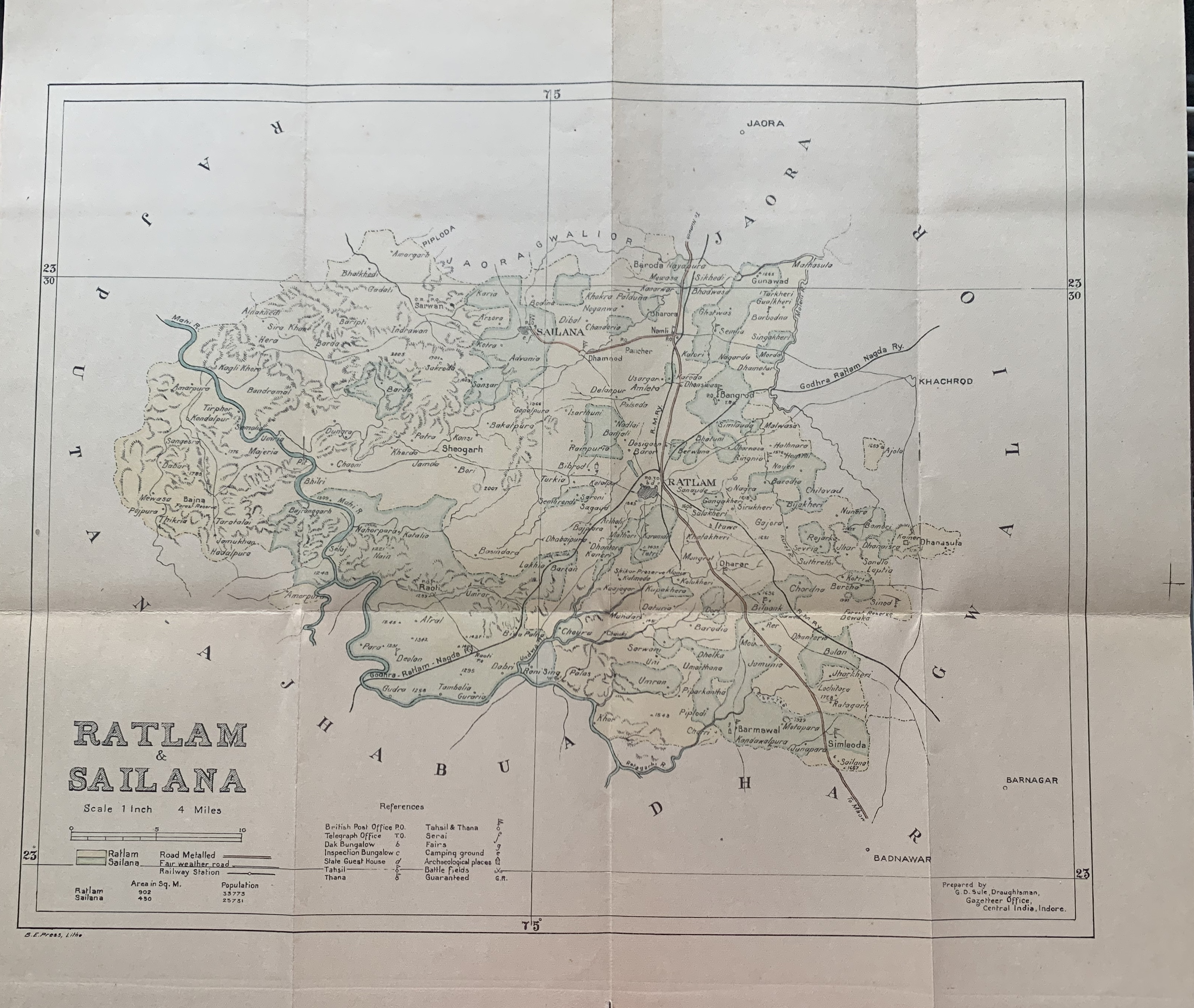
Ratlam (yellow) and Sailana (green) States held major parts of present day Ratlam district.

Ratlam District was created after Indian independence in 1947, primarily out of the territories of the princely states of Ratlam State and Sailana State, the rulers of Ratlam and Sailana were descendants of Maharaja Ratan Singh Rathore. Other states included Jaora State which was created by the British in 1818 and Piploda State which was a tributary of Jaora but later became a small non-gunsalute state. Ratlam District was part of the new state of Madhya Bharat. The major stop for tourism in Ratlam district is the town of Sailana which is known for its cactus garden, Palace, Kharmor Bird Sanctuary and the cave temples of Kedareshwar. Ratlam city is known for Garadu (fried Yam), Sev and Gold. Ratlam also has a DRM office of Railway.

== Demographics ==
Historical population
Year	Pop.	±% p.a.
1901	238,624	—
1911	244,513	+0.24%
1921	245,021	+0.02%
1931	290,437	+1.71%
1941	335,147	+1.44%
1951	381,719	+1.31%
1961	483,521	+2.39%
1971	626,534	+2.62%
1981	782,729	+2.25%
1991	971,888	+2.19%
2001	1,215,393	+2.26%
2011	1,455,069	+1.82%

Religions in Ratlam district (2011)
Religion	Percent
Hinduism	87.08%
Islam	10.38%
Jainism	2.01%
Other or not stated	0.53%

According to the 2011 census Ratlam District has a population of 1,455,069 roughly equal to the nation of Eswatini or the US state of Hawaii. This gives it a ranking of 342nd in India (out of a total of 640). The district has a population density of 299 inhabitants per square kilometre (770/sq mi) . Its population growth rate over the decade of 2001-2011 was 19.67%. Ratlam has a sex ratio of 973 females for every 1,000 males, and a literacy rate of 68.03%. 29.90% of the population lives in urban areas. Scheduled Castes and Tribes made up 13.65% and 28.16% of the population respectively.

Languages of Ratlam district (2011)
1. Malvi (42.3%)
2. Hindi (41.4%)
3. Bhili (13.6%)
4. Urdu (1.27%)
5. Others (1.44%)

At the time of the 2011 Census of India, 42.33% of the population in the district spoke Malvi, 41.38% Hindi, 13.59% Bhili and 1.27% Urdu as their first language.

== Tourist places ==
- Dholawad Dam
- Bibrod Tirth
- Husain Tekri
- Cactus Garden Sailan
- Kharmour Bird Sanctuary
- Bilapakeshwara Temple
- Kalikamata Temple
- Kedareshwar Temple
- Dharad Mahakaleshwar temple, Ramola temple, and Bhuteshwar mahadev temple
