= Jaora =

Jaora Gulshanabag
- City
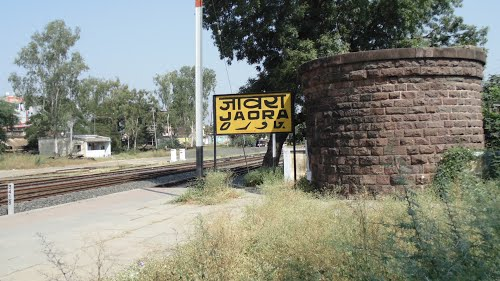

- Location in Madhya Pradesh, India Jaora (India)
- Coordinates: 23.63°N 75.13°E
- Country: India
- State: Madhya Pradesh
- District: Ratlam

Government
  - Type: Municipal Council
  - Body: Jaora Municipal Council

Area
  - Total: 30 km^{2} (12 sq mi)
- Elevation: 459 m (1,506 ft)

Population (2011)
  - Total: 74,907
  - Density: 2,500/km^{2} (6,500/sq mi)

Languages
  - Official: Hindi
- Time zone: UTC+5:30 (IST)
- PIN: 457 226
- Telephone code: 07414
- Vehicle registration: MP-43

Jaora is a city and a municipality in Ratlam district in the Indian state of Madhya Pradesh. Jaora is located in the Malwa region, between Ratlam and Mandsaur. It was the capital of the Jaora princely state of Jaora before Independence. During the Mourning of Muharram, thousands of people from all over the world visit the shrine of Hussain Tekri. Jains visit Jaora as a place that the Jain ascetic Rajendrasuri practiced tapasya.

== Demographics ==
As of the 2011 India census, Jaora tehsil had a population of 243070. Males constitute 51% of the population and females 49%. Jaora has an average literacy rate of 62%, higher than the national average of 59.5%: male literacy is 70%, and female literacy is 54%. In Jaora, 16% of the population is under 6 years of age.

== Jaora princely state ==
The state was founded by 'Abdu'l Ghafur Muhammad Khan, a Muslim of Afghan descent. He was a cavalry officer serving the Pindari leader Amir Khan. He later served the Holkar Maharaja of Indore, subduing Rajput territories in northern Malwa and annexing their lands. The expansion stopped after he was defeated by Raja Lakshman Singh of Sailana, who made him swear not to trouble the local Rajputs after the victory. The Nawab later swore allegiance to the British to save his newly found state. The Nawabs of Jaora were very loyal to the British and were responsible for destroying many Rebels during the mutiny period. In return for the services, the state was confirmed by the British government in 1818 by the Treaty of Mandsaur.

== Places of interest ==
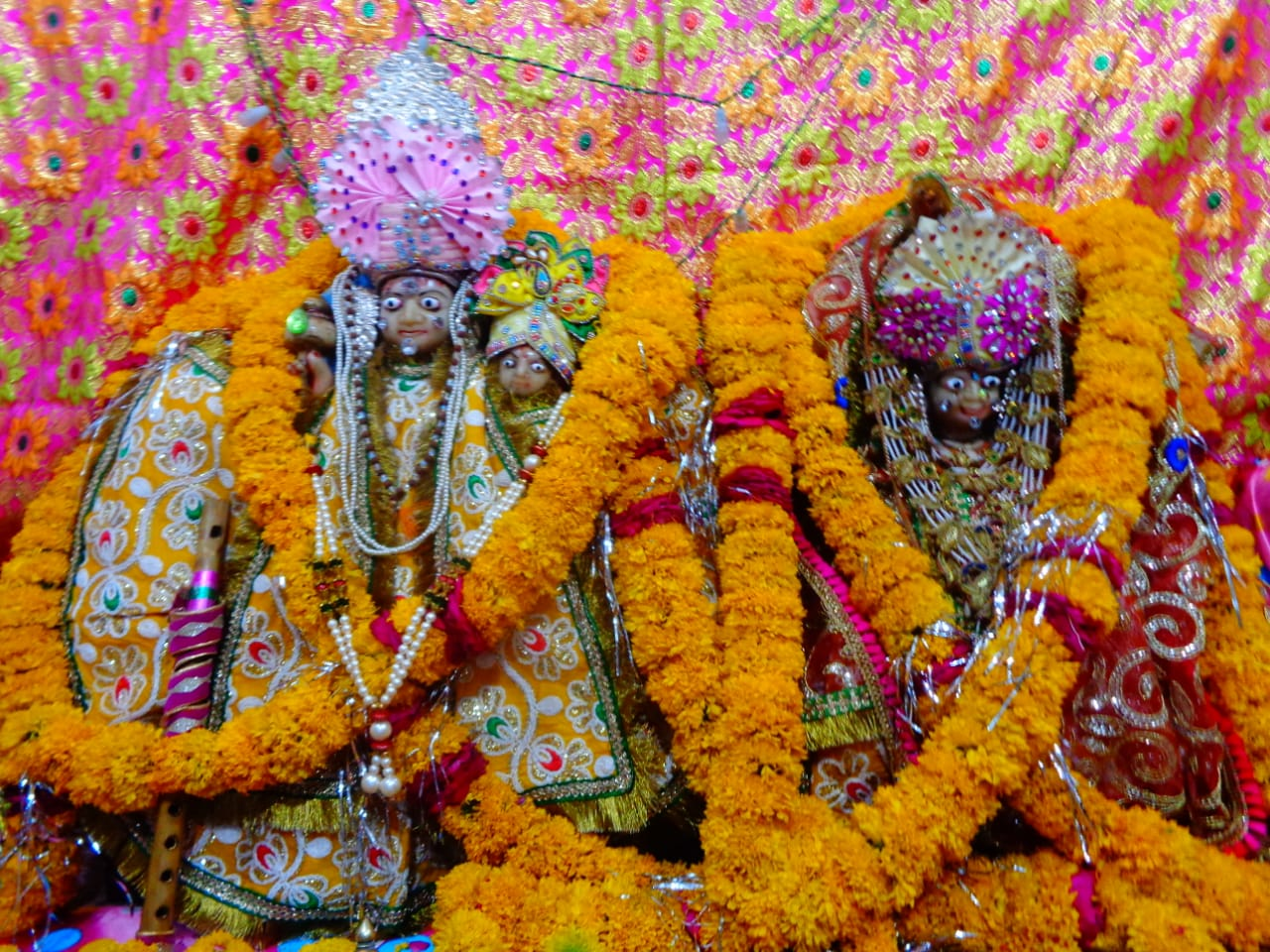
Shree Lakshmikant Mandir

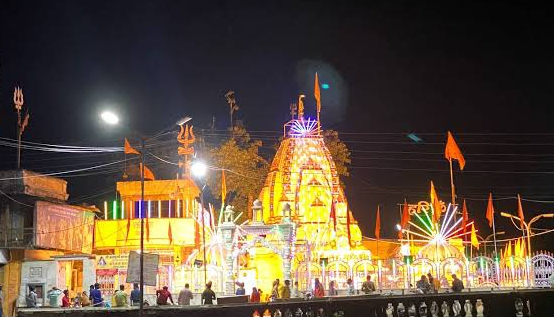
Jagnath Mahadev Mandir

There are two city parks, Chota Baagh and Bada Baagh. The Hussain Tekri shrine on the edge of the town attracts thousands of visitors every year. Notable temples include 900+ year old Idol of Shree Lakshmikant Bhagwan in Shree Lakshmikant Mandir (Brahmin Gali), Ambe mata Mandir, Jagnath Mahadev Mandir the 200-year-old Radhakrishna temple, Manchapuran Hanuman temple, Jagnath Mahadev, Bada Mandir (Jain Temple), and Jain Dadawadi (Shree Rajendrasurishwar ji maharasaheb), Rogyadevi mandir, Sujalpur mandir.

== Educational institutes ==
As of the 2011 Census of India, Jaora had 119 primary schools, 38 middle schools, 9 secondary schools and 11 senior secondary schools as well as 2 science colleges and 1 polytechnic college.

== Transport ==
Jaora has a railway station on the Indian Railways network between Ratlam - Ajmer section. From Jaora there are direct trains for Ajmer, Chittorgarh, Udaipur, Agra, Kota, Indore, Bhopal, Jodhpur, Jaipur, Ujjain, Ratlam, Mandsaur, Neemuch, Mumbai, Vadodara, Ahmedabad.

The Mhow - Neemuch state highway passes through Jaora. Jaora is 38 km from district HQ Ratlam. Buses provide access to the surrounding area.

== Nawabs of Jaora ==
- 1817-1825 Iftikhar ud-Daula, Nawab Abdul Ghafur'Khan Bahadur, Diler-Jung
- 1825-1827 Musharraf Begum (f)+ Jahangir Khan -Regent (d. 1827)
- 1827-1840 Borthwick -Regent
- 1825-1865 Muhtasim ud-Daula, Nawab Ghaus Muhammad'Khan Bahadur, Shaukat-Jung
- 1865-1872 Sahibzada Hazrat Nur Khan-Regent
- 1865-1895 Ihtisham ud-Daula, Nawab Muhammad Ismail'Khan Bahadur, Firoz-Jung
- 1895-1906 Sahibzada Yar Muhammad Khan -Regent
- 1895-1947 Fakhr ud-Daula, Nawab Iftikhar Ali'Khan Bahadur, Saulat-Jung
- 1947-1972 Asif ud-Daula, Nawab Usman Ali'Khan Bahadur, Saulat-Jung. Unmarried

== Notable people ==
- Kailash Nath Katju - former CM of Madhya Pradesh
- Abdul Halim Jaffer Khan - Indian classical musician and sitar player awarded Padma Bhushan
- Laxminarayan Pandey - former Member of parliament Mandsour (Lok Sabha constituency)

== See also ==
- Ratlam
- Malwa
