= Amitabh Bachchan Sports Complex =

Sports venue in Uttar Pradesh, India

- Interactive map of Amitabh Bachchan Sports Complex
- Address: India
- Location: Allahabad, Uttar Pradesh
- Coordinates: 25.4599267°N 81.842595°E
- Owner: Government of Uttar Pradesh
- Operator: Government of Uttar Pradesh
- Capacity: 4,000
- Field size: 60 m (200 ft) radius

Construction
- Opened: 2006

Amitabh Bachchan Sports Complex is an indoor arena located in Allahabad (Prayagraj), Uttar Pradesh. The 4,000-seat stadium is only indoor stadium in city and was named after famous Indian actor Amitabh Bachchan who was born in the city. It is owned and managed by UP Sports Directorate. The stadium has facilities for games like basketball.

== See also ==
- Babu Banarasi Das Indoor Stadium
- Master Chandgiram Sports Stadium
- Madan Mohan Malaviya Stadium
- Dr Sampurnanand Sports Stadium
