= Allahabad Cricketers =

Indian cricket club

Allahabad Cricketers (इलाहाबाद क्रिकेटर्स) was founded as a cricket club in 1985 at Madan Mohan Malviya Stadium in Prayagraj for young cricketers. Its first coach and manager was Ramesh Pal. He appointed Alok Ranjan Singh as the club's first full-time captain.

== Famous players ==
The players like Ashish Zaidi, Gyanendra Pandey, Obaid Kamal, Mohammad Saif, Mohammad Kaif, Jyoti Yadav have grown while playing for this club. The main practice ground for this club has been Madan Mohan Malviya Stadium in the historical Alfred Park of Allahabad.

One of its prodigies, Rambabu Pal who was in under-16 India camp along with Sachin Tendulkar and Vinod Kambli, committed suicide at the age of 34.

Allahabad crickters has produced several cricketers for Under-19 and University of Allahabad cricket team. L.B. Kala, Ramesh Pal, Brijesh Sahay, B.N. Agrwal, Arun Singh, Ravindra Singh, Vinod Pandey, Alok Singh, Mohammad Asif, Nouman Fazal and many others went on to play for the university team. Brijesh Sahay, B.N. Agrwal and Alok Singh also played regularly for famous Subhania Club in DDCA's A-Division league and other tournaments in Delhi.

Allahabad Cricketers has had several senior players from the Ranji trophy teams of Uttar Pradesh and Railways right from the beginning. Veteran players like Hyder Ali have guided players for many years.

== Coaches ==
Several coaches from Allahabad Crickters were trained at National Institute of Sports (NIS) and Sports Authority of India.

MP Singh who worked as the Cricket Coach of University of Allahabad, after graduating from National Institute of Sports (NIS) contributed to talent development and coaching set-up in Allahabad. Later MP Singh moved to Delhi to assist Dronacharya awardee Gurcharan Singh at National Stadium Cricket Center. There he developed several national and international players.
