= Korrah Sadat =

Korrah Sadat Chak Korrah Sadat
- Town
- Location in Uttar Pradesh, India Korrah Sadat (India)
- Coordinates: 25.8181°N 80.9417°E
- Country: India
- State: Uttar Pradesh
- District: Fatehpur

Languages
  - Official: Hindi
- Time zone: UTC+5:30 (IST)
- PIN: 212622

Korrah Sadat / Chak Kori Sadad / Chak Korra Sadat is a village in Allahabad Mandal, Fatehpur district, in the state of Uttar Pradesh, India.

== Geography ==
Korra Sadat is 20 km from its district main city Fatehpur and 140 km from its state main city Lucknow. The national highway ( g.t. road) is 5 km from village. Delhi- Kolkata railway line is 4 km from the village. Its PIN is 212622.

== Religion ==
There is a temple of KALI MATA which is more than 150 years old. There is a Neem tree in this temple which is very large.

One part of village is majority Hindu and another part is majority Muslim. The Village is covered with sub boundaries of Ahiran Ka Purva, Buchhi Ka Purva, Dalpatpur and Kumharan Ka Purva. These are the sub part of the village. The Hindu community used to celebrate the festival like Holi and Deewali with full Panoply while Muslims celebrate their Eid Festival with meeting each other. In the time of Navratri Hindu community establish the sculpture of Durga Mata and celebrate the festival up to 9 days. Every night Durga Jagaran program take place and thereafter villagers Immerse the Sculpture in the Ganges river. Muslims also celebrate the Program of "Qawwali" (a style of Sufi devotional music marked by rhythmic improvisatory repetition of a short phrase) every year with full Panoply.

== Economy ==
Farming is the main occupation of the village and it is the main source of the living and income. People of the village are also working as government employee and living outside the village.

== Sport ==
Cricket is one of the game of the village and tournaments used to take place in the village often. There are 3-4 cricket teams in the village.
