= Allahpur =

- Town
- Location in Uttar Pradesh, India
- Coordinates: 25°27′19″N 81°52′18″E
- Country: India
- State: Uttar Pradesh
- District: Prayagraj

Area
  - Total: 2 km^{2} (0.77 sq mi)

Languages
  - Official: Hindi
- Time zone: UTC+5:30 (IST)
- PIN: 211006
- Nearest city: Prayag Raj
- Lok Sabha constituency: Allahabad North
- Vidhan Sabha constituency: Allahabad North

Allahpur, Officially Bharadwaj Puram is a locality (township) of Prayagraj, Uttar Pradesh, India.

Allahpur is a township/mohalla of Prayagraj district. It falls under the Phulpur constituency of Uttar Pradhesh's legislative assembly. It is located at a very strategic point in Prayagraj with proximity to tourist attractions like Triveni Sangam (a confluence of the Ganges), the Yamuna, and the mythical Sarasvati River, Bharadwaj Park and Anand Bhavan.
