= Indira Marathon =

Road running event in Prayagraj, India

- Date: 19 November
- Location: Prayagraj, India
- Event type: Road
- Distance: 42.195 KM
- Established: 1975
- Website: indiramarathon.com

The Indira Marathon is a national annual full marathon held in Prayagraj, India. It commemorates the birth anniversary of India's former prime minister, Indira Gandhi. The race starts from Anand Bhawan, the ancestral home of the Nehru-Gandhi family.It was started in 1975 by Mr.Nirmal Singh Saini who was posted as Regional Sports Officer in Sports Stadium of Allahabad.The initiative of Mr.Saini was appreciated by then Sports Director Mr.K.D.Singh Babu who was Director, Sports Department, Uttar Pradesh and Mr.Bhure Lal was the District Magistrate during that period.This marathon started to spread awareness about physical fitness among the citizens of the city.The marathon was open to all citizens.The distance for the race is twenty six miles. Since 1975, this marathon is still run on 19 November every year to commemorate the Birth Anniversary of Late Prime Minister Indira Gandhi.
