= Motilal Nehru Medical College =

Medical school in Prayagraj, Uttar Pradesh, India

Moti Lal Nehru Medical College
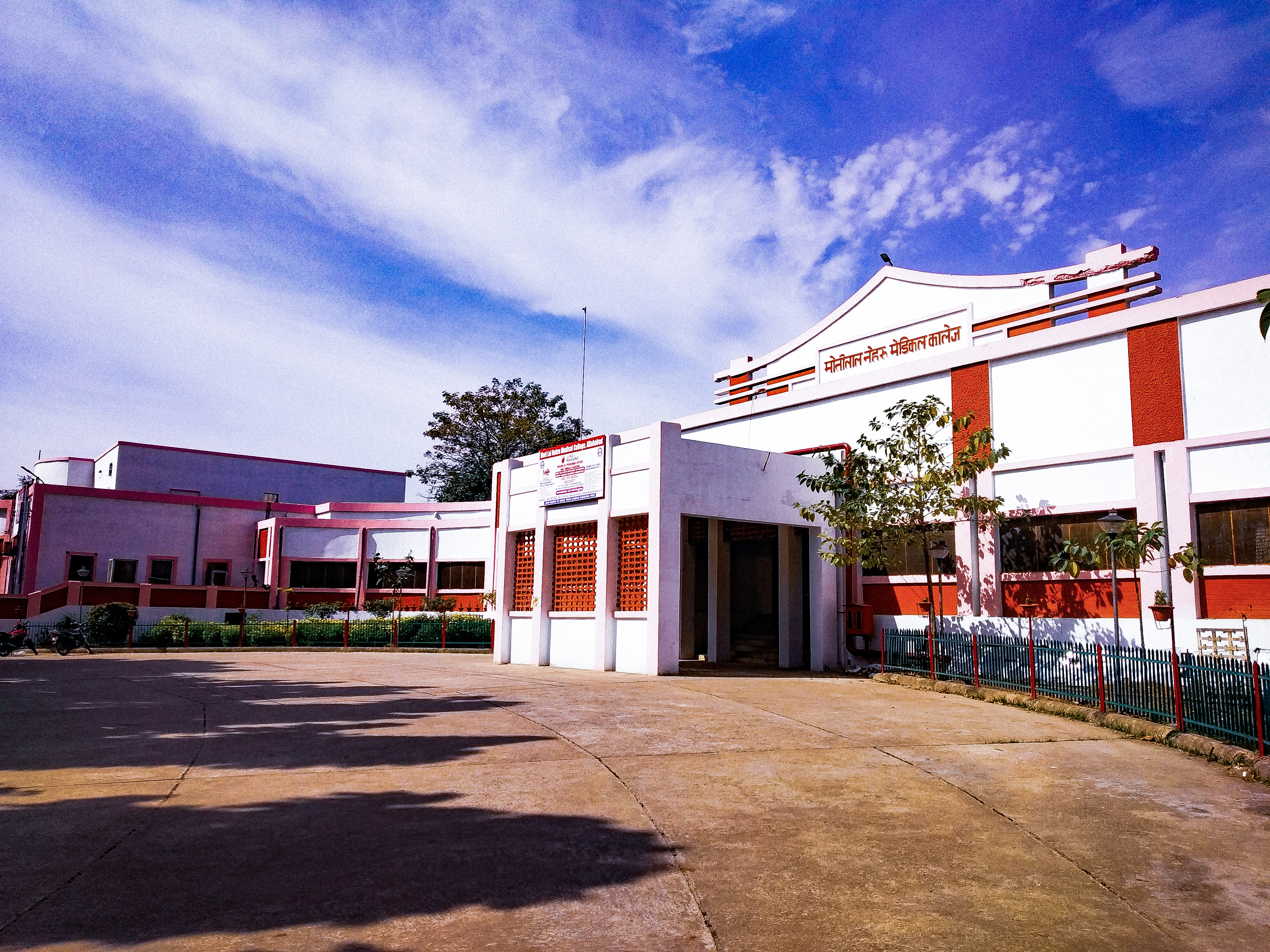
- Administrative building
- Motto in English: "Service is the supreme dharma”
- Type: Medical College and Public Hospital
- Established: 5 May 1961; 65 years ago
- Academic affiliations: Atal Bihari Vajpayee Medical University
- Principal: Dr. V. K. Pandey
- Location: George Town, Prayagraj, Uttar Pradesh – 284128, India, Prayagraj, Uttar Pradesh, India; 25°27′1.1″N 81°51′6.7″E
- Campus: Urban
- Website: https://mlnmc.edu.in/

Moti Lal Nehru Medical College (MLNMC) is a government medical college and hospital in Prayagraj, Uttar Pradesh, India. It was founded in memory of Motilal Nehru, who was the father of Jawaharlal Nehru. It is affiliated to Atal Bihari Vajpayee Medical University.

== History and formation ==
On 7 November 1854, Leslie Hudson, a member of British Parliament raised a question about British Government's plan to open medical colleges in India which was under the rule of British East India Company then. Replying to that, Sir Charles Wood, the minister concerned announced that by 1861 medical colleges would be opened in five cities of India, namely Bombay, Calcutta, Madras, Lahore and Allahabad. Pt. Motilal Nehru was the chief spokesperson of the deputation that called on Lord Curzon, the then Viceroy of India, on 17 November 1904 at Allahabad in leadership of Pt. Madan Mohan Malviya. During this meet, Pt. Motilal Nehru reminded the Viceroy of the promise made by the British Government 50 years back and told him that it was a matter of deep regret that there was no medical college in Allahabad, which at that time was the capital of the United Province.

Moti Lal Nehru Medical College was formally inaugurated on 5 May 1961 by the President of India, Dr. Rajendra Prasad, just one day prior to Nehru's 100th birthday, and a century after the proposed time by the British Govt. Initially the premises of the British District Jail at South Malaka were acquired for the college. Pt. Motilal Nehru was kept imprisoned there in 1930 during British rule for his leading role in the freedom movement and released only after severe illness, which resulted in his death on 6 February 1931. Later, in 1963, the Government House, which used to be residence of the Governor of United Province, was acquired for the college while the jail premises were transformed into Swaroop Rani Nehru Hospital (named after Pt. Motilal Nehru's wife).

== Academics ==
The college offers MBBS, MD, MS, PG Diploma and DM courses.

The intake for MBBS course is 200 per year.

== Upgradation ==
The Government of India decided to upgrade the institute on lines of All India Institute of Medical Sciences as part of phase-3 of Pradhan Mantri Swasthya Suraksha Yojana (PMSSY) whereby the Central Government bore 80% of the cost of upgradation and 20% cost was borne by State Government. As part of the upgradation, a Super-Speciality block having 233 beds was built.

== Famous Alumni ==
1. Dr Ajay Khanna - Transplant surgeon, U.S.A.

2. Dr Sanjay Pratap Singh - World famous Neurologist. Chief Physician of Allina Health, U.S.A.

3. Dr Sumita Deodhar - Pathologist, Brown University, U.S.A.
