= Madan Mohan Malaviya Stadium =

Stadium in Allahabad, India

Coordinates: 25.4523°N 81.8477°E

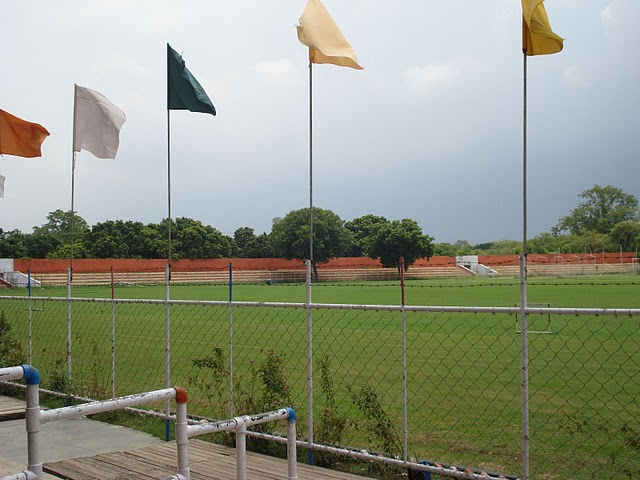
- Interactive map of Madan Mohan Malaviya Stadium
- Location: Prayagraj
- Country: India
- Owner: Uttar Pradesh Government

Madan Mohan Malaviya Stadium is a stadium in Prayagraj, India. It is used by Uttar Pradesh cricket team for their domestic matches. The venue is used for Cricket, Hockey, Javelin throw, Taekwondo, and Judo.

It is named after the famous Indian freedom fighter "Madan Mohan Malaviya". The stadium was formerly known as Alfred Park.

== See also ==
- List of tourist attractions in Prayagraj
