= Timeline of Prayagraj =

This is a timeline of the history of the city of Prayagraj, Uttar Pradesh, India.

== 7th century BCE ==
c. 600
- Excavations have revealed Northern Black Polished Ware dating to Indian Iron Age.

== 4th century BCE ==
312
- A strong fortification at Prayaga was recorded by Seleucus I Nicator at the junction of Ganga and Yamuna river.

== 3rd century BCE ==
250
- A sculptured monument (Pillars of Ashoka) was erected in Prayaga by Ashoka the Great for inscribing his edicts.

== 3rd century CE ==
240
- Early Guptas under Sri Gupta fanned out from Prayag.

== 4th century CE ==
350
- In the Prayag Prasasti, Sri Gupta and Ghatotkacha are given the title of Mahārāja while Chandragupta I and Samudragupta are referred to as Mahārājādhirāja.

== 5th century CE ==
455
- Prayag remains imperial capital until the reign of Kumaragupta I, later in about 455 CE, emperor Skandagupta shifted the center of power to Ayodhya.

== 7th century CE ==
612
- Harsha's official coronation and a religious conference took place in the city.
644

The Chinese traveler Xuanzang (Hiuen Tsang) described a ritual organized by Emperor Shiladitya (identified with Harsha) at the confluence of two rivers, in the kingdom of Po-lo-ye-kia (identified with Prayaga). He also mentions that many hundreds took a bath at the confluence, to wash away their sins. According to some scholars, this is earliest surviving historical account of the Prayaga Kumbh Mela, which took place in Prayaga in 644 CE. However, Xuanzang's reference is about an event that happened every 5 years (and not 12 years), and might have been a Buddhist celebration (since Harsha was a Buddhist emperor).

== 10th century CE ==
916
- Pratihara Empire including Prayaga and Kannauj was captured and plundered by Indra III under the reign of Mahipala I.

== 12th century CE ==
1194
- The city was invaded by Shihab ad-Din, the sultan of Ghurid Empire.

== 14th century CE ==
c. 1300 – c. 1400
- City went under the Khalji dynasty, ruled by Alauddin Khalji.

== 16th century CE ==
c. 1575 – c. 1583
- Akbarnama mentions that the Mughal emperor Akbar founded a great city in Prayag. `Abd al-Qadir Bada'uni and Nizamuddin Ahmad mention that Akbar laid the foundations of an Imperial City at Prayag which he called Ilahabas.
c. 1575 – c. 1583

The Allahabad Fort was built by Mughal Emperor Akbar at Prayag. He had been impressed with its strategic position, as it sat on the confluence of Ganga and Yamuna, with the fort allowing for any movement along both.

c. 1574 – c. 1584
- Per Abu'l Fazal, Akbar laid the foundations of a city called Ilahabas at the town of Prayag on 13 November 1583.
- Per `Abd al-Qadir Bada'uni, the date of its founding as 14 June 1574.
- Nizamuddin Ahmad mentions two different dates, one as 13 July 1574. He also mentioned Akbar laying the foundation in the section about occurrences in the year 1584.
1580
- Akbar divides his empire into 12 subahs based on names of the country or their capital. The "Subah of Ilahabas" is created.

== 17th century CE ==
c. 1602 – c. 1604
- Prince Salim seizes its treasury and establishes himself as a virtually independent ruler. In May 1602, Salim had his name read in Friday prayers and his name minted on coins in Illahabas. Akbar reconciled with Salim and the latter returned to the royal court in 1604.
c. 1622
- Prince Khusrau died that year. After his death his father Jahangir built his mausoleum in the city along with his mother and sister at Khusro Bagh.

== 18th century CE ==
1721
- Muhammad Khan Bangash of the Mughal Empire became the subahdar (governor) of Illahabas Province.
1735
- City fell into the hands of Maratha Empire until 1750.
1750
- Pathans of Farrukhabad sacked the city.
1753
- Safdarjung, the Nawab of Awadh seized the city and held it until 1765.
1765
- 12 August: Treaty of Allahabad was signed. The Treaty marks the political and constitutional involvement and the beginning of Company rule in India.

== 19th century CE ==
1801
- Annexation of the city by the British East India Company (beginning the Company rule).
1803
- The 17th century Jade Terrapin was found at the bottom of a well during engineering excavations. It was bequeathed it to the British Museum in 1830.
1821
- Population: 20,000.
1833
- The city became the seat of Ceded and Conquered Provinces before the capital was shifted to Agra in 1835.
1839
- Holy Trinity Church, the first church in the city, was established.
1856
- Rail transport was introduced to the city; the first railway line between Calcutta and Prayagraj was completed.
1857
- Prayagraj was a participant in the Rebellion of 1857. The city, with a number of European troops, was the scene of a massacre.
- Civil Lines was built; it was the largest town-planning project carried out in India before the establishment of New Delhi.
1858
- Earl Canning, at Minto Park, read out the declaration of Queen Victoria's Proclamation which resulted in the complete transfer of control over India from The East India Company to the government of Britain (beginning the British Rule).
- The city became the seat of North-Western Provinces.
- It became the capital of India.
1859
- 3 March: First passenger train in North India ran between Prayagraj and Kanpur.
1861
- Population: 105,900.
1863
- Prayagraj Municipal Corporation established as the Municipal Board of Prayagraj.
1864
- Allahabad Public Library was established.
1865
- The Pioneer made its first appearance.
- 15 August: Construction of the Old Naini Bridge was completed.
- Allahabad Bank was established.
1866
- 25 November: The Allahabad High Court was inaugurated. Though it sat in Agra till 1868.
1869
- The High Court was moved back to Prayagraj from Agra.
1870
- The building of Allahabad Public Library was built.
- State Police Headquarters established in the city.
- Chandrashekhar Azad Park was built.
1871
- 10 April: Foundation stone of All Saints Cathedral was laid.
- Population: 143,700.
1877
- A. H. Wheeler was founded.
1879
- St. Joseph's Cathedral was built.
- Mayo Memorial Hall was built.
1881
- Population: 148,500.
1887
- 23 September: University of Allahabad, the fourth oldest University in India, was established.
1888
- The fourth conference of the Indian National Congress addressed in the city by George Yule.
1891
- Population: 175,200.
1892
- The eighth conference of the Indian National Congress addressed in the city by Womesh Chunder Bonnerjee.
1896
- The city was hit by the Famine of 1896. A considerable effect was seen in the decrease of the city population during the Census of 1901.
1899
- The fifteenth conference of the Indian National Congress addressed in the city by Romesh Chunder Dutt.

== 20th century ==
1901
- Population: 172,000.
1902
- The city became the capital of United Provinces till 1920.
- Curzon Bridge was built; it linked the city, through rail road, to the northern regions of the state
- Ewing Christian College was established.
1909
- 24 October: The Leader was first published. It circulated until 1967.
1910
- Sam Higginbottom University of Agriculture, Technology and Sciences was established.
1911
- 18 February: Henri Pequet carried the world's first official airmail from Prayagraj to Naini.
1913
- Prayagraj Clock Tower was built in Chowk, Prayagraj.
1914
- D.A.V College was established.
1919
- Prayagraj Airport was built, it served as an international airport till 1946.
1921
- Population: 157,200.
1926
- Prayag Sangeet Samiti was established.
1930
- 11 April: Salt March carried out by Jawaharlal Nehru.
- Allahabad Address was made by Muhammad Iqbal.
1931
- 27 February: Chandrashekhar Azad died at Alfred Park.
- Allahabad Museum was established.
- Population: 183,900.
1941
- Population: 260,600.
1942
- Prayag Kumbh Mela banned by the British Government due to fears of Japanese bombing the nearby situated Akbar Fort during the World War II
1951
- Population: 332,300.
1954
- First incident of Kumbh Mela stampede occurred.
1961
- Population: 412,000.
1971
- Population: 513,000.
1980
- Jawahar Planetarium was built.
1981
- Population: 642,200.
1985
- First Indira Marathon was conducted.
1991
- Population: 792,900.
1999
- Indian Institute of Information Technology, Allahabad was established.

== 21st century ==
2001
- Population: 990,298.
2004
- New Yamuna Bridge was completed.
2011
- Population: 1,117,094.
2013
- 10 February: An estimated 30 million people gathered in the city to bathe on Mauni Amavasya during Kumbh Mela.
- Second incident of Kumbh Mela stampede occurred.
2015
- 25 January: MoU signed between the United States Trade and Development Agency and the Government of Uttar Pradesh for developing the city as a smart city.
- 23 June: Civil Lines Bus Depot became the first public spot in the city to be equipped with free Wi-Fi.
2016
- 23 April: Completion of renovation and inauguration of Chandrashekhar Azad Park.
2017
- 22 April: On Earth Day, the Allahabad Museum, using solar power system, became the first museum in the country to become self-reliant in power generation.
2018
- October: Yogi Adityanath-led government officially changed the name of the city to Prayagraj.
2020
- 24 March: City, along with the nation, was put under lockdown due to COVID-19 pandemic.

== See also ==
- History of Prayagraj
- Prayagraj Smart City Project
- Akshayavata
