= History of Prayagraj =

Prayagraj, also known as Ilahabad or Allahabad in an anglicized version in Roman script, and anciently Prayag, is a city situated on an inland peninsula, surrounded by the rivers Ganges and Yamuna on three sides, with only one side connected to the mainland Doab region, of which it is a part.

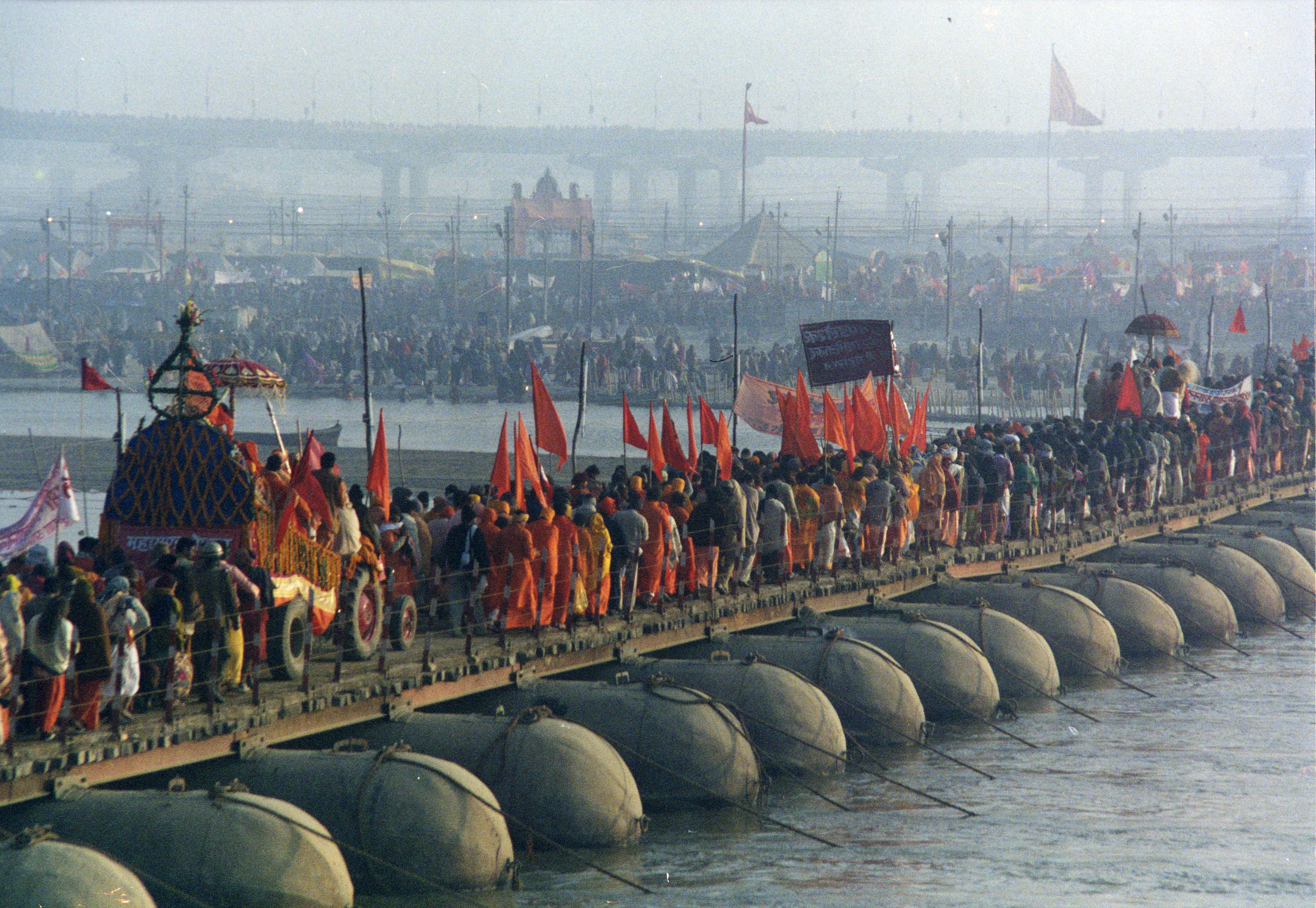
A procession of Akharas march over the Ganges River during the Kumbh Mela at Prayagraj in 2001.

This position is of importance in Hindu scriptures for it is situated at the confluence, known as Triveni Sangam, of the holy rivers. As per Rigveda the Sarasvati River (now dried up but believed to be flowing under the river Ganges) was part of the three river confluence in ancient times. It is one of four sites of the Kumbh Mela, an important mass Hindu pilgrimage.

== History ==
=== Archaeological Findings ===
Excavations have revealed Iron Age of Northern Black Polished Ware in present-day Prayagraj. Archaeological sites in India, such as Kosambi and Jhusi near Prayagraj in present-day Uttar Pradesh show iron implements in the period 1800–1200 BC. When this area in the North Western part of India was first settled, Prayag was part of the territory of the Kuru tribe, although most of Doab was not settled and consisted of dense forests at that time.

=== Ancient Times ===
The Doab region, including Prayaga, was controlled by several empires and dynasties in the ages to come. It became a part of the Mauryan and Gupta empires of the east and the Kushan empire of the west before becoming part of the Kannauj empire. Objects unearthed in Prayaga (now Prayagraj) indicate that it was part of the Kushana empire in the 1st century AD. According to Rajtarangini of Kalhana, in 780 CE, Prayag was also an important part of the kingdom of Karkota king of Kashmir, Jayapida. Jayapida constructed a monument at Prayag, which existed at Kalhana's time.

In his memoirs on India, Huien Tsang, the Chinese Buddhist monk and chronicler who travelled through India during Harshavardhana's reign (A.D. 607–647), writes that he visited Prayaga in A.D. 643.

=== Gupta Empire ===
==== homeland ====
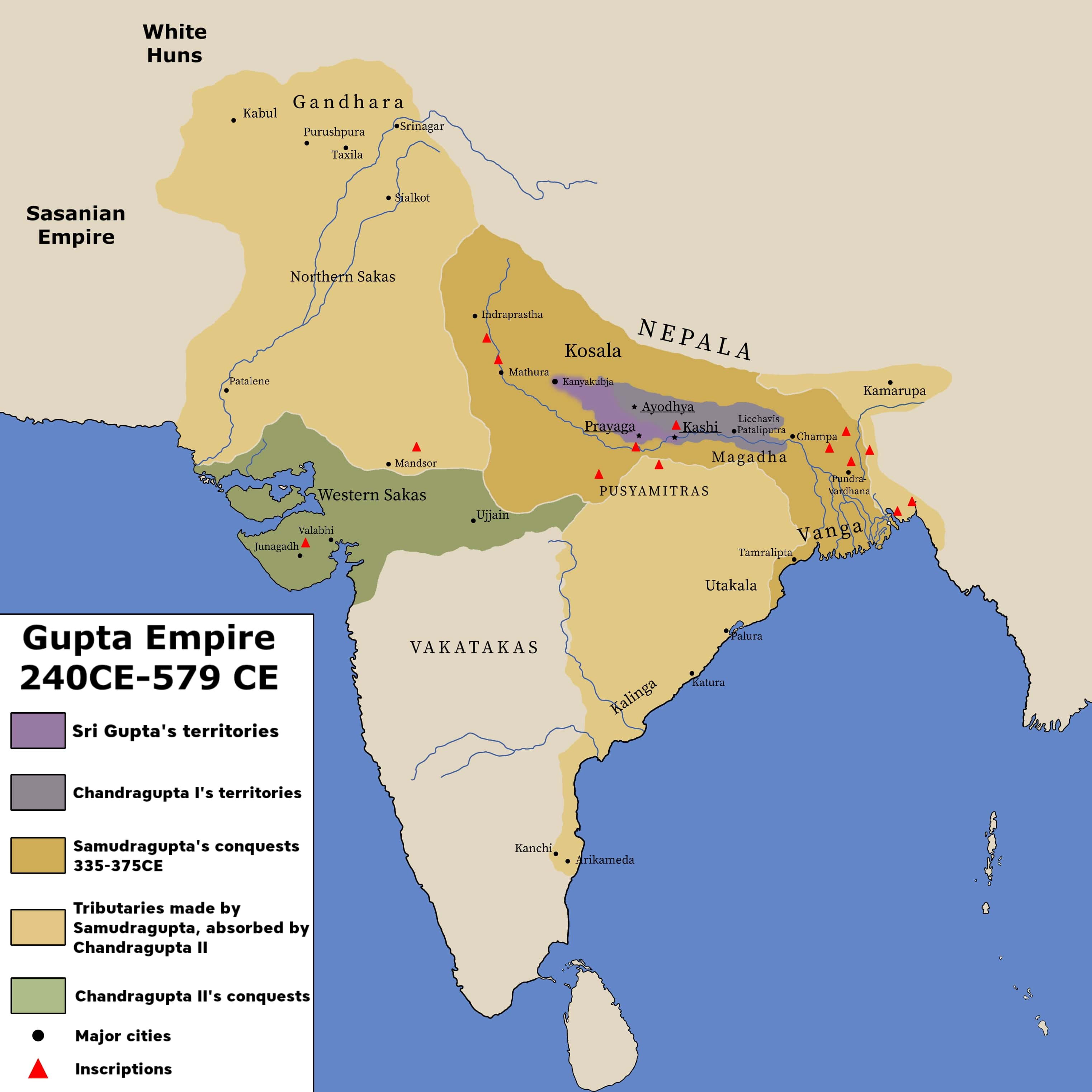
Evolution of Gupta territory, with neighbouring polities.

In some recent academic studies, the Guptas are traced to have originated from the Prayaga region, where they first established power. Goyal suggests that the Allahabad Pillar Inscription strongly indicates that the early Gupta center of power was in the modern eastern Uttar Pradesh, probably around Prayaga.

The Vishnu Purana provides an intriguing reference: "Anu-Ganga Prayāgam Māgadha Guptās-cha bhokshyanti," which has been translated by Majumdar as "The territory along the Ganges (up to) Prayaga will be enjoyed by the people of Magadha and the Guptas." This excerpt suggests that the Guptas were distinguished from the people of Magadha, yet both jointly ruled the region along the Ganges up to Prayaga.

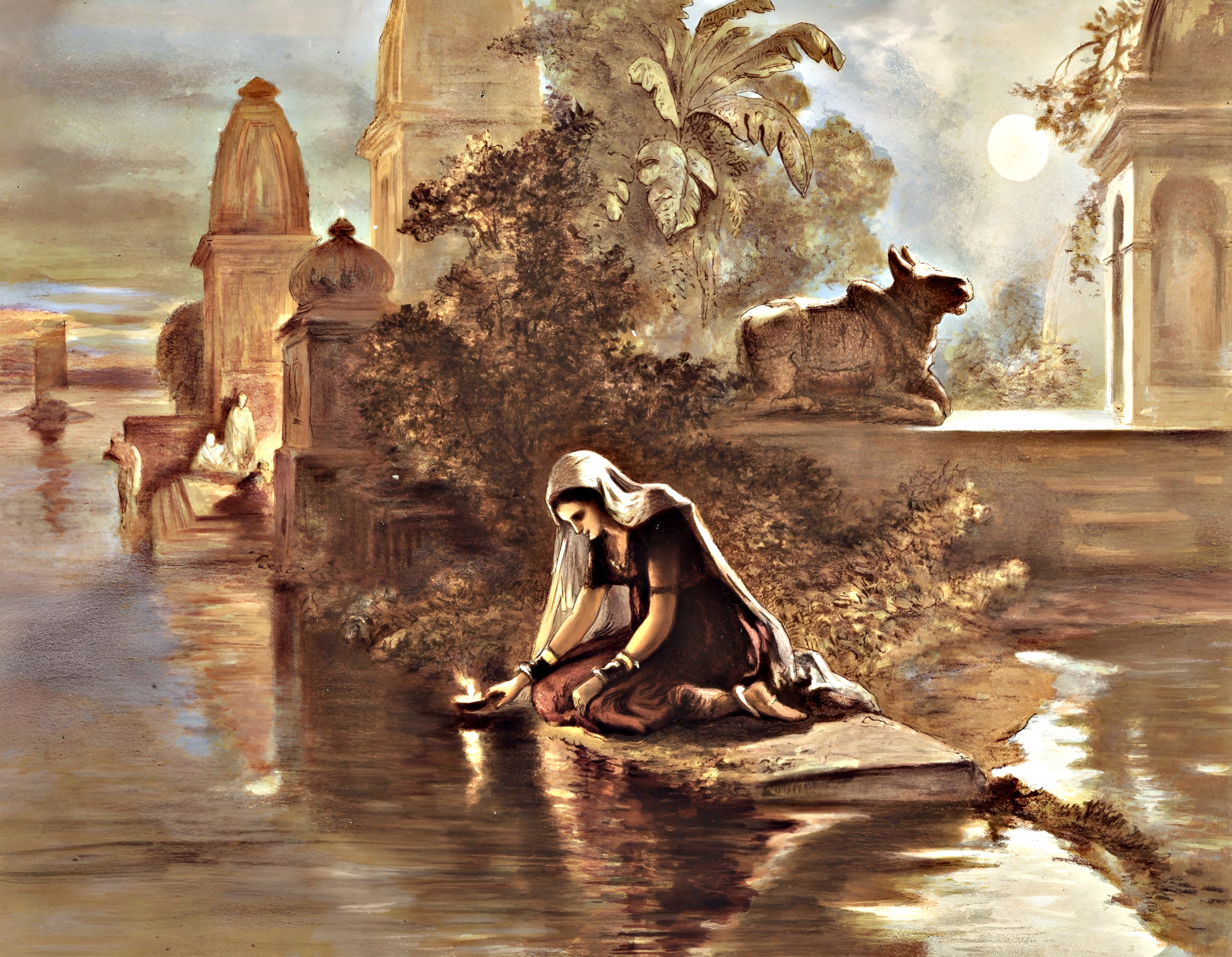
Indian woman floating lamps on the Ganges by William Simpson.

Historically, the Gupta Empire emerged from the unification of the Gupta and Licchavis states, which aligns with this Purana's reference. The text seems to imply that the Licchavis of Nepal were identified with the Magadhas, and their joint domain included Magadha and the territory stretching westward to Prayag.

In this context, the capital of the Gupta empire likely started around Magadha and Prayag and expanded from there. The concentration of early Gupta inscriptions and gold coinages around Prayag (especially of Samudragupta's famous prasasti) tends to suggest that this region was the residence of greatest power of the Guptas. They probably controlled Sarnath in the east, and as their stronghold, they used Prayag. For the initial phase of the empire, the exact boundaries in the region above and the west is vague, but they most definitely controlled eastern Uttar Pradesh. By the late third and early fourth centuries, this area had burgeoned into a dynasty aiming to build a great empire.

==== Imperial capital ====
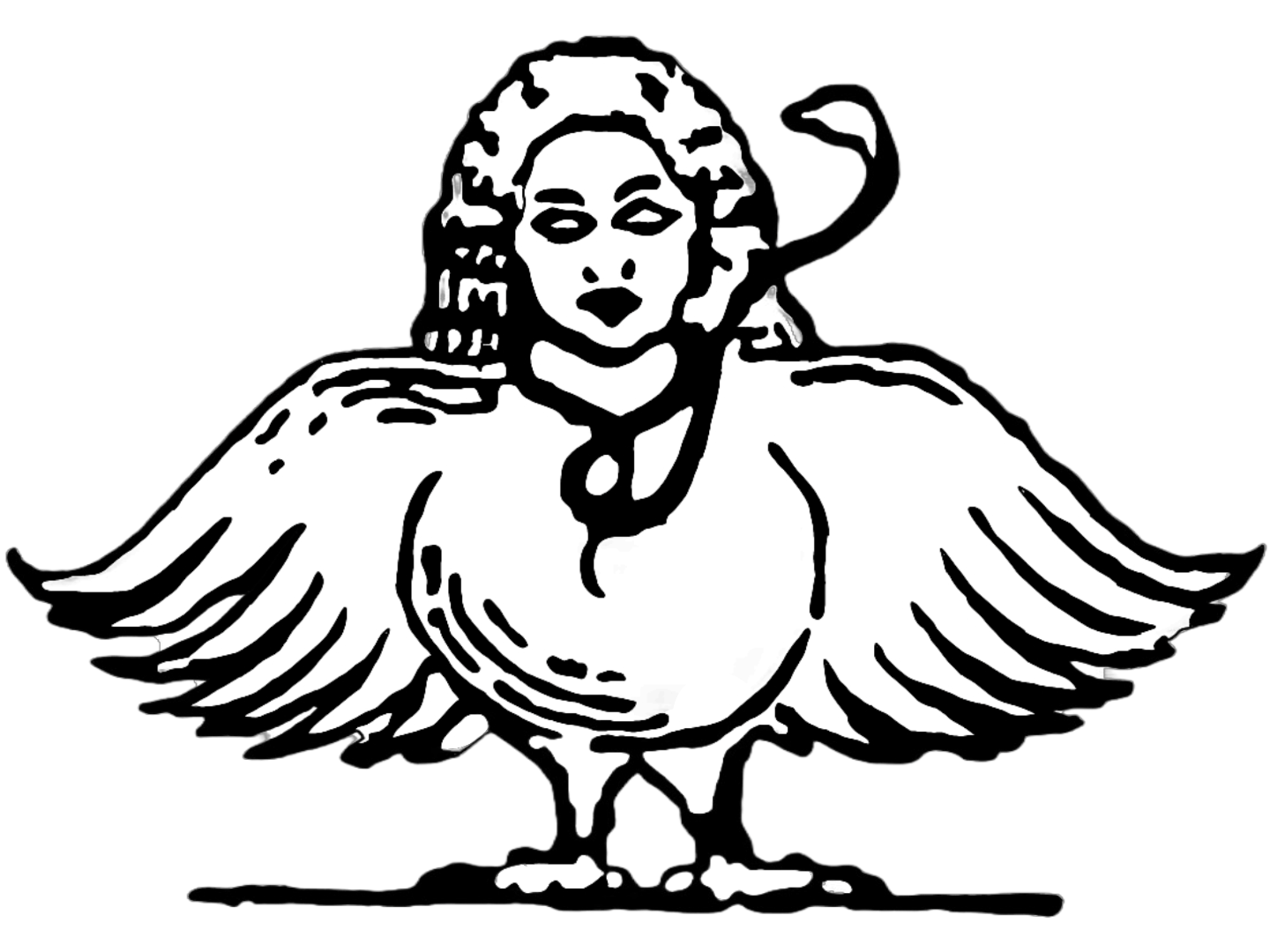
Garuda emblem of the Gupta Empire.

Various scholars consider Prayaga as the initial Gupta capital and supports this arguments with The Puranic references, and multiple early Gupta era inscriptions alongside the discovery of numerous coin hoards scattered around the region, further suggesting that the Guptas strengthened their sovereignty over the area prior to further expansion.

This statement was also supported by R.S. Sharma who claimed that it is highly likely the Guptas based themselves in Uttar Pradesh because from there they could expand anywhere. With Prayag as their center, they extended their rule over Anuganga (mid-Gangetic basin), Prayag (modern Prayagraj), Saketa (modern Ayodhya), and Magadha.

==== Prayaga Prasasti ====
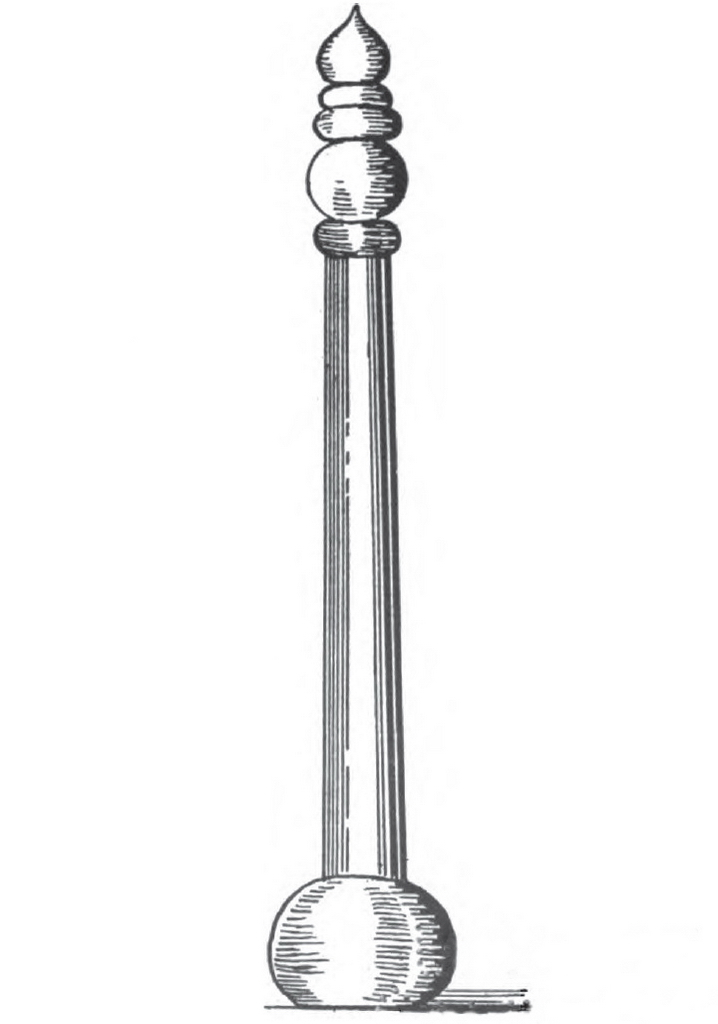
The Allahabad Pillar as seen by the missionary Joseph Tiefenthaler in the 18th century.

Samudragupta is thought to have come to the throne in the mid-4th century CE. His precise date of coronation is not known, however, evidence from both numismatics and epigraphy bear witness that he was one of the greatest rulers of ancient India. He was an excellent statesman, a gifted poet, and a musician. As noted in the Allahabad Pillar inscription, he was also a great conqueror who unified north and central India.

In the same inscription, Sri Gupta and Ghatotkacha are given the title of Mahārāja while Chandragupta I and Samudragupta are referred to as Mahārājādhirāja, reflecting the increasing power and imperial glory of the dynasty.

=== Muslim rule ===
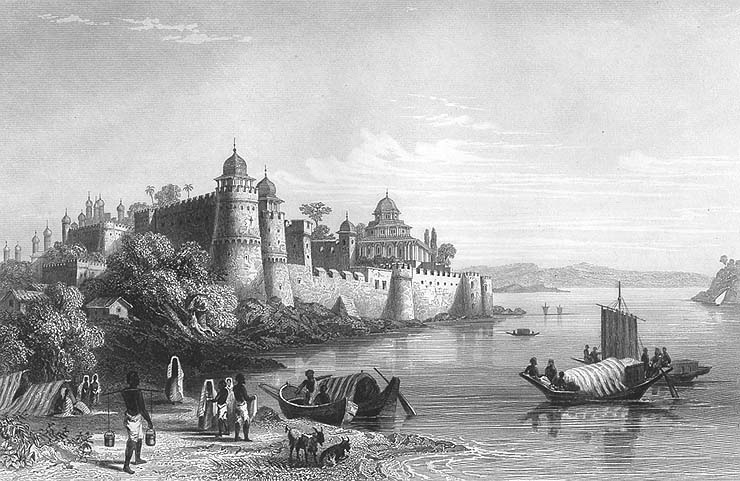
Allahabad Fort built by Akbar in 1575

In contrast to the account of Xuanzang, the Muslim historians mention the tree to be located at the confluence of the rivers. The historian Dr. D. B. Dubey states that it appears that between this period, the sandy plain was washed away by the Ganga, to an extent that the temple and tree seen by the Chinese traveller too was washed away, with the river later changing its course to the east and the confluence shifting to the place where Akbar laid the foundations of his fort.

As the majority of the houses would have been mud-walled, a flood could easily destroy them. Sir Alexander Cunningham, founder of the Archaeological Survey of India, concluded as much in his reports published in 1875 on the Archaeological Survey of India, supporting that assumption: "I infer that during the long period that intervened between the time of Hiuen Tsang and that of Akbar, the two rivers gradually carried away the whole of the sandy plain. Long before this time, the old city had, no doubt, been deserted, for we know that the fort of Allahabad was founded on its site." However, present day Cambridge archaeologist Dilip Kumar Chakrabarti disagrees. He argues that there is no way modern Prayag is ancient, but that the city site of Jhusi located opposite of the confluence was the ancient settlement of Prayag.

The early 19th-century historian Sir Henry Miers Elliot believed that a town existed before Allahabad was founded. He adds that after Mahmud of Ghazni captured Asní near Fatehpur, he would not have crossed into Bundelkhand without visiting Allahabad, had there been a city there worth plundering. He further argues that its capture would have been heard about when Muhammad of Ghor captured Benares. However, Ghori's historians never took notice of it. Yet the Akbarnama mentions that the Mughal emperor Akbar founded a great city in Prayag. `Abd al-Qadir Bada'uni and Nizamuddin Ahmad mention that Akbar laid the foundations of an Imperial City at Prayag which he called Ilahabas.

==== Mughal Rule ====
Akbar's fort was built between 1574 and 1583. The Akbarnama states that, "For a long time [Akbar's] desire was to found a great city in the town of Prayag, where the rivers Ganges and Jamna join, which is regarded by the people of India with great reverence and which is a place of pilgrimage for ascetics of that country, and to build a choice fort there." He had been impressed with its strategic position, as it sat on the confluence of Ganga and Yamuna, with the fort allowing for any movement along both. Other writers also attribute it to the facilitate the collection of pilgrimage tax from those visiting Triveni Sangam, though this appears unlikely as he had already abolished it in 1563.

It is said that Akbar was so impressed by its strategic site after visiting it in 1575 that he ordered that a fort be constructed and renamed it Illahabas or Abode of God by 1584, later changed to Allahabad under Shah Jahan. Speculations regarding its name however exist. Because of the surrounding people calling it Alhabas, has led to some people holding the view that it was named after Alha from Alha's story and was renamed by Akbar in the interest of Islam. James Forbes' account of early 1800s claims that it was renamed Allahabad or abode of God by Jahangir after he failed to destroy the Akshayavat tree. The name, however, predates him, with Ilahabas and Ilahabad mentioned on coins minted in the city since Akbar's rule, the latter name became predominant after the emperor's death. It has also been thought to not have been named after Allah but ilaha (the gods). Shaligram Shrivastav claimed in Prayag Pradip that the name was deliberately given by Akbar to be construed as both Hindu ("ilaha") and Muslim ("Allah").

==== Subah of Illahabad ====
In 1580, Akbar reorganized his empire into 12 divisions, per Ain-i-Akbari, "to each of which he gave the name Subah and distinguished them by the appellation of the tract of country or its capital city." He combined the provinces of Jaunpur Sultanate, Kara-Manikpur and territory of Bandhogarh into the Subah of Ilahabas. He had been worried about the administration of the area, particularly after Ali Quli Khan Zaman's rebellion. Allahabad was selected as its capital. The Subah of Allahabad was subdvided into the sarkars of: Allahabad, Benares, Jaunpur, Chanadah, Ghazipur, Karrah, Korah, Kalinjar and Manikpur. Akbar deputed his son Salim (the future emperor Jahangir) to carry on the war against Mewar while leaving to campaign in Deccan. The latter, however, tried to seize Agra's treasury in mid-1600 and came here after his failure. Upon reaching Allahabad, he seized its treasury and set himself up as a virtually independent ruler while raising an army. In May 1602, Salim had his name read in Friday prayers and his name minted on coins in Allahabad. Abu'l Fazl was sent to deal with him but the prince had him assassinated. Akbar then reconciled with him and Salim returned to Allahabad, where he spent his time drinking and taking opium before returning to the royal court in 1604.

After Khusrau Mirza's death in 1622 at Burhanpur, he was buried alongside his mother Shah Begum in a garden near Khuldabad. This garden was later named Khusro Bagh after him. In March 1624, Jai Singh I and other Kachwaha nobles seem to have retired from Deccan under Parviz Mirza and Mahabat Khan. On the orders of Jahangir, they proceeded to Allahabad to check Prince Khurram's rebellion. After capturing Jaunpur, Prince Khurram ordered the siege of Allahabad. The siege was however lifted by Abdulla Khan after Parwez and Mahabat Khan came to assist the garrison.

A unique artefact associated with Jahangir's reign found in Allahabad is a large jade terrapin, now in the British Museum's collection. In 1630–31, a man named Abdal near dense forests of Allahabad rebelled, constructed a fort and used to plunder passersby. The subedar Qulij Khan Turani consequently attacked him, arrested 1,000 rebels while their ladies committed jauhar. The place was renamed Islamabad and the temple constructed by the rebel was converted into a mosque.

During the Mughal war of succession, the commandant of the fort of Allahabad who had joined Shah Shuja made an agreement with Aurangzeb's officers and surrendered it to Khan Dauran on 12 January 1659. In 1720, the Sayyid brothers negotiated the surrender of the rebellious governor Girdhar Bahadur, under the condition of him being made the governor of Awadh, being able to appoint all civil and military officers in the province and being given 30 lakh rupees from Bengal's treasury.

==== Nawabs of Awadh ====
The East India Company coveted the fort for the same reasons of military strategy for which Akbar built it. British troops were first stationed at Allahabad fort in 1765 as part of the Treaty of Allahabad signed by Lord Robert Clive, Mughal emperor Shah Alam II, and Nawab of Awadh Shuja-ud-Daula. The combined forces of Bengal's Nawab Mir Qasim, Shuja and Shah Alam were defeated by the English at Buxar in October 1764 and at Kora in May 1765. Alam who was abandoned by Shuja after the defeats, surrendered to the English and was lodged at the fort, as they captured Allahabad, Benares and Chunar in his name. The territories of Allahabad and Kora were given to the emperor after the treaty was signed in 1765.

Shah Alam spent six years in the Allahabad fort and after the capture of Delhi in 1771 by the Marathas, left for his capital in under their protection. He was escorted to Delhi by Mahadaji Shinde and left Allahabad in May 1771. During their short stay, Marathas constructed two temples in the city, one of them being the famous Alopi Devi Mandir. After reaching Delhi in January 1772 and realising the Maratha intent of territorial encroachment, however, Shah Alam ordered his general Najaf Khan to drive them out. In retaliation, Tukoji Rao Holkar and Visaji Krushna Biniwale attacked Delhi and defeated Mughal forces in 1772. The Marathas were granted an imperial sanad for Kora and Allahabad. They turned their attention to Oudh to gain these two territories. Shuja was however, unwilling to give them up and made appeals to the English and the Marathas did not fare well at the Battle of Ramghat. In August and September 1773, Warren Hastings met Shuja and concluded a treaty, under which Kora and Allahabad were ceded to the Nawab for a payment of 50 lakh rupees.

Saadat Ali Khan II after being made the Nawab by John Shore, entered into a treaty with the Company and gave the fort to the British in 1798. Lord Wellesley after threatening to annex the entire Awadh, concluded a treaty with Saadat on abolishing the independent Awadhi army, imposing a larger subsidiary force and annexing Rohilkhand, Gorakhpur and the Doab in 1801.

In 1765, the combined forces of the Nawab of Awadh and the Mughal emperor Shah Alam II lost the Battle of Buxar to the British. Although the British did not take over their states at that time, they established a garrison at Fort Allahabad, understanding its strategic position as the gateway to the northwest. Governor General Warren Hastings later took Allahabad from Shah Alam and gave it to Awadh, alleging that he had placed himself in the power of the Marathas.

=== British rule ===
In 1801 the Nawab of Awadh ceded the city to the British East India Company. Gradually the other parts of Doab and adjoining regions to its west (including the Delhi and Ajmer-Merwara regions) were won by the British. These northwestern areas were made into a new province called the North-Western Provinces, with its capital at Agra. Allahabad was located in this province.

Acquired in 1801, Allahabad asides from its importance as a pilgrimage center, it was a stepping stone to the agrarian track upcountry and the Grand Trunk Road. It also potentially offered sizeable revenues to the Company. Initial revenue settlements began in 1803. The qanungos assisted the British Collector Edward Cuthbert. They provided physical paper records and histories of revenue returns which helped in negotiations with the cultivators, tehsildars, zamindars and those who owned rent-free lands.

In 1834, Allahabad became the seat of the Government of Agra Province and a High Court was established. A year later both were relocated to Agra.

In 1857, Allahabad was active in the Indian Mutiny. After the mutiny, the British truncated the Delhi region of the state, merging it with Punjab, and transferred the capital of the North-Western Provinces to Allahabad, where it remained for the next twenty years.

In 1877 the two provinces of Agra and Awadh were merged to form a new state which was called the United Provinces of Agra and Oudh. Allahabad was the capital of this new state till the 1920s.

=== Independence movement and other political movements. ===
During the Mutiny of 1857, Allahabad had only a small garrison of European troops. Taking advantage of this, the rebels brought Allahabad under their control. Maulvi Liaquat Ali, one of the prominent leaders of the rebellion, was a native of the village of Mahgaon near Allahabad.

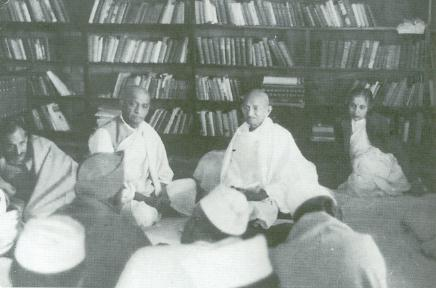
Mohandas K. Gandhi attends a Congress Working Committee meeting at Anand Bhavan. Vallabhbhai Patel is to his left, Vijaya Lakshmi Pandit to his right. January 1940.

After the Mutiny was quelled, the British established the High Court, the Police Headquarters and the Public Service Commission in the city. This transformed Allahabad into an administrative center, a status that it enjoys to this day.

The fourth and eighth session of the Indian National Congress was held in the city in 1888 and 1892 respectively on the extensive grounds of Darbhanga Castle, Allahabad. At the turn of the century, Allahabad also became a nodal point for the revolutionaries.

In 1931, at Alfred Park in Allahabad, the revolutionary Chandrashekhar Azad killed himself when surrounded by the British Police. The Nehru family homes of Anand Bhavan and Swaraj Bhavan, both in Allahabad, were at the center of the political activities of the Indian National Congress. In the years of the struggle for Indian independence, thousands of satyagrahis (nonviolent resistors), led by Purshottam Das Tandon, Bishambhar Nath Pande and Narayan Dutt Tiwari, went to jail. The first Prime Minister of India, Jawaharlal Nehru, as well as several Union ministers such as Mangla Prasad, Muzaffar Hasan, K. N. Katju, and Lal Bahadur Shastri, were natives of Allahabad.

The first seeds of the idea of Pakistan were sown in Allahabad. On 29 December 1930, Allama Muhammad Iqbal's presidential address to the All-India Muslim League proposed a separate Muslim state for the Muslim majority regions of India.

After independence, areas from the adjoining region of Bagelkhand in the east were merged with Allahabad district, which remain part of the district to this day. The Mayawati government split the original Allahabad district into two districts, Kaushambi and Allahabad district. From 16 October 2018 it is officially renamed as Prayagraj.

== Historical sites ==
Prayagraj is the birthplace of two Indian prime ministers, Jawaharlal Nehru and his daughter Indira Gandhi; the Nehru family estate, Anand Bhavan, is a museum. Two other prime ministers of India. Vishwanath Pratap Singh and Chandra Shekhar were also associated with Prayagraj.

== Education ==
Allahabad University was founded on 23 September 1887, making it the fourth oldest university in India. It has been granted Central University status. Allahabad University is a major literary centre for Hindi studies. Many Bihari, Bengali and Gujarati scholars spent their lives here, propagated their works in Hindi and enriched the literature. In the 19th century, Allahabad University earned the epithet of 'Oxford of the East'.

== See also ==
- Timeline of Prayagraj
- Akshayavata

== Bibliography ==
- Imperial Gazetteer of India, by William Wilson Hunter, James Sutherland Cotton, Sir Richard Burn, William Stevenson Meyer, Great Britain India Office, John George Bartholomew. Published by Clarendon Press, 1908.
- A Hand-book for Visitors to Lucknow: With Preliminary Notes on Allahabad and Cawnpore, by Henry George Keene. Published by Asian Educational Services, 2000 (original 1875). ISBN 81-206-1527-1.
- Allahabad: A Study in Urban Geography, by Ujagir Singh. Published by Banaras Hindu University, 1966.
- Employment and Migration in Allahabad City, by Maheshchand, Mahesh Chand, India Planning Commission. Research Programmes Committee. Published by Oxford & IBH Pub. Co., 1969.
- Subah of Allahabad Under the Great Mughals, 1580–1707: 1580–1707, by Surendra Nath Sinha. Published by Jamia Millia Islamia, 1974.
- A political history of the imperial Guptas, by Tej Ram Sharma
- The Local Roots of Indian Politics: Allahabad, 1880–1920, by Christopher Alan Bayly. Published by Clarendon Press, 1975.
- Triveni: Essays on the Cultural Heritage of Allahabad, by D. P. Dubey, Neelam Singh, Society of Pilgrimage Studies. Published by Society of Pilgrimage Studies, 1996. ISBN 81-900520-2-0.
- Magha Inscriptions in the Allahabad Museum, by Siddheshwari Narain Roy. Published by Raka Prakashana for the Museum, 1999.
- The Last Bungalow: Writings on Allahabad, by Arvind Krishna Mehrotra. Published by Penguin Books, 2007. ISBN 0-14-310118-8.
- "Allahabad" . Encyclopædia Britannica. Vol. 1 (11th ed.). 1911. p. 687.
- Allahabad The Imperial Gazetteer of India, 1909, v. 5, pp. 226–242.
