= List of tourist attractions in Prayagraj =

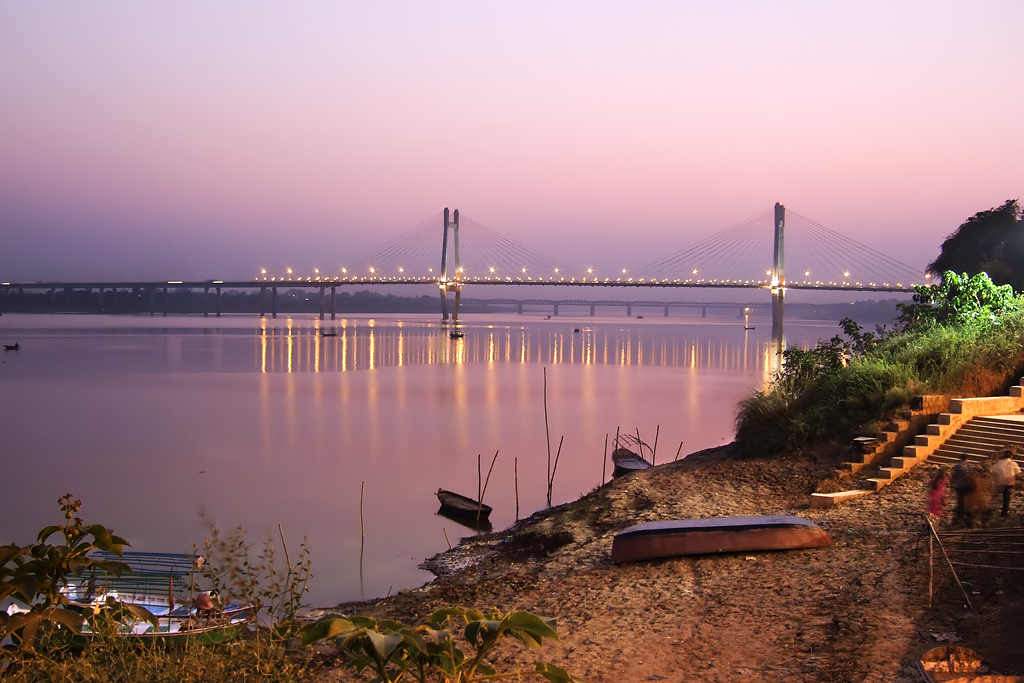
The New Yamuna Bridge, India's longest cable-stayed bridge and the iconic monument of Prayagraj, attracts considerable numbers of tourists.

Prayagraj (formerly Allahabad), a city in the State of Uttar Pradesh, India is an important tourist destination attracting many tourists annually. Enriched with a glorious history and being one of the oldest cities in the world. Prayagraj is famous worldwide for the Kumbh Mela, a holy religious gathering of Hindu pilgrims which also attracts many tourists and has been taking place in the city from ancient times. Prayagraj has also several historical monuments from different periods of Indian History, from the tomb of Khusru, in Khusrobagh which was built during the medieval period under Mughal Rule to All Saints Cathedral in Civil Lines built during the British Raj to Alopi Devi Mandir in Alopibagh which is one of the oldest Hindu temples built during the ancient period. Several more historical locations like the Allahabad Fort built by Emperor Akbar during the Mughal Rule to several ancient Hindu temples like the Hanuman Temple near Sangam adorn the city. There are several other places of interest like the Allahabad University which was built by the British during the British Raj to several contemporary monuments, each depicting a different time-period in the history of the city.

Types	Picture	Attraction	Period	Description
Holy river		Triveni Sangam	-	It is the "confluence" of two physical rivers Ganges, Yamuna, and the invisible or mythical Saraswati. It is a place of religious importance and the site for historic Kumbh Mela held every 12 years.
Park		Chandrashekhar Azad Park	1931	Formerly known as Alfred park and Company Garden, it is a public park of 133 acres area and is the biggest park in Prayagraj. It is renamed after freedom fighter Chandra Shekhar Azad, who sacrificed his life here, during the Indian independence struggle in 1931.
Cathedral		All Saints Cathedral	1887	A noted Anglican Cathedral in Prayagraj. It is an example of 13th-century Gothic style buildings in Asia built by the British during their rule in India. In 1871 AD, British architect Sir William Emerson, architect of Victoria Memorial, Kolkata, designed this monument. It was consecrated in 1887
Fort		Allahabad Fort	1583	Allahabad Fort was built by Emperor Ashoka but repaired by Emperor Akbar in 1583. The fort stands on the banks of the Yamuna near the confluence with the river Ganges. It is the largest fort built by Akbar. In its prime, the fort was unrivaled for its design, construction and craftsmanship. This huge fort has three galleries flanked by high towers.
High Court		Allahabad High Court	1869	A fine example of Georgian architecture, it was one of the first high courts to be established in India.
Museum		Allahabad Museum	1931	Established in 1931, it is known for its rich collection and unique objects of art, and is funded by Ministry of Culture.
University		Allahabad University	1887	One of the oldest universities established in the Indian subcontinent. Its origins lie in the Muir Central College, named after Lt. Governor of North-Western Provinces, Sir William Muir in 1876, who suggested the idea of a Central University at Prayagraj, which later evolved to the present university. At one point it was called the "Oxford of the East",
Museum		Anand Bhavan	1930	Anand Bhavan is a large bungalow in Prayagraj which has been turned into museum. It was constructed by Indian political leader Motilal Nehru in the 1930s to serve as the new residence of the Nehru family when the original mansion Swaraj Bhavan was transformed into the local headquarters of the Indian National Congress.
Neighborhood		Civil Lines	19th century	Formerly known as Cannington it is the central business district of Prayagraj, and is famous for its urban setting, gridiron plan roads, high rise buildings, offices, cafes, restaurants, hotels, malls, shopping complexes, theatres etc. The area was built by the British during the heyday of the British Raj and was a residential colony of the British at that time. The present day Civil Lines has several skyscrapers and modern buildings which show the constant change taking place in the city.
Planetarium		Jawahar Planetarium	1979	The planetarium was built in 1979 and is situated beside Anand Bhavan, the former residence of the Nehru-Gandhi family. It is managed by the 'Jawaharlal Nehru Memorial Fund' (established 1964), which has its headquarters at Teen Murti House, New Delhi.
Garden		Khusro Bagh	18th century	It is a large walled mughal garden surrounding the mausoleums of Khusrau Mirza (died 1622), eldest son of emperor Jahangir, Shah Begum, Khusrau's mother (died 1604), a Rajput princess and Jahangir's first wife, and that of Princess Sultan Nithar Begam (died c.1624), Khusrau's sister. It presents an exquisite example of Mughal architecture
Festival		Kumbh Mela	-	It is a mass Hindu pilgrimage of faith in which Hindus gather to bathe in a sacred river. It is considered to be largest peaceful gathering in the world with over 100 million people visiting during the Maha Kumbh Mela in 2013.
Public Library/Meeting Hall		Mayo Memorial Hall	1879	A large public library cum meeting hall in Prayagraj, situated near the Thornhill Mayne Memorial, was meant for public meetings, balls and receptions in commemoration of the assassinated Viceroy. Mayo Memorial Hall was designed by Richard Roskell Bayne and was completed in 1879.
Park		Minto Park	19th century	The park is a historical site for in 1858 Earl Canning read out the declaration of Queen Victoria's Proclamation which resulted in the complete transfer of control over India from The East India Company to the government of Britain.
Bridge		New Yamuna Bridge	2004	It is the longest cable-stayed bridge of India, located in Prayagraj The bridge was constructed by the end of 2004 with the aim of minimizing the traffic over the Old Naini Bridge. The bridge runs north–south across the Yamuna river connecting the city of Allahabad to its neighborhood of Naini.
Ghat		Saraswati Ghat	2002	Saraswati Ghat is probably the most spectacular ghat in Prayagraj on the bank of Yamuna river. It is located close to Mankameshwar Temple of lord Shiva. The name of ghat comes from Hindu Goddess of learning Saraswati. It is a newly built delightful place. Stairs from three sides descend to the greenish water of the Yamuna. And above there is a park which is always covered with green grass.
Fort		Ulta Qila	1855	This mound, on which Samudra Koop & Ulta Qila are located, is also known as ‘Kot’. A big walled well is located on the mound. It is believed that this ‘Samudra Koop’ is the one, which is aptly described in Matsya Puran & Padm Puran while archaeologists believe that it was built during the reign of Samudra Gupta hence this name. Till 1855, this area was in the form of a mound only but in the same year, a Vaishnav saint Sudarshan Das from Ayodhya renovated the well and got an ashram & a temple built here. This area has big stairs on the Ganges side along with many caves. Five similar wells are found in Ujjain, Mathura, Allahabad, Varanasi & Patalpur also. Harbenga, the local ruler was very cruel. He hatched the conspiracy of maligning the Sheikh Taqui Baba- a local saint. As a consequence of curses of baba, his evil designs boom ranged and his fort got topsiturveyed (Ulta Qila) and his set up was totally destroyed in a big fire, so the place came to be known as Jhulsi or Jhunsi. But according to some documents released by the Archaeological Department, this incidence happened due to the curses of Guru Gorakhnath, the disciple of Matseyndra Nath.
Clock Tower		Prayagraj Clock Tower	1913	Prayagraj Clock Tower is an architectural clock tower located in Prayagraj, Uttar Pradesh, India also known as Chowk Ghantaghar. It was constructed in 1913. It is a landmark of Old Prayagraj and reminds us one of finest structures in India. It is located in centre of the Chowk, Prayagraj
Mansion		Swaraj Bhavan	19th century	A large mansion located in Prayagraj which was owned by Indian political leader Motilal Nehru in the 19th century, it has served as the ancestral home of the Nehru-Gandhi Family — future Prime Minister of India Indira Gandhi was born there. The First Prime Minister of India Jawaharlal Nehru was however not born in Anand Bhawan.
