= Saraswati Ghat =

- सरस्वती घाट

Religion
- Affiliation: Hinduism

Location
- Location: Prayagraj
- Country: India

Saraswati Ghat is probably the most spectacular ghat in Prayagraj on the bank of Yamuna river in the Indian state of Uttar Pradesh. It is located close to Mankameshwar Temple of lord Shiva. The name of ghat comes from Hindu Goddess of learning Saraswati. It is a newly built place. Stairs from three sides descend to the greenish water of the Yamuna. Above there is a park which is covered with green grass.

Around the corner of Akbar's Fort near Triveni Sangam, this ghat hosts a nightly aarti with lighting of lamps. There are facilities of food court also routes to reach Sangam by boat from here.

== Ropeway facility ==
It was proposed in the year 2017 that Prayagraj would get a ropeway facility over Yamuna near Sangam before Kumbh. The tourism department has forwarded a proposal to the state government for approval.

"Two sites- Boat Club and near Saraswati Ghat have been suggested in the proposal for the facility. It will take tourists to a stretch near Arail," said Anupam Srivastava, regional tourism officer. But nothing took form of reality and the project is perhaps abandoned.

== See also ==
- List of tourist attractions in Prayagraj
