= Bharati Bhavan Library =

Coordinates: 25°26′10.19″N 81°50′4.71″E

Bharati Bhavan Library a Hindi and Urdu public library in Allahabad, India. The library was established in 1889 by the joint efforts of Pt. Madan Mohan Malviya and Mr. Bal Krishna Bhatt of Chowk, Allahabad.

== History ==
Brij Mohan Lal Bhalla was himself a great lover of Hindi and had made a large collection of Hindi books. These he gave away to form a library for which he also provided accommodation in his own premises. He met all the expenses of the library in the initial years. He creates a Trust with a sum of Rs. 47,200 out of which Rs. 10,000 was earmarked for the construction of a building for it. He did not live to see the building created; having contracted a fatal disease on a pilgrimage to Badri Nath in 1901, he died on 15 May 1902. He had satisfaction, however, of hearing just before he died that the foundation stone of the building had been laid. Lala Ram Charan Das another wealthy philanthropist had undertaken at his instance to put up a building for the library which he did at a cost of exceeding Rs. 22,000/- himself meeting the amount spent in excess of the sum of Rs. 10,000/- provided in the Trust. The building was formally opened on 12 May 1913 at a function presided over by Dr. Sir Sundar Lal. Speaking on the occasion Malaviya dwelt on the importance of propagating knowledge (Vidyadan), citing the Hindu Shastras in support of his views.

Malaviya identified himself closely with the library. He had not taken a conspicuous part in establishing the library as he was away in Kalakankar editing the Hindustan till about a month before its foundation, but he was an enthusiastic supporter of the movement which it represented. His cousin Jai Govind Malaviya who was the principal teacher of Sanskrit at the Government High School Allahabad, had given it his priceless collection of Sanskrit manuscripts which together with the Hindi collection donated by Brij Mohan Lal Bhalla constituted the initial stock of the library. He was a member of the first Managing Committee which drew up its constitution and defined its aims and objects at its meeting on 26 November 1889. These were conceived in a liberal spirit and reflect the vision of the promoters. The books in the library were to be available to anyone who asked for them. The Library was to acquire books in Hindi and Sanskrit. It would accept books in other languages as gifts but not purchase them at a price. It would subscribe for at least ten journals-dailies, weeklies and monthlies. It was also to encourage writers of good books. A further object, later added at the time of registration of the Trust (but never implemented) was to collect manuscripts of Sanskrit and Hindi books and to edit and publish them within the limits of available funds. The Library received the constant care of its promoters, Lal Behari, Balkrishna Bhatt and Jai Govind Malaviya who met daily on the upper story of the house of Brij Mohan Lal Bhalla. Malaviya joined them frequently.
