= Chowk, Prayagraj =

Neighborhood in Prayagraj, Uttar Pradesh, India

- South Prayagraj- Business Market
- Interactive map of Chowk, Prayagraj
- Coordinates: 25°26′12.44″N 81°50′2.72″E
- Country: India
- State: Uttar Pradesh
- Metropolis: Prayagraj

Government
  - Body: Prayagraj Metropolitan Region

Chowk is a neighborhood in Prayagraj, Uttar Pradesh, India. It is the historic city centre of Old Prayagraj. It is one of the oldest & largest business markets of India & lies in old Prayagraj. The landmark of this market is historic Prayagraj Clock Tower, built in 1913, also known as Chowk Ghantaghar.

== History ==
Chowk is a historical point, where once stood the Neem tree where numerous freedom fighters were hanged in the first Indian War of Independence. The old church is situated here. The Grand Trunk Road passed through Chowk in its early days.

The area once had, residence of Pt Motilal Nehru and his son, Jawaharlal Nehru, the first Prime minister of India, Jawaharlal Nehru was born in an area called Mir Ganj, which is now the notorious red light district of Prayagraj, (which is now closed as per PIL filed and action taken by Highcourt Allahabad)

Other dignities from this area are Pt Madan Mohan Malviya and Pt Hariprasad Chaurasia.

== Geography ==
Chowk is situated in southern part of Prayagraj Municipal Corporation. It is part of the Ganges plain with alluvium soil.

== Amenities ==
The main market of Prayagraj is a traditional bazaar, with products from garments to spices, sweets papads and vegetables in the morning.

== Culture ==
During Dusherra festivals Chowk is crowded with tens of thousands of people for watching the Chowkis of Pajava and Patherchatti Ramlila committees, that adorn their chowkis in competition.

== Education ==
Bharati Bhavan Library is located in Chowk, containing many old Hindi manuscripts.

== Transport ==
Autorickshaws used to ply to Katra, Prayagraj and other places. Public transport consists of cycle rickshaw. Roads are narrow and congested as it is part of the old city with little scope for expansion.

== See also ==
- List of tourist attractions in Prayagraj
- Neighbourhoods of Prayagraj
