= Allahabad Museum =

Coordinates: 25.4551°N 81.8462°E

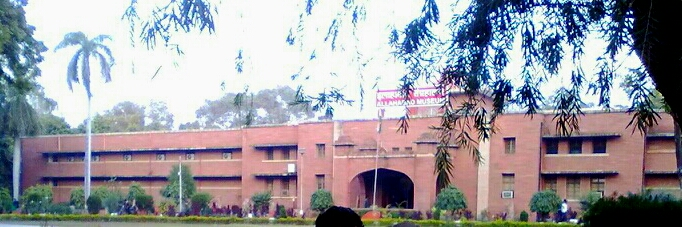
- Allahabad Museum
- Established: 1931, 91 years ago
- Location: Kamla Nehru Road, Prayagraj, India
- Type: National Museum
- Director: Rajesh Prasad
- Website: theallahabadmuseum.com

The Allahabad Museum is a national-level museum in Prayagraj, Uttar Pradesh.

Established in 1931, it is known for its rich collection and unique objects of art, and is funded by Ministry of Culture. Moreover, it is a premier research centre for archaeologists, historians and academicians and carries out extensive research activities and publications in archaeology, art and literature. Its rock art gallery has the largest collection of prehistoric paintings displayed in India dating from 14,000 B.C to 2000 B.C. The museum, using solar power system, has become the first museum in the country to become self-reliant in power generation. The Allahabad Museum is centrally located in the Civil Lines area of the city in a lush green garden at Chandrashekhar Azad Park, popularly known as Company Bagh. It is about 3 km away from the Allahabad railway junction and almost equidistant from three different Railway Stations such as Prayag, Rambagh and Prayagraj junction and about 12 km away from Prayagraj Airport.

== History ==
A museum was originally set up in Allahabad in 1863 by North-West Province Governor General Sir William Muir, before being shut down in 1881 because it was situated in one of the empty barracks which, besides being liable to injury by fire and storm, was quite unsuited to the purposes of institution. After the initiative to reopen the museum was taken by Jawaharlal Nehru, the then President of the Allahabad Municipal Board, stalwarts like Madan Mohan Malviya and the then leading newspaper The Pioneer, the museum was eventually opened in the Municipal Board building in 1931. Due to space constraint, the museum was shifted to the present building at the Alfred Park. The foundation stone of the present museum building was laid on 14 December 1947 by Jawaharlal Nehru and the museum was opened to the public in 1954. In 1985 it was declared an Institution of National Importance.

== Collection ==
The museum houses galleries each devoted to Mahatma Gandhi and Jawaharlal Nehru. The Gandhi Gallery displays rare pictures of Gandhi from his childhood till death, while the Nehru Gallery features Nehru's original manuscripts called 'In and Out of Prison' which were later published as his autobiography The Discovery of India. His other collection includes documents, gifts, wedding cards and letters, including some from Gandhi himself. The museum's another valued possession is the Gandhi Smriti Vahan, the 47-Model V-8 Ford truck on which Gandhi's ashes were immersed in the Triveni Sangam on 12 February 1948.

The pistol of Chandrashekhar Azad, a Colt Model 1903 Pocket Hammerless semi-auto .32 bore, is displayed and preserved in the entrance hall of the museum. Azad used it to shoot himself after a long firefight with British policemen at the Alfred Park, the same year the museum was established.

The museum boasts 19 exclusive canvasses painted by the Russian painter, Nicholas Roerich. There are 10 Roerich Halls all over the world, including the one at Allahabad Museum.

The museum's library stores 25,000 books, including rare collections of Loeb Classical Library — translated works of ancient Roman and Greek scholars.

== See also ==
- List of tourist attractions in Allahabad
- List of museums in India
- Allahabad Public Library
