= Mayo Memorial Hall =

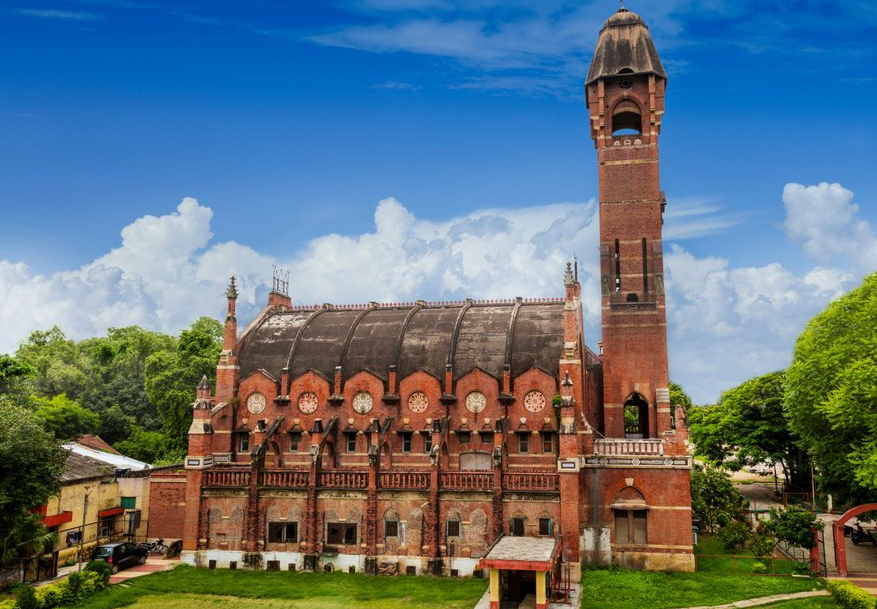
- Interactive map of the Mayo Memorial Hall area

General information
- Location: Prayagraj, Uttar Pradesh; India
- Coordinates: 25.4601607°N 81.8434835°E
- Completed: 1879
- Governing body: Local

Design and construction
- Architect: Richard Roskell Bayne

Mayo Memorial and Town Hall (commonly Mayo Hall) is a large meeting hall in Prayagraj, situated near the Thornhill Mayne Memorial, having a 180 feet high tower . The interior of this memorial hall was ornamented with designs by Professor Gamble of the South Kensington Museum, London. Mayo Memorial Hall was designed by Richard Roskell Bayne and was completed in 1879. The hall was meant for public meetings, balls and receptions in commemoration of the assassinated Viceroy Mayo.

== History ==
The Mayo Memorial Hall was constructed in 1879 and served as a venue for public functions, funded by subscription. The hall was established to commemorate the assassinated Viceroy of India. It was intended for hosting public meetings, balls, and official receptions of Lieutenant-Governor's Council during the British colonial period. The hall's interior was decorated according to designs sent from England by Professor Gamble of the South Kensington Museum (now the Victoria and Albert Museum), London. A further wing of the building was added in 1954. The building is now known as the Amitabh Bachchan Sports Complex.

== Architecture ==
Designed by Richard Roskell Bayne (1837–1901), an engineer with the East Indian Railway, the Mayo Memorial Hall features a semicircular concrete roof and a 55-metre high tower. The interior includes a notable dance floor and exhibits decorative elements in line with Victorian-era design sensibilities. Its original design was influenced by British institutional aesthetics, with contributions from Professor Gamble of the museum that later became the Victoria and Albert Museum. The building stands as a prominent example of Raj-era architecture.It was situated near the Thornhill and Myne Memorial. This hall is known for its large 180 feet high tower.

== See also ==
- List of tourist attractions in Prayagraj
