= Katra, Prayagraj =

Market neighbourhood in Uttar Pradesh, India

Katra is a locality/township of Prayagraj, Uttar Pradesh, India. It is one of the major markets of Prayagraj city and is located in the Prayagraj to region of the city. The market is divided into 4 lanes from Netram crossing- Old Katra, New Katra & Katra Extension. The nearby area,New Katra, is a residential area and houses some of the wealthy of the city.
