= Jawahar Planetarium =

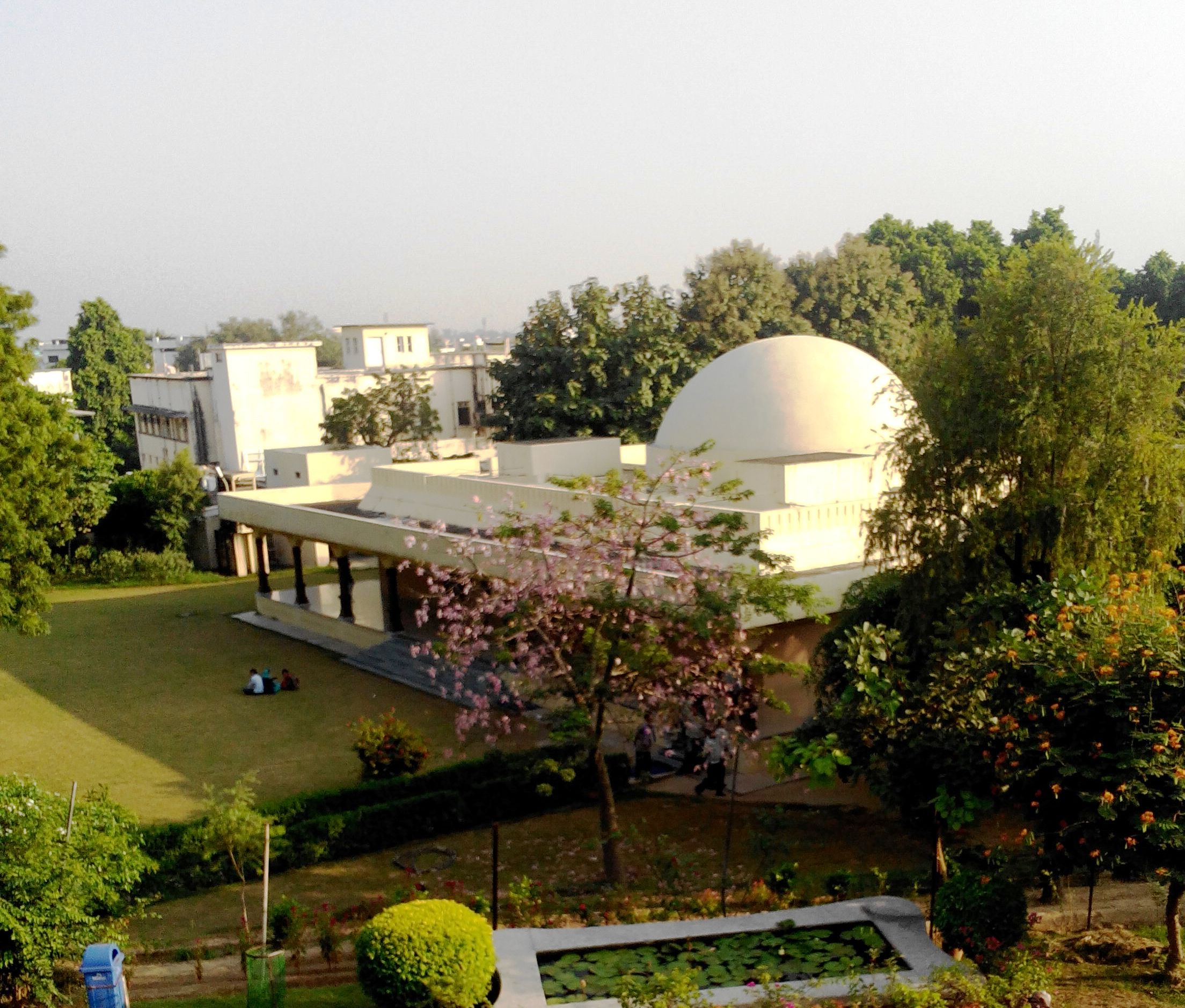
- The front of Jawahar Planetarium
- Established: 1975
- Location: Prayagraj, UP, India
- Coordinates: 25.45890°N 81.86024°E
- Type: Science museum
- Owner: Jawaharlal Nehru Memorial Fund

The Jawahar Planetarium is located in the city of Prayagraj in Uttar Pradesh, India. It was built in 1979 and is situated beside Anand Bhavan, the former residence of the Nehru-Gandhi family, and now a museum. It is managed by the 'Jawaharlal Nehru Memorial Fund' (established 1964), which has its headquarters at Teen Murti House, New Delhi.

Each year, the prestigious 'Jawaharlal Nehru Memorial Lecture' is also held at the planetarium, organised under the auspices of Jawaharlal Nehru Memorial Fund on the birth anniversary of India's first prime minister, 14 November.

== See also ==
- Astrotourism in India
- Nehru Planetarium
- Swami Vivekananda Planetarium, Mangalore
- List of tourist attractions in Prayagraj
- List of planetariums
