= Minto Park, Prayagraj =

Historical park in Prayagraj, India

Madan Mohan Malaviya Park formerly known as Minto Park, is a park in Prayagraj, India. It is located in the southern part of the city along the banks of Yamuna river. The park is a historical site because in 1858 Earl Canning read out the declaration of Queen Victoria's Proclamation (at 1 November 1858), which resulted in the complete transfer of control over India from The East India Company to the government of Britain. To commemorate the 50th anniversary of the event, the Earl of Minto installed a proclamation pillar in 1908. The marble pillar was topped with busts of Queen Victoria and Edward VII. In 1910, the park was named Minto Park. After independence, the marble busts atop the pillar were replaced by the Ashokan Lion Capital and park renamed Madan Mohan Malaviya Park.

== See also ==
- List of tourist attractions in Prayagraj
