= Swaraj Bhavan =

Mansion in Prayagraj, India

Coordinates: 25.460097°N 81.860599°E

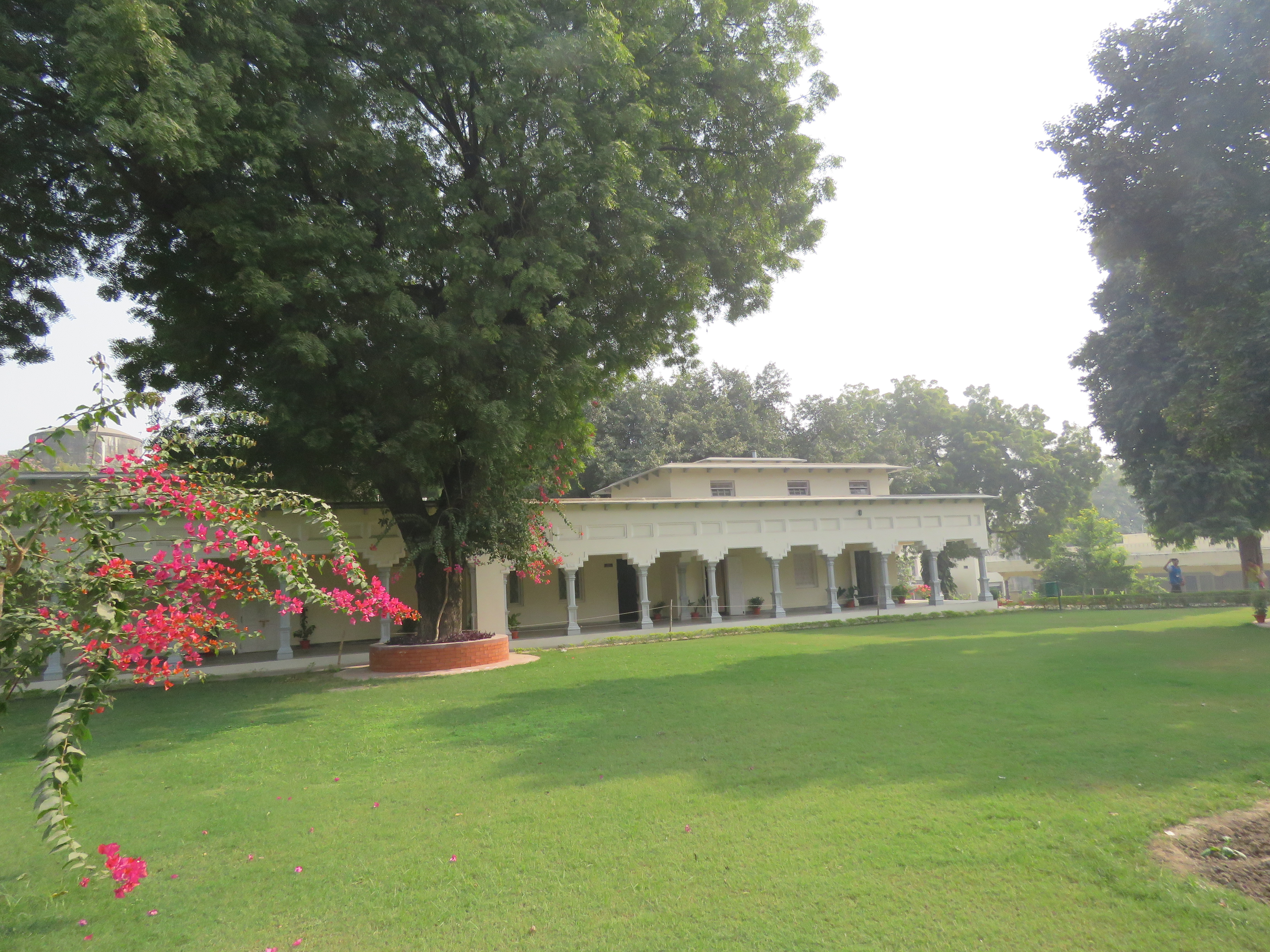
- Swaraj Bhavan
- Interactive map of the Swaraj Bhavan area
- Former names: Anand Bhavan (abode of happiness)

General information
- Location: Prayagraj, India

Design and construction
- Known for: Residence of Nehru family 1900–1930

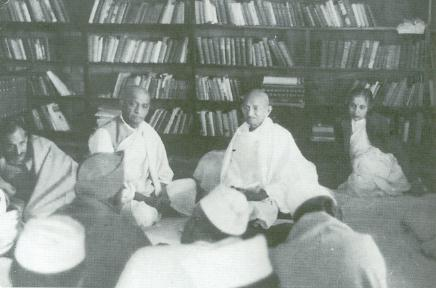
Mahatma Gandhi attends a Congress Working Committee meeting at Swaraj Bhavan, Vallabhbhai Patel to the left, Vijaya Lakshmi Pandit to the right, January 1940.

Swaraj Bhavan (formerly Anand Bhavan, meaning Abode of Bliss) is a large mansion located in Prayagraj, India, best known for once being owned by the Indian political leader Motilal Nehru and being home to the Nehru family until 1930.

It is managed by the 'Jawaharlal Nehru Memorial Fund', Delhi and functions as a museum open to the public. It has 42 rooms and a number of memorabilia including a charkha used by Mahatma Gandhi, photographs of the Indian freedom movement, personal belongings of the Nehru family and an underground room that is said to have been used occasionally for meetings.

== History ==
=== Mahmud Manzil ===
The building at 1 Church road that is today called Swaraj Bhavan was originally called Mahmud Manzil. It was built in 1871 for Syed Ahmad Khan, the 19th century Indian Muslim leader and educationist, at the behest of the then Lieutenant Governor of the NWP (North West provinces) William Muir. The latter often took the advice of Syed Ahmad Khan in administrative matters which necessitated Khan's presence in Allahabad. However, since Khan lived in Aligarh, he did not have a place to stay in Allahabad for prolonged visits. Muir suggested that Khan maintain a house in Allahabad too, where he could stay during such official visits. A site consisting of 20 acres of land owned by a person called Shaikh Fayyaz Ali was selected for this purpose. It was located just 10 minutes drive from the Government House and Ali had received the land here as compensation for the losses incurred by him during the 1857 mutiny. Work to build a large house here commenced around 1868 and the house was completed in 1871. It was originally called "Mahmud Manzil" after Syed Ahmad Khan's son's name. It was later occupied by Syed Mahmud, who lived here as a tenant when he became the Justice of the Allahabad High Court. Fayyaz Ali continued to live on the estate till his death in 1873 in a bungalow called Bungalow Fatehpur Bishwa that he had made here. However, the connection between Sir Muir, Syed Ahmad Khan and Mahmud Manzil are unverified as different sources yield different results.

In 1873, when Fayyaz Ali died, the property was administered by the Allahabad court of wards, as his children were minors. Syed Khan continued to live here as a tenant. Subsequently the house changed hands and was sold in 1888. In a commemorative essay by Indira Gandhi, the latter recollects that the house was sold to Rai Bahadur Permanand Pathak, the Judge of Shahjahanpur during this period. However, the house gradually fell into a state of disrepair as it lay unoccupied for long periods of time.

In 1900, the house and the estate attached to it were bought for Rs. 19,000 and named Anand Bhavan, "abode of happiness", by Pandit Motilal Nehru, then a prominent lawyer.

Historian David Lelyveld has given a different sequence of events where the property was given an estate in 1861 in compensation for losses sustained during the revolt of 1857. This property was purchased by Syed Mahmud, a Justice of the Allahabad High Court, for Rs 9,000 in 1888.

=== Anand Bhavan ===
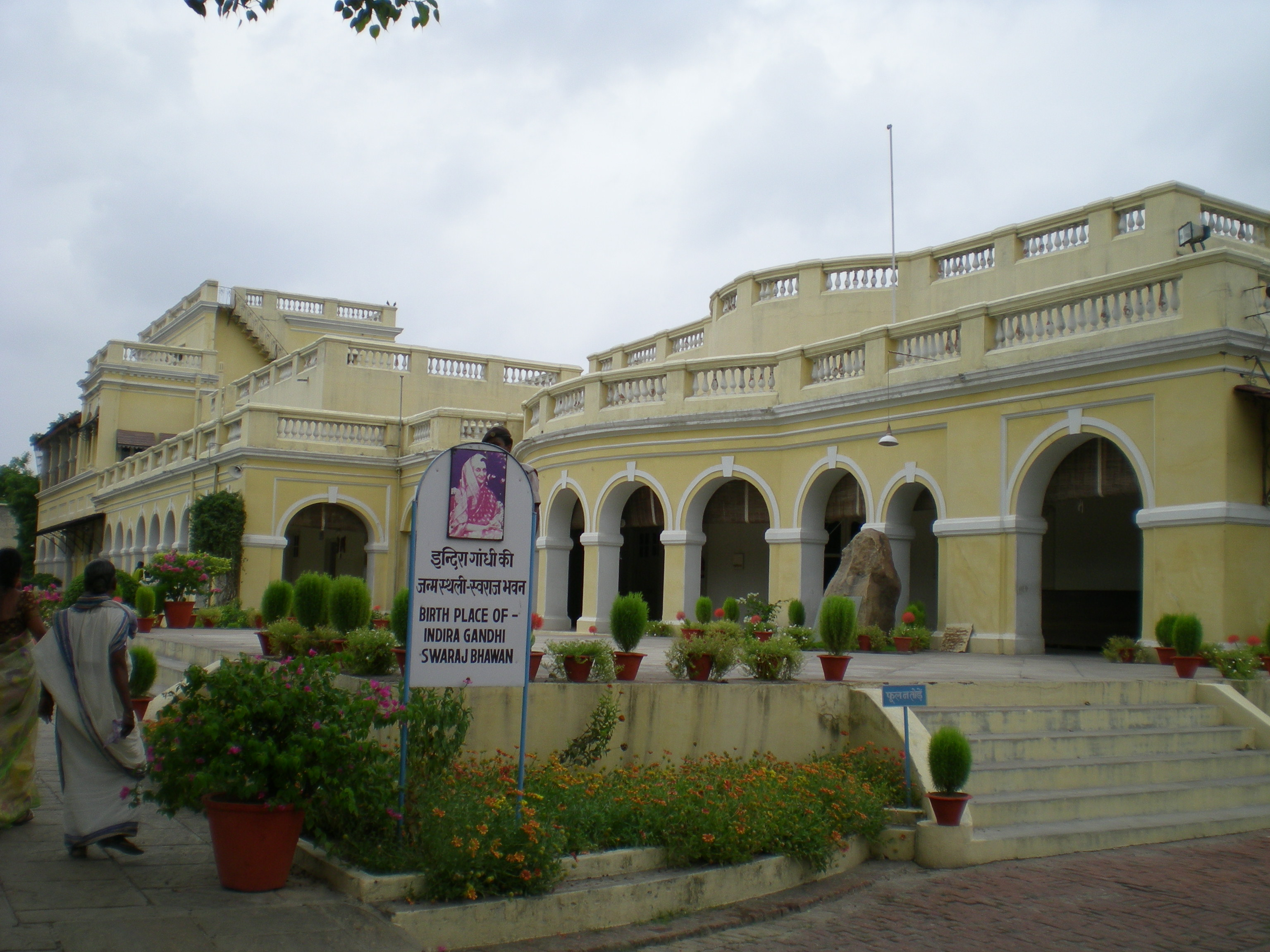
Swaraj Bhawan, previously called Anand Bhavan

Motilal Nehru then started to renovate the palatial residence. The house was in complete disrepair, but the estate was huge. Extensive renovation work was carried out over the next decade. Motilal used his frequent visits to Europe to buy the choicest furniture and china. He turned the mansion into a veritable palace, 'an elaborate replica of an English country estate … bifurcated between East and West', with a retinue of almost a hundred people in the house.

Ironically, at its house-warming party in 1871, Sir William Muir hoped that this large palatial home in Civil Lines of Allahabad would become the cement holding together the British Empire in India. Paradoxically, after being bought by Motilal Nehru in 1900, it went on to become a cradle to the Indian Freedom Struggle which was to destroy British rule in India.

=== Swaraj Bhavan ===
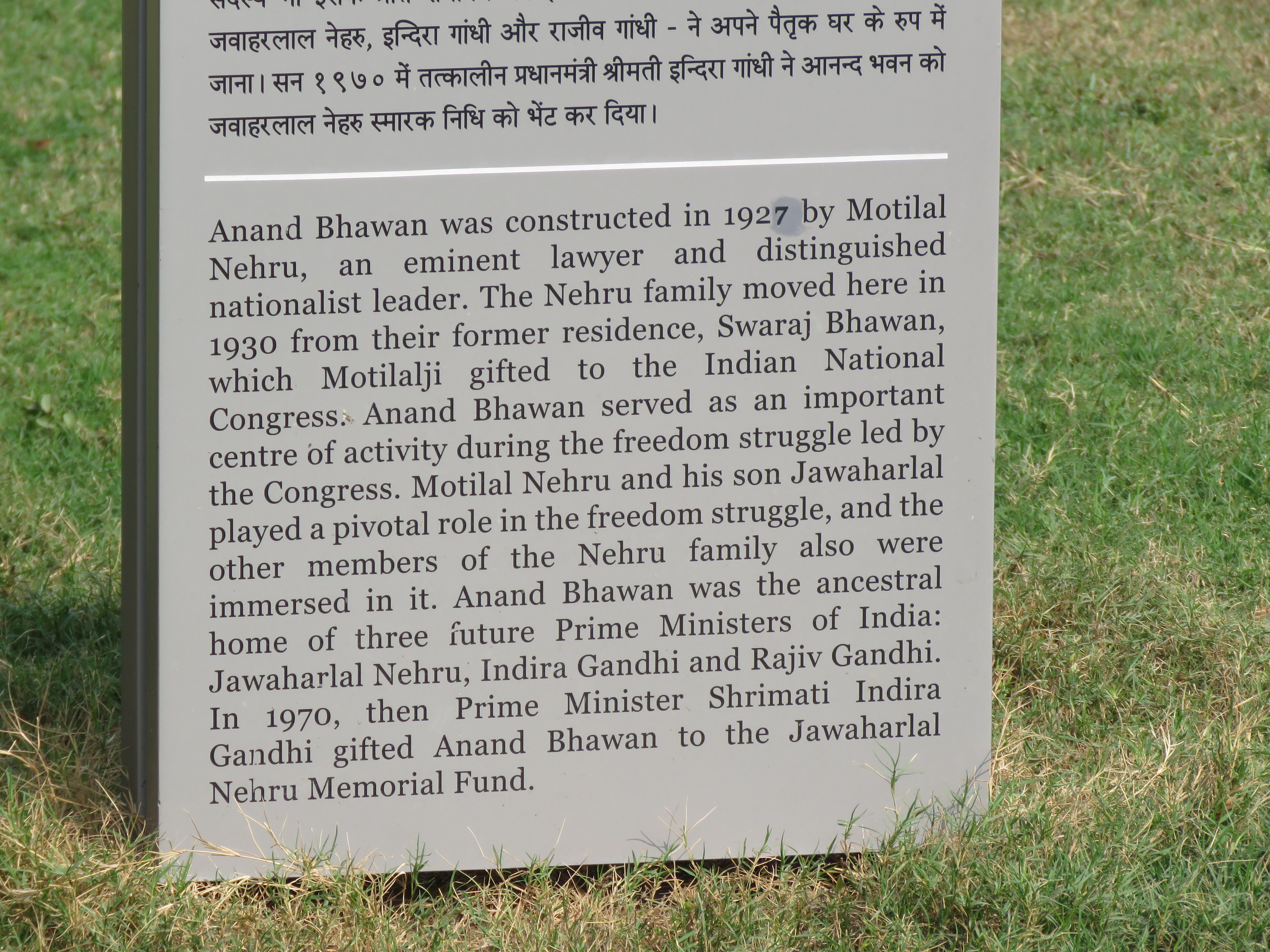
Memorial at the newer Anand Bhavan, Allahabad

Motilal Nehru was a prominent member of the Indian National Congress Party. Due to this, a number of noted leaders and party activists would visit the "Nehru House". Following the rise of Motilal's son, Jawaharlal Nehru, the mansion virtually became the center of the Indian independence movement. It was informally the headquarters of the All India Congress Committee in the 1920s before it was donated by Motilal Nehru to the Indian National Congress in 1930, to serve as the party's official headquarters in the region. The Nehrus built another house next to the old one and named that Anand Bhavan; the old house was renamed Swaraj Bhavan (lit. Abode of freedom).

=== Museum ===
Indira Gandhi, India's then Prime Minister, donated Anand Bhavan to the nation in 1970 and turned it into a museum housing the books and memorabilia of her father and grandfather. Today it is one of the country's best-run museums. Its pillared verandahs and high-ceilinged rooms have witnessed many trysts with destiny; some are known and documented by historians of modern India, others known only to its inmates who are no more.

Now, the Swaraj Bhavan premise conducts classes to teach arts and crafts to children.

A light and sound programme is also organized here. There are four shows every day.

== See also ==
- List of tourist attractions in Prayagraj
