= Anand Bhavan =

Historic house museum in Prayagraj, India

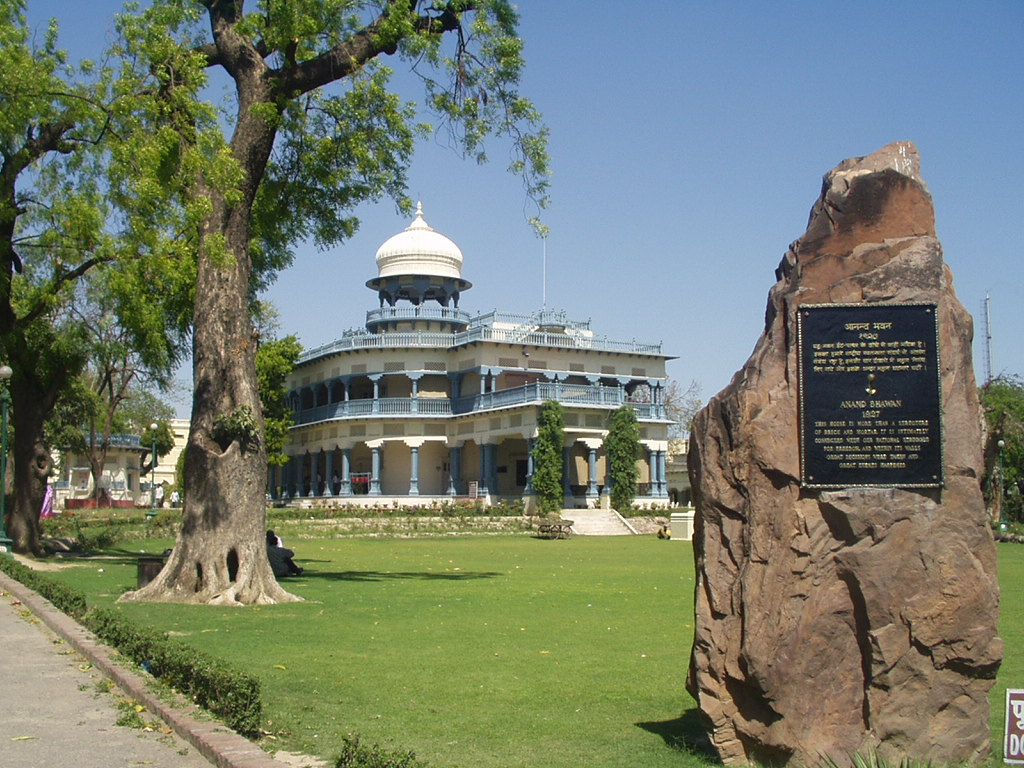
- Façade of Anand Bhavan
- Established: 1930; 96 years ago
- Location: Prayagraj, Uttar Pradesh, India
- Coordinates: 25.459376°N 81.8599815°E
- Type: Biographical museum Historic house museum

Anand Bhavan (lit. 'abode of happiness') is a historic house museum in Prayagraj, India, focusing on the Nehru family. It was bought by Indian political leader Motilal Nehru in the 1930s to serve as the residence of the Nehru family when the original mansion Swaraj Bhavan (previously called Anand Bhavan) was transformed into the local headquarters of the Indian National Congress. Jawahar Planetarium is situated here, which has been striving to inculcate scientific temper among masses through its sky shows on astronomy and science.

The residence was donated to the Government of India in 1970 by then Prime Minister of India, Indira Gandhi, the granddaughter of Motilal Nehru and daughter of Jawaharlal Nehru.

== Gallery ==
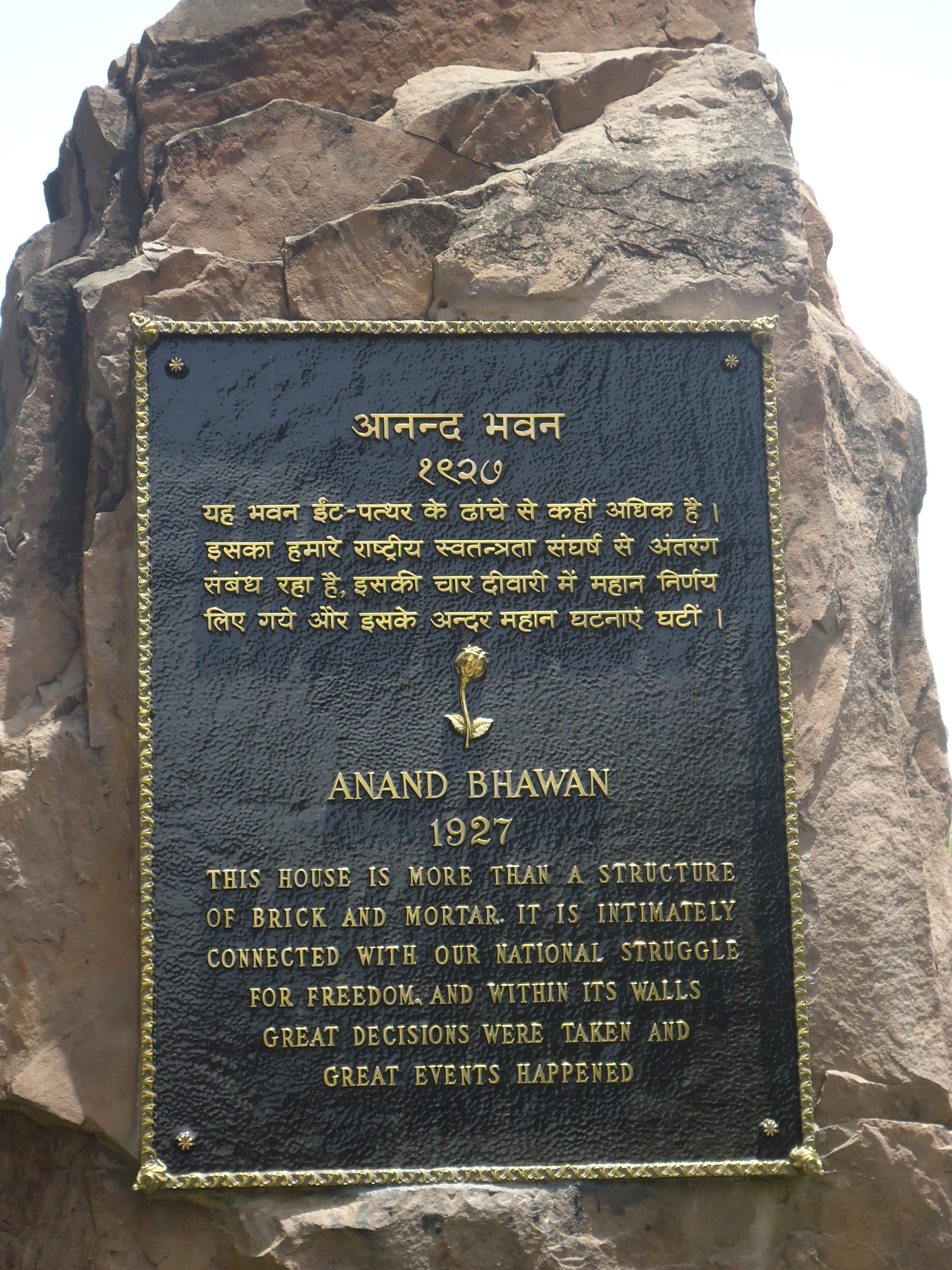
At the entrance of Anand Bhavan

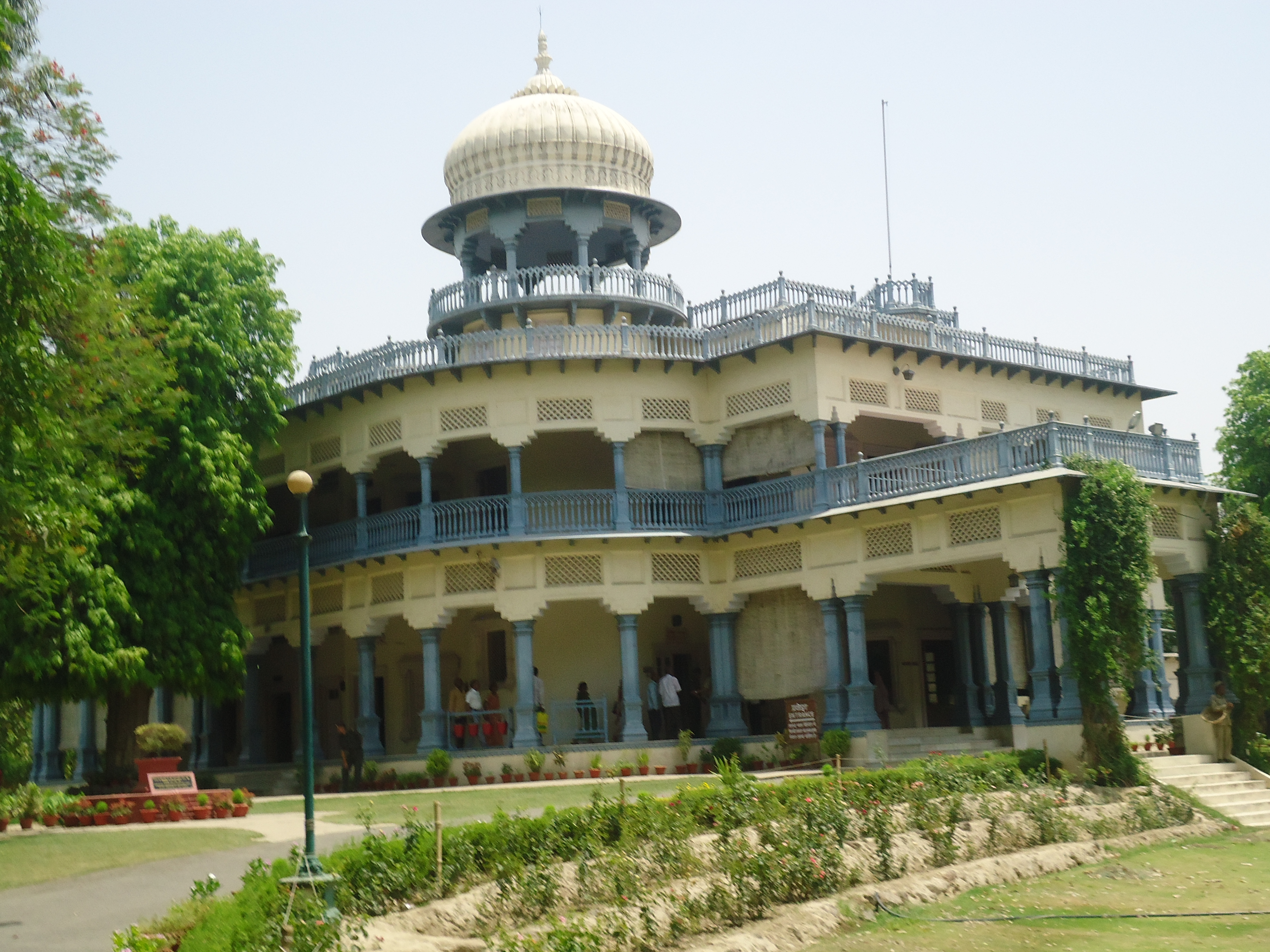
General view

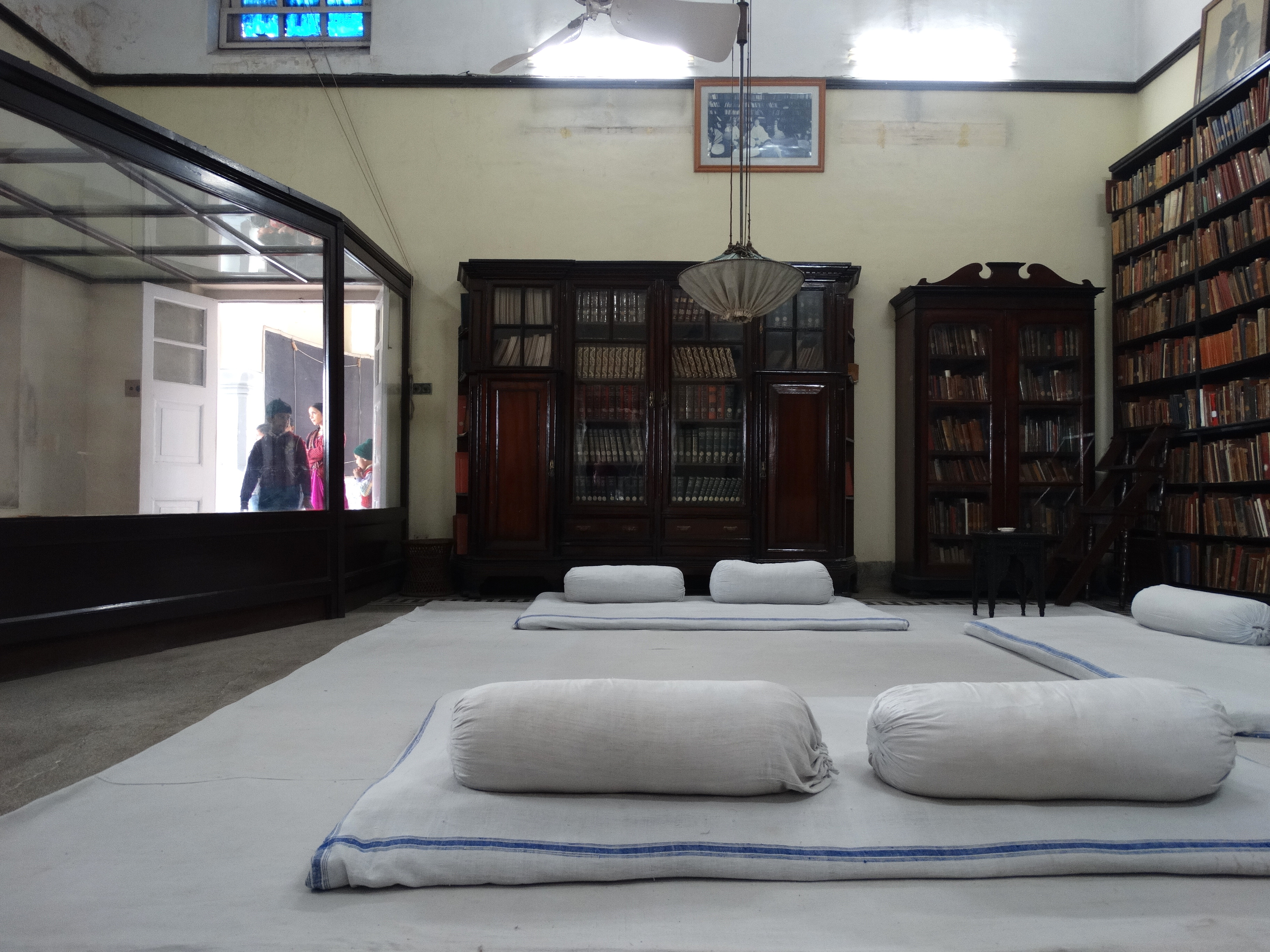
Room where Congress meetings were held

== See also ==
- List of tourist attractions in Prayagraj
- List of museums in India
