= Prayagraj Clock Tower =

Clock tower in Uttar Pradesh, India

- Hindi- Chowk Ghantaghar
- Location: Prayagraj
- Type: Clock Tower
- Height: 30 feet (9.1 m)
- Opening date: 1913

Prayagraj Clock Tower is a clock tower located in Prayagraj, Uttar Pradesh, India, also known as Chowk Ghantaghar.

It was built in 1913.

== History ==
It is located in the centre of the Chowk, Prayagraj, which is one of oldest markets in India and is an example of the artistic and structural skills of Mughals. Built in the year 1913, it is one of the oldest clock tower in India.

== See also ==
- List of clock towers in India
