= Jade terrapin from Allahabad =

Mughal jade terrapin sculpture

Jade terrapin
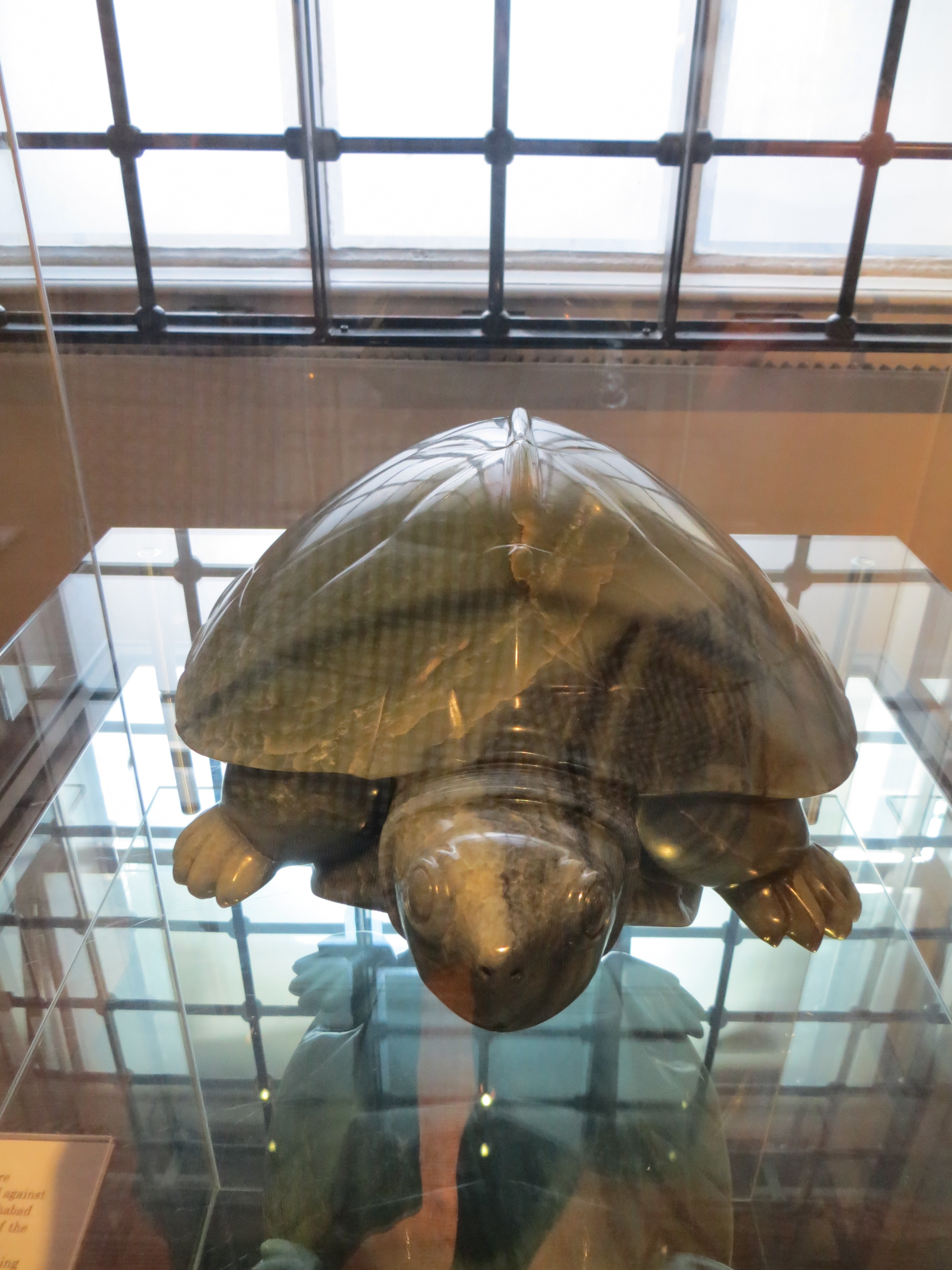
- On display at the British Museum
- Material: Carved jade
- Size: 20 cm high, 48.5 cm long and 32 cm wide
- Weight: 41 kg
- Created: 17th century AD
- Present location: British Museum, London
- Registration: ME OA 1830,612.1

The Jade terrapin from Allahabad is a large sculpture of a terrapin carved from a single piece of jade. Dating from the early 17th century, when most of India was ruled by the Mughal dynasty, this luxurious and unique artefact was taken from Allahabad to England in the early 19th century.

== Description ==
This massive object of precious stone was carved from one large piece of jade in the 17th century for the court of the Mughal Emperor Jahangir. The terrapin has been very realistically portrayed, so much so that scientists have proposed that it is modelled on a female of the Kachuga dhongoka species of turtle. Jahangir established a royal court at Allahabad between 1605 and 1627. The terrapin was probably made during this period as a decorative ornament for one of the landscaped pools in the palace gardens.

== Discovery and ownership ==
The jade sculpture was accidentally found at the bottom of a well during engineering excavations in Allahabad in 1803. Its artistic skill and value were immediately recognised by its excavators and the object was soon afterwards removed to England by Lieutenant General Alexander Kyd of the Bengal Engineers. A relative of the Kyd family, Lieutenant Thomas Wilkinson, subsequently bequeathed it to the British Museum in 1830.

== Gallery ==
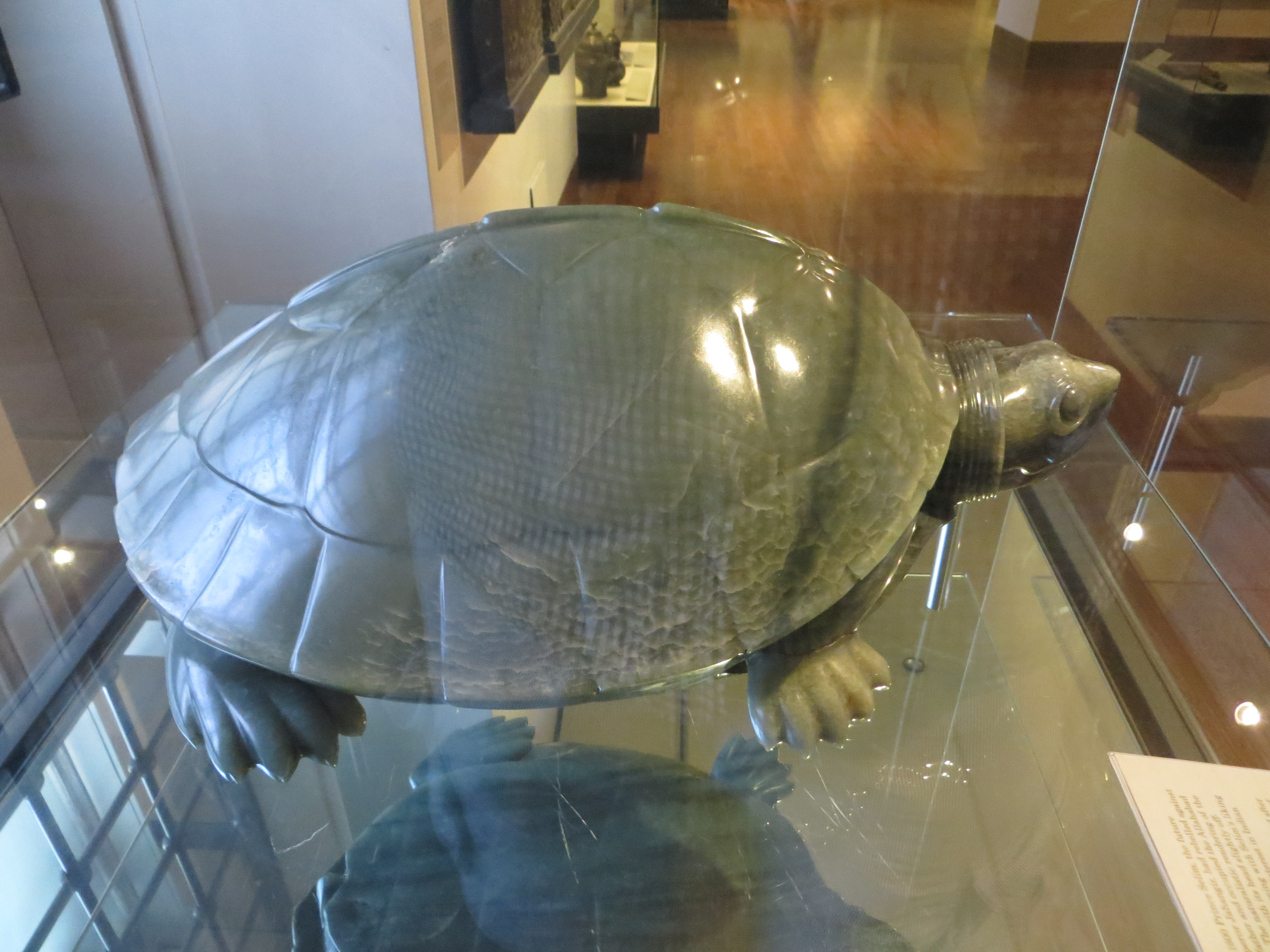
Side view
