= Chandra Shekhar Azad Park =

Park in Prayagraj, Uttar Pradesh, India

Chandrashekhar Azad Park
- Alfred Park
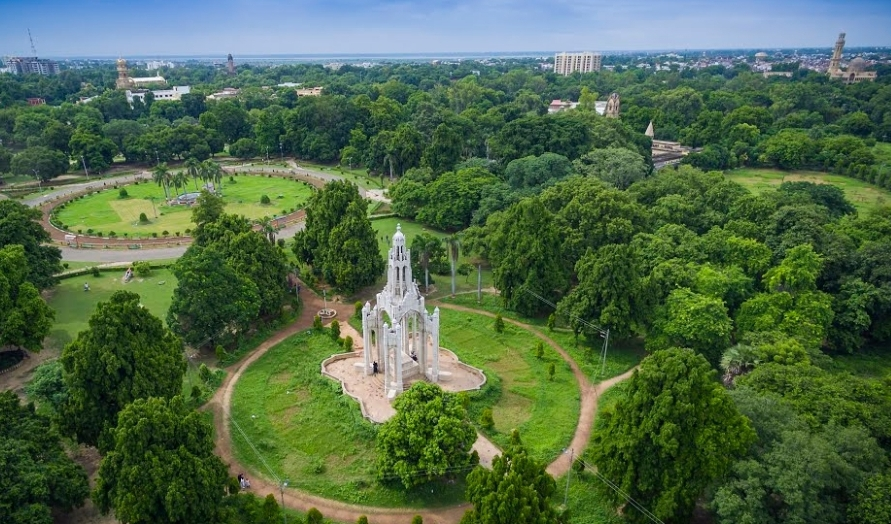
- Victoria Memorial
- Interactive map of Chandrashekhar Azad Park
- Type: Public park
- Location: Georgetown in Prayagraj, Uttar Pradesh, India
- Coordinates: 25°27′14″N 81°50′53″E
- Area: 54 hectares
- Established: 1870
- Operator: Government of Uttar Pradesh
- Status: Open all year

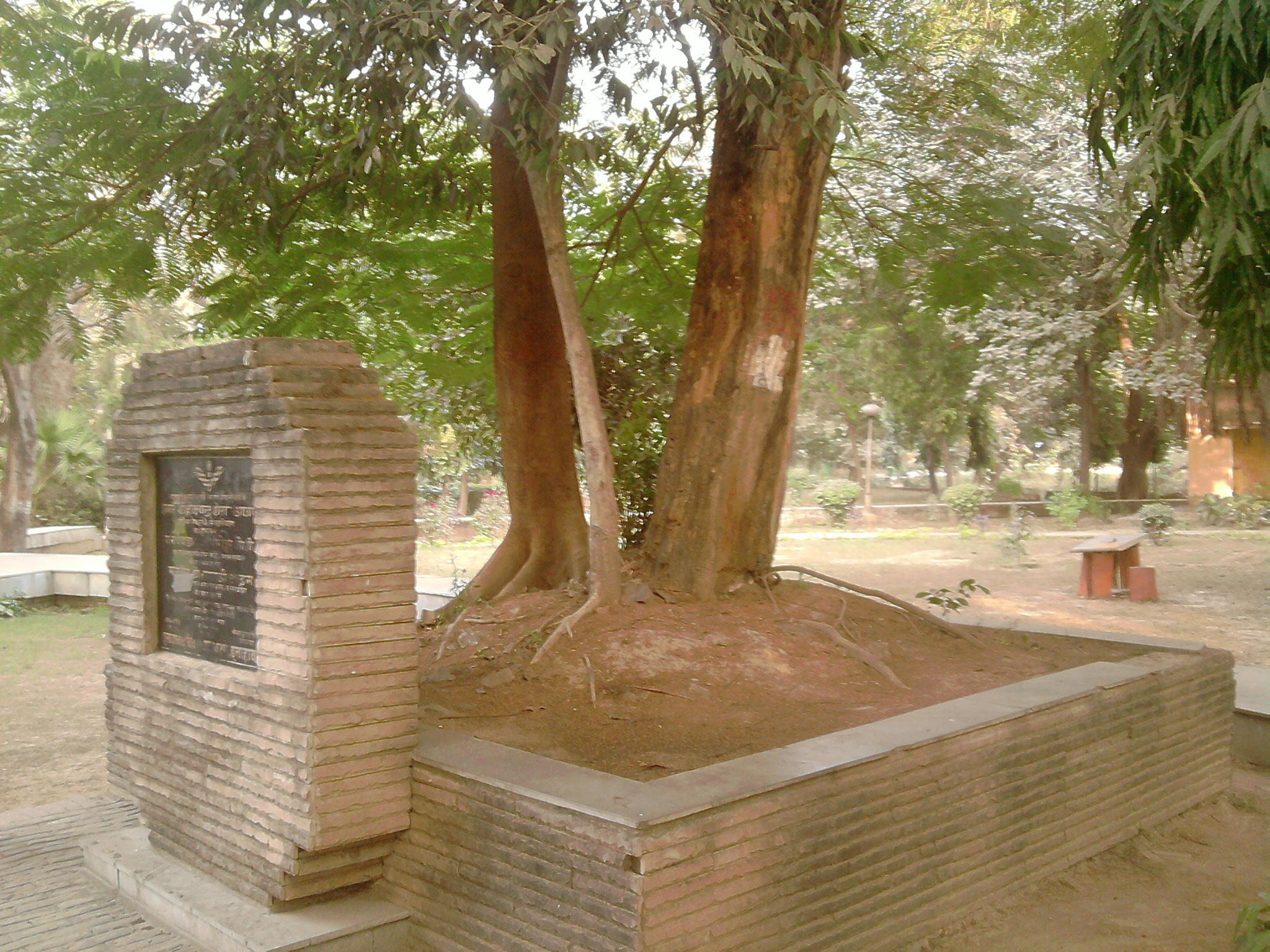
Chandra Shekhar Azad Memorial

Chandra Shekhar Azad Park, also known by its former official name Alfred Park, and also Company Bagh during the Company Raj, is a public park in Prayagraj, Uttar Pradesh, India. Built in 1870 to mark Prince Alfred's visit to the city, with an area of 54 hectares, it is the biggest park in Prayagraj. It was renamed by the Uttar Pradesh Government after revolutionary Chandra Shekhar Azad, who sacrificed his life here during the Indian independence movement in 1931.

== History ==
In 1870, old cantonments were transformed into a park when, after the Rebellion of 1857, new areas were developed.

== Location ==
The park is in the Georgetown neighborhood and is surrounded by Tagoretown, Civil Lines and the University of Allahabad. Its coordinates are 25°27′9″N 80°50′51″E.

== Landmarks ==
It has some important heritage and recreational sites.

- Chandra Shekhar Azad Memorial, where Azad sacrificed his life
- Victoria Memorial. Large canopy made of Italian limestone, dedicated to Queen Victoria. It was opened on 24 March 1906 by James Digges La Touche. The canopy once sheltered a huge statue of Queen Victoria which was later removed.
- Prayag Sangeet Samiti, a music training institute
- Madan Mohan Malviya Stadium
- Allahabad Museum
- Allahabad Public Library

Being the biggest park, it attracts a large number of people. according to an estimate, approximately 5000 people visit this park in duration of 4:00 a.m. to 8:00 p.m.

== See also ==
- List of tourist attractions in Prayagraj
