= Allahabad Public Library =

Library in Prayagraj, India

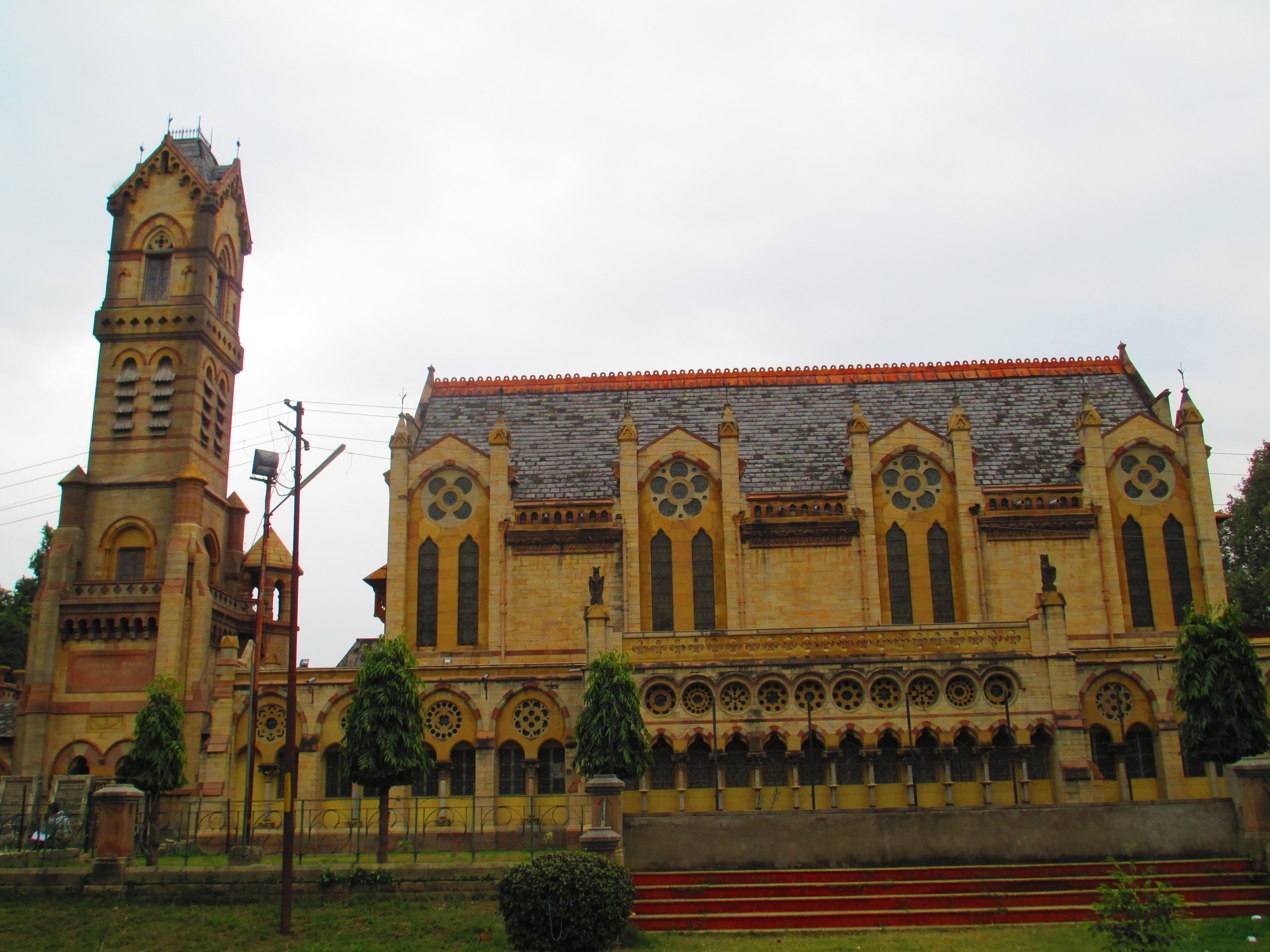
- 25.4557596855282°N 81.84941995931914°E
- Location: Prayagraj, Uttar Pradesh, India
- Type: Public library
- Established: 1864

Collection
- Size: approx. 125,000 books, 40 magazines and 28 newspapers

Access and use
- Population served: 55,100 reader inclusive of 1,271 membership (2013-14)

Other information
- Website: agplib.org

Allahabad Public Library, also known as Thornhill Mayne Memorial, is a public library situated at Chandrashekhar Azad Park in Prayagraj, India.

== History ==
Established in 1864, it is the biggest library in the state of Uttar Pradesh. The building was designed by Richard Roskell Bayne and is considered a remarkable example of Scottish Baronial Revival architecture. The monument served as the house of legislative assembly in the British Raj when Allahabad was the capital of the United Provinces. In 1879, the Public library was shifted to the present premises at Chandrashekhar Azad Park.

== Holdings ==
The library has an approximate collection of 125,000 books, 40 types of magazines, and 28 different newspapers in Hindi, English, Urdu and Bangla and it also contains 21 Arabic manuscripts. It also has a collection of old government publications, parliamentary papers, and blue books of the 19th century, and old manuscripts and journals.

== Building ==
The building known as Thornhill Mayne Memorial is situated at Alfred Park and was designed by Richard Roskell Bayne in Scottish Baronial architecture with sharp pillars and turrets of granite and sandstone. It represents structural polychromy with lofty towers and arcaded cloisters. When completed in 1870, the building cost approximately INR 94,222. It was funded by Commissioner of Allahabad, Mr. Mayne and was opened as a memorial to Cuthbert Bensley Thornhill.

== Gallery ==
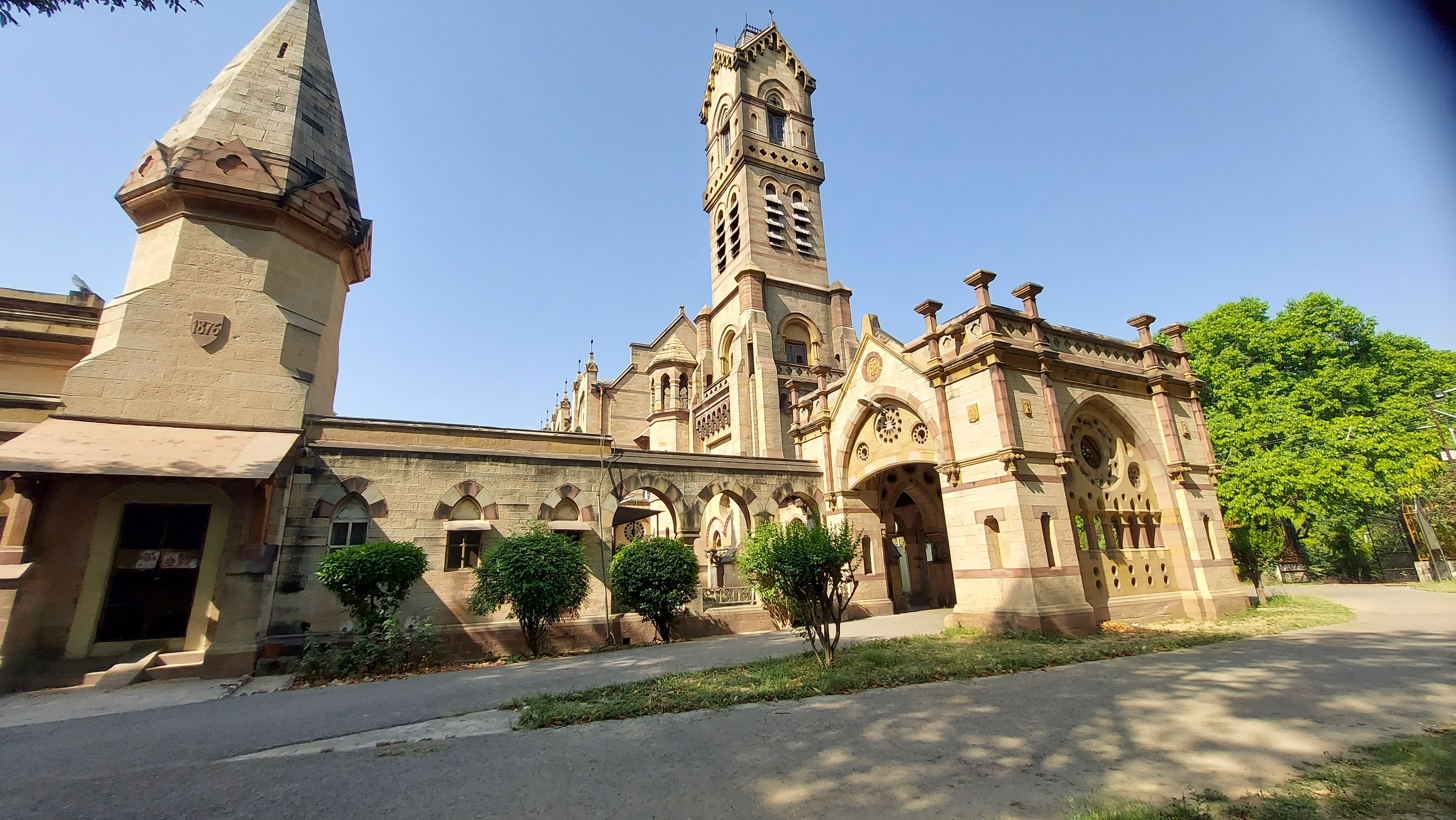
Allahabad Public Library, Prayagraj

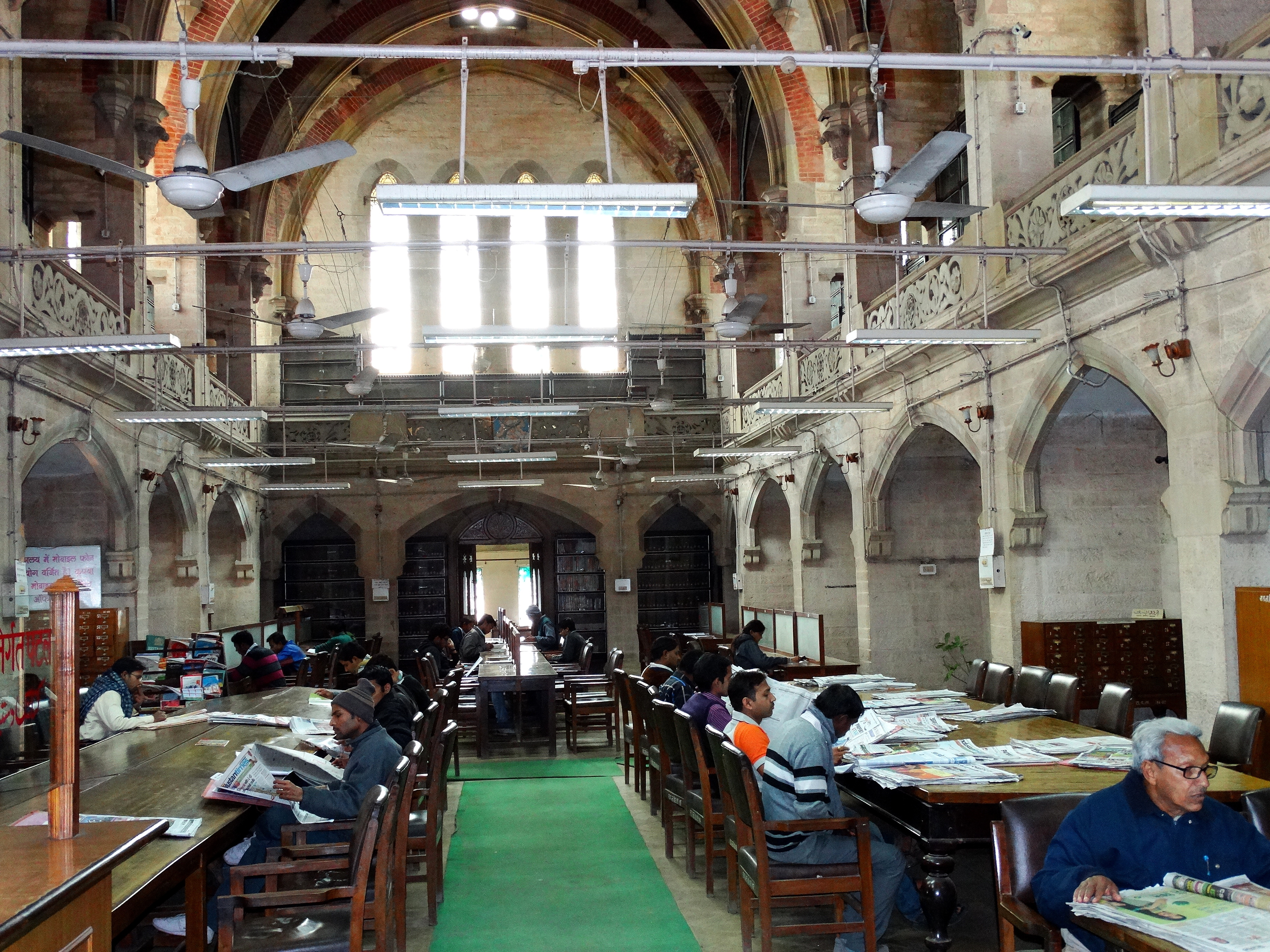
Interior of Allahabad Public Library

== See also ==
- List of tourist attractions in Prayagraj
- List of libraries in India
