= Neighbourhoods of Prayagraj =

Areas in a metropolis in Uttar Pradesh, India

The Old Allahabad City, at the south of Prayagraj Junction Railway Station, consists of neighborhoods like Chowk, Johnstongunj, Dariyabad, and Khuldabad. and was in existence from the time of Akbar. Some magnificent structures erected in this era include the Khusro Bagh and the Allahabad Fort. North of Prayagraj Junction railway station, the New Prayagraj City consists of neighborhoods like Lukergunj, Civil Lines, Georgetown, Tagoretown, Bharadwaj Puram, Ashok Nagar, and Mumfordgunj, which are relatively new and were built during British rule. These neighborhoods reflect British architecture like the All Saints Cathedral, Alfred Park and Allahabad High Court. Newer residential areas include neighborhoods like Kareli and suburbs like Naini, Jhunsi and Manauri bajar.

== Allengunj ==
Allengunj is located close to Prayag Junction railway station. It has a staff selection board office.

== Alopibagh ==
Alopibagh is a locality/township of Prayagraj, Uttar Pradesh, India. The locality is close to the Kumbh Mela area, the Sangam, the rivers Ganges and Yamuna, and one of the most ancient Hindu temples of India, the Alopi Devi Mandir, is also in this locality. Alopibagh is adjacent to Daraganj, the oldest suburb of Prayagraj and the most important bathing Ghat on the bank of Ganges.

== Bairahana ==
Bairahana is further divided into two localities:New Bairahana and the Old Bairahana. Near Bairahana chauraha is a medieval cemetery also called the "Gora Kabristan", where the dead bodies of British soldiers killed during 1857 revolt were buried.

== Benigunj ==
Benigunj is situated near the railway station.

== Bharadwaj Puram ==
Bharadwaj Puram is a neighborhood in central Prayagraj. It is in between Tagore Town and Daraganj. It is near the major commercial centers of the city such as Katra and Civil Lines. There is a market within Bharadwaj Puram on the Matiyara road. There are several schools, hospitals, parks as well in this neighborhood.

== Chowk ==
Chowk is the historic city centre of the Old Prayagraj city. It is situated at the southern part of Prayagraj Municipal Council. Chowk serves as a traditional bazaar with the Grand Trunk Road running through the centre of it. Chowk is a historical point, where once stood the Neem tree where numerous freedom fighters were hanged in the first Indian War of Independence.

== Civil Lines ==
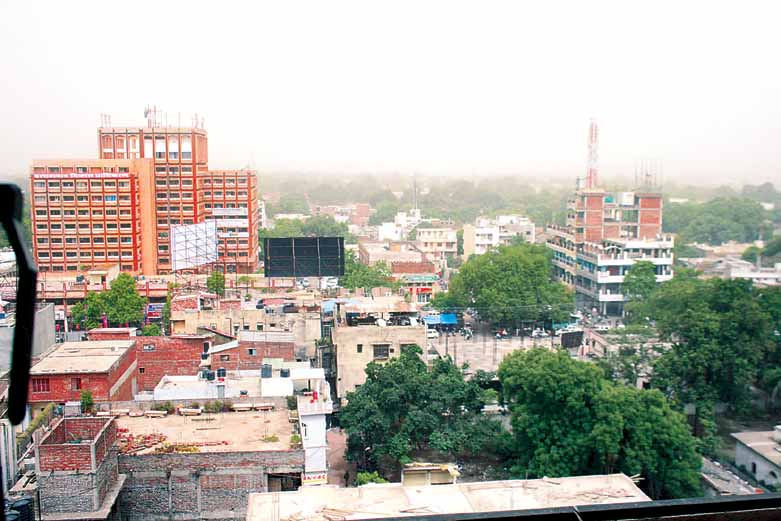
Prayagraj city from Civil Lines

Formerly known as Cannington and Canning Town, it is the central business district of Prayagraj and is famous for its urban setting, gridiron plan roads and high rise buildings. Built in 1857, under the supervision of Cuthbert Bensley Thornhill, when around 600 Meo people were massacred by the British people in India for their alliance with the Indian Independence Movement activists and eight villages were seized to form a new township., it was the largest town-planning project carried out in India before the establishment of New Delhi.

== Darbhanga ==
On one side of Darbhanga is Yamuna river, and on the other side Mirapur.

== Georgetown ==
Georgetown is a neighborhood of Prayagraj, India. It is a residential area in the central part of the city mainly occupied by the white collar workers, doctors and advocates. It also houses a large number of hospitals and clinics. Georgetown is famous for its affluent surroundings and apartments. It is bordered by Kamla Nehru Road in the west, Thornhill Road, MG Marg in the south and Tagoretown in the west. Notable landmarks located in and near the neighborhood are Alfred Park and Lowther Castle.

== Kareli ==
Kareli (officially known as Kareli Scheme) is a residential neighborhood of Prayagraj. Developed by Awas Vikas in 1979, it was one of the biggest planned neighborhoods in India. The neighborhood is sub divided into neighborhoods like GTB Nagar, Gaus Nagar, Shams Nagar and Rehmat Nagar Colony. Kareli is the second largest colony of India in terms of Area and is one of the most expensive residential localities of Prayagraj. It is also known as Officer's colony by the localas as the large number of people who served as government servants like IAS, IPS, PCS, etc inhabited the place.The neighborhood was predominately occupied by the members of the mercantile middle class of Meerapur and Attarsuiya, and white collar workers from several public sector undertakings and private companies established in the new industrial region of Naini. It was later overwhelmed by a richer population after the oil boom and privatization. However it is not mintained well. The roads have so many mudhols & potholes as well as lack of attention from development authorities.

== Lukergunj ==
Lukergunj is a posh residential area famous for its Victorian era bungalows and high-rise apartments. Lukergunj, well known for its clubbing culture, was once predominantly occupied by British and Anglo Indians. It is situated one kilometer south west from the Prayagraj Junction Railway Station.

== Meerapur ==
Meerapur is a neighborhood/locality in Prayagraj. It is mainly famous for eateries as there are many sweet shops and markets for visitors. Old temples and mosques are the main attraction. Meerapur is surrounded by the Yamuna river from one side near Bargad Ghat.

== Meergunj ==
This neighborhood is the infamously claimed red-light district of the city. Apart from that it is also a densely populated residential area and a marketplace. It is located near Chowk.

== Myorabad ==
Myorabad is a neighborhood of Prayagraj, Uttar Pradesh, India.

== South Malaka ==
South Malaka is a locality/township of Prayagraj, Uttar Pradesh, India. It is close to the railway track connecting Prayagraj to Varanasi and Gorakhpur. The other important institutions in the locality are Government Inter College and U.P.Government Central Library.

== Suburbs of Prayagraj ==
- Manauri bajar
- Bamrauli
- Jhalwa
- Jhunsi
- Phaphamau
- Saidabad
- Sulem Sarai
