= Darbhanga, Prayagraj =

Neighbourhood of Prayagraj

Darbhanga
- Neighbourhood
- Interactive map of Darbhanga
- Coordinates: 25°27′11.25″N 81°51′23.71″E
- Country: India
- State: Uttar Pradesh
- City: Prayagraj

Government
  - Body: Prayagraj Municipal Corporation

Darbhanga Colony (formerly known as Darbhanga Castle or Lowther Estate) is a posh central neighborhood in Prayagraj, India. It was formerly owned by the royal family of Darbhanga. It still houses the Lowther Castle in the colony. Darbhanga Colony played important a role in Independence movement of India as the Fourth and Eighth annual convention of Indian National Congress was held in here.

== Location ==
With its central location in the city it as bordered by Georgetown. Other locations in Prayagraj are at optimum distance from it such as the Civil Lines, Colonelgunj, Rambagh, etc.

== Culture ==
Durga Puja celebrations organized by the Darbhanga Colony Puja Committee is one of the best organized events in Prayagraj attracting lakhs of devotees.

== Darbhanga Castle ==
Darbhanga Castle (also known as Lowther Castle) was the residential building of the then Maharaja of Darbhanga, Maharaja Lakshmeshwar Singh. He purchased a large property known as Lowther Castle and allowed Indian National Congress to hold its convention there. This property was renamed as Darbhanga Castle. Again, in the year 1892, the annual convention of Indian National Congress was held in Darbhanga Castle. The annual convention of Congress of 1892 was held on 28 December 1892 at the extensive grounds of Darbhanga Castle, now known as Darbhanga Colony. It was later donated to Government of India after independence and Darbhanga House was constructed.
