= Georgetown, Prayagraj =

Coordinates: 25°27′N 81°51′E

George Town
- Neighbourhood of Prayagraj
- Interactive map of George Town

Government
  - Body: Prayagraj Municipal Corporation

George Town is an upper-class neighbourhood locality in Prayagraj, India. Built in 1901, it is a residential area in the central part of the city mainly occupied by the white collar workers. It also houses a large number of hospitals and clinics. Georgetown is famous for is affluent surroundings and apartments. It is bordered by Kamla Nehru Road in the west, Thornhill Road, MG Marg in the south and Tagoretown in the west. Park Road, Lowther Road and Hamilton Road runs through the neighborhood.

Notable landmarks located in and near the neighborhood are Chandrashekhar Azad Park and Darbhanga, Prayagraj.
