= List of churches in Prayagraj =

Prayagraj is home to some richly ornate and historically significant churches. As of 2012, the city has at least 14 churches that pay tribute to colonial, neo-colonial, Indian, Roman, Greek and modern architectural designs. Most of the notable churches, cathedrals and chapels in the city were built after 1840, many of which are built in the east-west direction with only a few exceptions.

== List ==
- Allahabad Pentecostal Church - Built of stones and red bricks in 1840, it was the first church in the city to be built on a rented property.
- All Saints' Cathedral - Built in 1871 AD by British architect Sir William Emerson, it is a noted Anglican Cathedral located in Prayagraj. It is an example of 13th-century Gothic style. The Cathedral also houses many plaques which depict the death of different British nationals for a variety of reasons during their rule in India.
- Chowk Church - Chowk church was established in 1840.
- Holy Trinity Church - Built in 1839 by Lieutenant Sharp is the second oldest church in Prayagraj (after Union Church, built in 1818). It was designed by Major Smith in Colonial Gothic architecture and stands on eight pillars, each measuring 125 feet by 70 feet. It is modeled on the church of St Martin-in-the-Fields in London. The church was consecrated by Bishop Daniel Wilson on 19 February 1841. The church stands on eight pillars, each measuring 125 feet by 70 feet. The building also stores memorials from the Gwalior campaign and the Sepoy Mutiny of 1857.
- Methodist Church - Also known as Lal Girja for its red brick structure, the church is built in Indo-Roman style.
- St. John's Church
- St. Joseph's Cathedral - St. Joseph's Cathedral is the cathedral of the Roman Catholic Diocese of Prayagraj, in Prayagraj, India. Built in 1879, the cathedral represents a fine example of Italian architecture. It is said that the craftsmen and materials were brought from Italy.
- St. Patrick's Church - Built in 1907, it is a Roman Catholic church.
- St. Paul's Church - Constructed in 1856, the church served as a school till 1881, when it was granted the status of a church by England. It has eight pillars in its facade and a high roof of stone slabs with a tin shed and wooden pillars under an iron net.
- St. Peter's Church - St. Peter's Church was established in 1842.
- St. Thomas Orthodox Syrian Church - Consecrated on 8 February 1889 by then Bishop of Calcutta Ralph Johnson and built by Horace Barnet, the church, in 1897 was dedicated to Queen Victoria.
- Union Church - Built in 1818, in Civil Lines, this is the oldest church in Prayagraj. "Union Churches" were built all around India during British colonial times, initially for British officers to use. Nowadays, it is the home of "Yeshu Darbar North" - the first branch church of Prayagraj's "Yeshu Darbar" in Naini.
- Yeshu Darbar - In 2001, a small Bible study became a large, open-air meeting held weekly in Naini, Prayagraj (just south of the Yamuna). Thousands attend services every week, some coming from the villages on Friday, staying for Saturday and Sunday services, and heading back to the villages on Monday. Large emphasis on healing ministry. Congregation found on the SHUATS campus ("Sam Higginbottom University of Agriculture, Technology, & Sciences," commonly simply called "Agricultural Institute"); website at https://web.archive.org/web/20160331052721/http://shiats.edu.in/yDarbar/yDarbar.asp
