= Boys High =

Boys High may refer to:

- Boys High School (Brooklyn), Brooklyn, New York, United States
- Boys' High School & College (Allahabad, Uttar Pradesh), Allahabad, India
- Pretoria Boys High School, Brooklyn, Pretoria, South Africa
