= Ram Bagh =

Ram Bagh may refer to the following places:

- Aram Bagh, Agra, a Mughal garden near the Taj Mahal
- Aram Bagh, Karachi, locality in Karachi, Sindh, Pakistan, formerly and colloquially called Ram Bagh
- Ram Bagh, Amritsar, garden and palace in Amritsar, Punjab, India
- Rambagh, Allahabad, locality in Allahabad, Uttar Pradesh, India
- Rambagh Palace, Jaipur, palace turned hotel in Jaipur, Rajasthan, India
