= St. Joseph's Cathedral, Prayagraj =

Church in Uttar Pradesh, India

Cathedral of St Joseph
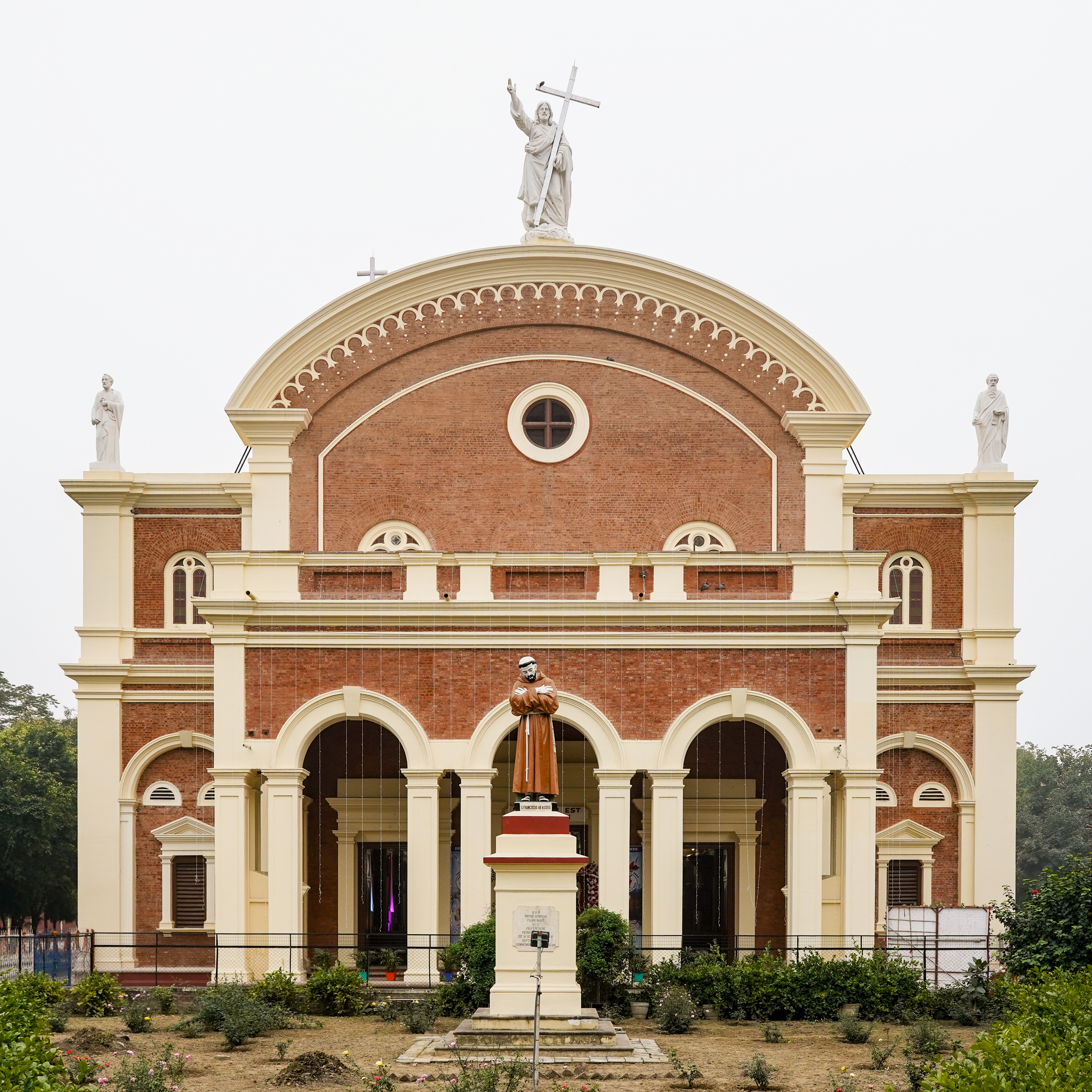
- Front facade
- Cathedral of St Joseph
- 25.4575°N 81.8444°E
- Location: 32, Thornhill Road, Prayagraj, Uttar Pradesh 211 002
- Country: India
- Denomination: Roman Catholic
- Website: www.dioceseofallahabad.org

History
- Status: Cathedral
- Founded: 1879; 147 years ago
- Dedication: Saint Joseph

Architecture
- Functional status: Active

Administration
- Diocese: Diocese of Prayagraj

Clergy
- Archbishop: Most. Rev. Raphy Manjaly
- Bishop: Vacant

St. Joseph's Cathedral is the cathedral of the Roman Catholic Diocese of Prayagraj, in Prayagraj (formerly Allahabad), in the state of Uttar Pradesh in North India. Built in 1879, the cathedral represents a fine example of Italian architecture. It is said that the craftsmen and materials were brought from Italy.

== Gallery ==
=== Exterior views ===
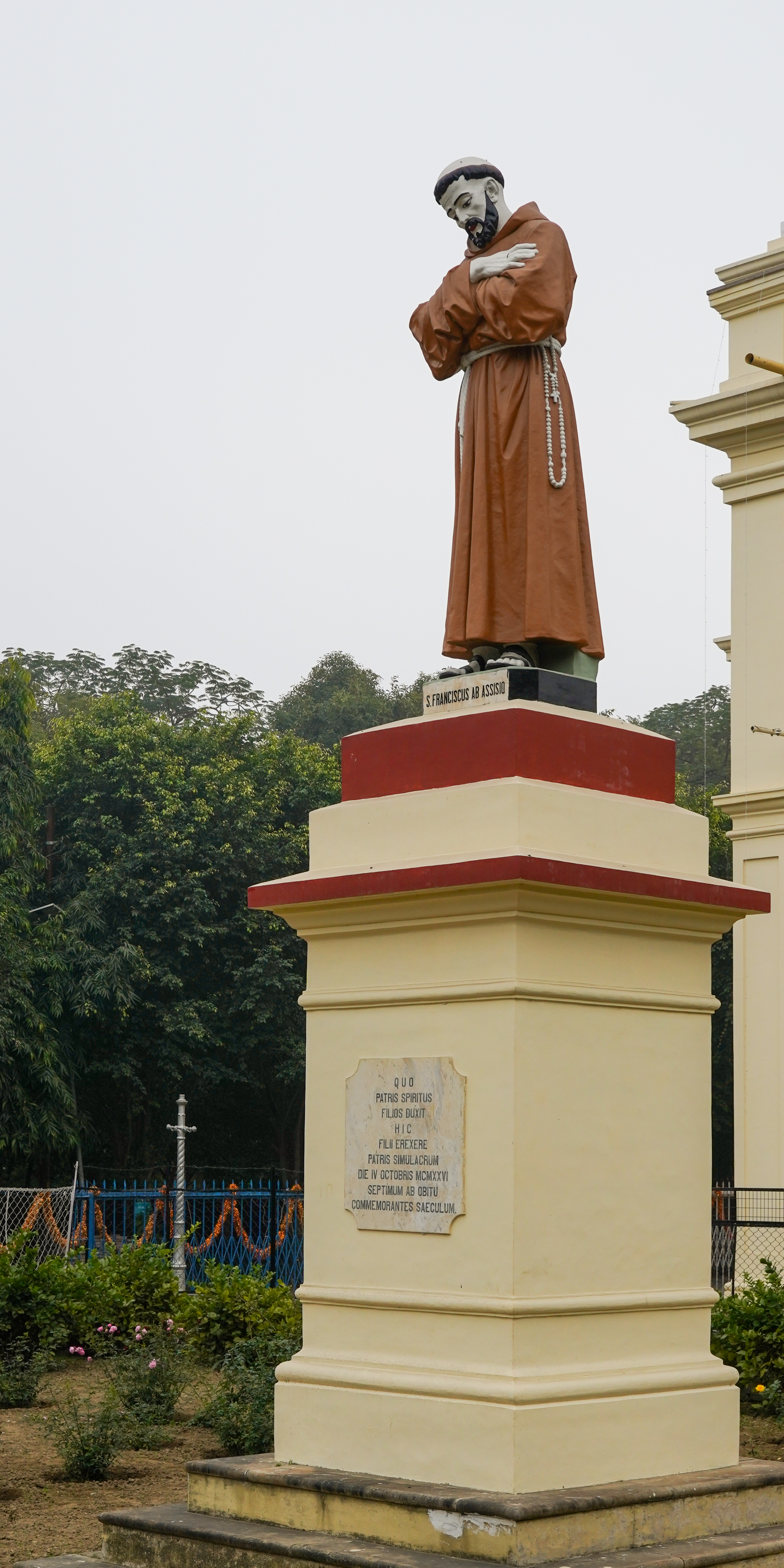
St. Francis of Assisi statue in front

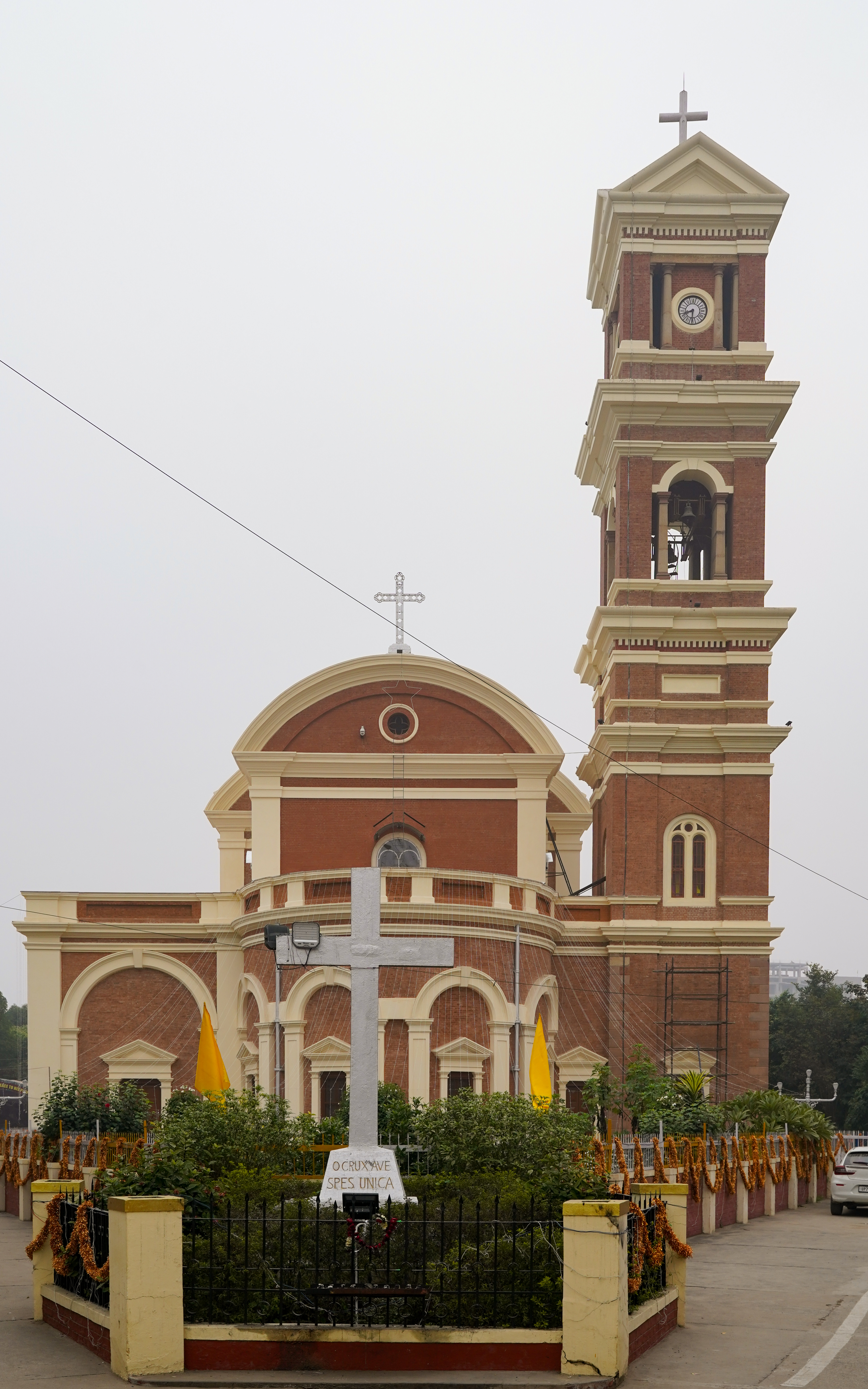
Rear of the Cathedral with bell tower

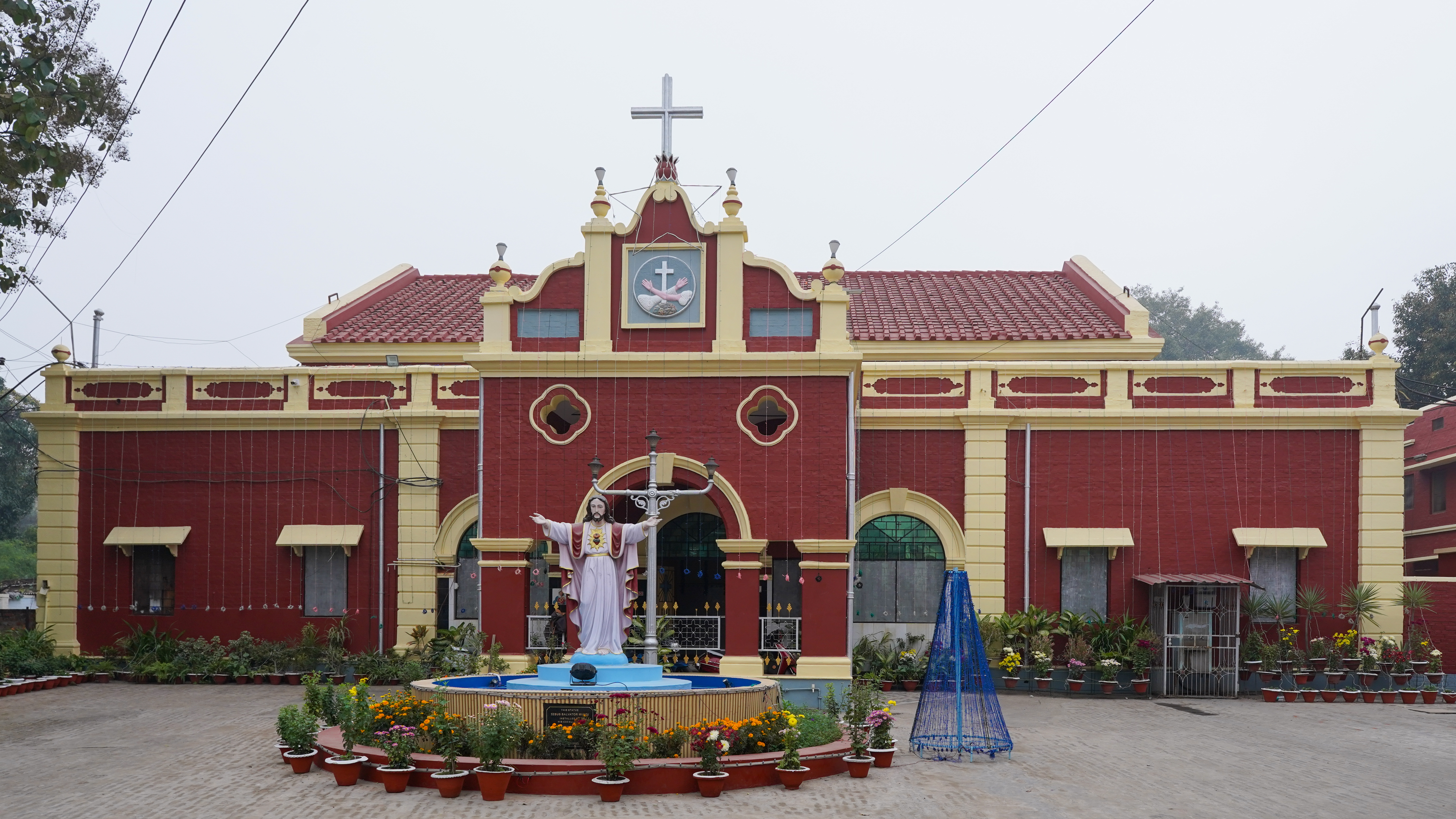
Parish house

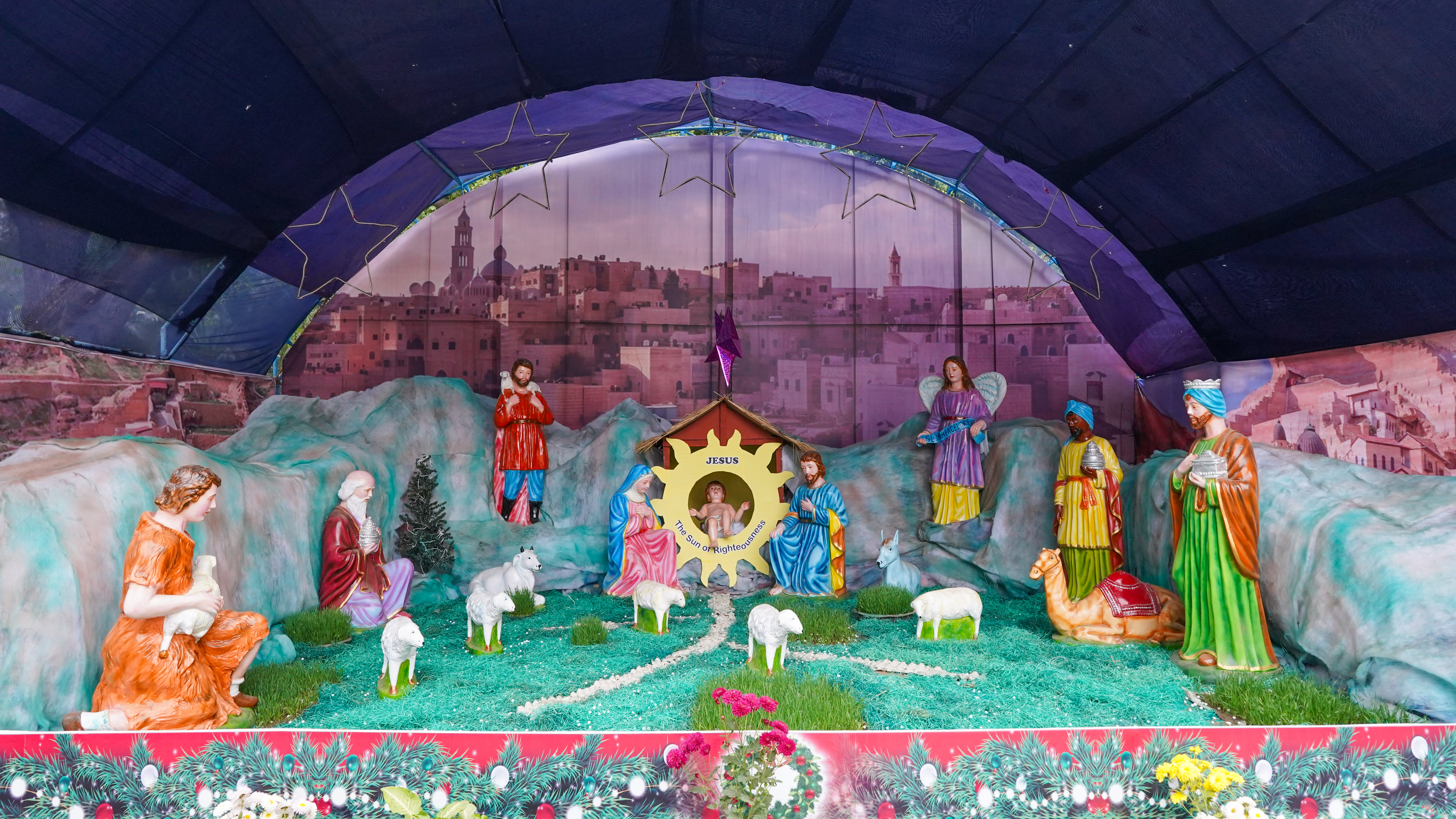
Christmas manger, ca. Dec 2023

=== Interior views ===
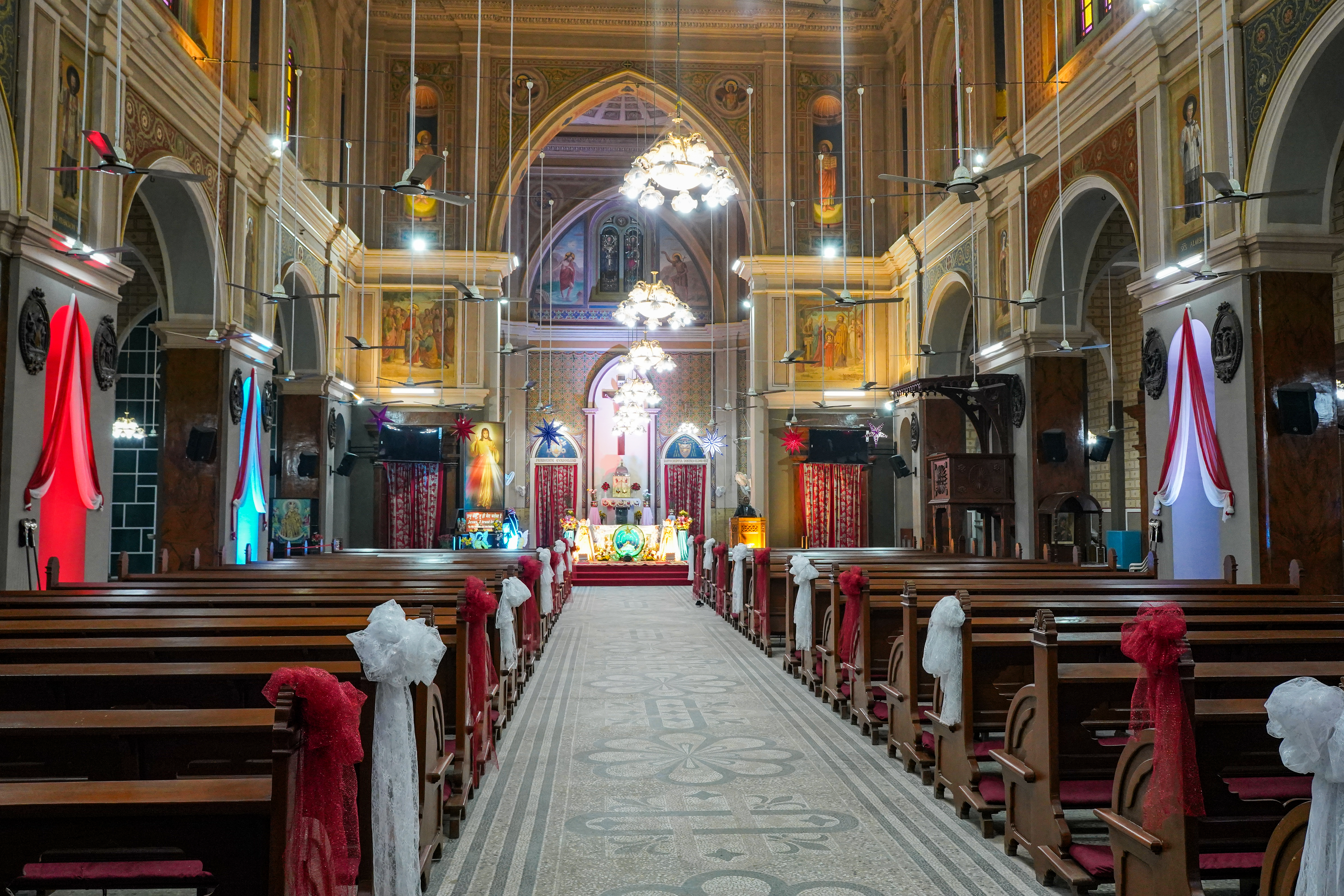
Nave and main altar, ca. Dec 2023

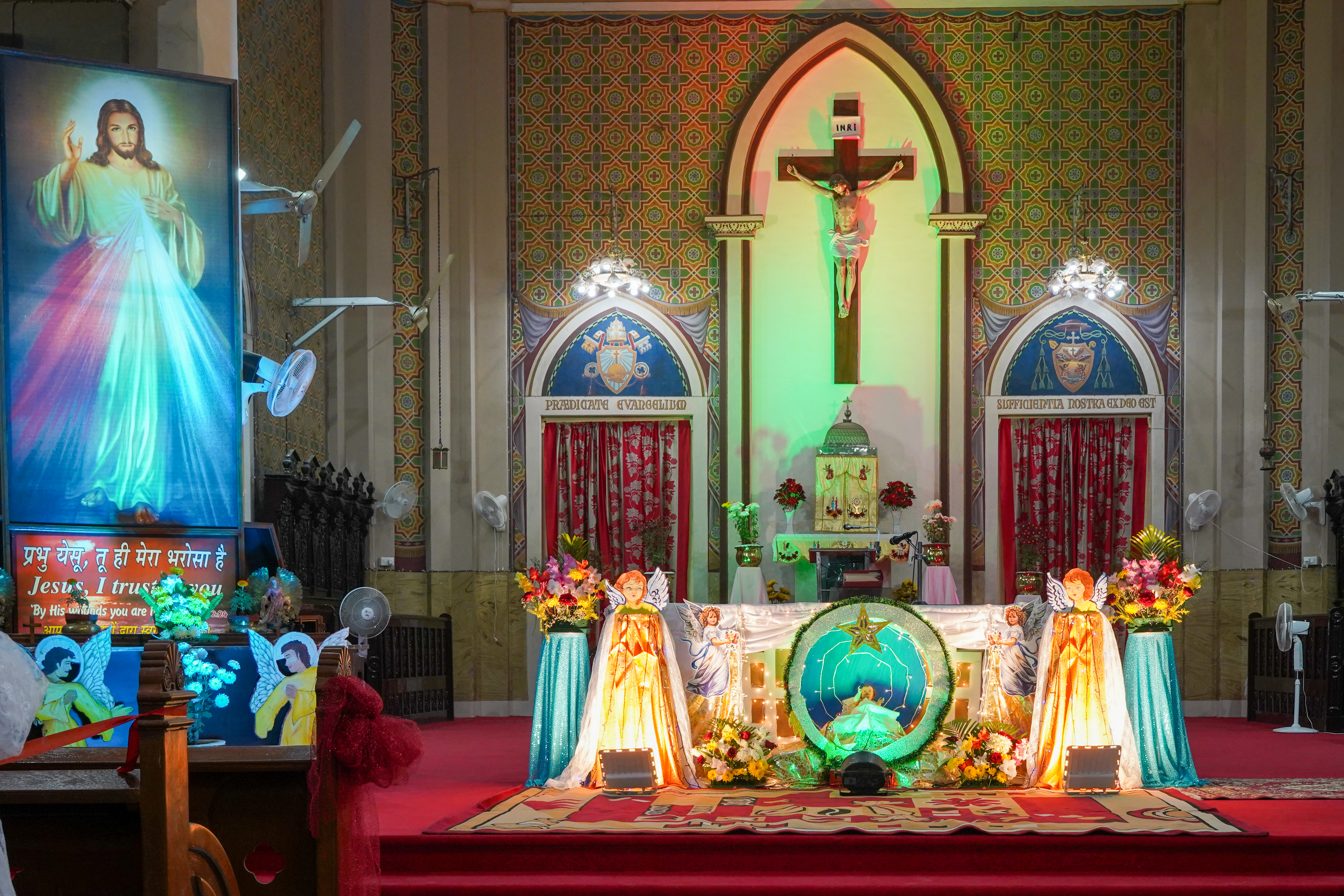
Main altar with Christmas decoration, ca. Dec 2023

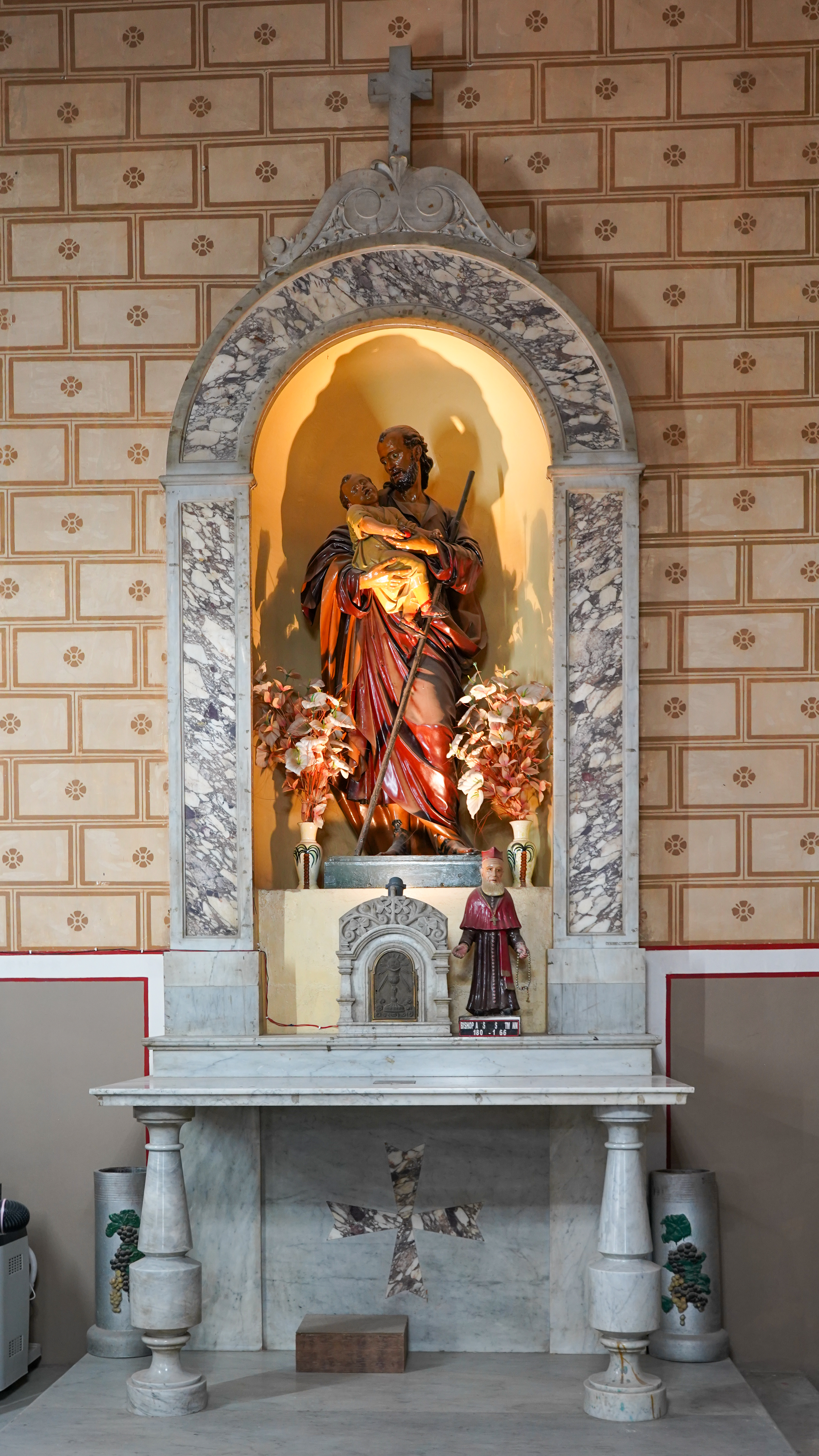
Right side altar

== See also ==
- All Saints Cathedral
- List of churches in Prayagraj
