= Lakshmi Raj Sharma =

Indian author, novelist, and academician (born 1954)

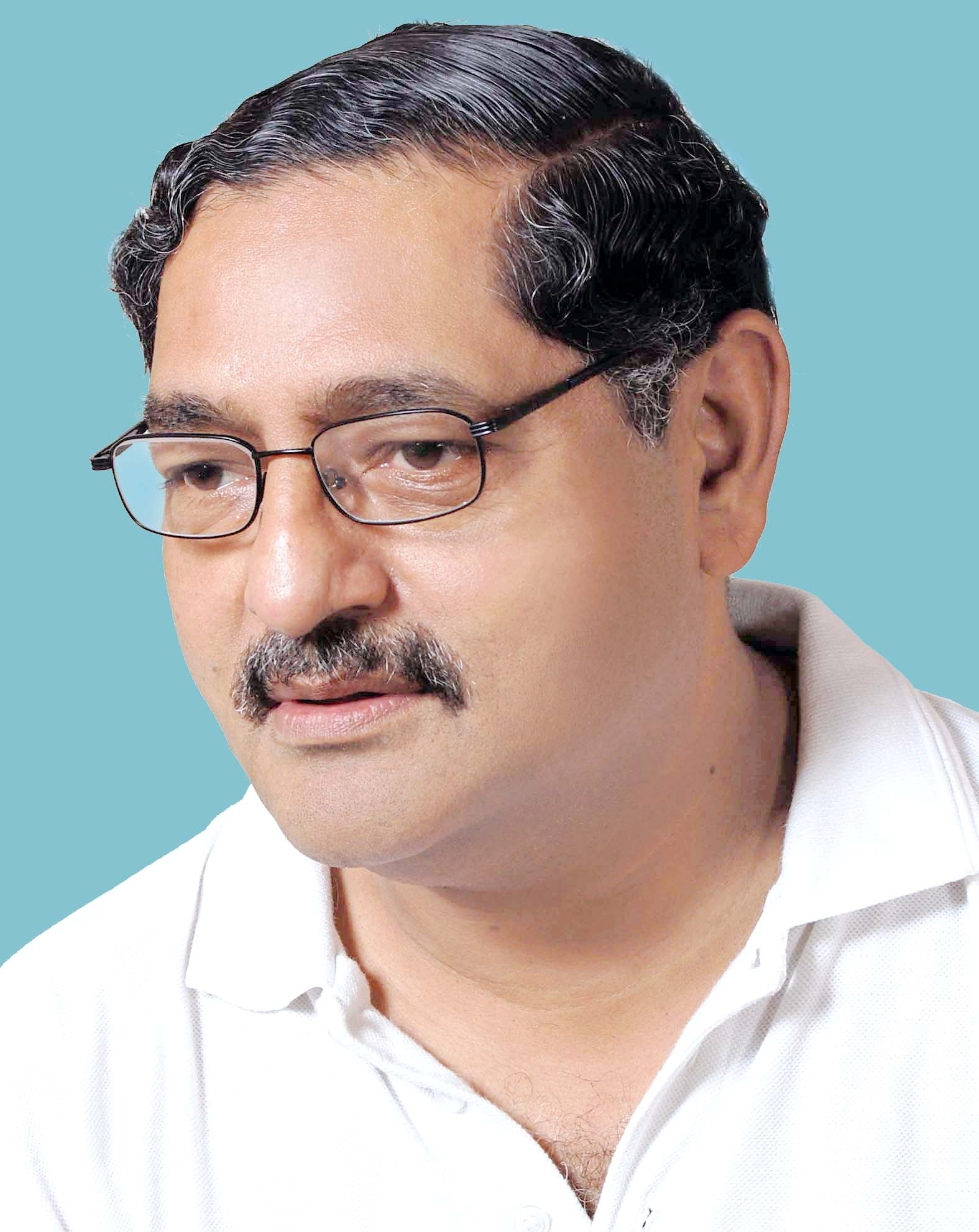
- Lakshmi Raj Sharma
- Born: 1954 (age 71–72); Mirzapur, UP, India
- Education: MA, PhD
- Alma mater: University of Allahabad
- Occupations: Academician, Novelist
- Spouse: Bandana Sharma
- Writing career
- Language: English, Hindi
- Genres: Literary Fiction, Short Stories, and Literary Theory
- Notable works: The Tailor's Needle, Marriages are Made in India, TS Eliot-Middleton Murry Debate, The Twain Shall Meet
- Website: www.lakshmirajsharma.in

Lakshmi Raj Sharma (born 1954) is an Indian author, novelist, and academician. He used to teach English literature and literary theory. He was Professor at the Department of English and Modern European Languages at the University of Allahabad, Allahabad. Recently his novel The Tailor's Needle was published. A few other books are also to his credit. He is also an active blogger.

== Early life and education ==
Sharma was born to a land-owning family, well known in the eastern districts of Uttar Pradesh. His grandfather Rai Bahadur Lakshmi Narain Sharma, a barrister, and his father Indra Raj Sharma were among notable people in Mirzapur. His eldest brother Ajay Raj Sharma was the Police Commissioner of Delhi and later the Director General of the Border Security Force. He is married to Bandana Sharma, a fellow professor in his university department; they have a son, Dhruv Raj Sharma, who is an Etymology Educator, and the head of Logophilia Education Pvt. Ltd.

Sharma was educated at the Boys' High School & College, Allahabad for his early and secondary education. He entered the University of Allahabad in 1973, graduated in 1975 and then completed his master's degree in 1977. He received the Doctor of Philosophy award from the same university in 1986. He was selected for the Indian Civil Services, but opted for an academic career.

== The Tailor's Needle ==
The Tailor's Needle (2009; ISBN 0956037046, Picnic Publishing Limited, UK) is his first novel, published in 2009. It is set in India in the first half of the twentieth century. The novelist himself says: It is a Raj novel covering the era 1917–1940. The characters are Indians and Britons, including a fictional British Viceroy of India. A reviewer comments:

In a blend of fictional conventions, Lakshmi Raj Sharma's literary masterpiece The Tailor's Needle uses the past to highlight modern India's fragmentation ... His moral vitality serves as a subliminal lament to India's political class today. In a dignified reproach to those who have failed the country, Sharma's The Tailor's Needle is a final adieu to the great Indian Raj novel – we will not see the like again – as well as an homage to traditions that gave meaning to people's lives.

Gis Hoyle, a novelist and reviewer, observes that in the novel "The whole is held together by a gently mocking and yet ultimately compassionate narrative voice, which gives the reader a brief and enchanting glimpse into a world now gone, with all its faults – and all that might be loved in it, too." Ann Northfield in Historical Novels Review writes: This is an unusual novel that carries the flavour of its time and setting. Anyone who enjoys books about India would find this worth a read.

The novelist believes that his "greatest wealth is the support he has received from his students who have always overflowed into and out of his classrooms. A number of them are in high positions, some very distinguished journalists, who would go out of their way to continue their support to this author."

The Tailor's Needle has also been published in India by Penguin Books India (2012; ISBN 9780143416760).

== Intriguing Women ==
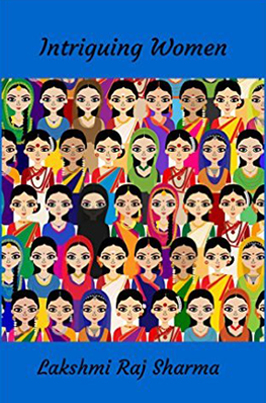
Title page of Intriguing Women

Intriguing Women is Lakshmi Raj Sharma's third work of fiction. After the success of his debut novel The Tailor’s Needle and his first book of short stories Marriages Are Made In India, Sharma now publishes a second collection of stories about women in all their infinite – and intriguing – variety. Intriguing Women has been published in Kindle edition by The Paris Press, and also in paperback. The stories in Intriguing Women have international and Indian settings. These are women who may seem superficially normal, but might not be, and women who strive for normality at all costs. Sharma also raises questions; can a woman reconcile herself to terrorism? How do we react to a woman who kills several of her husbands? Definitions of femininity are examined and magnified through the prism of fiction. We meet women who despite years of oppression, are smart enough to ride the 21st century successfully, while others are left behind, unable to handle the complexities of modern life. These stories report, reflect and examine the feminine nature. What is it like to be born a woman, most particularly an Indian woman?

== Saba & Nisha: A Love Story ==
Saba & Nisha: A Love Story is a novella. It is the fourth work of fiction by Lakshmi Raj Sharma. The novella is a literary thriller that deals with the peculiar problem of how difficult it is for an Indian man and woman to unite in marriage if they don't share their religion. This is also a crime thriller of a man who was obsessed with young women. He seemed to be experimenting with sex. It shows how women can feel helpless in a world where men are intent on getting gratification from them at any cost. It is also about criminal psychology in action. Saba is a child of nature. Her mother, Meher, has had accidents in life. The first of which was finding a lover in a man whose religion she did not know. Meher's lover is forced to marry his neighbor, the wily, Mohini, who falsely accuses him of having used her, when she is with someone else's child. Meher and Saba live in seclusion, hiding from people as much as possible. Saba joins an English course at the Allahabad University where she finds a companion in Nisha. The two girls are poles apart. Saba is all grace and concern; Nisha is self-centered and fashionable. In the university bank, the two girls happen to meet the dashing Rahul. Saba helps him and then the love story begins when the two start liking the same man. Rahul finally manages to get one of them through a series of events that make this novella a literary thriller.

== We Should Not All Be Feminists: A Novel ==
Published in 2024, the novel makes a distinction between genuine and fake feminism through a story set in India and America. The author through the story advances his opinion that 'Not every feminist is involved in a labour of love. Some are driven by the quest for power just as some are drawn to it because it indicates the right path to take in the contemporary world'. A reviewer observes that it is a 'gripping novel in which two very different feminists encounter turning points in India'.

== From a Writer's Blog: Facets of the Novel Today ==
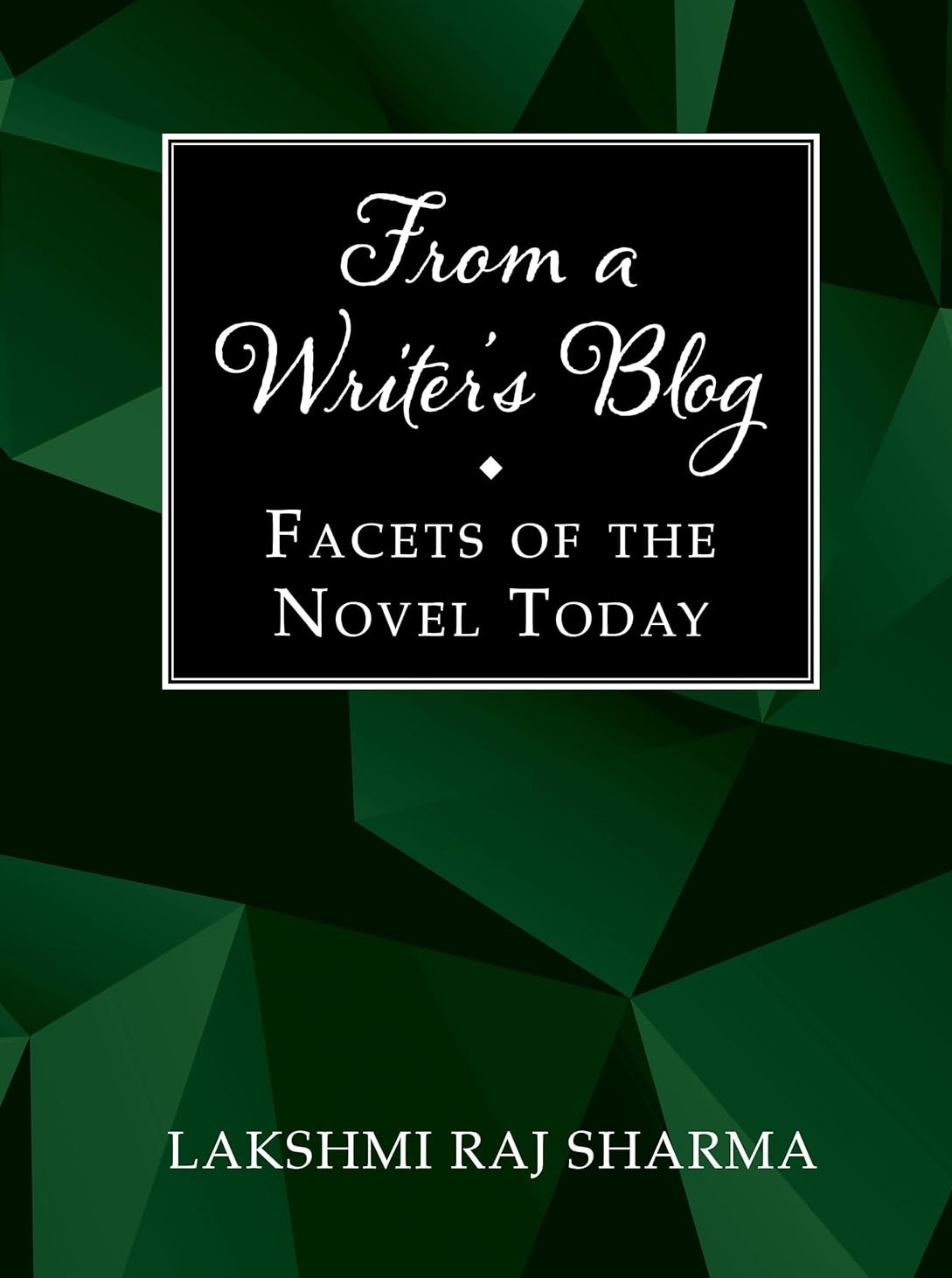
Title page of From a Writer's Blog: Facets of the Novel Today

The book claims to explain the art and craft of fiction. contains theory, criticism, and the creative process concerning the novel. It also focuses on reading, writing, and publishing the novel today.This book is significant because it deals with the nature of literary fiction and how this form of fiction is indebted to Shakespeare. It also talks about magical realism, particularly the Salman Rushdie kind.

== Other works ==
Professor Lakshmi Raj Sharma is currently working on his second novel, Emancipation, and has recently completed a further collection, The English World and Other Stories. His works include TS Eliot-Middleton Murry Debate, The Twain Shall Meet, and a short story collection Marriages are Made in India (2001; ISBN 8175957786, Writers Workshop, Calcutta). Marriages are Made in India has also been published as an e-book by Publerati (USA). Besides, he has edited Shakespeare's Problem Plays.

Prof. Sharma's writings bear several influences, but Charles Dickens' influence is more than visible. He himself admits in one of his papers published in the Oxford journal English:

I must confess that if there were no Dickens, I would have been a different kind of novelist or story-writer; or, perhaps, would not have been a novelist at all.

== See also ==
- List of Indian writers
