= Johnstongunj =

- Neighbourhood of Prayagraj

Government
  - Body: Local

Johnstongunj is a neighborhood of Prayagraj, Uttar Pradesh, India. It lies in the old city of Prayagraj near Chowk.

== See also ==
- List of streets and roads in Prayagraj
