= Boys' High School & College (Allahabad, Uttar Pradesh) =

Location
- 4, Purushottam Das Tandon Road; Civil Lines, Prayagraj; Uttar Pradesh, 1861; India; 25.4616034°N 81.8408355°E

Information
- Type: Private
- Motto: Latin: Mentem Hominis Spectato Non Frontem (Do not judge a man by his face but by his deeds)
- Established: 1861
- Principal: D A Luke
- Faculty: 200
- Gender: Boys school
- Enrollment: 7000
- Language: English
- Campus size: 13 acres (5.3 ha)
- Campus type: Suburban
- Houses: 4
- Colors: Green, Yellow, Blue, Red and Pink
- Nickname: BHS
- Affiliation: ICSE
- Alumni: bhsian
- Website: www.boyshighschool.com

Boys' High School & College (BHS) is an independent school in Prayagraj, Uttar Pradesh, India. Being founded in 1861, the school is one of the oldest in the city. It provided a Christian education to the children of Europeans and Anglo-Indians, but has always accepted children from all backgrounds. It remained a boys-only school for a long span of time but now accepts admission of girls in senior and college sections (from 2025).

It has existed on its present site in central Prayagraj since 1861. Since 2006 it has been managed by the Allahabad High School Society. It is currently affiliated to the Council for the Indian School Certificate Examinations.

On 5 November 2013. The governor of Uttar Pradesh B.L. Joshi released a commemorative postage stamp to mark 150th anniversary of Boys' High School. Alfresco

== History ==
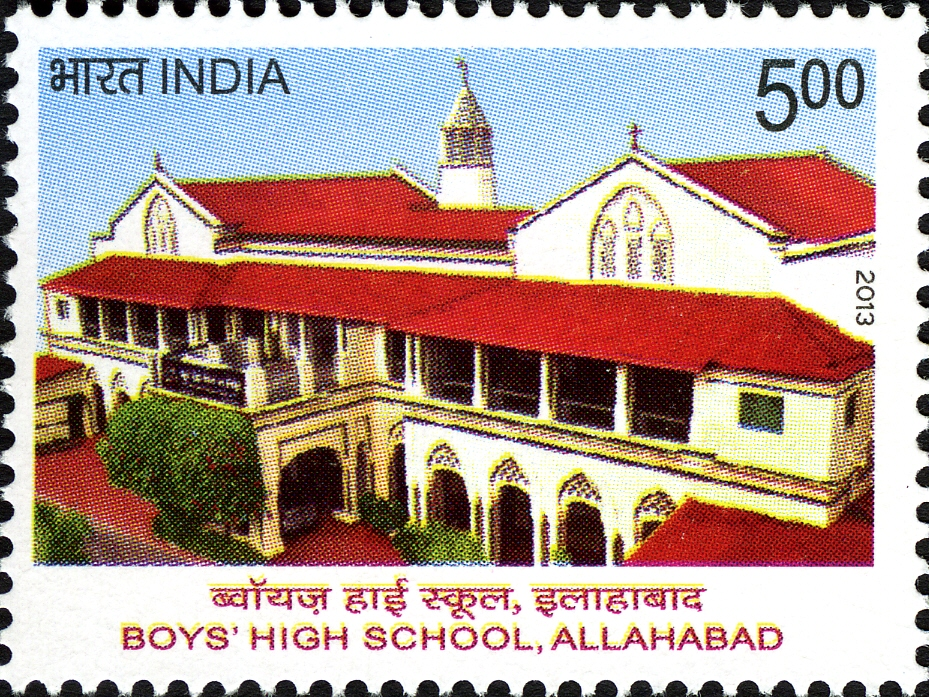
The 2013 stamp dedicated to Boys' High School

The school was established in 1861 and a stamp of it was issued by the Indian government in 2013.

== Holy Trinity School ==
In 1988, the Holy Trinity School (HTS) located in Allengunj, Prayagraj was established as an annex of the Boys' High School & College by A. T. Flynn (principal of BHS from 1967-1988) to meet the growing demand for quality education. The school consists of classes from Playway to eighth standard. HTS's current headmistress is Reena Mandal.

== Notable alumni ==
- Amitabh Bachchan, film actor, film producer, television host, occasional playback singer and former politician.
- Brahma Nath Katju, former Chief Justice of the Allahabad High Court.
- Vikas Swarup, diplomat and writer. (Oscar winning Slumdog Millionaire, a 2008 British drama film is a loose adaptation of the novel Q & A (2005) by Vikas Swarup)
- Yogendra Narain, former Secretary-General of Rajya Sabha.
- Nikhil Chopra, cricketer.
- Deepraj Rana, Indian and Nepali film and television actor.
- Raghuraj Pratap Singh, politician.
- Kunwar Rewati Raman Singh, politician.
