= Lukergunj =

- Neighbourhood of Prayagraj
- Country: India
- State: Uttar Pradesh
- City: Prayagraj

Government
  - Body: Prayagraj Municipal Corporation
- Architect: C. B. Thornhill

Lukergunj is a place in Prayagraj, India. Built in 1906 initially for the Government Press employees, it is a posh residential area. Lukergunj, well known for its clubbing culture, was once predominantly occupied by British and Anglo Indians. It is situated one kilometer south west from the Prayagraj Junction Railway Station.
