= Kareli, Prayagraj =

Neighborhood of Prayagraj, India

Kareli
- Neighborhood

Area
  - Total: 92 ha (228 acres)
  - Land: 91 ha (225 acres)
  - Water: 1.2 ha (3 acres)

Population (2009)
  - Total: 1,858
  - Density: 2,040/km^{2} (5,280/sq mi)
- Time zone: UTC-5 (Eastern)
  - Summer (DST): UTC-4 (EDT)
- ZIP code: 211016
- Area code: 0532

Kareli (officially known as Kareli Scheme) is a residential neighborhood of Prayagraj. Developed by Awas Vikas in 1979, it was one of the biggest planned neighborhoods in India.

The neighborhood is sub divided into neighborhoods like GTB Nagar, Gaus Nagar, Shams Nagar and Rehmat Nagar Colony. Kareli is the second largest colony of India in terms of Area and is one of the most expensive residential localities of Prayagraj. It is also known as Officer's colony by the localas as the large number of people who served as government servants like IAS, IPS, PCS, etc inhabited the place.

== Details ==
The neighborhood was predominantly occupied by the members of the mercantile middle class of Meerapur and Attarsuiya, and white collar workers from several public sector undertakings and private companies established in the new industrial region of Naini.

It was later overwhelmed by a richer population after the oil boom and privatization. However it is not maintained well. The roads have so many mudholes.

The majority of the people are members of the salaried class rather than business owners.
