= The Tailor's Needle =

Novel by Lakshmi Raj Sharma

- First edition
- Author: Lakshmi Raj Sharma
- Language: English
- Genre: Fiction
- Publisher: Penguin Books, India
- Publication date: 2012
- Publication place: India
- ISBN: 9780143416760

The Tailor's Needle (2009) is the debut novel of Indian writer Lakshmi Raj Sharma, who is a professor in the Department of English, University of Allahabad.

It was first published in the UK in 2009 (ISBN 0956037046) by Picnic Publishing Limited, UK and then by Penguin Books India (2012; ISBN 9780143416760). It is a Raj novel covering the era from 1917 to the 1940s and ends a little before India gets its independence. The characters are Indians and Britons, including a fictional British Viceroy of India. Sir Saraswati is educated at Cambridge and employed with the Maharaja of Kashinagar. He must leave Kashinagar and settle down in Mirzapur after a debauched Maharaja is enthroned. The Viceroy and Sir Saraswati have a battle of wits and diplomacy. His wife and three children, and their problems, form the thrust of the novel.

Set in India in the first half of the twentieth century, the story chiefly revolves round the elder daughter, Maneka, who refuses to be traditional and goes through a variety of experience that makes her an extraordinary person, a woman of the future. Her affair with the British Collector, Larry Stephens, and her marriage with Mohan contain unusually weird experiences. Her brother’s love affair and its problems provide some of the tension. But Maneka is largely visualized as a daughter of Sir Saraswati whose life provides the basis of the novel. His ambivalence related to the Indian National Movement and his loyalty to the British, and his final decision to contribute directly to the movement, forms the basic plot.

Commenting on the title of the novel, the novelist says: In the metaphor of the title there is a suggestion that human beings, if they are to be successful, must be like the tailor’s needle which passes through every material without making distinction.

The novel shows the interactions between Indians and the Britons and their ensuing racial problems. The British enjoy their Indian experience and their presence makes upper class Indian life more vibrant. The novel juxtaposes sublime and ridiculous moments of royal natives as well as the British who came to India. The novel examines preindependence India, the feelings of different people towards the British, and the movement towards autonomy. A reviewer comments:

In a blend of fictional conventions, Lakshmi Raj Sharma's literary masterpiece The Tailor's Needle uses the past to highlight modern India's fragmentation ... His moral vitality serves as a subliminal lament to India's political class today. In a dignified reproach to those who have failed the country, Sharma's The Tailor's Needle is a final adieu to the great Indian Raj novel – we will not see the like again – as well as an homage to traditions that gave meaning to people's lives.

Gis Hoyle, a novelist and reviewer, observes that in the novel "The whole is held together by a gently mocking and yet ultimately compassionate narrative voice, which gives the reader a brief and enchanting glimpse into a world now gone, with all its faults – and all that might be loved in it, too." Ann Northfield in Historical Novels Review writes: This is an unusual novel that carries the flavour of its time and setting. Anyone who enjoys books about India would find this worth a read.

A reviewer Bhanumati Mishra says, "The Tailor's Needle has a distinct Dickensian feel about it. The sub–plots of Maneka–Larry affair, Yogendra–Gauri love–story and Mohan's mysterious murder are what give the novel a multi–genre tag enhancing the dramatic aspect of narration. In the bargain it not only makes the book more readable but also sets it apart from the rest of the run–of–the–mill 'Raj' novels. With an array of finely etched recognisable characters and themes of crime, social class, empire and ambition, it reminds the reader of Bleak House and Great Expectations." Another reviewer Savitha Karthik, whose review of The Tailor's Needle appeared in The Deccan Herald, says: "Set in the early part of the 20th century, The Tailor’s Needle has a mix of many elements including drama, adherence to old-world values and rebellion."

It is a work of multicultural literary fiction and contains strains of magic realism. The novelist reiterates the same in one of his papers published in the Oxford journal English:

When I wrote this novel, little did I know the way in which the plot and its technique were to crystallize. I thought I was writing a very realistic novel based on episodes that had links with actual happenings. The Tailor's Needle, as I now see it, is structured by and large round fairy tale like situations that had entered the narrative rather surreptitiously. In it, there are two maharajas and a British viceroy of India (who is even more like a maharaja). Maharajas and viceroys are now a thing of the past and carry with them associations of the ‘once upon a time’ situations. Much of the romance of these figures enters the pages of the novel. Also in the novel are strange sequences of events and bizarre situations in which marriage alliances are made more like they happen in fairy tales than in reality. Unrealistic situations keep following. There is a sanyasi who can summon Sir Saraswati and his son to his ashram without actually sending a message to invite them. The sanyasi leaves his body at will to the astonishment of the father and son, dying according to plan, with no pain. These may be unreal happenings, but I had heard of such things actually happening in my childhood and therefore could narrate them with a straight face. There is a fakir, who curses Maneka and actually destroys her marriage with Mohan. The second half of the novel's plot is largely shaped as a result of this curse.

The novel has received encouraging response from readers and critics. It was ranked among the top ten books of the week in Kerala. Besides, the novel has found a mention in business and inspirational writings, too. A reviewer says, The Tailor's Needle is an exploration A of culture and colonialism set against the independence movement.

== Reception ==
The Tailor's Needle has received various reactions and reviews from critics in India. Nidhi Parikh, for Indian Book Critics, writes, "this novel takes the readers to India before independence with all its glories and follies". Alok Mishra, a book critic from India, writes that the novel is primarily about the time when thinking beyond social norms was generally beyond the imagination of Indian people. "It’s about the time when breaking the barriers and shackles of caste and class was considered a daunting step." He also adds that this novel is for readers who have the patience to let the plot unfold. "The ideal readers for this novel should have patience because the ideas take time to unfold." Writing for Ashvamegh Literary Magazine, Alka highlights the central character's importance and also adds that the novelist has given other characters enough space to develop. She writes, "he has carefully built his narrative around Sir Saraswati Chandra throughout the novel but allowing more than enough space for Maneka and her adventures, Yogendra and his ‘rebellious love’ with Gauri..."
