= Bai-Ka-Bagh =

Coordinates: 25°26′N 81°51′E

- town
- Interactive map of Bai-Ka-Bagh
- Country: India
- State: Uttar Pradesh

Languages
  - Official: Hindi
- Time zone: UTC+5:30 (IST)

Bai-Ka-Bagh is a locality (township) of Prayagraj, Uttar Pradesh, India.
