= William Emerson (British architect) =

British architect (1843–1924)

Sir William Emerson FRIBA
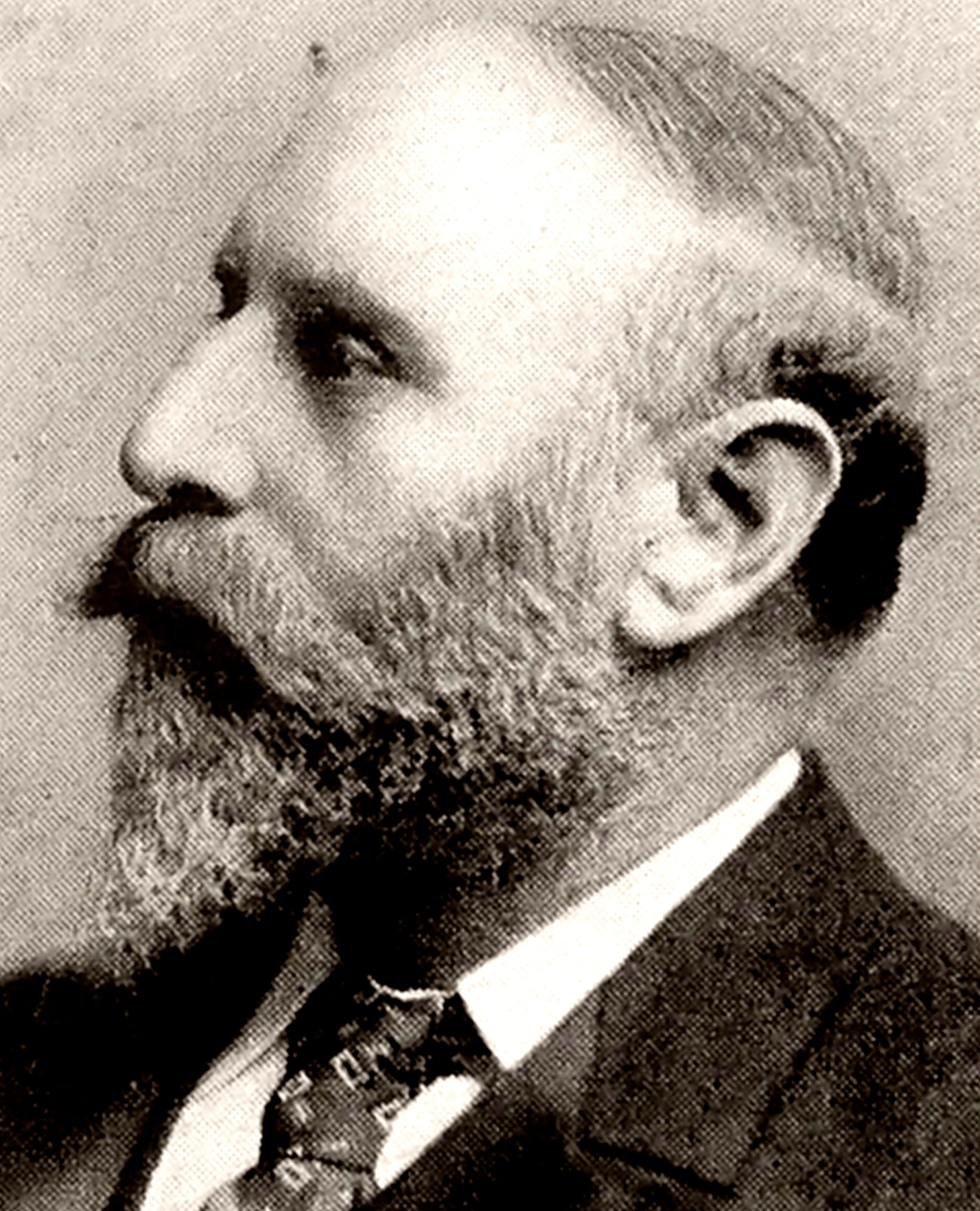
- Sir William Emerson, in 1905
- Born: 3 December 1843; London, England
- Died: 6 December 1924 (aged 81); Shanklin, England
- Education: King's College London
- Occupation: architect
- Buildings: Crawford Market; All Saints Cathedral, Allahabad; Muir Central College; Victoria Memorial, Kolkata

Sir William Emerson FRIBA (3 December 1843 – 26 December 1924) was a British architect, who was President of the Royal Institute of British Architects (RIBA) from 1899 to 1902, and worked extensively in India. He was the original architect chosen to build Liverpool Cathedral.

== Early life and education ==
Born in 1843, he was son of a silk manufacturer in Whitechapel, London, and educated at King's College, London. Around 1861, he was articled to William Gilbee Habershon, who soon thereafter entered into partnership with Alfred Robert Pite. Emerson subsequently became a pupil of William Burges.

== Career ==
=== Early career ===
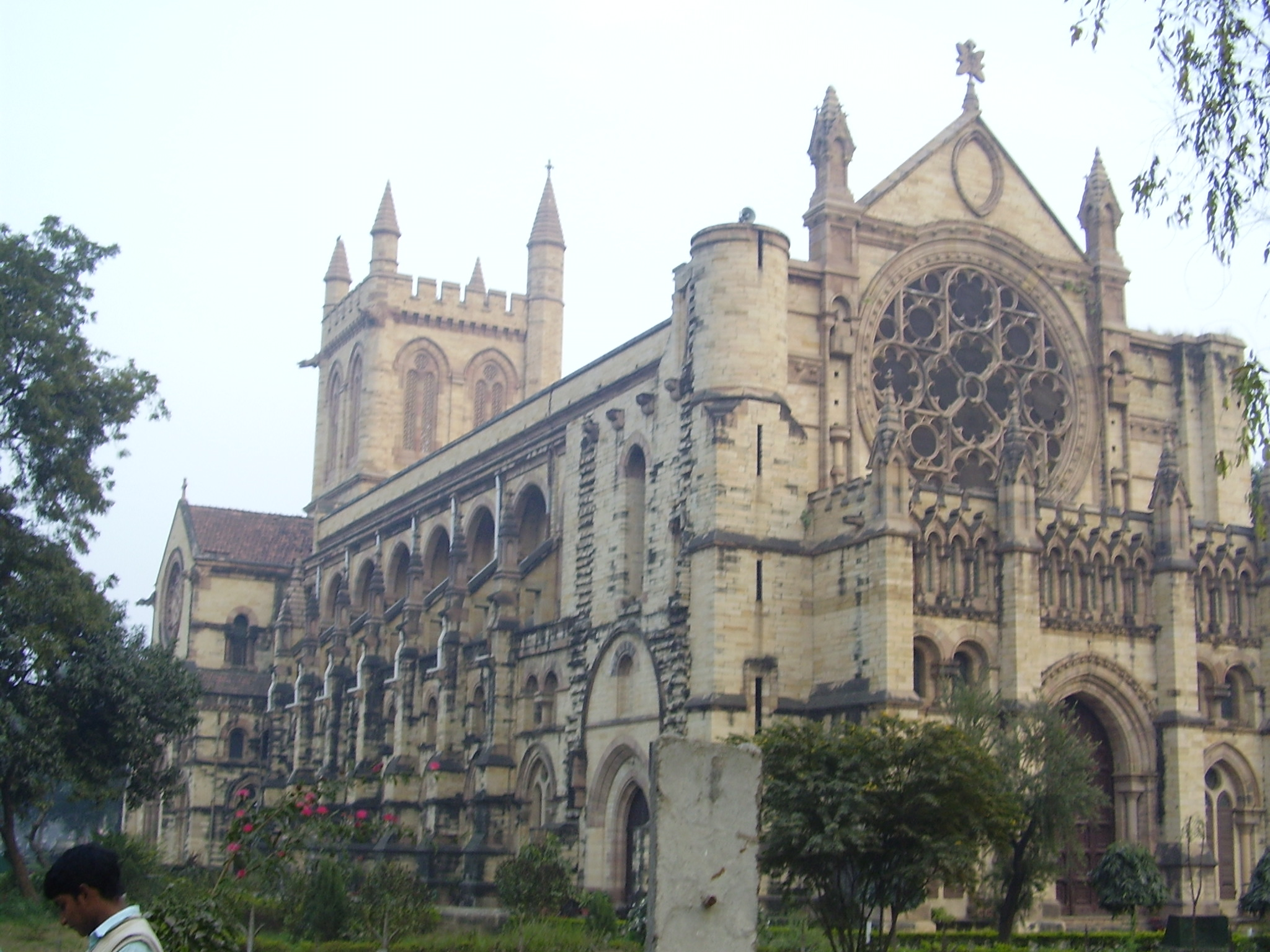
All Saints Cathedral, Allahabad

He went to India in 1864, initially to supervise the building of Bombay school of art in Bombay to Burges’s plan, which in the event was never built. Instead he stayed on to practice architecture in Bombay, returning to London in 1869, where he opened an office in Westminster. He continued however to do his best work in India. His first big commission was for Mumbai's Gothic Crawford Market (1865–71) with a fountain executed by Rudyard Kipling's father, John Lockwood Kipling, who was also responsible for the bas-reliefs on the main entrance.

=== Stints in Allahabad and Bhavnagar ===
Thereafter he moved to Allahabad where he designed his most important works, All Saints Cathedral, Allahabad (1869–93) and Muir College (1872-78). He then did two buildings for the princely Bhavnagar State, Nilambag Palace (1894–95) and the Takhatsinhji Hospital (1879–83).

In 1896, he designed the Clarence Memorial Wing St. Mary's Hospital, Paddington, London

=== Later work and Victoria Memorial ===
Eventually he designed his most known building, the Victoria Memorial (1905–21) in Calcutta.

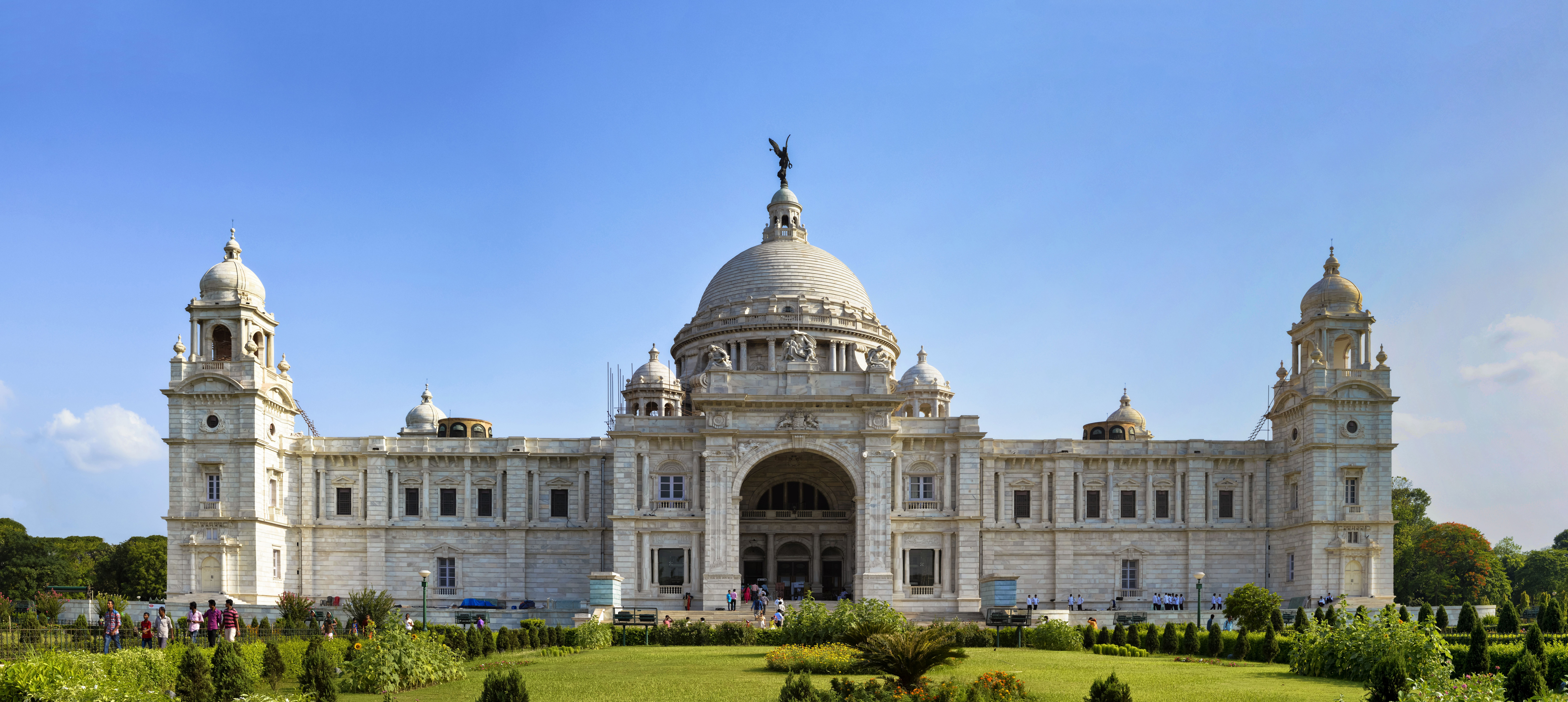
Victoria Memorial Hall, Calcutta

He was admitted ARIBA on 12 February 1866, his proposers being Burges, Coutts Stone and Henry Edward Kendall; and was elevated to FRIBA on 21 April 1873, his proposers being Stone, Thomas Hayter Lewis and Thomas Roger Smith. He was President of the Royal Institute of British Architects (RIBA) from 1899 to 1902, and was knighted in the 1902 Coronation Honours, receiving the accolade from King Edward VII at Buckingham Palace on 24 October that year.

Most of his later work was in India; his most familiar being the design of the marble clad Victoria Memorial Hall in Calcutta (1905 onwards), described as "Britain's answer to the Taj Mahal". Although asked to design a building in the Italian Renaissance style, Emerson was against the exclusive use of European styles and instead incorporated Mughal elements into the structure.

He died in Shanklin, Isle of Wight in 1924.

== Personal life ==
He had married in 1872 Jenny, the daughter of Coutts Stone and sister of fellow architect Percy Stone.

== Style ==
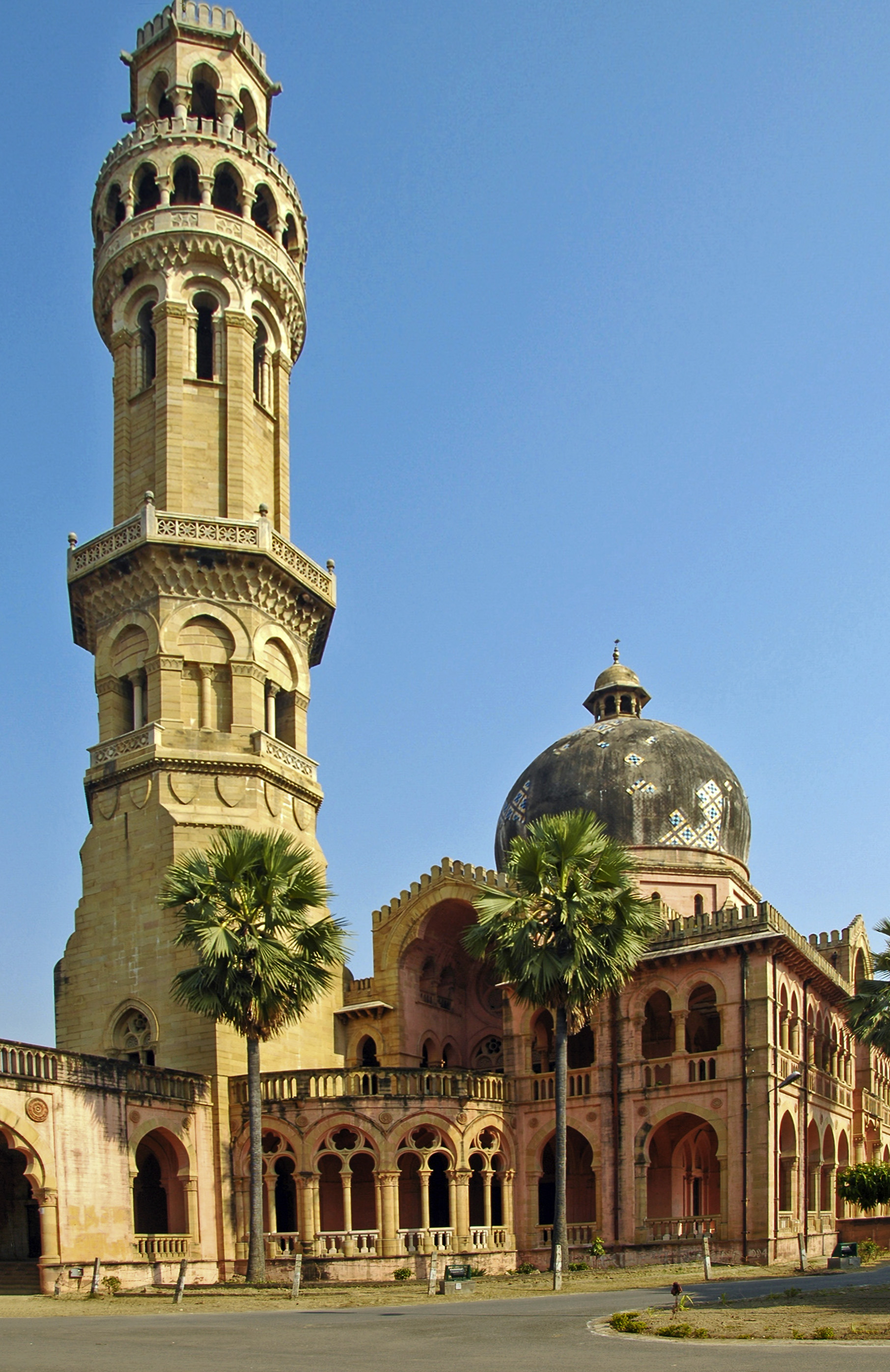
Muir Central College

Emerson was a pioneer of the Indo-Saracenic style, which developed in the 19th and 20th centuries in British India.

=== List of buildings ===
- 1869 - Crawford Market, Bombay (now Mumbai), India
- 1870 - All Saints Cathedral, Allahabad, India
- 1872 - Muir College, Allahabad (now Prayagraj)
- 1878 - St Mary the Virgin Church, Brighton, Sussex
- 1879 - Takhatsinhji Hospital, Bhavnagar
- 1894 - Nilambag Palace, Bhavnagar
- 1896 - Clarence Memorial Wing St. Mary's Hospital, Paddington, London
- 1905 - The Victoria Memorial, Calcutta (now Kolkata), India
- 1916 - High School, Vadodara

His design for Liverpool cathedral won first prize in the first, abortive competition in 1883.

== Gallery ==
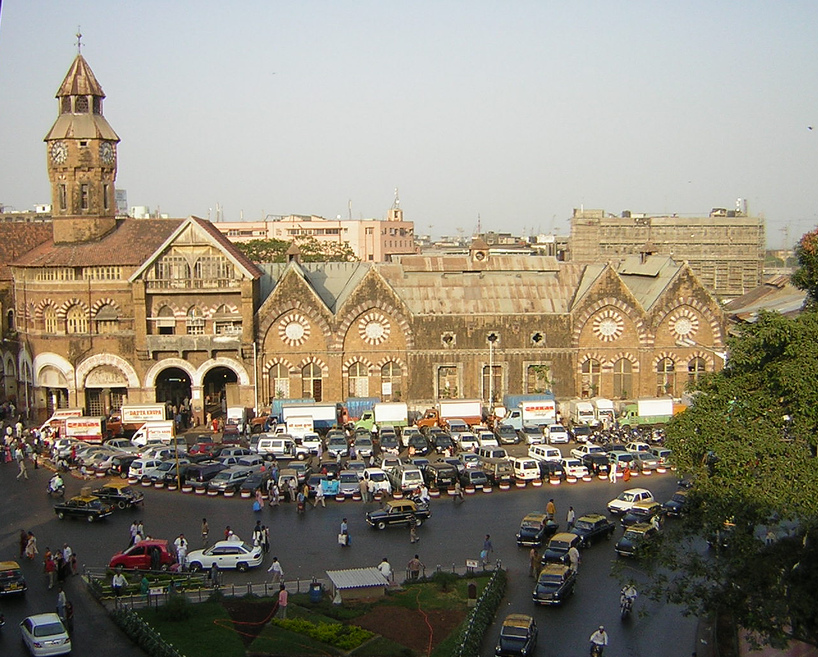
Crawford Market, Mumbai

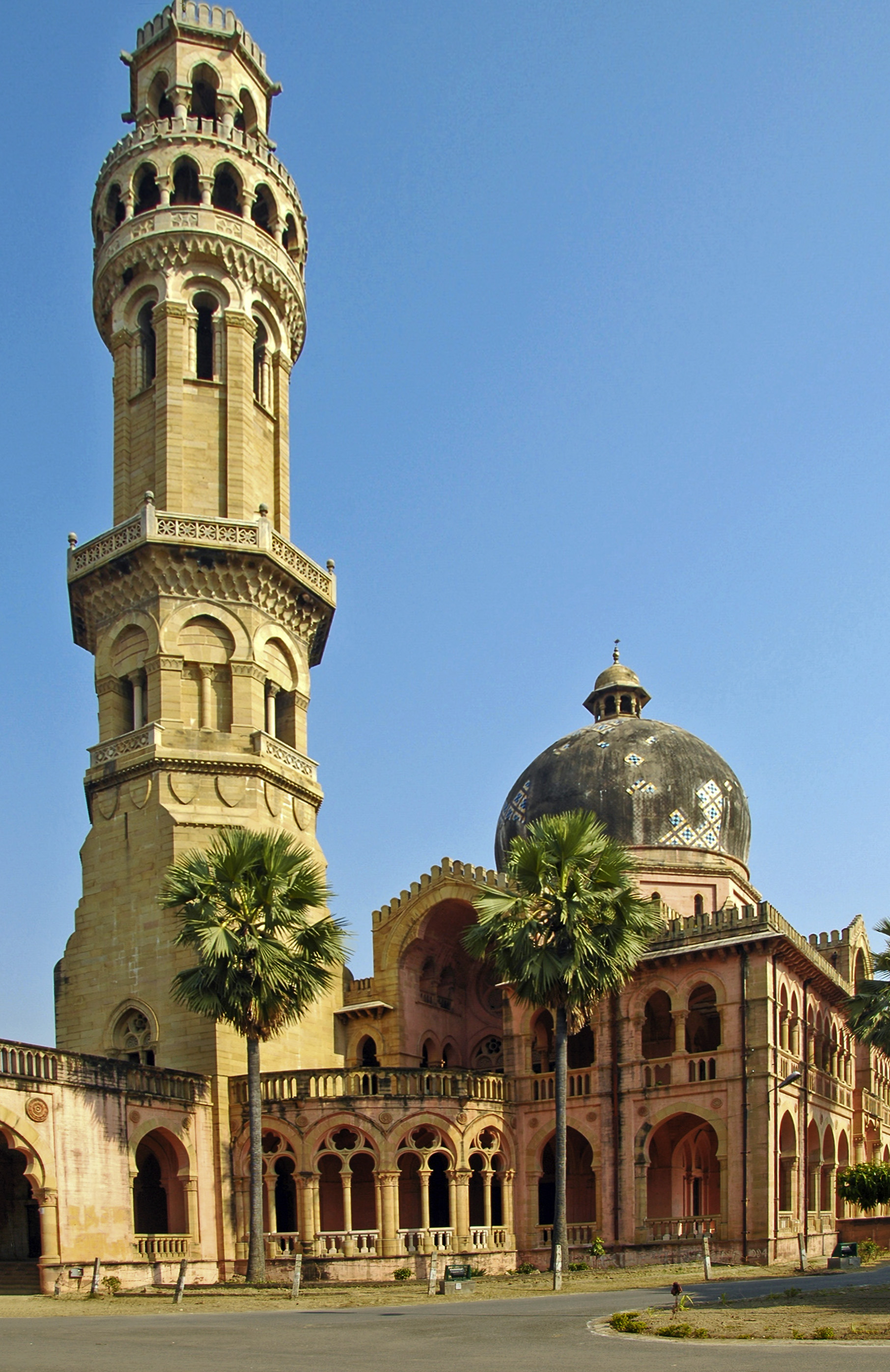
Muir College now part of Allahabad University

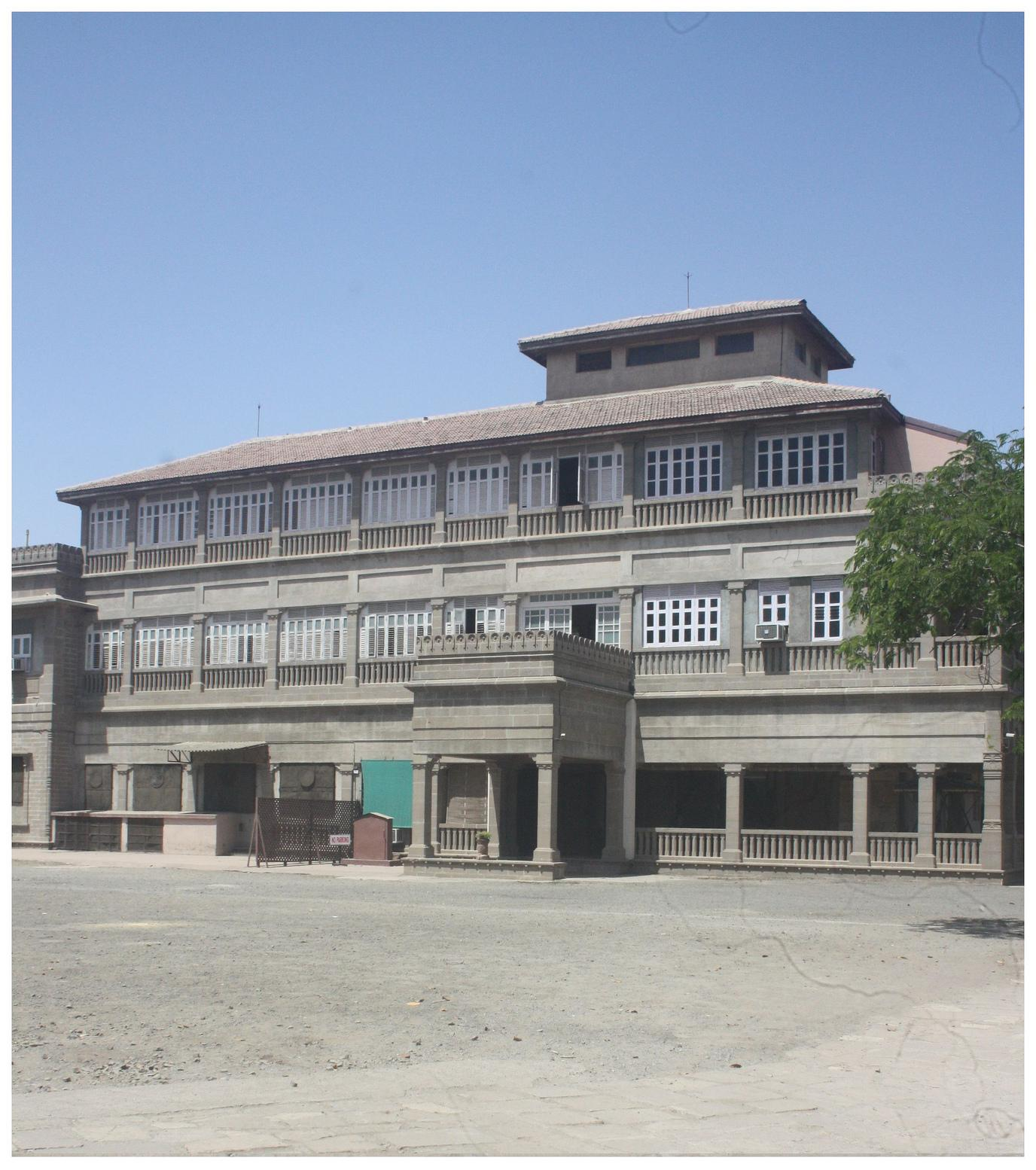
Nilambagh Palace, Bhavnagar

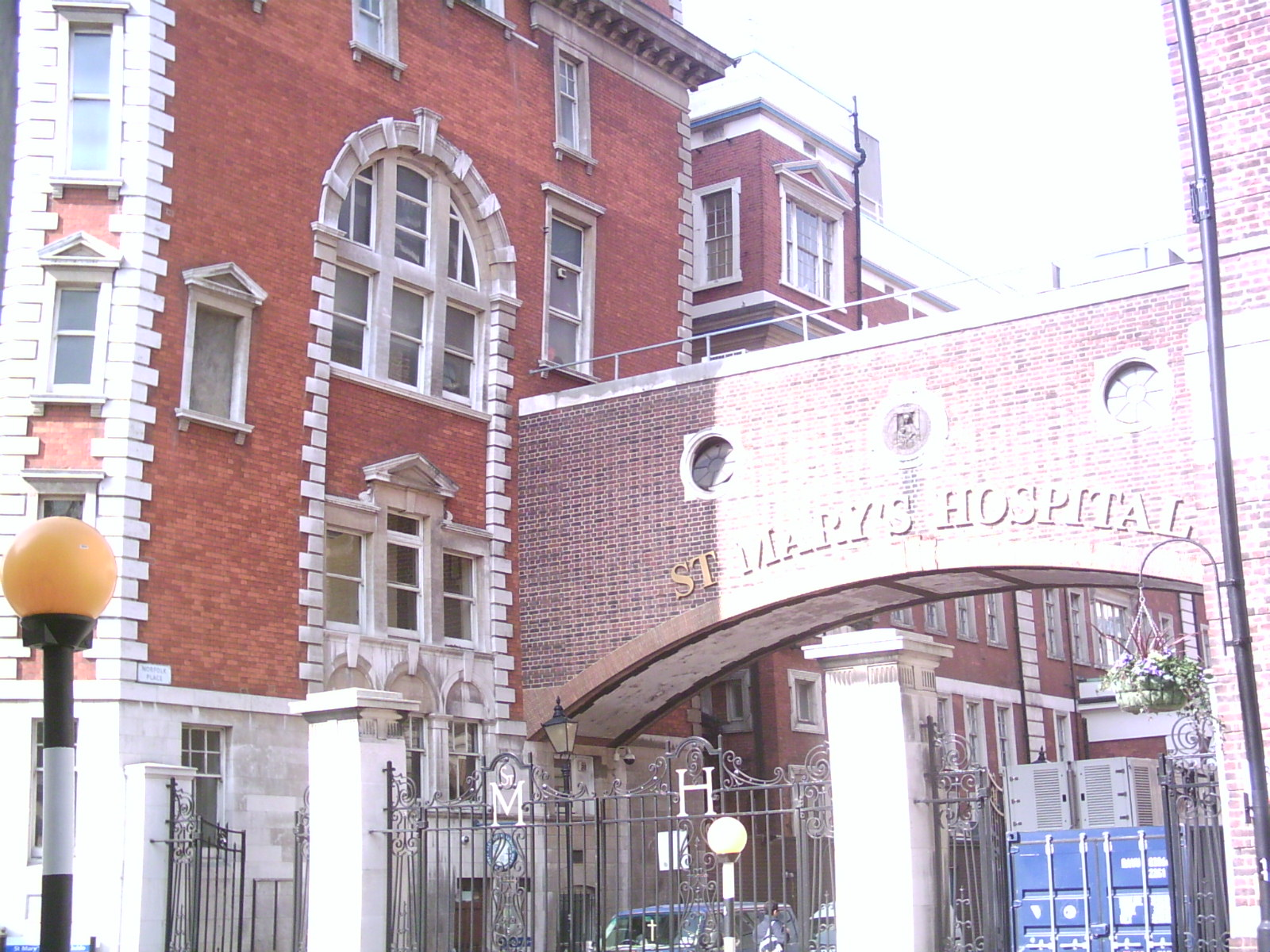
Clarence Memorial Wing St. Mary's Hospital, Paddington, London

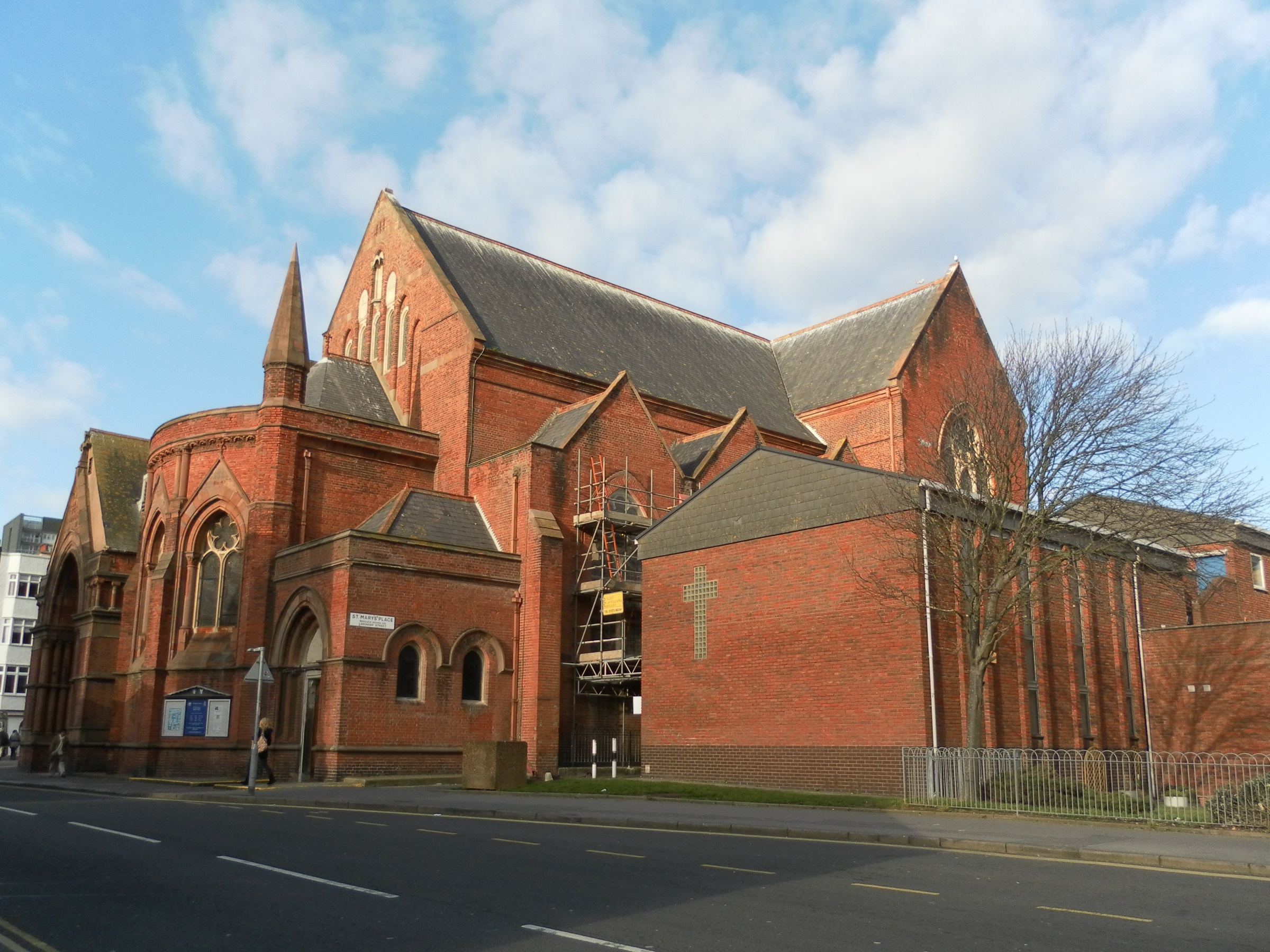
St Mary the Virgin Church, Upper St James's Street, Brighton.
