= Alopibagh =

Locality/township of Prayagraj, Uttar Pradesh, India

Coordinates: 25°27′N 81°52′E

Alopibagh is a locality/township of Prayagraj, Uttar Pradesh, India. The locality is close to the Kumbh Mela area, the Sangam, the rivers Ganges and Yamuna, and one of the most ancient Hindu temples of India, the Alopi Devi Mandir, is also in this locality. Alopibagh is adjacent to Daraganj, the oldest suburb of Prayagraj and the most important bathing Ghat on the bank of Ganges.

As per some Historical records, The Great Maratha Warrior Shreenath Mahadji Shinde had done constructive works at Prayag Sangam, in 1772 AD.
