= Daragunj =

- town
- Country: India
- State: Uttar Pradesh

Languages
  - Official: Hindi
- Time zone: UTC+5:30 (IST)
- Vehicle registration: UP
- Website: up.gov.in

Daraganj is a locality (township) of Prayagraj, Uttar Pradesh, India.
