= Mumfordgunj =

Neighborhood in Prayagraj, India

Mumfordgunj or Mumfordganj, built in late 1930s, is a neighborhood in Prayagraj, India. There are MIG and HIG colonies in this locality. It also has a municipality school.
