= Kydgunj =

Kydganj
- town
- Country: India
- State: Uttar Pradesh

Languages
  - Official: Hindi
- Time zone: UTC+5:30 (IST)
- Vehicle registration: UP 70
- Website: up.gov.in

Kydgunj is a township of Prayagraj, Uttar Pradesh, India.
