= Sulem Sarai =

- city
- Interactive map of Sulem Sarai
- Country: India
- State: Uttar Pradesh

Languages
  - Official: Hindi
- Time zone: UTC+5:30 (IST)
- Vehicle registration: UP 70
- Website: up.gov.in

Sulem Sarai is a locality/township of Prayagraj, Uttar Pradesh, India.
