= Sohbatiabagh =

Town in Uttar Pradesh, India

Sohbatiabagh Sohbatiya Bagh
- town divided in old & new
- Country: India
- State: Uttar Pradesh

Languages
  - Official: Hindi
- Time zone: UTC+5:30 (IST)

Sohbatiabagh is a locality (township) of Prayagraj, Uttar Pradesh, India.
