= Alopi Devi Mandir =

Hindu Temple in Uttar Pradesh, India

Alop Shankari Devi Temple
- Alopshankari Siddhipeeth
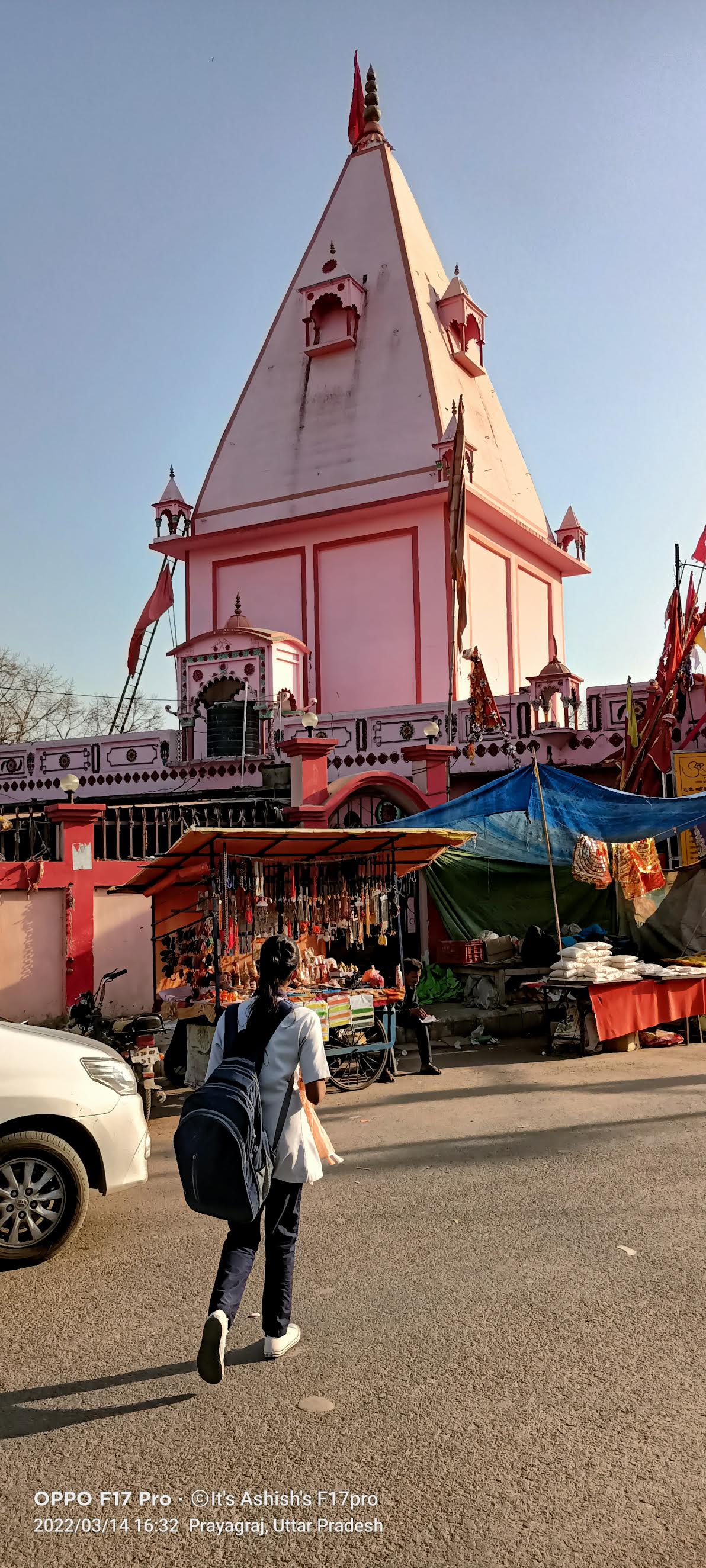

Religion
- Affiliation: Hinduism
- District: Prayagraj
- Deity: Sati
- Status: Functional

Location
- Location: Alopibagh, Alopi Bagh, Prayagraj, Uttar Pradesh 211006
- State: Uttar Pradesh
- Country: India

Website
- https://www.srimandir.com/temples/alopidevi-temple?lang=en

Alopi Devi Temple is a Hindu temple, situated in Alopibagh in Prayagraj in state of Uttar Pradesh, India. It is near to the holy Sangam, or confluence, where the rivers Ganges, Yamuna and the legendary Sarasvati meet. Kumbh Mela is near to this place. As per some historical evidences, the Maratha warrior Shreenath Mahadji Shinde had developed the Sangam place during his stay at Prayagraj in 1771–1772. Later in 1800s, Maharani Baizabai Scindia has done some works for renovation of Sangam ghats and temples at Prayagraj.

This temple is peculiar in that there is no statue of any deity in this temple, rather, there is a wooden carriage or 'doli' which is worshipped. The origin of the name, Alopi (disappeared) Bagh lies in the Hindu belief that after the death of his wife Sati, the grieving Shiva travelled through skies with her dead body. Vishnu, to relieve him from this agony, threw his Chakra at the corpse, resulting in the fall of various parts of the body at various places in India, which were sanctified by the touch of the Goddess' body parts and hence were thereby deemed holy places for pilgrimage. The last part fell at this location thereby named as "Alopi" (where disappearance was concluded)and the holiest of all. However, this claim is debatable since there is only one Shakti peeth in Prayagraj which is Lalita Devi temple where fingers of Sati are supposed to have fallen.

Another more credible version is found in oral history traditions narrated by old inhabitants of the area. It dates back to the time when the entire region was covered by dense forests infested with dreaded dacoits. A marriage procession happened to pass through the forest. Marriage processions, in medieval times, used to be the most vulnerable targets of robbers as they used to return loaded with gold and other riches received as gifts. While deep into the jungle, the marriage party found itself surrounded by robbers. After killing all the men and looting the wealth the robbers turned to the 'doli' or carriage of the bride. When they unveiled the carriage they found there was no one inside. The bride had magically disappeared. The word went around, history became legend and legend became myth. A temple came up at the site where this incident occurred and locals started worshiping the bride as "Alopi Devi" or the 'virgin goddess who had disappeared'.

Alopi Devi continues to be worshiped by thousands of people living in the region who share every festival, marriage, birth and death with their guarding deity..

Though it was always a prominent temple in the neighborhood, its reach and following has seen a significant rise since the 1990s leading to large-scale renovation of the surrounding area.

== Gallery ==
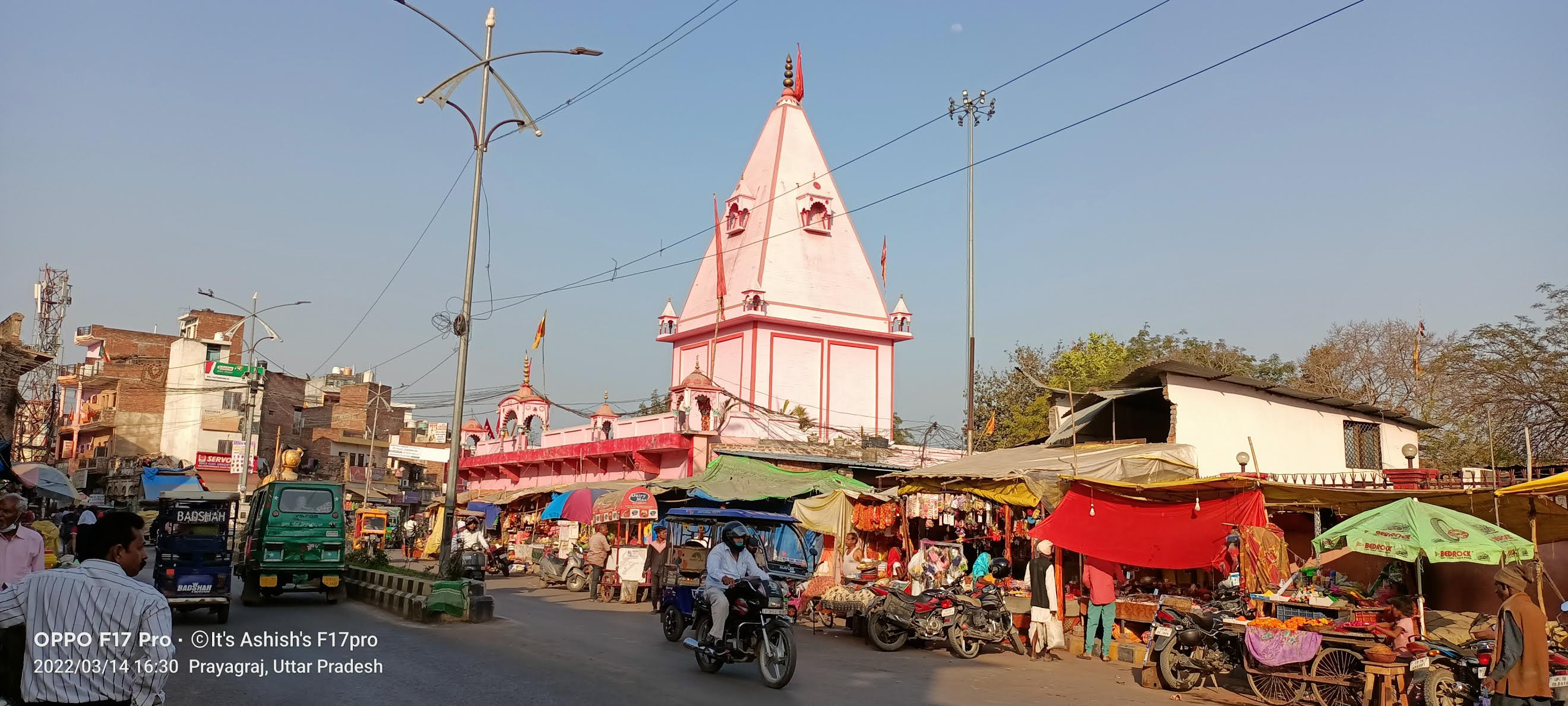

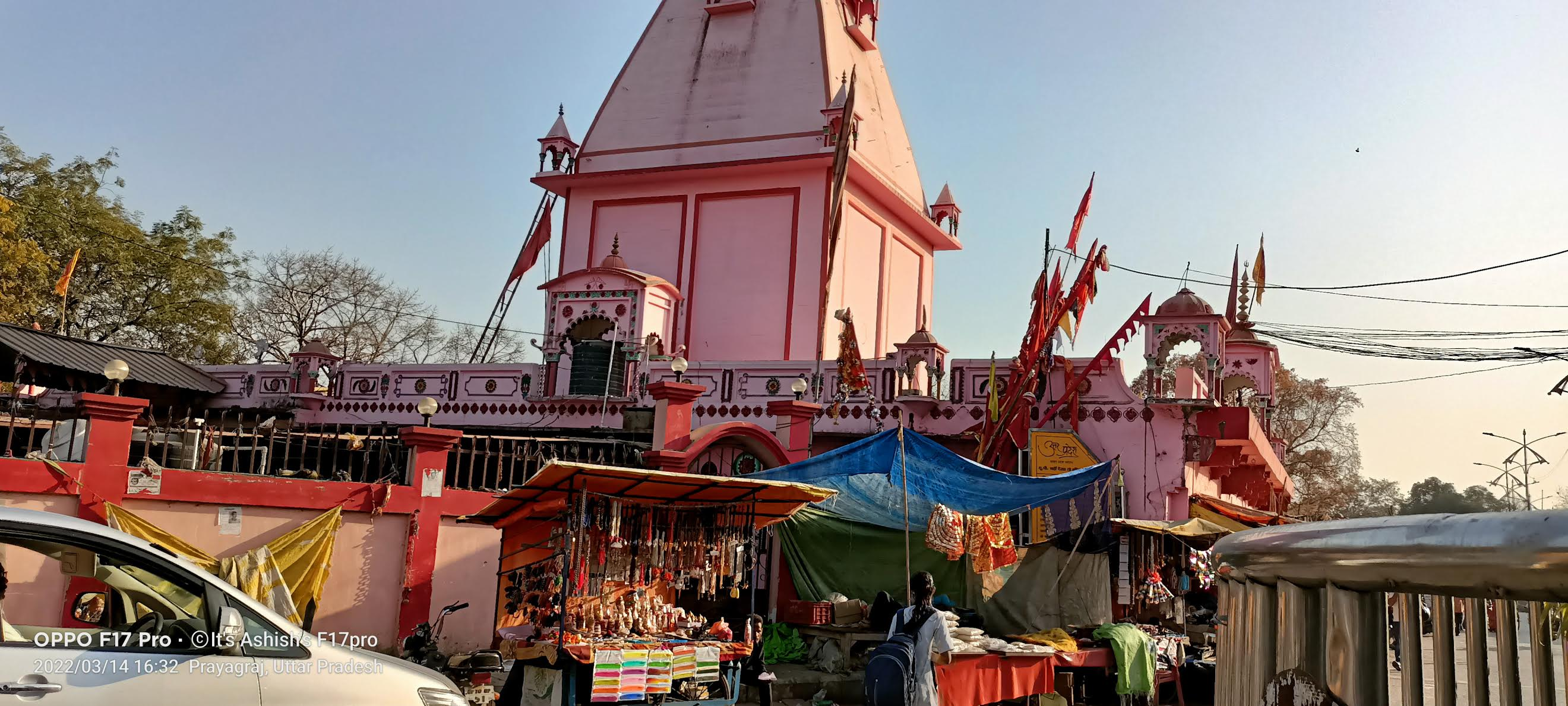

== See also ==
- Mata Mawai Dham
- Durgan Dham Temple
