= Teliyargunj =

Coordinates: 25.488309°N 81.86558°E

Teliyargunj Teli community based name Teliyarganj
- town
- Interactive map of Teliyargunj
- Country: India
- State: Uttar Pradesh
- District: Prayagraj

Languages
  - Official: Hindi, Urdu
- Time zone: UTC+5:30 (IST)
- PIN: 211004
- Vehicle registration: UP 70
- Loksabha constituency: Phulpur
- Website: up.gov.in

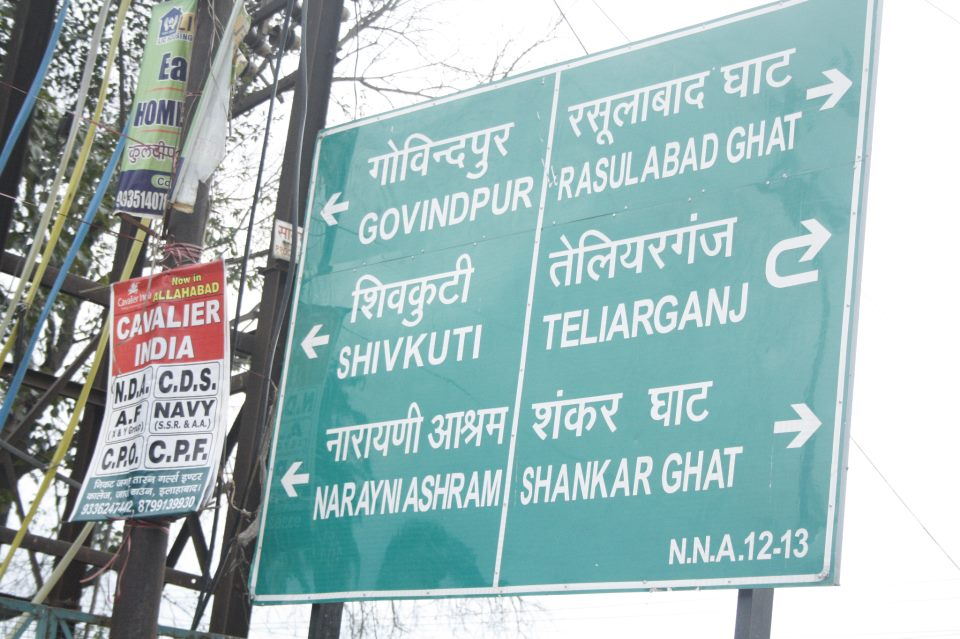

Teliyargunj is a township in Prayagraj, Uttar Pradesh, India. Motilal Nehru National Institute of Technology, Prayagraj, a prominent engineering college, and the Northern Regional Institute of Printing Technology are two institutions of higher education located in the township. The old Cantonment of Prayagraj is located nearby. The Ganges River flows alongside the township. The Prayagraj-Lucknow Road passes through Teliyargunj.

In 2017, Ranjan Kumar Prajapati (Congress) was elected in the Prayagraj Nagar Nigam elections.
