= Rajapur, Prayagraj =

Locality/township of Prayagraj, Uttar Pradesh, India

Rajapur is a locality/township of Prayagraj, Uttar Pradesh, India.

Rajapur is a very old locality of Prayagraj. Its residents are of various religions. The Late Jang Bahadur Patel advocate and Member of Parliament was from there.

Rajapur is crowded due to an influx of villagers. Presently the town has more than 40,000 inhabitants and is rapidly increasing, straining the infrastructure.
