= Dhoomangunj =

Dhoomanganj
- town
- State: Uttar Pradesh
- Demonym: ellahabadi

Languages Allahabadi
  - Official: Hindi
- Time zone: UTC+5:30 (IST)
- Postal code: 211011
- Vehicle registration: UP 70
- Website: up.gov.in

Dhoomangunj (Hindi: धूमनगंज) is a locality near Prayagraj, Uttar Pradesh, India.
