= Khuldabad, Prayagraj =

Khuldabad
- village
- Location in Uttar Pradesh, India Khuldabad (India)
- Coordinates: 25.439554°N 81.820625°E
- Country: India
- State: Uttar Pradesh

Languages
  - Official: Hindi
- Time zone: UTC+5:30 (IST)

Khuldabad is a locality/township of Prayagraj, Uttar Pradesh, India.
