= List of roads in Prayagraj =

This list of streets and roads in Prayagraj covers all of the major streets and roads in Prayagraj, India. Streets in India are often synonymous to 'roads'. They are also called Marg or sometimes Path in Hindi.

== List ==
- Bank Road
- Auckland Road
- Ahmad Road on the southern edge of the Kareli residential neighbourhood links Noorullah Road at 25.422114°N 81.820904°E with the Karamat Ki Chauki residential area.
- Noorullah Road The road starts from Prayagraj Junction and end towards Karelabagh
- Cariappa Road
- Clive Road
- Colvin Road
- Cooper Road
- Dr. Lohia Road
- Drummond Road The road was named after Major General Henry Drummond who was posted in Japan during World War II( during the British Raj ), In later years his son Allen Henry Drummond became A.D.M ( Additional District Magistrate ) somewhere Uttar Pradesh in North India. Allen Drummond passed on in 2003.
- Dr Muzaffar Nasim Road it is major road in GTB Nagar kareli Prayagraj.
- Elgin Road - It is a major road in Civil Lines.
- Jawaharlal Nehru Road
- Hamilton Road - Now renamed as Amarnath Jha Marg.
- Hastings Road runs north to south in central Prayagraj and has been divided into two renamed Nyaya Marg which runs from Muir Road to PD Tandon Marg, and CSP Marg which runs from PD Tandon Marg to Smith Road.
- Kamla Nehru Road
- Katra Road
- Kidgunj Road
- Kutchery Road
- Lala Lajpat Rai Road is developed as a 'model road'.
- Lawrence Road
- Leader Road
- Liddle Road
- Lowther Road
- Luker Road
- MG Marg
- Mahatama Gandhi Marg, also known as MG Marg, is one of the major streets in Prayagraj, named after Mahatma Gandhi. It stretches from Allahabad High Court in the east making intersection with PD Tondon Marg and Nyaya Marg, passing through Civil Lines, to the west till in ends at the esplanade. It is bordered by several shops, malls and a number of historical and religious buildings and offices and notable landmarks like All Saints Cathedral and Alfred Park in the north. It intersects with Sardar Patel Marg making Subash Cross, a notable town square of the city.
- Muir Road
- Nawab Yusuf Road
- Noorullah Road
- Park Road
- Patrika Marg
- PD Tondon Marg
- Sardar Patel Marg
- SN Marg
- Sarojini Naidu Marg and formerly Queen's Road is a major road in Allahabad which is lined with many public building and government offices and notable landmarks like General Post Office, All Saints Cathedral, Prayagraj, Telegraph Office and Government Press.
- Smith Road
- Stanley Road
- Strachey Road
- Tashkent Marg
- Thornhill Road
- Triveni Road
- University Road
- Zero Road connects Ghantaghar to Rambagh. Important places around Zero Road are Zero Road Interstate Bus Stand, Ajanta Talkies, Mansarovar talkies, Chandralok Talkies.
