= Guru Tegh Bahadur Nagar, Mumbai =

Neighborhood in Mumbai, India

Coordinates: 19.034331°N 72.864203°E

Guru Tegh Bahadur Nagar (GTB Nagar), formerly known as Koliwada, is a neighbourhood in Sion, Mumbai, named after Sri Guru Tegh Bahadur Ji, the ninth Guru of Sikhism.

Originally home to Mumbai's indigenous Koli community, it is also known as Koliwada. A colony was constructed for the rehabilitation of Sikh and Hindu refugees who came from North West Frontier Province of Pakistan after the Partition of India

Today, many of the buildings and tenements originally constructed for the refugees are in a dilapidated state, and are awaiting demolition and redevelopment.

The neighborhood's residents, however, have been protesting the order to vacate the property and its subsequent demolition because they are looking for a different rental and redevelopment arrangement.

== Location ==
Guru Tegh Bahadur Nagar is in South Central Mumbai, with the nearest railway station being Guru Tegh Bahadur Nagar railway station on the Harbour Line of the Mumbai Suburban Railway.

== Religion ==
GTB Nagar and its surrounding area has seven gurdwaras, notable among which is the Gurdwara Dashmesh Darbar; and temples which were built for the worship of Punjabi Hindus notable one being Shree Geeta Bhavan Hari Mandir.

The gurdwaras are known for their charitable trusts and community service initiatives, particularly for their responsiveness during natural calamities and the langar meals served throughout the day.

=== Colleges ===
- Guru Nanak College of Arts, Science and Commerce

== Notable people ==
- Akshay Kumar
- Johnny Lever
- Veeru Devgan
- Prithviraj Kapoor
- Kuldeep Singh, music director

== See also ==
- Koli People
- King Mandhata
