= Allengunj =

Coordinates: 25.465°N 81.865°E

Allengunj एलनगंज
- town
- Interactive map of Allengunj
- Country: India
- State: Uttar Pradesh

Languages
  - Official: Hindi
- Time zone: UTC+5:30 (IST)
- Vehicle registration: UP 70
- Website: up.gov.in

Allengunj (Urdu: الین گنج) also spelt Allenganj, is a locality (township) of Prayagraj, Uttar Pradesh, India. It is adjacent to the University of Allahabad.
