= Tagoretown =

Neighborhood in Prayagraj, India

Tagore Town is a neighborhood in Prayagraj, India. It was built in 1909. It was predominantly populated by Bengali's. The place is named in the memory of Rabindranath Tagore. It is also the home of the former Cabinet Minister of India and current MP Pandit Murli Manohar Joshi of the Bharatiya Janata Party (BJP).
