= Attarsuiya =

- town
- Country: India
- State: Uttar Pradesh

Languages
  - Official: Hindi
- Time zone: UTC+5:30 (IST)
- Vehicle registration: UP
- Website: up.gov.in

Attarsuiya is a locality (township) of Prayagraj, Uttar Pradesh, India. Attarsuiya is just 2 km away from Railway station. Nearby localities are Rani Mandi, Atala & Meerapur. Attarsuiya is named after scholar Atri and his wife Anasuya.
