= All Saints Cathedral, Prayagraj =

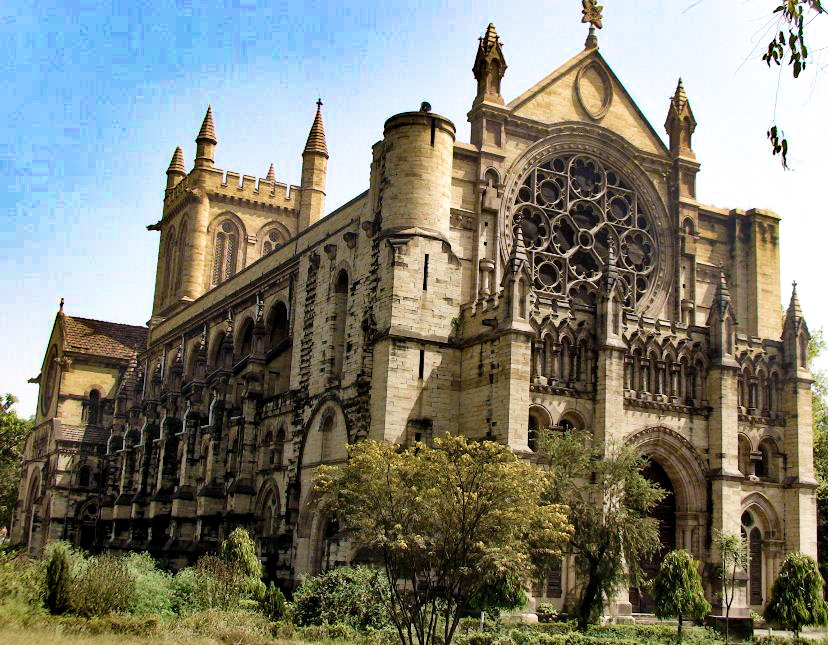
- Façade of the All Saints' Cathedral
- All Saints Cathedral, Prayagraj
- 25.4512°N 81.8264°E
- Location: Sarojini Naidu Marg, Civil Lines, Prayagraj, Uttar Pradesh, 211001
- Country: India
- Denomination: Church of North India
- Churchmanship: High Church

History
- Status: Cathedral
- Founded: 1 April 1871; 155 years ago
- Founder(s): William Muir; Elizabeth Huntly Wemyss
- Dedication: All Saints
- Consecrated: 1887

Architecture
- Functional status: Active
- Architect: William Emerson
- Style: Gothic Revival

Specifications
- Capacity: 500-600
- Length: 240 ft (73 m)
- Width: 56 ft (17 m)
- Height: 103 ft (31 m)
- Materials: Marble, Red sandstone, Tile, Stained glass

Administration
- Diocese: Diocese of Lucknow
- Deanery: Allahabad

Clergy
- Bishop: Rt. Rev. Morris Edgar Dan
- Vicar: Rev. Dr. Vinita Eusebius

All Saints' Cathedral, also known as Patthar Girja (Church of Stones), is a cathedral of the Church of North India located in Prayagraj, India.

Modelled after 13th-century Gothic style churches, it is among the Gothic Revival buildings built by the British during their rule in India. British architect Sir William Emerson, who also designed the Victoria Memorial, Kolkata, designed the cathedral in 1871. It was consecrated in 1887 and was completed four years later. The church celebrates its anniversary on All Saints' Day (1 November) and has been part of the Church of North India since 1970. The cathedral is at the centre of a large open space at the crossing of two of the principal roads of Prayagraj, MG Marg and SN Marg.

== History ==
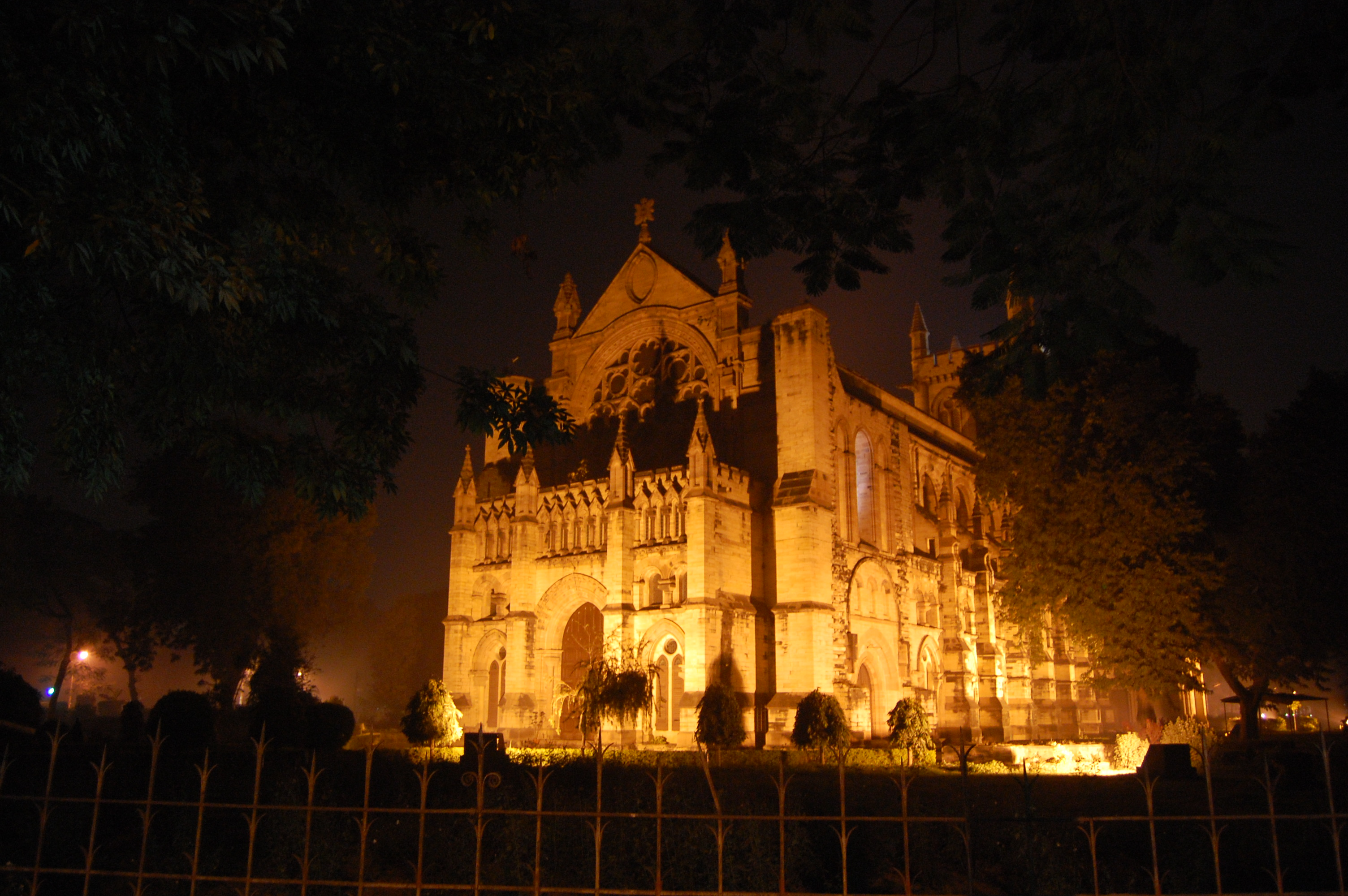
All Saints Cathedral, Prayagraj at night

The land for the cathedral was granted by Sir William Muir, the lieutenant governor of the North Western Provinces; thereafter Elizabeth Huntly Wemyss, his wife, laid the foundation stone on 10 April 1871. British architect Sir William Emerson was employed to design the building, he had already designed the Crawford Market, Bombay, and followed this with the Muir Central College, Allahabad (1872–78), which is now part of the Allahabad University.

According to The Building News, 25 November 1887, the cathedral was commenced some 15 years previously, and was at first intended for the cathedral of the North-Western Provinces and to have an open verandah and ambulatory all round. It was, however, afterwards decided that the cathedral of the North-Western Provinces should be at Lahore instead, though it is now thought probable that this will eventually form the cathedral church of a new diocese. Following the extension of the railway network, Allahabad has grown to the extent that it has been found necessary to provide for the addition to the transept and choir of a nave accommodating a much larger congregation that was originally expected The general simplicity of detail was necessitated by the class of workmen obtainable in this part of India at the time of construction. The work was carried out in a cream-coloured stone with fine red sandstone dressings, and the roof is covered with red local tiles.

== Architecture ==
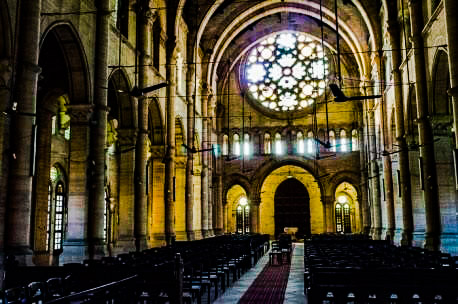
The nave

The cathedral's nave is about 40 feet wide and 130 feet long, the total length of the church is about 240 feet, and the internal width is about 56 feet. It is designed to accommodate 300 to 400 persons. It is a remarkable example of the architecture of colonial India. The glass and marble work of the cathedral is perfectly preserved even after more than 125 years. The cathedral also houses many plaques which depict the death of different British nationals for a variety of reasons during their rule in India. The church is surrounded by a lush green garden.

The pulpit is an exceedingly fine piece of workmanship in alabaster by Mr Nicholls of Lambeth, from Mr Emerson's designs. Narrow aisles were made in the building thus giving a total internal width of about 56 feet. There are two transepts to the north and south respectively, a chancel with an ambulatory, a central tower at the intersection of the nave and transepts and a west porch. The lantern tower, Victoria Tower, is a memorial to Queen Victoria.

== See also ==
- Christianity in India
- William Emerson
- List of churches in Prayagraj
- List of cathedrals in India
- List of tourist attractions in Prayagraj
