= Civil Lines, Prayagraj =

Civil Lines Cannington
- Neighborhood of Prayagraj
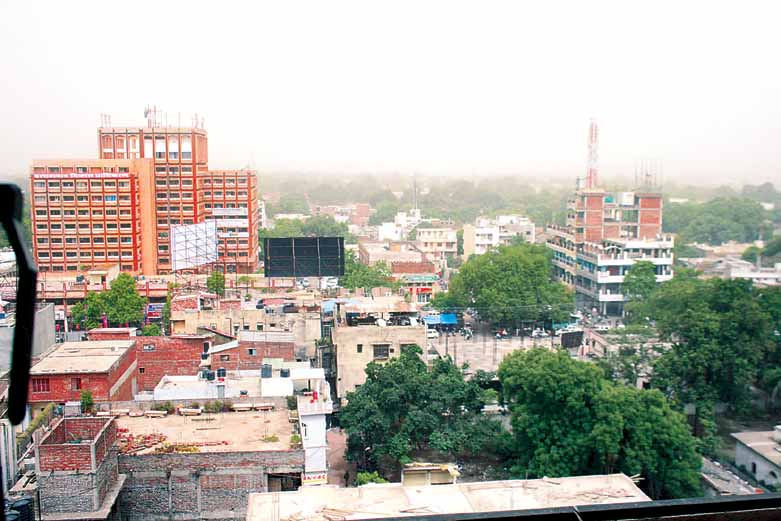
- Civil Lines and neighbourhood skyline of Allahabad Metropolis
- Nickname: White Town
- Interactive map of Civil Lines
- Coordinates: 25°27′19″N 81°50′07″E
- City: Prayagraj
- Country: India
- Built in: 1857
- Founded by: Cuthbert Bensley Thornhill

Government
  - Type: Mayor-council government
  - Body: Prayagraj Municipal Corporation

Civil Lines (formerly Cannington also Canning Town) is a Civil Lines neighborhood of Prayagraj, Uttar Pradesh, India. It is the upper-class central business district of the city and is famous for its urban setting, gridiron plan roads high rise buildings, offices, cafes, restaurants, hotels, malls, shopping complexes, theatres etc. Built in 1857, under the supervision of Cuthbert Bensley Thornhill, it was the largest town-planning project carried out in India before the establishment of New Delhi.

== History ==
Civil Lines was built in 1858 a few months after the end of the Rebellion of 1857, when around 600 Meo people were massacred by the British East India Company's (private) Bengal Army under Colonel Neil, in retaliation for their alliance with the Indian Independence Movement activists and eight villages were seized to form a new township. During the early period of its development it was referred to as the White Town of the city as it was predominated by the British people and a very few Indians were allowed.

== Demographics ==
A population of 923 was registered in Civil Lines during the 1951 Census.

== See also ==
- List of tourist attractions in Prayagraj
- Neighborhoods of Allahabad
