= Rambagh, Prayagraj =

Locality of Prayagraj, India

Rambagh
- village
- Interactive map of Rambagh
- Country: India
- State: Uttar Pradesh

Languages
  - Official: Hindi
- Time zone: UTC+5:30 (IST)
- Vehicle registration: UP
- Website: up.gov.in

Rambagh is a locality/township of Prayagraj, Uttar Pradesh, India.
