= List of villages in Buxar district =

Buxar district is one of the thirty-eight districts of Bihar state, India.

This is list of villages of Buxar district according to their respective blocks.

== Barhampur ==
1. Adharpa
2. Akorhi
3. Arjunpur
4. Atrauliya
5. Babhani
6. Bagen
7. Baghaunch (Ditto)
8. Baghi
9. Bahduri
10. Bairia
11. Balua
12. Bararhi
13. Barhampur
14. Baruhan
15. Basudharpah
16. Baswar
17. Bhada
18. Bhadsari
19. Bhadwar
20. Bharkhar
21. Bhojwalia
22. Bisupur
23. Bojhwalia
24. Chak Durjanpur
25. Chak Pheralal
26. Chakani
27. Chandarpura
28. Chaube Chak
29. Choubey Bala Gangbarar
30. Chulhan Chak
31. Churamanpur
32. Dallupur
33. Dangrabad
34. Dekuli
35. Dhadha
36. Dhaf Chapra
37. Dhan Chhapra
38. Dharauli
39. Dhebani
40. Dhorhanpura
41. Dubauli
42. Dundh Chapra (Ditto)
43. Ekdar
44. Ekrasi
45. Gahauna
46. Gaighat (Part)
47. Garhatha Kalan
48. Garhatha Khurd
49. Gayghat
50. Ghanshampur
51. Ghinhu Chapra
52. Ghinhu Chapra (Sukul Chapra)
53. Harnathpur
54. Hathilpur
55. Jaipur
56. Jogia
57. Jug Chapra
58. Kaithi
59. Kant
60. Kapurpur
61. Karanpura
62. Kathia
63. Khochariyawan
64. Kisagar
65. Kodai
66. Kuawan
67. Kurthiya
68. Madhukara
69. Maharajganj
70. Mahaur Naubara
71. Mahuar
72. Maji Karanpur
73. Manipur (Ditto)
74. Manki
75. Menhmarara
76. Milki Bisupur
77. Nainijor
78. Nainijor Diara Pachhim (Ditto)
79. NainijorDiaraPachhimTurkau
80. Nandpur
81. Nimej
82. Pahari Chak
83. Pakrahi
84. Palatpura
85. Pandepur Path (Ditto)
86. Panrepur
87. Parnahi
88. Piprarh
89. Pirthi Chapra (Part)
90. Pokharhan
91. Pokhra (Ditto)
92. Purwa
93. Raghunathpur
94. Rahthua
95. Rajpur
96. Ramdiha
97. Ramgarh
98. Ranipur
99. Rudrapur
100. Rupah
101. Sapahi (Ditto)
102. Sukalpura
103. Udhaura
104. Umedpur

== Buxar ==
1. Ahirauli
2. Ammadarhi
3. Arjunpur
4. Babhani
5. Balapur
6. Balua
7. Balua
8. Baluwa
9. Barka Nuawan
10. Baruna
11. Basauli
12. Belahi
13. Belaur
14. Betwa
15. Bhabhuar
16. Bhabhuar Milki
17. Bhatauliya
18. Bhosrampur
19. Bibiganj
20. Bishunpura
21. Boksa
22. Buxar (Nagar Parishad)
23. Chhotka Nuawan
24. Churamanpur
25. Dahiwar
26. Dalsagar
27. Darappur
28. Desarbuzurg
29. Dubauli
30. Dubauli
31. Dubauli
32. Dudhar Chak
33. Dumariya
34. Dungurpur
35. Ganauli
36. Garani
37. Gharaipur
38. Gobindapur
39. Gobindpur
40. Gogaura
41. Gohuwana
42. Gopnuawan
43. Haripur
44. Harkishunpur
45. Hukaha
46. Ijribudhan
47. Ijrisiram
48. Jagdara
49. Jagdishpur
50. Jagdishpur
51. Jarigawan
52. Jaso
53. Jatmahi
54. Kamarpur
55. Kamhariya
56. Kamkarahi
57. Karauniyan
58. Karhansi
59. Katkaulia
60. Khadra
61. Kharanti
62. Kharka
63. Khutaha
64. Kiratpura
65. Korarawa
66. Kothia
67. Kudratipur
68. Kulhariya
69. Lachhmanpur
70. Lachhmipur
71. Lalganj
72. Lalsagar
73. Larai
74. Laropur
75. Mahdah
76. Majhari Naubarar
77. Majharia
78. Manauwar Chak
79. Marautiya
80. Marwa
81. Mathia
82. Mathia Gurdas
83. Milki
84. Misraulia
85. Misraulia
86. Misrauliya
87. Mungraul
88. Nadaon
89. Narayanpur
90. Nat
91. Nidhua
92. Niranjanpur
93. Nuaon
94. Padumpur
95. Paharpur
96. Panditpur
97. Panditpur
98. Panrepatti
99. Panrepur
100. Parari
101. Parari
102. Parasiya
103. Parmanandpur
104. Patelawa
105. Pipra
106. Pirtampur
107. Puliya
108. Rahasi Chak
109. Rahua
110. Ramdiha
111. Rampur
112. Ramubariya
113. Sagrampur
114. Sahupara
115. Sarimpur (CT)
116. Shankarpur
117. Sherpur
118. Shiupur
119. Simra
120. Sohani Patti
121. Sonbarsa
122. Sondhila
123. Suratpur
124. Tarapur
125. Thora
126. Thoragangbarar
127. Tiwaripur
128. Umarpur
129. Umarpur Diara
130. Umarpur Diara (Ditto)
131. Umarpur Naubarar
132. UmarpurJot MisranBarkaGaon
133. Upadhyapur
134. Usrauliya

== Chakki ==
1. Arak
2. Bedauli
3. Bhariar
4. Chanda
5. Charkhi
6. Hemdapur
7. Henwan
8. Jawahi (DItto)
9. Jawahir Diara (Ditto)
10. Kalyanpur (Ditto)
11. Liladharpur
12. Minapur (Ditto)
13. Parsia
14. PranpurDegreiSudaprivi Council
15. Sheopur Diar (Ditto)
16. Sheopur Diara
17. Sheopur Diar Janubi (Ditto)
18. Sheopur Diar Somali (Ditto)

== Chaugain ==
1. Amsari
2. Baida
3. Belahri
4. Bhadi
5. Birpur
6. Chaugain
7. Chhotka Dih
8. Dangauli
9. Kherhi
10. Khewali
11. Mangpa
12. Masahariya
13. Murar
14. Nachap
15. Nokhpura
16. Ojhabarawan
17. Panrepur
18. Parasiya
19. Phaphdar
20. Puraina
21. Reuntiya
22. Samusar
23. Thari

== Chausa ==
1. Akhauripur
2. Alawalpur
3. Alawalpur
4. Baghelwa
5. Bahabuddin Chak
6. Bahadurpur
7. Bairampur
8. Balbhaddarpur
9. Banarpur
10. Bechanpurwa
11. Betbandh
12. Bhadua
13. Bhilampur
14. Bishunpur
15. Burhadih
16. Chausa
17. Chunni
18. Debi Dehra
19. Dehri
20. Deuriya
21. Dharamagatpur
22. Dharampur
23. Dhundhani
24. Gopalpur
25. Goshainpur
26. Hadipur
27. Hafizwa
28. Hinguhi
29. Holartikar
30. Husenpur
31. Isapur
32. Jagdishpur
33. Jalilpur
34. Jalwandei
35. Jokahi
36. Kanak Narayanpur
37. Kathgharwa
38. Kathtar
39. Kharagpura
40. Khelafatpur
41. Khemrajpur
42. Khorampur
43. Kocharhi
44. Kusahi
45. Kusrupa
46. Madanpura
47. Madhopur
48. Mahdewa
49. Mahmudpur
50. Mahuari
51. Manipur
52. Mianpur
53. Mohanpurwa
54. Narainapur
55. Narbatpur
56. Narbatpur Taufir
57. Nawagawan
58. Nawar
59. Nikris
60. Nyayapur
61. Ora
62. Paliya
63. Pauni
64. Pithari
65. Puraina
66. Rajapur
67. Rampur
68. Rampur Khurd
69. Rasulpur
70. Rohinibhavan
71. Sagra
72. Salarpur
73. Sarenja
74. Sauri
75. Sauwanbandh
76. Sharifpur
77. Sikraur
78. Sonpa
79. Tikaitpur
80. Tiwaya
81. kashipur
82. konia

== Dumraon ==
1. Adpha
2. Amthua
3. Araila
4. Ariyawon
5. Asapur
6. Athaon
7. Bairia
8. Bankat
9. Basgitia
10. Basgitiya
11. Belamohan
12. Bharkhara
13. Bharkunria
14. Bhikha Bandh
15. Bhojpur Jadid
16. Bhojpur Kadim
17. Chanda
18. Chhatanwar
19. Chilhari
20. Chuar
21. Churamanpur
22. Dahigana
23. Dakhinawan
24. Dhangain
25. Dheka
26. Dihri
27. Dubkhi
28. Dumraon (Nagar Parishad)
29. Ekauni
30. Hakimpur
31. Harni Chatti
32. Hata
33. Hathelipur
34. Kachainiya
35. Kam Karahi
36. Kamdharpur
37. Kanjharua
38. Karuaj
39. Kashia
40. Khairahi
41. Khairahi
42. Kopwa
43. Kudria
44. Kulhawa
45. Kumbhi
46. Kunriya
47. Kuransarae
48. Kusalpur
49. Lahana
50. Lakhan Dehra
51. Lohsar
52. Marsara
53. Marwatia
54. Mathila
55. Mirchi
56. Misraulia
57. Misraulia
58. Mohammadpur
59. Mohanpur
60. Mugaon
61. Mungasi
62. Mustafapur
63. Nandan
64. Naudiha
65. Nazirganj
66. Nenuan
67. Nikhura
68. Niranjanpur
69. Noaon
70. Parmanpur
71. Partap Sagar
72. Phogu Tola
73. Pipri
74. Piria
75. Puraini
76. Rajdiha
77. Rampur
78. Rasulpur
79. Rehiya
80. Sagarpur
81. Sahipur
82. Samhar
83. Saro Dih
84. Sarora
85. Sikta
86. Sirampur
87. Sowan
88. Sundarpur
89. Suraundha
90. Tulshipur
91. Turiganj
92. Uderampur
93. Udhopur
94. Usrauliya

== Itarhi ==
1. Alampur
2. Alampur
3. Atraulia
4. Atrauna
5. Aurahi
6. Bagahipatti
7. Bahuara
8. Baikunthpur
9. Bairi
10. Baksara
11. Baladewa
12. Baniapatpur
13. Bara Dih
14. Barhana
15. Barkagaon
16. Baruna
17. Basantpur
18. Basao
19. Basaon
20. Basudhar
21. Bhakhwa
22. Bhaluha
23. Bhar Chakia
24. Bharparasi
25. Bhatbahuwara
26. Bhelupur
27. Bhikhanpura
28. Bhitihara
29. Bijhaura
30. Binodpur
31. Bishunpur
32. Chamela
33. Chameli
34. Chandi
35. Chandpur
36. Chandu Dehra
37. Charaia Tikar
38. Charaia Tikar Sahi
39. Chilbila
40. Chilbili
41. Chilhar
42. Dalippur
43. Daru Dehri
44. Dasarathtal
45. Debkali Dharampura
46. Dehria
47. Dewasthapur
48. Dhanbakhra
49. Dharampur
50. Dharampura
51. Fatehpur
52. Gadaipur
53. Gangapur
54. Garua Bandh
55. Ghiuria
56. Girdharpur
57. Girdharpur
58. Gobindpur
59. Gopalpur
60. Gopalpur
61. Gopinathpur
62. Goppur
63. Hakimpur
64. Hansraj Dih
65. Harpur
66. Harpur
67. Harpur
68. Hetampur
69. Hundrahi
70. Indarpur
71. Indaur
72. Indaur
73. Inglish
74. Isharpura
75. Itarhi
76. Itaunha
77. Jah
78. Jahanpur
79. Jaipur
80. Jalwasi
81. Jamuaon
82. Jigna
83. Kadipur Kalan
84. Kadipur Khurd
85. Kaithana
86. Kaleanpur
87. Kaliyanpur
88. Kanpura
89. Kapurpatti
90. Karanjuwa
91. Karmi
92. Kasimpur
93. Kauresar
94. Kauresari
95. Kawalpokhar
96. Khakrahi
97. Khanta
98. Kharhana
99. Khatiwa
100. Khekhsi
101. Konch
102. Kukurha
103. Kushahi
104. Lakshmipur
105. Lodhas
106. Lohandi
107. Madan Dehra
108. Mahamadpur
109. Mahila
110. Makhdumpur
111. Makundpur
112. Malkaudha
113. Mananpur
114. Mangolpur
115. Mangolpur
116. Manoharpur
117. Marufpur
118. Mathauli
119. Misraulia
120. Mitanpura
121. Mohanpur
122. Murarpur
123. Murtazapur
124. Mustafapur
125. Nahrar
126. Narayanpur
127. Nathpur
128. Nihalpur
129. Nirbhaipur
130. Orap
131. Ori
132. Paharpur
133. Pakri
134. Panditpur
135. Panrepur Khairi
136. Parasi
137. Parsia
138. Parsotimpur
139. Pasahara
140. Pauna
141. Pithanpura
142. Pithni
143. Raghupur
144. Raipur
145. Raksia
146. Ramrapur
147. Rasulpur
148. Reka Kalan
149. Reka Khurd
150. Sahipur
151. Samda
152. Santh
153. Sanwabahar
154. Saraia
155. Sarasti
156. Shauna
157. Shukraulia
158. Sibpur
159. Sidhabandh
160. Siktauna
161. Sukul Chak
162. Tirpurwa
163. Turai Dehra
164. Udaipura
165. Ugarsanda
166. Ujiarpur
167. Unwans

== Kesath ==
1. Baijnathpur
2. Dasiyawan
3. Degauli
4. Dehra
5. Jairampur
6. Katkinar
7. Kesath
8. Kharagpur
9. Kharauniya
10. Kirni
11. Kulmanpur
12. Raghunathpur
13. Rampur
14. Shiwapur
15. Siddhipur

== Nawanagar ==
1. Arap Khurd
2. Athar
3. Athar Arazi
4. Atmi
5. Babuganj English
6. Bahuara
7. Bahuara
8. Barahra
9. Baraleo
10. Baraon
11. Bararhi
12. Barasath
13. Barhauna
14. Basdewa
15. Belahri
16. Belaon
17. Bhadar
18. Bharkundiya
19. Bhatauli
20. Bhelwaniya
21. Bikrampur
22. Bisuwa
23. Burhaila
24. Chakaura
25. Chanwath
26. Chauria
27. Chhatrdhariganj
28. Dafar Dehri
29. Deoria
30. Dewanpura
31. Dhanbakhra
32. Dhanej
33. Dhapachhuha
34. Dihri
35. Dihupur
36. Dubauli
37. Dulaicha
38. Ghorsari
39. Girdhar Baraon
40. Gobinapur
41. Gorhiya
42. Gunja Dihri
43. Haroj
44. Ikil
45. Itaudha
46. Jitwa Dehri
47. Kabir Chak
48. Kanjia
49. Kariyakant
50. Karsar
51. Katalpur
52. Kazi Dehri
53. Kewatia
54. Kharagpur
55. Kharaicha
56. Kharaumiyan
57. Kukur Bhuka
58. Kunjnara
59. Lokpur
60. Mahuari
61. Makundpur
62. Manahatha
63. Mankadih
64. Mardanpur
65. Mardanpur Arazi
66. Mariyan
67. Maudiha
68. Narayanpur
69. Narhan Dih
70. Nawanagar
71. Newazipur
72. Nokhpur
73. Non Phar
74. Nonaura
75. Paniari
76. Paniyaon
77. Panrepur Pheku
78. Param Dihri
79. Pararia
80. Parmanpur
81. Parmesarpur
82. Parsaganda
83. Patar Kona
84. Pawanrpur
85. Piprarh
86. Purainiyan
87. Raika
88. Rajan Dehri
89. Ranbirpur
90. Rewatia
91. Rupsagar
92. Salempur
93. Salsala
94. Sara
95. Satohari Dih
96. Sewai
97. Sikraur
98. Somosar
99. Sonbarisa
100. Tetarahar
101. Tetrahar
102. Tik Pokhar
103. Turaon Khas
104. Turaon Patti
105. Usra
106. Usra
107. Waina

== Rajpur ==
1. Ahiyapur
2. Ahladpur
3. Akaurhi
4. Akbarpur
5. Amarpur
6. Anpura
7. Asraypur
8. Atraulia
9. Atraulia
10. Babanbandh Gauri
11. Babanbandh Manrajgir
12. Baghelwa
13. Bahrampur
14. Bahuwara
15. Baikunthpur
16. Balmikpur
17. Bamhani
18. Bamhnaulia
19. Banauwa
20. Banni
21. Bansi Chak
22. Barki Puraini
23. Barupur
24. Basahi
25. Basantpur
26. Bhagwanpur
27. Bhagwanpur
28. Bhaluha
29. Bharatpur Paranpur
30. Bharkhara
31. Bharkhara
32. Bhikhanpur
33. Bijauli
34. Birbalpur
35. Birna
36. Bisambharpur
37. Bishunpur
38. Chacharia
39. Chakia
40. Chandpur
41. Chandpur
42. Chaubepur
43. Chaubepur
44. Chaubepur
45. Chhatauna
46. Chhatupur
47. Chhitan Dehra
48. Chhitan Dehra
49. Chhotki Puraini
50. Chintamanpur
51. Dadura
52. Dariyapur
53. Dastepur
54. Dayalpur
55. Dehria
56. Deopur
57. Dewarhiya
58. Deyalpur
59. Dhanaipur
60. Dhansoi
61. Dharanipur
62. Dharmagatpur
63. Dhobahi
64. Dulpha
65. Dulphi
66. Ekdar
67. Gadaipur
68. Gaidhara
69. Gajarahi
70. Gangapur
71. Ganj Shakari
72. Ghurahupur
73. Gobardhanpur
74. Gogahi
75. Gogaura
76. Gyani Chak
77. Hajipur
78. Halka Hankarpur
79. Hankarpur
80. Harpur
81. Hethua
82. Hinganpur Satgharwa
83. Hirapur
84. Indapur
85. Intwa
86. Isarpur
87. Ismailpur
88. Ismailpur
89. Itarhia
90. Jagal chak
91. Jagmanpur
92. Jaipura
93. Jairampur
94. Jalalpur
95. Jalhara
96. Jalhara Talas
97. Jamauli
98. Jamuni Dehri
99. Jamupur
100. Jiwapur
101. Jogapur
102. Kailakh
103. Kaithahar Kalan
104. Kaithahar Khurd
105. Kakaria
106. Kalupur
107. Kanehri
108. Kanhupur
109. Kanpura
110. Karaila
111. Karanpur
112. Karma
113. Kataria
114. Kathaja
115. Katharai
116. Kathrai
117. Khadar
118. Khanpur
119. Khanpur Mafi
120. Kharaunia
121. Kharaunia
122. Kharhana
123. Kharika
124. Khempur
125. Khemrajpur
126. Khilla
127. Khiri
128. Khochrihan
129. Khoraitha
130. Kishunipur
131. Kishunipur
132. Konauli
133. Kunrwa
134. Kusahi
135. Lakhma
136. Lala Chak
137. Lalu Chak
138. Lodipur
139. Lugra Sugra
140. Madanchaura
141. Madhubani
142. Mage Dehri
143. Mahadewpur
144. Mahes Dehra
145. Makhduman
146. Maksudanchak
147. Makundpur
148. Makuriya
149. Malahipur
150. Manajit chak
151. Mangopur
152. Mangraon
153. Mani
154. Manian
155. Manikpur
156. Manikpur
157. Manipur
158. Manoharpur
159. Marahi
160. Masarhia
161. Matukipur
162. Matukpur
163. Mobarakpur
164. Mohanpur
165. Moharihan
166. Mohrihan
167. Mohrihan
168. Nagpur
169. Naniaura
170. Narayanpur
171. Narayanpur
172. Narayanpur
173. Orwar
174. Panapur
175. Pandepur
176. Pankhipur
177. Parbat Chak
178. Parmanandpur
179. Parsia
180. Pasipur
181. Patej
182. Patkhaulia
183. Pipra
184. Piprarh
185. Piyare Chak
186. Raghunathpur
187. Raghunathpur
188. Rajpur
189. Ramdhanpur
190. Rampur
191. Ranni
192. Rasen Kalan
193. Rasen Khurd
194. Ratan Chak
195. Rauni
196. Repura
197. Rupapokhar
198. Sagrawan
199. Saikuwa
200. Saitapur
201. Saithu
202. Sakhuana
203. Samahuta
204. Sansarpur
205. Sarae Kans
206. Saraon
207. Sarayan
208. Semaria
209. sitapur
210. Shahpur
211. Shankarpur
212. Shyampur
213. Sigti
214. Siri Kantpur
215. Sisaudha
216. Sisrarh
217. Sitabpur
218. Soni
219. Sugahar
220. Sugra
221. Sujayatpur
222. Sukhapur
223. Tajpur
224. Taranpur
225. Tiara
226. Tikaitpur
227. Tikaura
228. Tirkalpur
229. Trilochanpur
230. Udhopur Kita Awal
231. Udhopur Kita Checharum
232. Udhopur Kita Doem
233. Udhopur Kita Seum
234. Utari
235. Uttampur
236. kajariya

== Simri ==
1. Arazi Kashi Shingan Pura
2. Arazi Kashi Singhanpura
3. Arjunpur
4. Balihar
5. Bankat
6. Barbatara
7. Basgitiya
8. Belarpur
9. Berahimpur
10. Bhakura
11. Bhan Bahrauli
12. Bharathpa
13. Bhaudatahi
14. Bhinikpura
15. Bhirgu Ashram
16. Bijalpur
17. Bilaspur
18. Bisu Sirkhiri
19. Chakani
20. Chandpali
21. Chaukiya
22. Chhitanpura
23. Chunidanr
24. Dabauli
25. Daunpura
26. Dhakaich
27. Dhanaha
28. Dhanaipur
29. Dhanapah (Ditto)
30. Dhanrajepur
31. Dia Parmeswar
32. Diaman
33. Domanjhakhra
34. Dubauli
35. Dubauli
36. Dubauli Mahesh
37. Dubha
38. Dubha Taufir
39. Dullahpur
40. Dullahpur
41. Dumri
42. Durasan
43. Ekauna
44. Ganauli
45. Gangauli
46. Gayaghat
47. Gop Bharauli
48. Gopalpur
49. Haranpura (Ditto)
50. Hirpur
51. Imirta
52. Jagdeopur
53. Jalalpur
54. Kanspatti
55. Kathar
56. Kazipur
57. Keshopur
58. KeshopurRajpurDegree Suda (Ditto)
59. Khaira
60. Khaira
61. Khandhara
62. Kharagpur
63. Kharhatanr
64. Koliya
65. Kot (Ditto)
66. Kusahara
67. Lachhmipur
68. Lakhrawan
69. Lakri
70. Mahrauli
71. Majhwari
72. Majhwari
73. Majhwari Gautam
74. Makundpur
75. Manikpur
76. Marwatiya
77. Misrauliya
78. Mohanpur
79. Nag Amirta
80. Nag Singhanpura
81. Nagarpura
82. Nagpura
83. Nagwan Jagdish
84. Nagwan Kalika
85. Narayanpur
86. Narayanpur Bisen
87. Nemauwa
88. Neyazipur
89. Neyazipur
90. Neyazipur
91. Nikhura
92. Paigambarpur
93. Paila Dih
94. Pakari
95. Panrepur
96. ParanpurDegreeSudaPrivyCouncil
97. Parari
98. Parmanpur
99. Partappur
100. Pitambarpur
101. Pratappur Naubarar (Ditto)
102. Purandarpur
103. Raipur Kalan (Rajipah)
104. Rajapur
105. Rajapur Taufir
106. Rajauli
107. Rajpur Kalan
108. Rajpur Kalan ( Dusari Geyan)
109. Rajpur Kalan (Balipur)
110. Rajpur Kalan (Bhatkara)
111. Rajpur Kalan (Bhimpah)
112. Rajpur Kalan (Bishunpur)
113. Rajpur Kalan (Dalipur)
114. Rajpur Kalan (Dalpatpur)
115. Rajpur Kalan (Dhusari Bhan)
116. Rajpur Kalan (Dhusari Dhari)
117. Rajpur Kalan (Dilia)
118. Rajpur Kalan (Dullahpah)
119. Rajpur Kalan (Dullahpah)
120. Rajpur Kalan (Garaya)
121. Rajpur Kalan (Jagdishpur)
122. Rajpur Kalan (Kalwari)
123. Rajpur Kalan (Kamkarhi)
124. Rajpur Kalan (Mathauli Kalan)
125. Rajpur Kalan (Mathauli Khurd)
126. Rajpur Kalan (Parnahi)
127. Rajpur Kalan (Parsanpah)
128. Rajpur Kalan (Patsar)
129. Rajpur Kalan (Sultanhi)
130. Rajpur Kalan (Sonikpur)
131. Rajpur Kalan (Parnahi Khurd)
132. Ramdhanpur
133. Rampah (Ditto)
134. Rampur
135. Rampur Mathiya
136. Rani Singhanpura
137. Ranipatti
138. Sabdalpur(Ditto)
139. Sahiyar
140. Sahiyar Bhagar
141. Salempur
142. Saranga
143. Semrauna
144. Semri English
145. Semri English
146. Shahpur Gangabarar (Ditto)
147. Shikarpur
148. Simri
149. Sirkhiri
150. Sisuhar
151. Sonbarsa
152. Sorbatara
153. Sundarpur
154. Taranpur (Ditto)
155. Tiwari Gangauli
156. Usmanpur
