= Chandrapura, Buxar, Bihar =

Chandrapura
- Village
- Location in Bihar, India Chandrapura (India)
- Coordinates: 25.642423°N 84.323952°E
- Country: India
- State: Bihar
- District: Buxar
- Elevation: 74 m (243 ft)

Languages
  - Official: Bhojpuri, Hindi
- Time zone: UTC+5:30 (IST)
- PIN: 802130
- Telephone code: 91-6323
- Vehicle registration: BR-45

Chandrapura is a census village in Buxar district in the Indian state of Bihar. It is situated near banks of the Ganga river Nanijor. Chandrapura is a village located in Brahmpur block. It has a total of 766 families residing in it and a population of 5259 people as per government records.

== Administration ==
Chandrapura village is administrated by Mukhiya through its Gram Panchayat, who is elected representative of village as per the Panchyati Raj Act of the Constitution of India.

Particulars	Total	Male	Female
Total No. of Houses	766		
Population	5259	2778	2481

== Geography ==
Chandrapura village comes under Mahuar Panchayath. It belongs to Patna Division. It is located 38 km to the East from District headquarters Buxar, 96 km from State capital Patna. Chandrapura is surrounded by Shahpur Block, Behea Block, and Chakki Block to the East and Chougain Block to the South. Dumraon, Behea, Jagdispur and Ballia are also near Chandrapura. This village is on the border of the Buxar District and Bhojpur District. Bhojpur District is to the East of Chandrapura.

== Industries ==
Chandrapura has a music company named Dream Films, owned by Kamal Jee Mishra. This company is one of the most popular companies of Bhojpuri music industry.

== Transportation ==
=== Rail ===
Raghunathpur Railway Station and Veer Kunwar Singh Dharauli Halt are the very nearby railway stations to Chandrapura. Chandapura could be reached through the Dumraon and Twining Ganj Railway Stations. The major railway station, Ballia Railway Station, is located near Chandrapura.

=== Road ===
Brahmpur, Dumraon, Jagdispur have road connectivity to Chandrapura.

== Culture ==
Like most cities and towns of India, Chandrapura has cultural diversity, owing to the various linguistic and cultural groups. Festivals such as Durga Puja, Diwali, Holi, Chhath Puja, as well as some other native festivals are celebrated in Chandrapura.

== Education ==
=== Colleges ===
- M.C. College, Chausa (Gola)
- Dandi Swami Sahjananad College, Simri
- D.K.M. College, Dumri
- D.S.S.V. College, Simari
- L.B.T. College, Buxar

=== Schools ===
- M.D.A.V Public School, Chandrapura
- Upgrade High School, Mahuar
- Ganpati Chakni High School, Chakni
