= Baharampore =

Berhampore may refer to:

- Baharampur, formerly known as Berhampore (also sometimes spelt Behrampore), a city of Murshidabad district, West Bengal, India
- Baharampur, Bangladesh, a village in Patuakhali District in the Barisal Division of southern-central Bangladesh
- Berhampore, New Zealand, a suburb of Wellington

== See also ==
- Brahmapur, Odisha, a city in Odisha, India
- Brahmapur, Bihar, a city in Bihar, India
