= Maudiha, Bihar =

Maudihan, Buxar
- Village
- Location in Bihar, India Maudihan, Buxar (India)
- Coordinates: 25°26′17.6″N 84°18′59.9″E
- State: Bihar
- District: Buxar district

Area
  - Total: 1.95 km^{2} (0.75 sq mi)

Population (2011)
  - Total: 1,419 (♂♀)
  - Density: 728/km^{2} (1,880/sq mi)

Languages
  - Official: Bhojpuri, Hindi, Urdu
- Time zone: UTC+5:30 (IST)
- PIN: 802125
- Telephone code: 06323
- ISO 3166 code: IN-BR
- Nearest city: Dumraon(43.4 km West), BIHIYA, Jagdishpur, ARRAH,
- Literacy: 66.67%
- Lok Sabha constituency: Buxar
- Mukhiya (Village head): Manjusha Devi (newly elected in 2016)
- Panchayat: Sonbarsa
- It is one of more than 95 villages comes under Nawanagar Block along with villages like Tik Pokhar and Salasala.

Maudihan is a village in the Buxar District of Bihar state, India. It is 25 km from Bihiya Railway Station and 42 km from Arrah Railway Station. It is located on Arrah-Mohania Road (NH 30).

== Transportation ==
From main road (NH 30) this village is connected through Maudiha Road.

Railway connectivity for this village is at Bihiya (nearest, almost 25 km far in east), Ara Railway Station (42 km far in east), Dumraon Railway Station (almost 43.4 km far in west to north) .

== Demographics ==
The net population is 1,419, out of which there are 695 males (49%) and 724 females (51%).

== Education ==
There is a primary school and a madrasa in the village. The Indian government has also introduced various Anganwadi Kendra to provide basic education for villagers.

== See also ==
- List of villages in Buxar district
