= Nawanagar, Bihar =

Nawanagar
- village
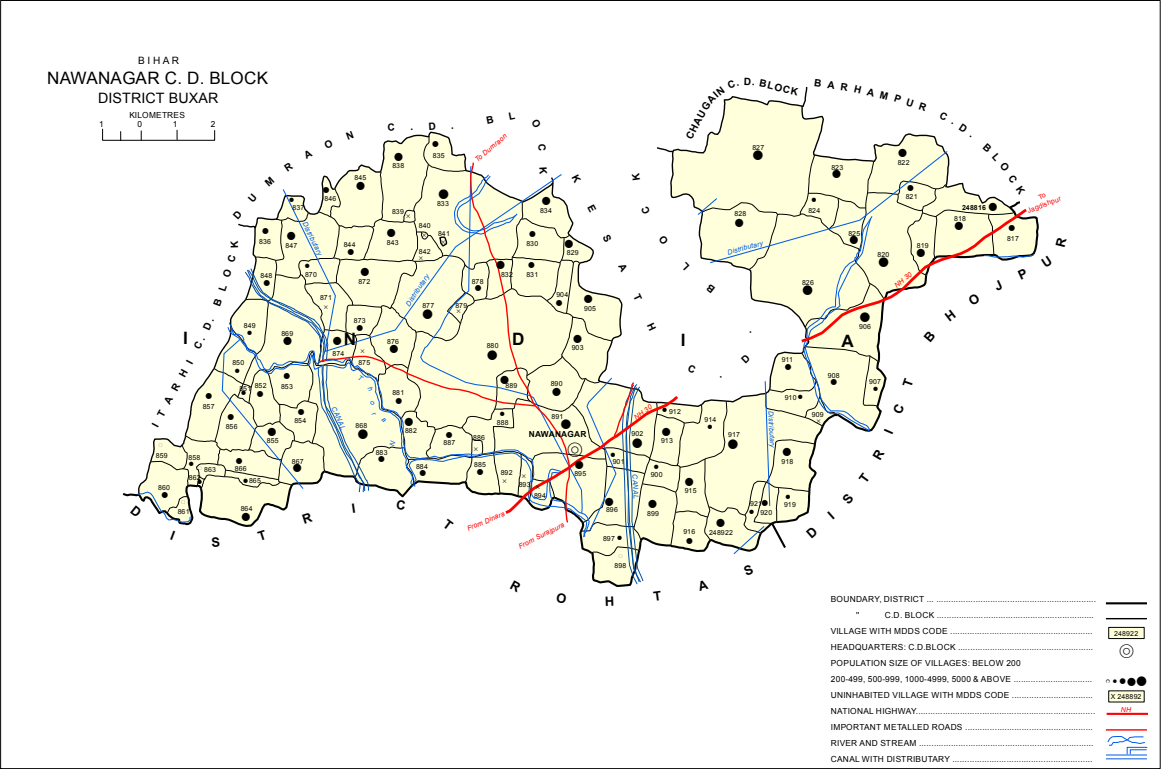
- Map showing Nawanagar in Nawanagar block

- Location in Bihar, India Nawanagar (India)
- Coordinates: 25°23′10″N 84°12′25″E
- Country: India
- State: Bihar
- District: Buxar district

Government
  - Type: Gram Panchayat

Area
  - Total: 3.901 km^{2} (1.506 sq mi)
- Elevation: 54 m (177 ft)

Population (2011)
  - Total: 8,521
  - Density: 2,184/km^{2} (5,657/sq mi)

Languages
  - Official: Bhojpuri; Hindi
- Time zone: UTC+5:30 (IST)
- PIN: 802129
- Telephone code: 06323
- ISO 3166 code: IN-BR
- Nearest city: Dumraon
- Literacy: 61%
- Lok Sabha constituency: Buxar
- Mukhiya (Village head): Hasbun Nisha

Nawanagar is a village and corresponding community development block situated in the Buxar district of Bihar, India, and one of the developing settlements of the district. It is one of several minor villages governed and administered by the Nawanagar panchayat. The village has the only one police station among other nearby villages. Nawangar is one of the seven blocks making up the Dumraon sub-division.

As of 2011, the population of Nawanagar is 8,521, in 1,429 households, while the total population of the block is 166,534, in 25,557 households.

== Geography ==
The village is situated in the lower part of Bihar. Most of the area is agricultural land with rice as the main crop. Due to variations in annual rainfall, local farmers cannot depend on seasonal rain for irrigation, they utilizes the Sone Canal system for irrigation, particularly through the five main branches of the western canal and its tributaries.

The River Ganga passes through the village, which is inaccessible during the summer. The river is the nearest (45 kilometres (28 mi)) navigable inland waterway for mass transportation towards Kolkata in the east as well as parts of Uttar Pradesh.

== Demographics ==
Historical population
Year	Pop.	±%
2001	137,569	—
2011	166,534	+21.1%
Source: 2011 Census of India

Nawanagar is a rural block, with no major urban centres. The sex ratio of the block was 951 as of 2011, including a ratio of 941 among the 0-6 age group. Members of scheduled castes made up 14.59% of the block's population, and members of scheduled tribes made up 0.25%. The block's literacy rate was 66.57%, the lowest among sub-districts in Buxar district. Literacy was higher among men (78.76%) than women (53.78%).

Most of the Nawanagar block workforce was employed in agriculture in 2011, with 28.73% being cultivators who owned or leased their own land and another 52.84% being agricultural labourers who worked someone else's land for wages. 2.69% were household industry workers, and the remaining 15.74% were other workers. Comparatively more men than women were cultivators and other workers, while comparatively more women than men were agricultural labourers and household industry workers.

== Transportion ==
Nawanagar has good road communications due to development efforts by the government. A state highway passes through the village connecting Sasaram and Buxar via Vikramganj and Maliyabagh. A national highway also passes through the outskirts.

At present the nearest railway station is at Dumraon, about 18 kilometres (11 mi) from the village, which lies about 30 kilometres (19 mi) from Buxar and 120 kilometres (75 mi) from the capital city, Patna.

== People and civil affairs ==
Most villagers are employed in agricultural work but due to improper education and a lack of skills, total production remains insufficient to satisfy the people.

Although there are two government based schools and four private schools, students must travel long distances to other cities and towns for higher and modern education. The Indian government has also introduced various anganwadi kendra to provide basic education for villagers.

=== Panchayat ===
The local panchayat consists of three villages: Nawanagar, Usra and Bhadkuda and includes a total of 13 panchayat polling booths. As of May 2025 Hasbun Nisha is the current mukhiya(village head) of the panchayat.

== Infrastructure ==
The village does not have a comprehensive electricity supply but through the efforts of local governing bodies, solar panels have been introduced to provide power for street lighting.

== Villages ==
Nawanagar block contains the following 107 villages, of which 95 are inhabited and 12 are uninhabited:

Village name	Total land area (hectares)	Population (in 2011)
Itaudha	135.2	1,248
Usra	157.9	737
Tik Pokhar	214	1,011
Maudiha	107	1,419
Salsala	405	5,040
Dihri	69.2	840
Mariyan	342.8	3,291
Sara	213.3	1,368
Barhauna	77.3	351
Paniari	97.1	1,340
Waina	774	5,335
Baraon	1,111	11,473
Chanwath	348	3,496
Pawanrpur	60	1,206
Dihupur	141	642
Nokhpur	136	707
Basdewa	71	1,569
Athar	570	7,779
Chakaura	136.8	1,294
Panrepur Pheku	96	653
Bikrampur	101.2	514
Barahra	54.6	397
Raika	278	2,541
Kabir Chak	9	0
Mardanpur Arazi	3.6	0
Athar Arazi	6.1	0
Mardanpur	51.8	0
Parsaganda	166	1,125
Patar Kona	98	734
Kanjia	217	1,826
Newazipur	40.8	508
Kharaicha	229.9	1,999
Satohari Dih	87	820
Narhan Dih	129.9	317
Makundpur	101	245
Salempur	35.6	461
Parmesarpur	110.9	531
Kunjnara	119.8	757
Dhanej	112.1	524
Dafar Dehri	102	1,323
Gorhiya	143.3	687
Arap Khurd	197.9	798
Narayanpur	67.6	401
Rajan Dehri	63.2	60
Bararhi	143	708
Chhatrdhariganj	35.6	168
Kharagpur	17.9	229
Kariyakant	36.4	110
Babuganj English	236	2,072
Purainiyan	55	258
Kewatia	117	517
Haroj	158.2	1,258
Belaon	616.4	6,599
Sikraur	391.3	3,314
Dubauli	72.4	396
Paniyaon	130.3	0
Belahri	240.4	2,891
Kharaumiyan	71.3	651
Tetrahar	104.4	2,120
Deoria	85	0
Dhapachhuha	176.9	1,765
Bhadar	359.4	6,043
Dubauli	59.9	541
Bahuara	41.2	0
Atmi	1,035	7,030
Dewanpura	130.7	833
Manahatha	102.4	1,490
Ghorsari	197.4	835
Usra	146.4	888
Dhanbakhra	104.4	847
Bharkundiya	14.6	0
Bisuwa	102.4	871
Kazi Dehri	103.6	280
Jitwa Dehri	85.8	1,193
Ranbirpur	330.6	2,579
Nawanagar (block headquarters)	390.1	8,521
Bahuara	90.3	0
Dulaicha	43	0
Chauria	34.8	0
Rupsagar	308.8	4,932
Turaon Khas	211.7	1,440
Gunja Dihri	123	470
Param Dihri	120.6	91
Parmanpur	166.3	2,753
Tetarahar	96.3	276
Turaon Patti	68.8	211
Bhatauli	386.4	5,255
Kukur Bhuka	165.2	1,848
Baraleo	57.9	813
Gobinapur	198.3	1,787
Sonbarisa	289	7,311
Lokpur	58.7	444
Ikil	316.9	940
Mankadih	42.4	0
Mahuari	90.7	374
Piprarh	123.8	902
Sewai	79	486
Burhaila	116.2	2,034
Nonaura	198.3	387
Pararia	121.4	1,430
Rewatia	111.3	926
Karsar	639	5,647
Bhelwaniya	175.6	1,227
Barasath	70	216
Somosar	54.6	698
Non Phar	61.9	238
Katalpur	150	1,024
