= Semra, Buxar =

Coordinates: 25.6195°N 84.2776°E

Semra is a hamlet in the Buxar district of the Indian state of Bihar. It is part of the larger village of Garhatha Kalan, which in turn lies within the Brahampur block. The village is surrounded by river Ganga from three sides. Bhojpuri is the native language of Semra. Arahar dal and usina chawal are major products of the region.

== See also ==
- List of villages in Buxar district
