= Raghunathpur, Buxar =

Raghunathpur
- Village
- Location in Bihar, India
- Coordinates: 25.33°N 84.19°E
- Country: India
- State: Bihar
- District: Buxar
- Elevation: 58 m (190 ft)

Population (2001)
  - Total: 5,601

Languages
  - Official: Bhojpuri, Hindi
- Time zone: UTC+5:30 (IST)
- ISO 3166 code: IN-BR

Raghunathpur is a census town in Buxar District in the Indian state of Bihar. It is approximately 41 km from Buxar. Brahmpur is a large village and corresponding community development block in Buxar district of Bihar. It is known for its temple of Shiva, its religious practices, and its cattle fair. People visit Brahmapur to perform religious rituals in the temple of Shiva.

== Geography ==
Raghunathpur is located at 25.33°N 84.19°E. It has an average elevation of 58 metres (190 feet).

== Demographics ==
As of the 2001 Indian census, Raghunathpur had a population of 5,601. Males constituted 55% of the population, with females constituting the other 45%. Raghunathpur had a literacy rate of 53%, lower than the national average of 59.5%: male literacy is 62%, and female literacy is 42%. In Raghunathpur, 18% of the population was under 6 years of age.
