= Bhelupur =

Bhelupur may refer to:

- Bhelupur, Buxar district, a village in Buxar district in Bihar
- Bhelupur, Varanasi, suburban neighborhood located in south of Varanasi district
