= Harpur, Buxar district =

Harpur
- Village
- Location in Bihar, India Harpur (India)
- Coordinates: 25.642423°N 84.049927°E
- Country: India
- State: Bihar
- District: Buxar
- Elevation: 74 m (243 ft)

Languages
  - Official: Bhojpuri, Hindi
- Time zone: UTC+5:30 (IST)
- PIN: 802130
- Telephone code: 91-6323
- Vehicle registration: BR-45

Harpur is a small village located in the Rajpur block of Buxar district, Bihar. It has a total of 417 families residing in it. The population of the village is 2799 out of which 1431 are males and 1368 are females.

== Administration ==
Harpur village is administrated by Mukhiya through its Gram Panchayat, who is elected representative of village as per constitution of India and Panchyati Raj Act.

Particulars	Total	Male	Female
Total No. of Houses	417		
Population	2799	1431	1368
