= Brahampur, Bounsi =

Brahampur is a small village near Bounsi under Banka district of Bihar, India. It comes under the administration of in Bounsi (or Bounsi) gram panchayat Bagdumba of Banka district.

The local language is Angika. The Pin Code is 813104. This village consist 70% population of Brahmins. There are more than 100 houses and 90% of them are cement and rest are huts. The population is nearly 400.

According to 2011 census, Individuals from the Scheduled Caste community make up around 10.89% of the total population, while those belonging to the Scheduled Tribe community account for about 0.08%.

This village is surrounded by land and fields with different kinds of trees, which makes the air and environment pure and fresh. Brahampur bounded with a few villages: Sirai, Barmania, Rani and Acharaj.
