= Brahmpur, Bihar =

Brahmpur
- Village
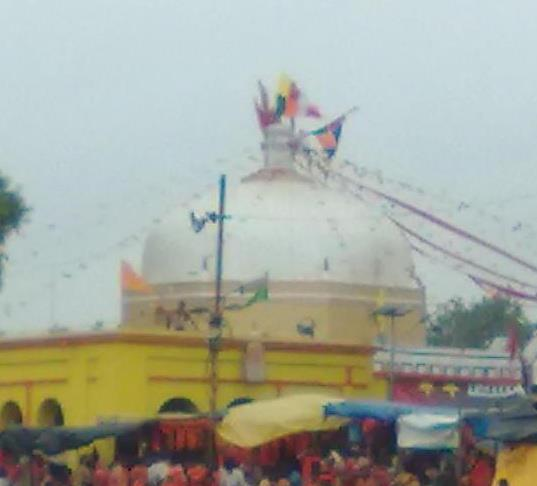

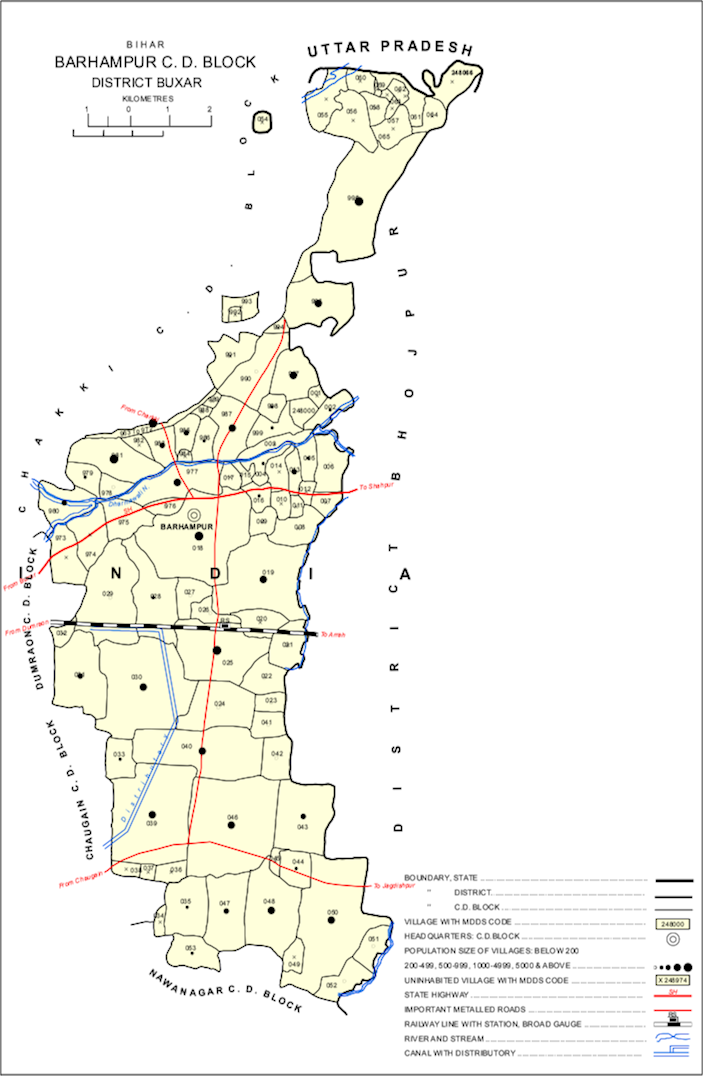
- Map of Brahmapur in Brahmapur block

- Location in Buxar, Bihar, India
- Coordinates: 25°35′51.937″N 84°18′2.414″E
- Country: India
- State: Bihar
- District: Buxar
- Elevation: 58 m (190 ft)

Population (2011)
  - Total: 13,727

Languages
  - Official: Hindi
  - Local: Bhojpuri
- Time zone: UTC+5:30 (IST)
- Postal code: 802112
- ISO 3166 code: IN-BR
- Website: www.brahampurbuxar.com

Brahmpur is a large village and corresponding community development block in Buxar district of Bihar. It is known for its temple of Shiva, its religious practices, and its cattle fair. People visit Brahmapur to perform religious rituals in the temple of Shiva.

As of 2011, the population of Brahmapur was 17,057, in 2,554 households, while the total population of the block was 196,070, in 28,826 households.

== Etymology ==
Brahmapur means "the place of Brahma" in Sanskrit. According to Hindu Itihas, the town was founded by Brahma, giving rise to the name Brahmapur ("Brahma" stands for Brahma and "pur" means place).

The inhabitants of Brahmapur speak the Bhojpuri dialect. In Bhojpuri, the city is sometimes referred to as Barahmpur.

== History ==
In Medieval India, an Islamic invader from Afghanistan Ghaznavi came to destroy the temple and loot its wealth. The people of the village warned him that if he performed these violent acts, Shiva’s third eye would burn him to ashes. Ghaznavi told the people that no such god existed and if it existed, the entrance of the temple would change its direction from east to west. (Every temple of Lord Shankar had its door facing east.) He then informed them that if that were to occur, he would leave the temple untouched and would never return. The next morning, when Ghaznavi came to destroy the temple, he was surprised to see the entrance of the temple had changed from east to west. He left the temple as he had promised.

== Demographics ==
According to the 2011 Indian census, Brahmapur had a population of approximately 13,727: 7,328 males and 6,399 females. The number of households in Brahmapur was 1,927.

== Geography ==
Brahmapur is situated at 25°35'57"N 84°18'5"E It is surrounded by many small villages such as Raghunathpur, Purwan, Nimej, Balua, Umedpur, Ramgarh, Garahtha, Gayghat. The landscape is very flat with no mountains.

== Transportation ==
Brahmapur is not accessible directly by train. Instead, visitors must stop at the nearest railway station in Raghunathpur, which is 3 km from Brahmapur. It can be directly reached by roadways connected with the NH 922, which goes through Brahmapur.

== Hospitals ==
Brahmapur's government-allocated Primary Health Care Center is located at Raghunathpur, but there are also private hospitals in Brahmapur.

== Education ==
Brahmeshwar Nath High School provides education from grades six to twelfth and one girls college. In addition, there are two government primary schools, three upper middle schools and around three private schools such as P.L public school. For higher studies, students go to Dumraon, Buxar, Ara or other places.

== Tourism ==
Brahmapur is a center of religious tourism. Many people from the Bhojpur District, Buxar district, Ballia District and Saran District come to worship Lord Shiva or to get married in the temple. The people of Brahmapur organize a cattle fair, where farmers come from Bihar and Uttar Pradesh to purchase cattle for breeding and herding. The Falguni cattle fair is very famous in Bihar and Uttar Pradesh, and takes place in the Hindu month of Falgun. Horses, elephants and camels are also bought and sold at the fair. October to June is the best time for tours to Brahmapur. However, tours to Brahmapur during the festivals celebrated in the district can also be arranged. The main festivals of the region include Car Festival, Dusshera, Taratarini Festival, Thakurani Yatra, Buda and Khambeshwari Yatra

== Economy ==
The people of Brahmapur depend primarily on agriculture and, to a lesser extent, tourism. Recently, inhabitants have begun to leave Brahmapur in the same manner as the rest of rural Bihar, in an effort to find better work opportunities elsewhere. And there are two cinema hall and one AC cinema hall, five malls, four bike showrooms and maruti show room, five banks available.

== Languages ==
The most commonly spoken language in Brahmapur is Bhojpuri. People also speak Hindi, Urdu, and English, to some extent.

== Villages ==
Brahmapur block contains 104 villages, of which 65 are inhabited and 39 are uninhabited.

Village name	Total land area (hectares)	Population (in 2011)
Dhaf Chapra (Unsurveyed)	0	0
Badka Diya (Unsurveyed)	0	0
Pandepur Path (Unsurveyed)	0	0
NainijorDiaraPachhimTurkau	0	0
Baghaunch (Unsurveyed)	0	0
Dundh Chapra (Unsurveyed)	0	0
Pokhra (Unsurveyed)	0	0
Nainijor Diara Pachhim (Unsurveyed)	0	0
Mahaur Naubara	0	0
Sapahi (Unsurveyed)	0	0
Manipur (Unsurveyed)	0	0
Kisagar	214	338
Ranipur	209	0
Garhatha Khurd	158	1,358
Ramgarh	57	728
Nimej	350.8	6,482
Garhatha Kalan	68.3	1,503
Bojhwalia	96	1,823
Jogia	204	3,322
Gayghat	350	8,633
Nandpur	50	559
Balua	114	3,193
Chaube Chak	15.4	785
Bairia	96.3	4,007
Panrepur	89	1,866
Udhaura	270	4,101
Parnahi	25.9	369
Dallupur	12.6	199
Chakani	314.4	963
Ekdar	181.8	175
Milki Bisupur	0	0
Bisupur	0	0
Bahduri	37	0
Nainijor	973.3	25,004
Mahuar	359	6,421
Chandarpura	208.4	5,259
Harnathpur	68.4	2,060
Hathilpur	122.2	2,063
Kapurpur	73.3	947
Jaipur	30	350
Umedpur	91.9	2,407
Dhadha	117	0
Kathia	33.2	1,779
Dubauli	93.4	1,635
Kuawan	170	673
Maharajganj	59.4	437
Karanpura	164.1	0
Arjunpur	77	0
Basudharpah	57.1	0
Rupah	34	0
Bhojwalia	36	0
Gahauna	62	3,176
Dekuli	84.6	0
Dhan Chhapra	53	809
Purwa	98.7	2,215
Dhebani	56.7	249
Brahmapur (Block headquarters)	906.9	17,057
Kant	643.9	6,004
Madhukara	152.2	0
Menhmarara	158.6	0
Baswar	150.9	1,789
Pakrahi	66.8	187
Rajpur	361	1,721
Raghunathpur	563.8	11,857
Dhorhanpura	91.4	688
Bharkhar	134.4	1,242
Adharpa	429.8	1,268
Rahthua	593	2,108
Kaithi	918	6,800
Dharauli	431.4	3,444
Babhani	61.1	0
Khochariyawan	149	2,047
Pahari Chak	27.9	331
Bhadsari	280.4	1965
Ghanshampur	59	353
Sukalpura	23.1	235
Palatpura	44.9	115
Ekrasi	885.8	5,100
Pokharhan	663.3	4,350
Piprarh	106.8	1,009
Akorhi	159.4	938
Baruhan	443.9	3,267
Kurthiya	119	1,602
Atrauliya	30	0
Bagen	933	5,291
Bhada	379.2	4,564
Bararhi	505	5,374
Churamanpur	72	0
Bhadwar	922.7	5,318
Ramdiha	117.4	990
Kodai	137	1,239
Choubey Bala Gangbarar	37	0
Gaighat (Part)	197.4	0
Rudrapur	242.9	0
Chak Pheralal	21	0
Chulhan Chak	48.6	0
Pirthi Chapra (Part)	31.9	0
Baghi	78.6	0
Dangrabad	133.1	0
Ghinhu Chapra (Sukul Chapra)	47.6	0
Ghinhu Chapra	40.6	0
Chak Durjanpur	83.2	0
Jug Chapra	131	0
Maji Karanpur	0	0

== See also ==
- Brahampur (Vidhan Sabha constituency)
