= Dumri, Buxar =

Dumri
- Village
- Location in Bihar, India Dumri (India)
- Coordinates: 25.624327°N 84.180936°E
- Country: India
- State: Bihar
- District: Buxar
- Elevation: 74 m (243 ft)

Languages
  - Official: Bhojpuri, Hindi
- Time zone: UTC+5:30 (IST)
- PIN: 802120
- Telephone code: 91-6323
- Vehicle registration: BR-45

Dumri is a village in the Buxar district of Bihar state in India. It is located 25 km east of the district headquarters Buxar. It is situated 8 km from Simri and 111 km from the state capital Patna. It has a total of 1207 families residing. Dumri has a population of 8794 as per government records.

The village is the birthplace of Kamlbash Kunwar, a celebrated Bhojpuri folk singer, renowned for his mastery of Dugola singing, and a distinguished public figure who has also served as an elected Zila Parishad member. He has been elected 4 times as a zila parishad and he has experience of over 50 years of folk singing

Dumri is surrounded by Dumraon block towards the south, Brahmpur block towards the east, Dubhar block towards the north, and Ballia block towards the north. Ballia District Ballia is north of this place. It is near the Uttar Pradesh state border.

D. K. M. College Dumri and KP High School Dumri are located there.

== Administration ==
Dumri village is administrated by Mukhiya through its gram panchayat, who is the elected representative of village as per constitution of India and Panchyati Raj Act.

Particulars	Total	Male	Female
Total no. of houses	1207		
Population	8794	4608	4186

== See also ==
- Buxar
- Bihar
