= Bhelupur, Buxar district =

Bhelupur
- Village
- Location in Bihar, India Bhelupur (India)
- Coordinates: 25.432152°N 83.916006°E
- Country: India
- State: Bihar
- District: Buxar
- Elevation: 74 m (243 ft)

Languages
  - Official: Hindi
  - Additional official: Urdu
  - Regional: Bhojpuri
- Time zone: UTC+5:30 (IST)
- PIN: 802114
- Telephone code: 91-6184
- Vehicle registration: BR-45

Bhelupur is a village in Buxar district of Bihar state, India. The village falls under the administrative jurisdiction of Itarhi Community Development Block, and is about 125 km from Patna, the capital city of Bihar. It has total 176 families residing. Bhelupur has population of 1127 as per government records.

The village came into limelight when Kamla Persad-Bissessar, the seventh Prime Minister of Trinidad and Tobago visited the village on 11 January 2012. Some of her ancestors had migrated to Trinidad and Tobago from this village about a century ago.

== Administration ==
Bhelupur village is administrated by Mukhiya through its Gram Panchayat, who is elected representative of village as per constitution of India and Panchyati Raj Act.

Particulars	Total	Male	Female
Total No. of Houses	176		
Population	1127	593	534
