= Ananda Prasad =

Indian biochemist (1928–2022)

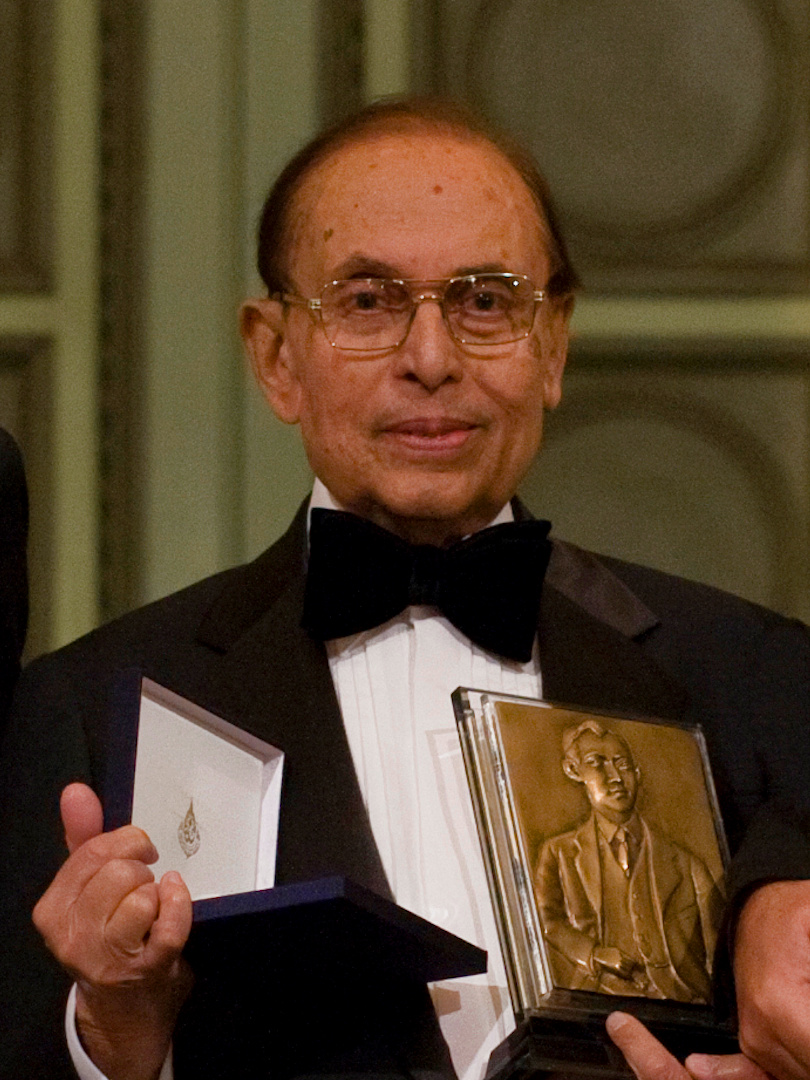
- Ananda Prasad in 2011
- Born: Ananda Shiv Prasad; 1928; Buxar, Bihar and Orissa Province, British Raj
- Died: February 5, 2022 (aged 94)
- Education: University of Minnesota
- Occupation: Doctor
- Employer: Wayne State University

Ananda Shiv Prasad (1928 – February 5, 2022) was an Indian-born American doctor specialising in the role of zinc in the human metabolism.

== Biography ==
Prasad was born in Buxar, Bihar, British Raj in 1928. He studied first at Patna Medical College in Bihar, before going on to take his doctorate at the University of Minnesota. He worked in Iran before moving to the United States, joining Wayne State University, Detroit, Wayne County, Michigan, in 1963 as an assistant professor of medicine and director of haematology. He held the latter post until 1984, and later served as director of research for the Department of Internal Medicine.

His main area of research has been the role of trace elements in the human body. He is regarded as the foremost researcher on zinc metabolism, and has received several honors, including a mastership from the American College of Physicians–American Society of Internal Medicine.

Prasad died on February 5, 2022, at the age of 94.
