= Simri, Buxar =

Village in Bihar, India

Simri Simari
- village
- Simri
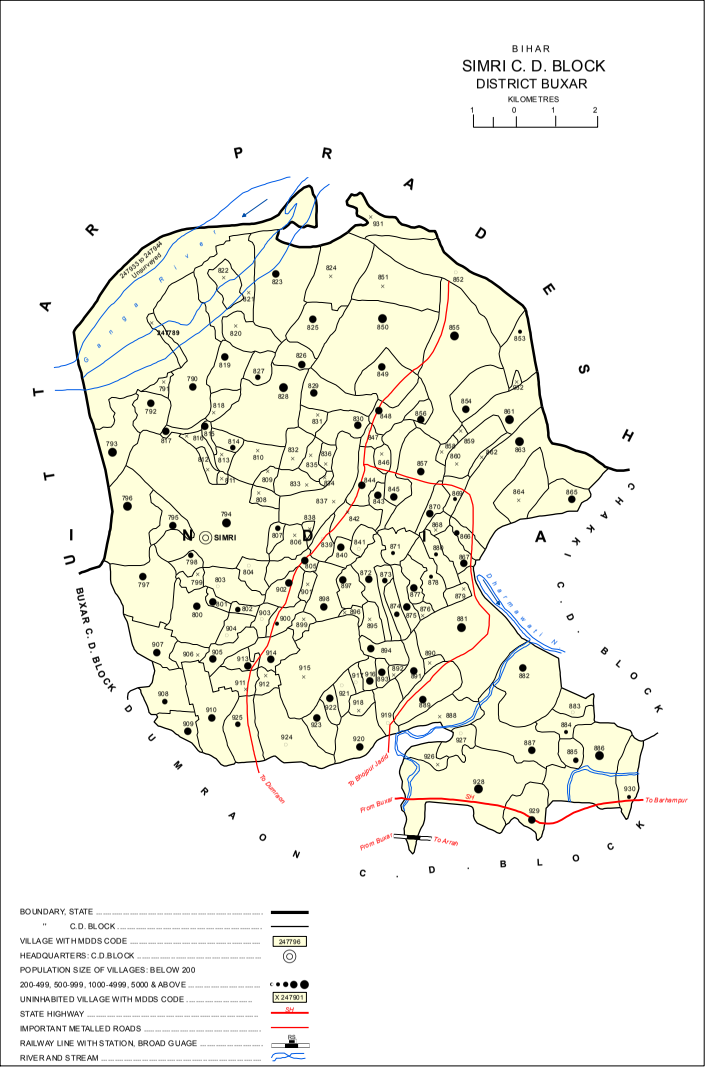
- Map of Simri in Simri block

- Location in Buxar, Bihar, India
- Coordinates: 25.64049°N 84.11951°E
- Country: India
- State: Bihar
- District: Buxar

Area
  - Total: 8.518 km^{2} (3.289 sq mi)
- Elevation: 66 m (217 ft)

Population (2011)
  - Total: 17,670
  - Density: 2,074/km^{2} (5,373/sq mi)

Languages
  - Official: Hindi
  - Local: Bhojpuri
- Time zone: UTC+5:30 (IST)
- PIN: 802135

Simri is a village and corresponding community development block in Buxar district of Bihar, India.

As of 2011, the population of Simri was 17,670, in 2,621 households, while the total population of Simri block was 207,225, in 30,388 households.

== Demographics ==
Historical population
Year	Pop.	±%
2001	181,003	—
2011	207,225	+14.5%
Source: 2011 Census of India

Simri is a rural block, with no urban centres. Between 2001 and 2011, it experienced the lowest rate of population growth among blocks in Buxar district. As of 2011, the block sex ratio was 909, lower than the district ratio of 922. The sex ratio among the 0-6 age group was higher, at 921, although still somewhat lower than the district ratio of 934. Members of scheduled castes made up 10.86% of block residents, and members of scheduled tribes made up 2.83 (the latter being the highest among blocks in Buxar district). The block's literacy rate was 68.3% (79.53% of men and 55.89% of women), which was slightly lower than the district value of 70.14%.

A majority of Simri block's workforce was engaged in agriculture in 2011, with 22.63% being cultivators who owned or leased their own land and another 48.84% being agricultural labourers who worked someone else's land for wages. 6.93% were household industry workers, and the remaining 21.61%.

== Villages ==
There are 156 villages in Simri block, 94 of which are inhabited and 62 of which are uninhabited. They are as follows:

Village name	Total land area (hectares)	Population (in 2011)
Rajpur Kalan (Parnahi Khurd)	38	0
Rajpur Kalan (Parnahi)	469	2,389
Rajpur Kalan (Kamkarhi)	21	0
Manikpur	93.9	2,922
Keshopur	320.5	5,303
Simri (block headquarters)	815.8	17,670
Khaira	72	2,835
Nagpura	329.4	5,824
Balihar	270.3	4,494
Bhan Bahrauli	58	672
Dubauli	19	0
Khandhara	179.3	1,349
Panrepur	30.8	1,693
Daunpura	33	635
Bankat	90.2	52
Dubauli	63.9	165
Parari	83.8	2,749
Saranga	65.2	0
Gop Bharauli	24.7	805
Rampur	37.2	0
Rajpur Kalan (Sonikpur)	30.8	0
Rajpur Kalan (Mathauli Kalan)	110.5	0
Semri English	27.7	0
Semri English	25.1	0
Rajpur Kalan (Bhatkara)	24.7	0
Rajpur Kalan (Rajipah)	46	768
Rajpur Kalan (Patsar)	13.8	1,836
Rajpur Kalan (Garaya)	33.6	0
Rajpur Kalan (Bishunpur)	23.5	1,287
Rajpur Kalan (Balipur)	50.6	0
Rajpur Kalan (Dilia)	114.1	1,572
Rajpur Kalan (Dalpatpur)	102	0
Rajpur Kalan (Sultanhi)	229	0
Belarpur	439	0
Rajpur Kalan (Parsanpah)	90	1,431
Rajpur Kalan (Jagdishpur)	269	0
Rajpur Kalan (Dullahpah)	133	1,797
Rajpur Kalan (Dullahpah)	67	1,137
Rajpur Kalan (Dalipur)	65.2	836
Rajpur Kalan	361.8	8,643
Neyazipur	134	3,954
Dullahpur	104	3,081
Rajpur Kalan (Mathauli Khurd)	44.1	0
Rajpur Kalan (Kalwari)	70.4	0
Rajpur Kalan (Bhimpah)	70.2	0
Rajpur Kalan (Dhusari Bhan)	29.7	0
Rajpur Kalan (Dhusari Dhari)	46.9	0
Rajpur Kalan (Dhusari Geyan)	26.3	0
Sahiyar Bhagar	226	0
Lachhmipur	12	0
Bhinikpura	50	117
Bhakura	49.9	1,209
Rajauli	31	157
Sundarpur	93	0
Narayanpur	48	1,166
Sahiyar	82	4,978
Jalalpur	112.3	1,908
Sorbatara	34	0
Kanspatti	23	88
Arjunpur	92.3	2,257
Neyazipur	172	1,704
Neyazipur	521	7,418
Partappur	254	0
Rajapur Taufir	364.6	125
Dubha Taufir	186.6	306
Dubha	150.1	1,115
Rajapur	491.3	5,196
Bhaudatahi	33.2	1,143
Ekauna	249	3,890
Imirta	28.3	0
Chhitanpura	10.5	0
Nag Amirta	134.8	0
Gangauli	207	6,433
Mohanpur	18.2	0
Kharhatanr	426	5,303
Dabauli	164	0
Mahrauli	45.1	2,009
Nemauwa	36.9	687
Nagarpura	68	1,666
Bisu Sirkhiri	29.1	0
Sirkhiri	42.7	353
Ganauli	53	1,418
Hirpur	60.7	316
Rani Singhanpura	123.8	1,294
Ranipatti	70.4	749
Narayanpur Bisen	50	502
Dubauli Mahesh	45	1,028
Arazi Kashi Shingan Pura	29	0
Paigambarpur	60.7	4,001
Nag Singhanpura	98.4	471
Arazi Kashi Singhanpura	28	0
Dhanaipur	65.6	380
Dumri	511.2	8,794
Dia Parmeswar	306	2,302
Kharagpur	51	67
Purandarpur	77.9	263
Bharathpa	49.3	635
Kathar	348.8	6,243
Diaman	272.4	3,505
Domanjhakhra	120.2	0
Durasan	136	2,511
Berahimpur	18.6	0
Kazipur	80	4,678
Nikhura	15	0
Khaira	23	1,131
Chakani	86	2,340
Kusahara	49.9	0
Semrauna	38	0
Chunidanr	57	1,155
Gayaghat	129.9	2,468
Shikarpur	27.8	0
Pakari	47.8	306
Lakri	23.9	0
Paila Dih	66.8	1,055
Sonbarsa	49	127
Nagwan Kalika	40.9	170
Nagwan Jagdish	87.2	1,596
Sisuhar	60	0
Dullahpur	101.2	4,345
Gopalpur	123	752
Dhanaha	87	1,554
Majhwari	230	3,880
Majhwari	70.1	0
Marwatiya	32	0
Dhanrajepur	55.4	1,015
Chandpali	106.4	1,640
Koliya	364.4	0
Ramdhanpur	28.5	0
Pitambarpur	25.2	110
Jagdeopur	31	0
Salempur	81	90
Rampur Mathiya	144.1	1,878
Misrauliya	40	46
Parmanpur	32.4	1,022
Makundpur	86.6	2,110
Basgitiya	263.4	138
Majhwari Gautam	143.3	598
Usmanpur	61.1	0
Lakhrawan	62	176
Dhakaich	547	10,144
Chaukiya	103	1,574
Barbatara	94	485
Bhirgu Ashram	146.5	0
Tiwari Gangauli	12	0
Bitaspur (Unsurveyed)	0	0
Sabdalpur (Unsurveyed)	0	0
Bijalpur	0	0
Dhanapah (Unsurveyed)	0	0
Rampah (Unsurveyed)	0	0
Taranpur (Unsurveyed)	0	0
Shahpur Gangabarar (Unsurveyed)	0	0
Haranpura (Unsurveyed)	0	0
Kot (Unsurveyed)	0	0
ParanpurDegreeSudaPrivyCouncil	0	0
Pratappur Naubarar (Unsurveyed)	0	0
KeshopurRajpurDegree Suda (Unsurveyed)	0	0
