= Dhakaich =

Barka Dhakaich
- Village
- Location in Bihar, India Barka Dhakaich (India)
- Coordinates: 25.312838°N 83.784635°E
- Country: India
- State: Bihar
- District: Buxar
- Elevation: 74 m (243 ft)

Languages
  - Official: Bhojpuri, Hindi
- Time zone: UTC+5:30 (IST)
- PIN: 802133
- Telephone code: 91-6184
- Vehicle registration: BR-45

Dhakaich, or Barka Dhakaich, is a village in Buxar district of Bihar, India. It is located on National Highway 922 (formerly 84), which connects the towns of Ara and Buxar. Agriculture is the main occupation of the people in this village. It has total 4,789 families residing. Asawar has population of 10,144 as per government records.

== Administration ==
Dhakaich village is administered by Mukhiya through its Gram Panchayat, who is an elected representative of the village as per constitution of India and Panchyati Raj Act. Dhakaich comes under Simri block.

Particulars	Total	Male	Female
Total No. of Houses	4789		
Population	10144	5355	4789
