= Harihar Singh =

Chief Minister of Bihar, India (1925–1994)

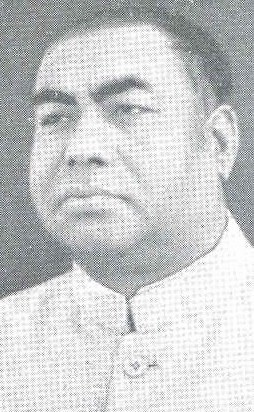

9th Chief Minister of Bihar
- In office 26 February 1969 – 22 June 1969
- Preceded by: President's rule
- Succeeded by: Bhola Paswan Shastri

Personal details
- Born: 1925 Chaugain, Bihar and Orissa Province, British India (now in Bihar, India)
- Died: 1994 (aged 68–69)
- Party: Indian National Congress
- Children: Amrendra Pratap Singh; Mrigendra Pratap Singh

Harihar Singh also known as Bihari Ji Singh (1925–1994) was an Indian politician and a former Chief Minister of Bihar. He succeeded Bhola Paswan Shashtri, as the Chief Minister of Bihar in 1969. Harihar Singh's tenure as Chief Minister lasted just a few months – he led an INC-led coalition government and all six members of Soshit Dal, a constituent party of the coalition, defected to the Opposition during a budget session of the Bihar Assembly.

== Early life ==
Harihar Singh was born in a small village of Chaugain in Buxar, Bihar in British India to a Rajput family.

== Legacy ==
He was also a Bhojpuri poet and has written many patriotic Bhojpuri poems full of nationalist ideas.

== See also ==
- List of Rajputs

== Biographies ==
- Anugrah Abhinandan Granth samiti. 1947 Anugrah Abhinandan Granth. Bihar.
- Anugrah Narayan centenary year celebration Committee. 1987. Bihar Bibhuti: Vayakti Aur Kriti , Bihar.
- Bimal Prasad (editor). 1980. A Revolutionary's Quest: Selected Writings of Jayaprakash Narayan. Oxford University Press, Delhi.
