= Gupteshwar Pandey =

Former Indian Police Service officer and politician (born 1961)

- Born: 11 February 1961 (age 65); Geruabandh Village, Buxar
- Education: Patna University
- Occupations: Former civil servant, IPS officer
- Political party: Janata Dal (United) (since 2020)
- Police career
- Country: India
- Allegiance: Indian Police Service
- Department: Bihar Police
- Service years: 1987 - 2020
- Status: Voluntarily Retired
- Rank: Director General of Police
- Awards: President's Police and Fire Services Medal for gallantry

Gupteshwar Pandey is a retired Indian Police Service officer. He served as Director General of Police of Bihar. He has taken voluntary retirement on 22 September 2020, five months before completion of his service tenure (28 February 2021). He was succeeded by Sanjeev Kumar Singhal.

== Early life and education ==
Gupteshwar Pandey was born in 1961 in Geruabandh village of Buxar district. His village was away from basic facilities like electricity, health, education, and roads. After completing his intermediate, he studied at Patna University. He earlier appeared for the UPSC exam in Sanskrit language and was allotted Indian Revenue Service - Income Tax after which he reappeared for UPSC and joined the Indian Police Service in 1987 and was allotted his home cadre (Bihar).

== Career at the Indian Police Service ==
He served as superintendent of police in several major districts of Bihar. While serving as inspector-general of police of the Tirhut Division Muzaffarpur Range, he started many initiatives to curb crime and make police people-friendly.

== Alcohol ban campaign ==
In November 2015, the Bihar Government banned alcohol. Gupteshwar Pandey travelled across Bihar and campaigned for an alcohol ban.

== Political career ==
Pandey earlier applied for VRS (Voluntary Retirement Scheme) before the 2014 Lok Sabha election but he was not given a ticket from Buxar constituency, later he withdrew his VRS application. In 2020, after quick approval of his VRS from Governor Phagu Chauhan, an exception was made in his case with the waiver of a mandatory three-month-long cooling-off period for government servants to join politics. Pandey joined Janata Dal (United) on 27 September 2020 at party supreme and Chief Minister Nitish Kumar's residence in Patna.

== See also ==
- Chandan Kushwaha

https://newsstump.com/former-bihar-dgp-gupteshwar-pandey-who-has-led-several-encounters-against-criminals-has-taken-membership-of-jdu/
