= Rajpur, Buxar =

Village in Bihar, India

Rajpur Rājpur
- village
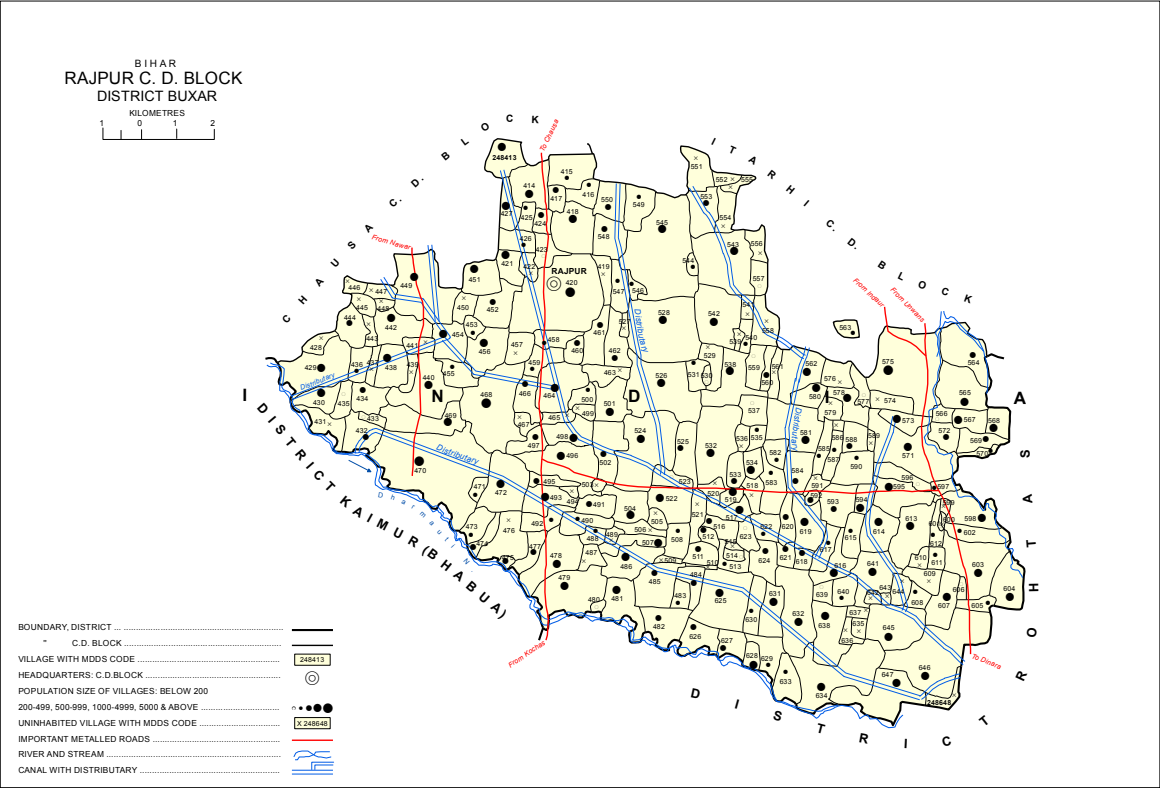
- Map of Rajpur in Rajpur block

- Location in Buxar, Bihar, India
- Coordinates: 25.39373°N 83.90345°E
- Country: India
- State: Bihar
- District: Buxar

Area
  - Total: 6.11 km^{2} (2.36 sq mi)
- Elevation: 75 m (246 ft)

Population (2011)
  - Total: 5,188
  - Density: 849/km^{2} (2,200/sq mi)

Languages
  - Official: Hindi
  - Local: Bhojpuri
- Time zone: UTC+5:30 (IST)
- Postal code: 802122

Rajpur is a village and corresponding community development block in Buxar district of Bihar, India.

As of 2011, the population of Rajpur was 5,188, in 611 households, while the total population of Rajpur block was 213,534, in 32,976 households.

== Demographics ==
Historical population
Year	Pop.	±%
2001	166,556	—
2011	213,534	+28.2%
Source: 2011 Census of India

Rajpur is an entirely rural block, with no major urban centres. The sex ratio of the block was 925 as of 2011, slightly higher than the district ratio of 922. The sex ratio in the 0-6 age group was 953, higher than the district ratio of 934. Members of scheduled castes made up 19.43% of the block population, the highest proportion among blocks in Buxar district, and members of scheduled tribes made up 0.31%. The literacy rate of Rajpur block was 70.11%, compared to the district rate of 70.14%, with 80.50% of men and 58.8% of women able to read and write.

== Employment ==
A majority of workers in Rajpur block worked in agriculture as of 2011, with 26.69% of workers being cultivators who owned or leased their own land and 60.01% being agricultural labourers who worked someone else's land for wages. 2.59% of workers were household industry workers, and the remaining 10.71% were other workers.

== Villages ==
There are 236 villages in Rajpur block, 176 of which are inhabited and 60 of which are uninhabited.

Village name	Total land area (hectares)	Population (in 2011)
Bamhani	134	1,217
Bharkhara	158	1,037
Masarhia	168	278
Dhanaipur	62	349
Taranpur	46	829
Uttampur	203	2,017
Bahrampur	71	0
Rajpur (Block Headquarters)	611	5,188
Rupapokhar	81	1,265
Makhduman	48	0
Makuriya	73	126
Bhaluha	46	884
Trilochanpur	49	253
Saraon	74	483
Raghunathpur	87	1,009
Shahpur	53	0
Nagpur	258	3,020
Gaidhara	101	1,826
Bharatpur Paranpur	104	0
Kharika	135	579
Parmanandpur	27	143
Soni	117	895
Mani	65	95
Pipra	62	382
Jairampur	35	0
Kajariya	125	1,407
Halka Hankarpur	42	0
Intwa	284	1,025
Ismailpur	51	0
Mangraon	202	3,492
Sansarpur	32	0
Kathaja	110	688
Pankhipur	47	0
Ghurahupur	40	0
Pandepur	69	0
Asraypur	20	0
Sagrawan	377	2,642
Khilla	56	0
Barupur	129	1,789
Marahi	142	768
Malahipur	50	478
Utari	146	1,329
Gajarahi	76	301
Rauni	190	1,976
Basantpur	98	0
Lugra Sugra	81	380
Saitapur	79	295
Jaipura	71	942
Chhotki Puraini	120	999
Barki Puraini	125	930
Kanpura	68	0
Jamauli	225	3,791
Jogapur	30	0
Saithu	110	971
Anpura	29	0
Dewarhiya	438	5,386
Hankarpur	204.4	1,456
Khiri	820	6,164
Birbalpur	40	311
Konauli	246.9	2,318
Chhitan Dehra	91	352
Bhagwanpur	48.2	826
Mage Dehri	174	724
Karanpur	9	0
Siri Kantpur	91	604
Akbarpur	247.7	1,933
Basahi	310	2,013
Dharmagatpur	31	28
Sugahar	162	1,167
Orwar	167	839
Mahadewpur	53	271
Jamuni Dehri	83	520
Chhitan Dehra	191	774
Rasen Kalan	177	2,509
Kishunipur	54	0
Shahbazpur	45	378
Chaubepur	21	0
Ahiyapur	92	409
Saikuwa	68	780
Jalhara Talas	88	357
Jalhara	127	1,588
Narayanpur	24	0
Tirkalpur	53	852
Tiara	285	4,725
Baghelwa	87	933
Manoharpur	139	1,955
Dastepur	30	0
Makundpur	60	354
Sakhuana	150	1,618
Akaurhi	171	923
Chandpur	17	0
Bahuwara	150	1,345
Deopur	40	0
Mahes Dehra	60	0
Rasen Khurd	81.7	1,299
Chandpur	87	367
Hinganpur Satgharwa	18.2	0
Sugra	16	0
Mohrihan	67	765
Mohrihan	49	844
Khempur	71	214
Balmikpur	21	45
Panapur	9	0
Shyampur	62	530
Chhatauna	116	2,021
Isarpur	68	0
Parbat Chak	41	1,111
Bisambharpur	55	0
Baikunthpur	24	0
Dadura	147	1,469
Chintamanpur	68	189
Harpur	418	2,799
Ismailpur	122	709
Kanehri	409	2,259
Manipur	15	0
Piprarh	450	1,747
Lodipur	72	0
Khanpur Mafi	11	22
Khanpur	70	497
Banni	312	4,661
Madhubani	58	876
Dhobahi	47	1,093
Raghunathpur	46	345
Ranni	43	0
Tajpur	92	175
Bharkhara	206	3,210
Dayalpur	24	0
Bhikhanpur	43	261
Narayanpur	33	0
Kataria	286	1,916
Sisrarh	340	2,721
Kishunipur	22	469
Hethua	651	3,329
Chaubepur	39	268
Gyani Chak	91	306
Naniaura	146	764
Mangopur	117	317
Ekdar	106	677
Pasipur	100	0
Tikaura	53	0
Bijauli	136	938
Repura	72	0
Hirapur	29	0
Ganj Shakari	54	0
Tikaitpur	47	27
Jamupur	108	0
Dehria	77	89
Dariyapur	49	658
Ahladpur	42.4	0
Kakaria	176	1,480
Khemrajpur	49	215
Kailakh	213	668
Amarpur	211	2,663
Sukhapur	39	136
Mohanpur	87	1,111
Karaila	59	1,316
Chakia	89	617
Ramdhanpur	48.3	320
Sisaudha	380	2,241
Katharai	77	594
Jalalpur	84	2,372
Gadaipur	83	0
Dhansoi	509	8,088
Banauwa	77	0
Piyare Chak	51.8	118
Kharaunia	106	1,310
Matukpur	47	0
Chacharia	87	1,030
Kharhana	265	2,658
Lalu Chak	68	465
Sitabpur	120	412
Deyalpur	110.1	822
Kunrwa	68.8	256
Maksudanchak	16	0
Gangapur	63	438
Rampur	89	712
Jagal Chak	15	0
Gogaura	131	484
Bhagwanpur	49	0
Manjit Chak	16	774
Gogahi	149	906
Chhatupur	64	1,040
Samahuta	170	2,439
Sarae Kans	83	47
Mobarakpur	31	242
Patkhaulia	165	1,786
Udhopur Kita Doem	3.1	0
Udhopur Kita Seum	2	0
Udhopur Kita Checharum	0	7
Atraulia	102.7	358
Itarhia	312	2,320
Karma	164	1,604
Kharaunia	72	347
Hajipur	15.9	175
Birna	144	1,135
Indapur	63	422
Ratan Chak	41.9	0
Bansi Chak	44.2	0
Jagmanpur	73	422
Udhopur Kita Awal	31	373
Moharihan	202	1,488
Khochrihan	149	1,363
Dharanipur	83.2	265
Manian	131	1,226
Narayanpur	79	331
Bamhnaulia	41.4	688
Matukipur	139	2,273
Lala Chak	69	759
Jiwapur	47	779
Gobardhanpur	81.3	440
Bishunpur	52.6	115
Semaria	113	743
Kathrai	301.4	1,842
Kusahi	123	762
Patej	99	569
Babanbandh Manrajgir	43	1,023
Babanbandh Gauri	132	218
Manikpur	88	465
Manikpur	115	1,376
Khoraitha	284	2,259
Sarayan	101	483
Kaithahar Kalan	435	3,313
Chaubepur	32.4	0
Atraulia	24	0
Kalupur	35	0
Parsia	225	3,025
Lakhma	27	73
Kanhupur	79	481
Dulpha	188	2,393
Mandanchaura	23.2	0
Shankarpur	12.8	0
Dulphi	42.9	0
Sujayatpur	247	2,314
Sikathi	515	3,874
Kaithahar Khurd	314	3,194
Khadar	65.6	0
