= Itarhi, Buxar =

Village in Bihar, India

Itarhi
- Nagar Panchayat
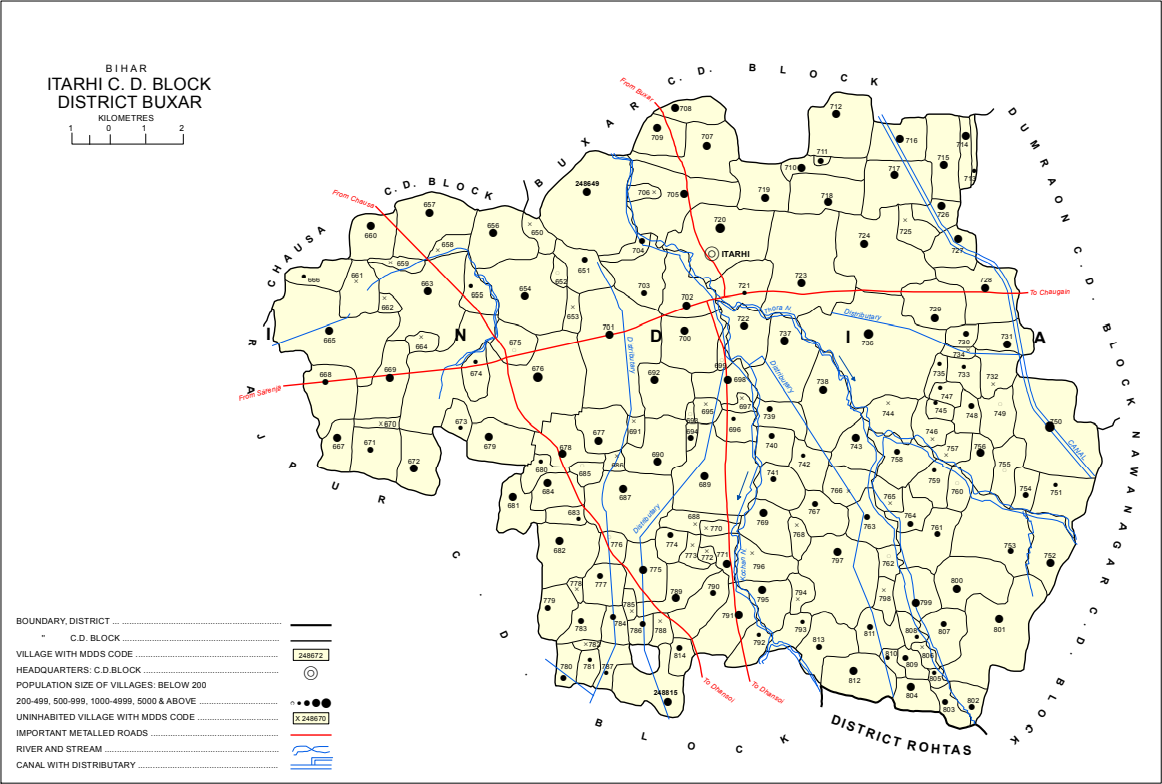
- Map of Itarhi in Itarhi block

- Location in Buxar, Bihar, India Itarhi (India)
- Coordinates: 25.48324°N 84.01294°E
- Country: India
- State: Bihar
- District: Buxar

Area
  - Total: 3.622 km^{2} (1.398 sq mi)
- Elevation: 70 m (230 ft)

Population (2011)
  - Total: 10,275
  - Density: 2,837/km^{2} (7,347/sq mi)

Languages
  - Official: Hindi
  - Local: Bhojpuri
- Time zone: UTC+5:30 (IST)
- Postal code: 802122

Itarhi (Hindi: इटाढ़ी) is a Nagar Panchayat and corresponding community development block in Buxar district of Bihar, India. According to the 2011 Census of India, its population is 10,275, in 1,711 households, while the total block population is 170,629, in 25,557 households.

== Demographics ==
Historical population
Year	Pop.	±%
2001	137,206	—
2011	170,629	+24.4%
Source: 2011 Census of India

Itarhi is an entirely rural block, with no major urban centres. As of 2011, the sex ratio of the block was 937 females to every 1000 males, which was higher than the Buxar district ratio of 922. The sex ratio was higher in the 0-6 age group, where it was 946 in Itarhi block compared to 934 in Buxar district overall. Members of scheduled castes made up 18.05% of the block's population, and members of scheduled tribes made up 1.18%. The overall literacy rate of the block was 68.77% (79.65% among men and 57.14% of women), slightly below the district rate of 70.14%.

In 2011, most of Itarhi block's workforce was employed in agriculture, with 33.64% of workers being cultivators who owned or leased their own land and another 52.04% being agricultural labourers who worked someone else's land for wages. A further 1.74% were household industry workers (the lowest proportion in Buxar district) and the remaining 12.58% were other workers.

== Villages ==
There are 167 villages in Itarhi block, 133 of which are inhabited and 34 of which are uninhabited.

Village name	Total land area (hectares)	Population (in 2011)
Atrauna	493.1	2,774
Aurahi	55.2	0
Sahipur	132.6	787
Gadaipur	26	165
Gobindpur	45.1	0
Bhitihara	346.2	2,169
Mitanpura	86.2	421
Dewasthapur	98.3	1,170
Mangolpur	235.6	1,959
Murtazapur	58.7	0
Lakshmipur	38.9	0
Khakrahi	128.4	1,134
Reka Kalan	124.2	0
Atraulia	30.1	0
Hakimpur	408	2,563
Hundrahi	38	0
Shukraulia	527.1	2,295
Reka Khurd	98.8	458
Bhelupur	98.3	1,127
Sidhabandh	176.4	770
Ghiuria	181.7	1,173
Kadipur Khurd	30.3	0
Kadipur Kalan	170.3	561
Chilbila	157.4	1,848
Kushahi	52.6	262
Baniapatpur	70.8	351
Ujiarpur	104.4	11
Kukurha	863.6	5,802
Lohandi	123	1,705
Jamuaon	160.3	1,370
Karmi	164.3	1,219
Pithanpura	60.3	287
Kharhana	128.3	1,415
Kaliyanpur	204.3	2,104
Udaipura	65.9	255
Barhana	89	1,169
Gopalpur	51	113
Sukul Chak	34.4	0
Chilhar	340.8	2,791
Girdhardpur	84.2	0
Unwans	400	3,786
Parasi	220.2	1,537
Bharparasi	29.6	0
Kanpura	172	1,495
Mahamadpur	11	52
Bhar Chakia	15.4	649
Bhikhanpura	46.5	0
Gopinathpur	70.8	406
Raghupur	22.8	0
Konch	133	1,284
Mustafapur	34	10
Baksara	222.6	2,255
Bijhaura	542.3	3,308
Khatiwa	185.4	1,675
Siktauna	183	857
Jahanpur	48.7	674
Sarasti	301.4	2,307
Isharpura	30	0
Bairi	253	1,718
Ori	137.8	1,642
Nathpur	98	1,103
Khanta	131	1,102
Makundpur	18	855
Harpur	247.2	3,167
Kapurpatti	31.2	266
Dharampur	56.4	1,434
Orap	176.2	1,625
Pasahara	132.8	1,644
Khekhsi	220.6	1,078
Basaon	176.4	2,076
Jalwasi	169.2	1,043
Itarhi (Block headquarters)	362.2	10,275
Pakri	157.8	470
Santh	164.7	1,262
Mahila	495.5	4,066
Kawalpokhar	401	1,082
Dalippur	65.7	0
Bagahipatti	77.8	2,006
Manoharpur	114.6	1,138
Narayanpur	237.6	1,798
Dehria	187	1,607
Gangapur	53	504
Bhakhwa	124.4	1,048
Parsia	94.2	0
Nahrar	67.6	454
Dhanbakhra	17	0
Tirpurwa	33.9	487
Basudhar	704.6	6,477
Baruna	260.5	1,066
Harpur	252.1	1,843
Malkaudha	82.6	546
Turai Dehra	82.6	803
Garua Bandh	100.9	591
Sanwabahar	113.8	491
Jaipur	142.7	1,091
Sibpur	117.8	0
Saraia	72.3	391
Panditpur	36.4	0
Misraulia	38.2	294
Bhaluha	55.1	533
Charaia Tikar	108.8	164
Barkagaon	468.3	6,077
Chandi	148.1	385
Mathauli	188.9	1,034
Itaunha	309	737
Kaleanpur	55.4	651
Charaia Tikar Sahi	105.6	93
Baikunthpur	106.9	1,104
Panrepur Khairi	59.4	0
Bahuara	153.2	543
Mangolpur	70.4	363
Daru Dehri	46.2	86
Chamela	177.1	807
Pauna	59.1	43
Shauna	130	843
Chameli	85.9	716
Mananpur	46.1	0
Chandpur	86	0
Gopalpur	143.7	795
Hetampur	32	0
Basantpur	150.2	1,470
Ugarsanda	23.1	0
Parsotimpur	68	1,240
Harpur	21.9	0
Binodpur	45	0
Fatehpur	52.1	580
Indaur	157.8	1,892
Dharampura	53.4	136
Kaithana	108.8	644
Dasarathal	15.8	0
Pithni	108	977
Chandu Dehra	58.1	877
Murarpur	56	467
Ramrapur	15.4	0
Chilbili	89.4	875
Raksia	63.9	671
Jah	22.8	0
Alampur	51.4	694
Raipur	68	315
Alampur	45	0
Indaur	127.4	1,236
Kasimpur	138.8	621
Karanjuwa	174.1	1,221
Samda	89	396
Rasulpur	62.1	412
Marufpur	39.8	0
Baladewa	112.6	1,184
Bhatbahuwara	139.2	0
Lodhas	361.5	2,818
Makhdumpur	45.1	0
Paharpur	115.2	1,300
Jigna	227.4	2,341
Basao	430.1	4,488
Bara Dih	63.9	661
Girdharpur	67.2	586
Goppur	91.1	1,004
Hansraj Dih	24.8	386
Nirbhaipur	33	0
Kauresari	113.9	587
Kauresar	47	314
Mohanpur	41.2	540
Indarpur	31.7	321
Nihalpur	112.5	643
Inglish	200.2	1,518
Madan Dehra	170	958
Bishunpur	55.8	645
Debkali Dharampura	219	1,571
