= Nagendra Nath Ojha =

Indian politician

Member of Parliament, Rajya Sabha
- In office 1996–2002
- Constituency: Bihar

Personal details
- Born: 1 October 1946 (age 79)
- Party: Communist Party of India

Nagendra Nath Ojha is an Indian politician. He was a Member of Parliament, representing Bihar in the Rajya Sabha, the upper house of India's Parliament as a member of the Communist Party of India.
