= Kesath, Buxar =

Kesath
- Village
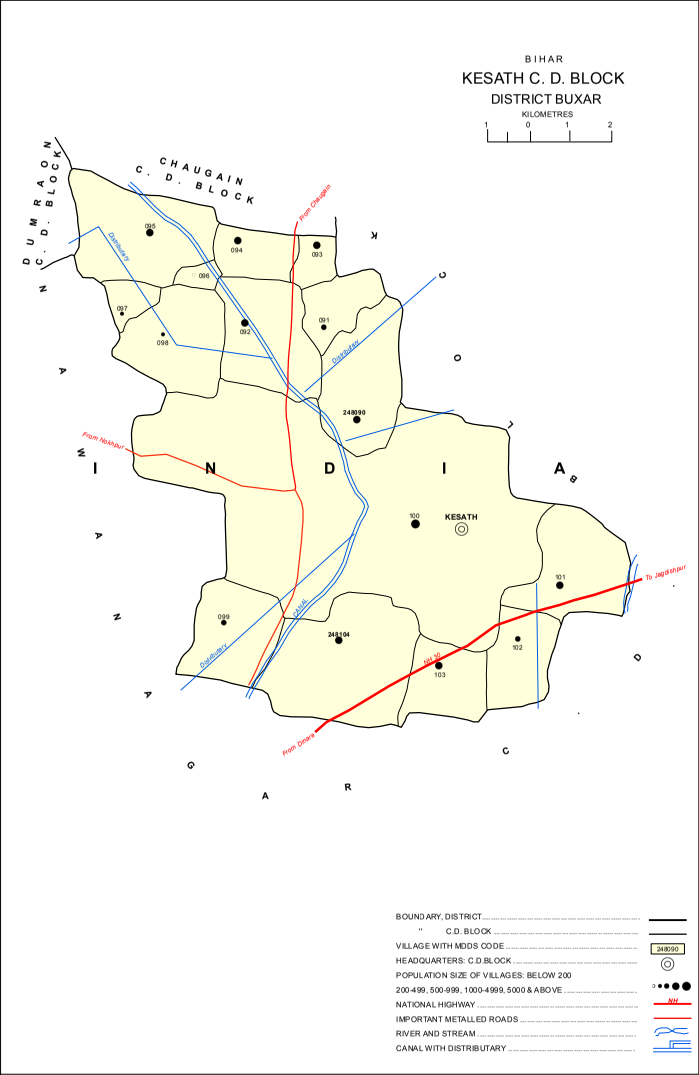

- Location in Bihar, India Kesath (India)
- Coordinates: 25.42075°N 84.2414°E
- Country: India
- State: Bihar
- District: Buxar

Government
  - Type: Gram Panchayat

Area
  - Total: 12.72 km^{2} (4.91 sq mi)
- Elevation: 85 m (279 ft)

Population (2011)
  - Total: 14,843
  - Density: 1,167/km^{2} (3,022/sq mi)

Languages
  - Official: Hindi
  - Local: Bhojpuri
- Time zone: UTC+5:30 (IST)
- PIN: 802125

Kesath is a village and corresponding community development block in Buxar district of Bihar, India. It is the least populous of Buxar's 11 blocks, with a population of 33,820, in 5,304 households. The population of Kesath itself is 14,843, in 2,351 households.

== Demographics ==
Historical population
Year	Pop.	±%
2001	28,929	—
2011	33,820	+16.9%
Source: 2011 Census of India

Kesath is an entirely rural block, with no large urban centres. Its sex ratio as of 2011 was 942 females to every 1000 males, which was higher than the overall district ratio of 922. The sex ratio was lower in the 0-6 age bracket, with 921 females for every 1000 males. Members of scheduled castes made up 17.61% of the block population and members of scheduled tribes made up 0.45%. The block literacy rate was 71.1%, which was slightly higher than the overall district rate of 70.14%. There was a 21.72% literacy gender gap between men (81.67%) and women (59.95%), compared to the district-wide gap of 22.09%.

=== Employment ===
Most of Kesath block's workforce was engaged in agriculture in 2011, with 28.33% being cultivators who owned their own land and another 40.30% being agricultural labourers who worked someone else's land for wages. Another 4.36% were household industry workers, and the remaining 27.01% were other workers.

== Villages ==
Kesath block comprises 15 villages, all of which are inhabited:

Village name	Total land area (hectares)	Population (in 2011)
Dasiyawan	196	1,360
Raghunathpur	85	686
Baijnathpur	180	1,293
Shiwapur	33	1,440
Kulmanpur	69	1,206
Rampur	219	3,320
Kharagpur	16.8	53
Jairampur	36	386
Siddhipur	159	411
Kharauniya	146	960
Kesath (block headquarters)	1,272	14,843
Dehra	185	1,204
Degauli	97	573
Kirni	90	2,387
Katkinar	295	3,698
