= Chakki, Buxar =

Village in Bihar, India

Chakki
- village
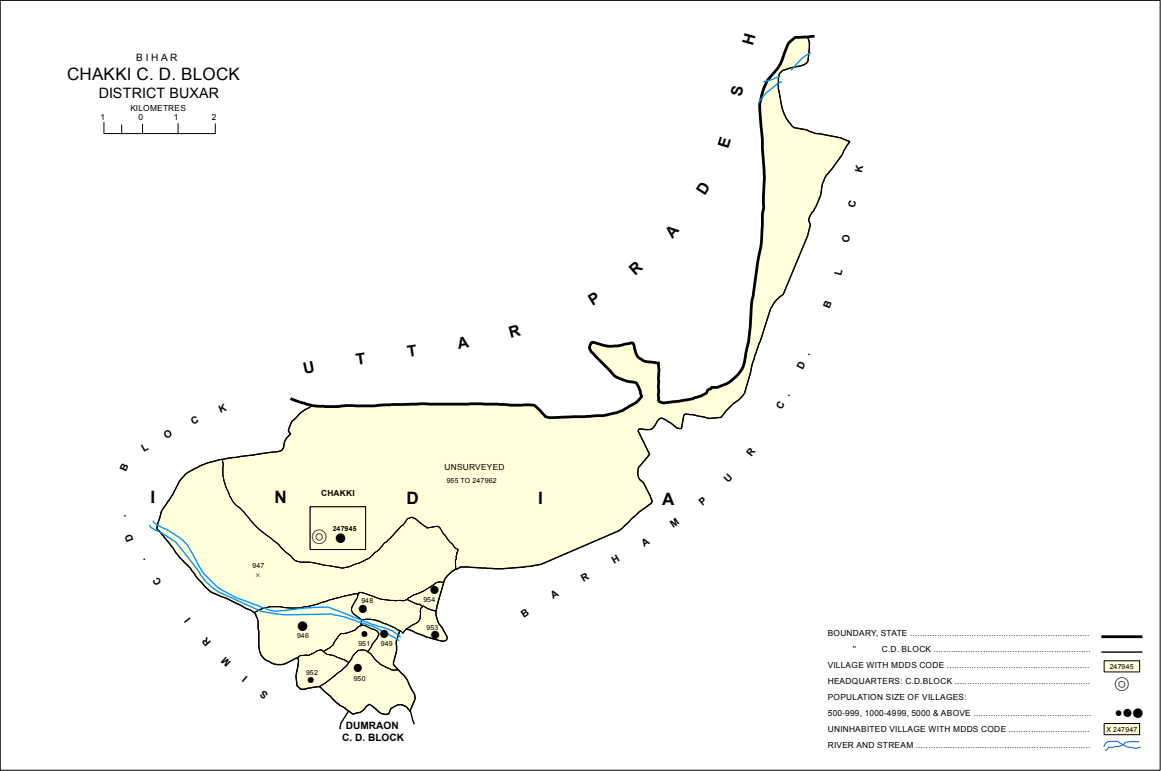
- Map of Chakki in Chakki block

- Location in Buxar, Bihar, India Chakki (India)
- Coordinates: 25.6400°N 84.2094°E
- Country: India
- State: Bihar
- District: Buxar

Population (2011)
  - Total: 18,167

Languages
  - Official: Hindi
  - Local: Bhojpuri
- Time zone: UTC+5:30 (IST)
- Postal code: 802120

Chakki, also Charkhi, is a village and corresponding community development block in Buxar district of Bihar, India.

As of 2011, the population of Chakki was 18,167, in 2,311 households, and the overall block population was 42,556, in 5,920 households.

== Demographics ==
Historical population
| Year | Pop. | ±% |
|---|---|---|
| 2001 | 34,133 | — |
| 2011 | 42,256 | +23.8% |
Source: 2011 Census of India

Chakki is a rural block, with no large urban centres. Its sex ratio as of 2011 was 937, somewhat higher than the Buxar district average of 922. The sex ratio was higher in the 0-6 age group at 960, which was the highest among blocks in Buxar district. Members of scheduled castes made up 10.11% of the block's population, and members of scheduled tribes made up 2.7%. The block literacy rate was 67.81% (81.31% among men and 53.34% among women), somewhat lower than the district's 70.14%.

A majority of workers in Chakki block were employed in agriculture in 2011, with 35.21% being cultivators who owned or leased their own land and another 33.34% being agricultural labourers who worked another person's land for money. 4.99% were household industry workers, and the remaining 26.45% were other workers.

== Villages ==
There are 18 villages in Chakki block, 10 of which are inhabited and 8 of which are uninhabited.

| Village name | Total land area (hectares) | Population (in 2011) |
|---|---|---|
| Chakki (block headquarters) | 0 | 18,167 |
| Arak | 277.9 | 6,147 |
| Sheopur Diara | 0 | 0 |
| Parsia | 99.9 | 2,692 |
| Bhariar | 59 | 2,660 |
| Chanda | 196.7 | 2,946 |
| Bedauli | 57.2 | 708 |
| Henwan | 78.5 | 982 |
| Hemdapur | 43 | 1,067 |
| Liladharpur | 28 | 1,051 |
| Minapur | 0 | 0 |
| Jawahar Diara | 0 | 5,836 |
| Sheopur Diar Janubi | 0 | 0 |
| Jawahi | 0 | 0 |
| Kalyanpur | 0 | 0 |
| Sheopur Diar Somali | 0 | 0 |
| PranpurDegreiSudaprivi Council | 0 | 0 |
| Sheopur Diar | 0 | 0 |
