= Chaugain, Buxar =

Village in Bihar, India

Chaugain Chaugāin
- village
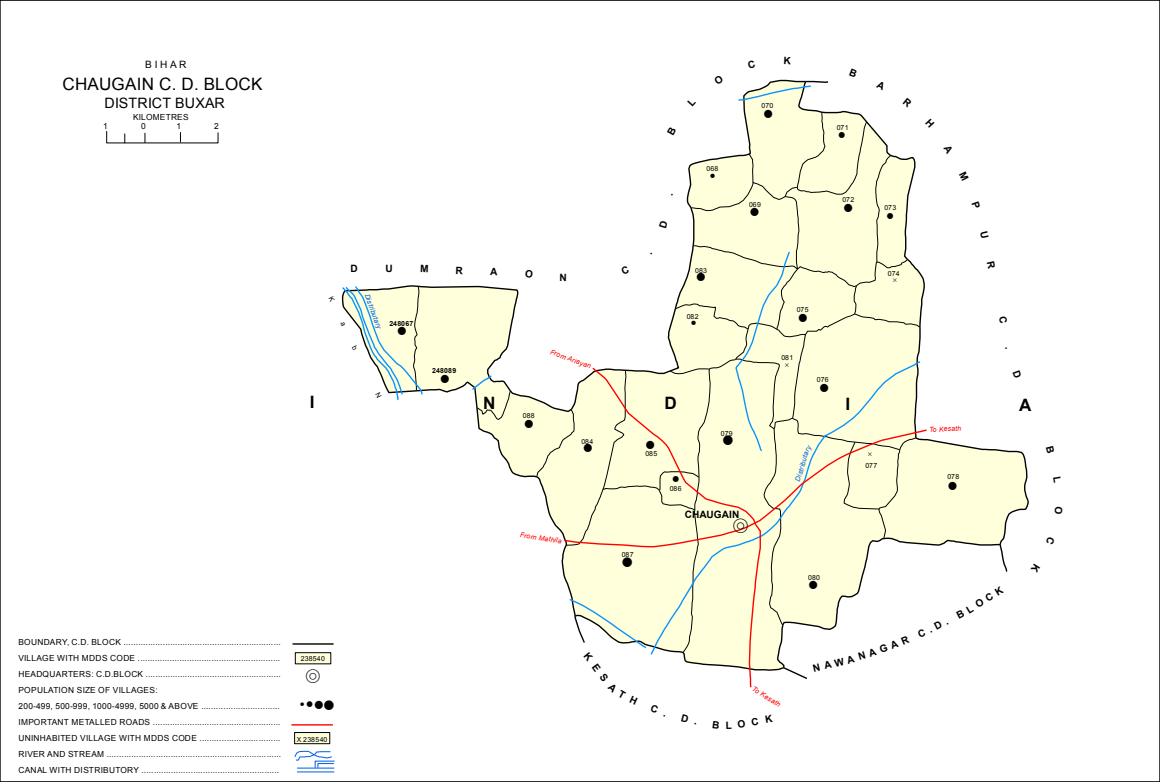
- Map of Chaugain in Chaugain block

- Location in Buxar, Bihar, India
- Coordinates: 25.48006°N 84.23285°E
- Country: India
- State: Bihar
- District: Buxar

Area
  - Total: 7.336 km^{2} (2.832 sq mi)
- Elevation: 79 m (259 ft)

Population (2011)
  - Total: 12,611
  - Density: 1,719/km^{2} (4,452/sq mi)

Languages
  - Official: Hindi
  - Local: Bhojpuri
- Time zone: UTC+5:30 (IST)
- Postal code: 802122

Chaugain is a village and corresponding community development block in Buxar district of Bihar, India.

As of 2011, the population of Chaugain was 12,611, in 2,124 households, while the total population of Chaugain block was 48,743, in 7,929 households.

== Notable people ==
- Amrendra Pratap Singh
- Mrigendra Pratap Singh

== Demographics ==
Historical population
Year	Pop.	±%
2001	42,550	—
2011	48,743	+14.6%
Source: 2011 Census of India

Chaugain is a rural block, with no large urban centres. The sex ratio of the block was 948 as of 2011, with a ratio of 939 in the 0-6 age bracket at the time. Members of scheduled castes made up 16.02% of the block population, and members of scheduled tribes made up 0.61%. The literacy rate of Chaugain block was 69.43%, including 80.89% among men and 57.27% among women.

Most workers in Chaugain worked in agriculture in 2011, with 29.69% being cultivators who owned or leased their own land and a further 55.02% being agricultural labourers who worked someone else's land for wages. 2.29% were household industry workers, and the remaining 13.01% were other workers.

== Villages ==
There are 23 villages in Chaugain block, 20 of which are inhabited and 3 of which are uninhabited.

Village name	Total land area (hectares)	Population (in 2011)
Nokhpura	171.6	2,700
Reuntiya	81.3	484
Birpur	178.9	1,284
Belahri	207	1,074
Chhotka Dih	105.6	863
Nachap	263	1,938
Puraina	86	517
Parasiya	122.2	0
Dangauli	136	1,437
Ojhabarawan	435.4	3,821
Samusar	89	0
Phaphdar	364	1,662
Chaugain (block headquarters)	733.6	12,611
Masahariya	497.8	2,679
Kherhi	93.9	0
Bhadi	111	349
Mangpa	212	1,407
Thari	254	2,343
Panrepur	258	1,443
Baida	55	995
Murar	540	5,040
Khewali	155	2,800
Amsari	312	3,296
