= Buxar district =

District in Bihar, India

- District of Bihar
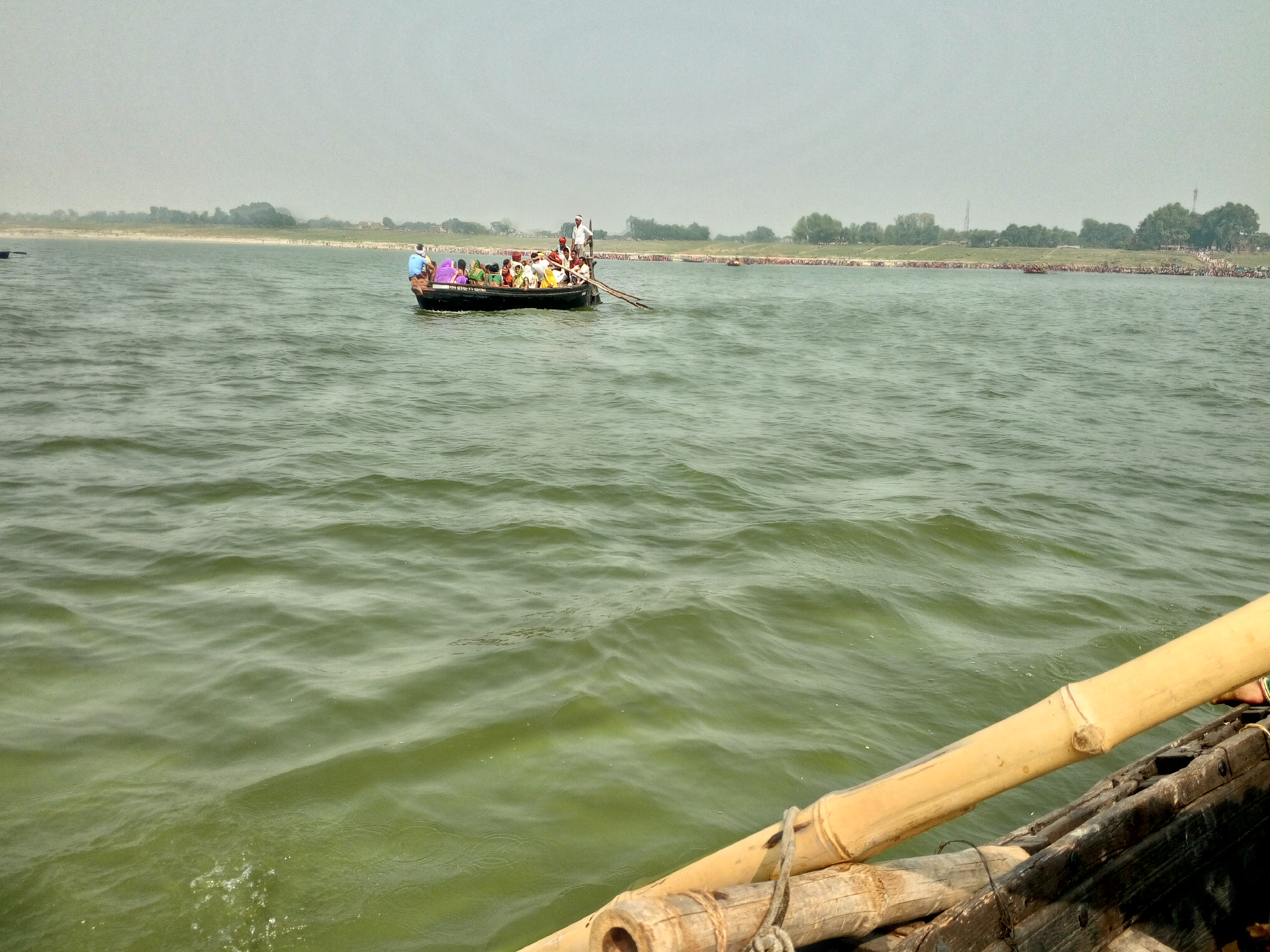
- Ganga Buxar

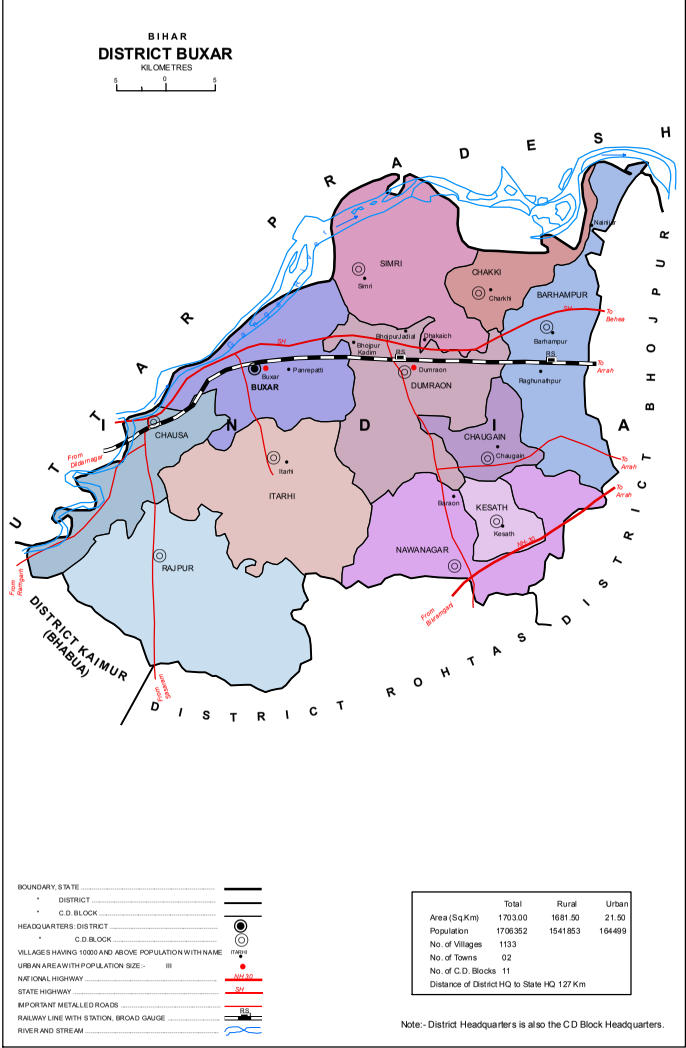
- Map divisions of Buxar district
- Interactive map of Buxar district
- Coordinates (Buxar): 25°33′53″N 83°58′40″E
- Country: India
- State: Bihar
- Division: Patna
- Established: 1992
- Headquarters: Buxar
- Blocks: Block List (11): Buxar; Itarhi; Chausa; Rajpur; Dumraon; Nawanagar; Brahmpur; Kesath; Chakki; Chaugain; Simri

Government
  - Member of Parliament: Sudhakar Singh
  - District Magistrate: Anshul Agarwal (IAS)

Area
  - Total: 1,624 km^{2} (627 sq mi)

Population (2011)
  - Total: 1,706,352
  - Density: 1,051/km^{2} (2,721/sq mi)
  - Urban: 164,499
- Time zone: UTC+05:30 (IST)
- Vehicle registration: BR-44
- Major Highways: NH-84
- Website: buxar.nic.in

Buxar district is one of the 38 districts of Bihar, India. Located in the southwestern part of the state, it is primarily an agricultural district. The district headquarters is at the town of Buxar. Buxar district was carved out from Bhojpur district on 17 March 1991, and is in the southwest of Bihar.

== Etymology ==
According to local traditions, the name Buxar is derived from a lake in the town named Aghsar (effacer of Sin), which over time became Baghsar and eventually Buxar. Another Vedic legend states that a sage or rishi named Besira transformed himself to take the look of a Tiger to frighten Durvasa rishi, and doomed by him to retain the form of Tiger forever. In order to restore his human form, Bedsira bathed in the holy pond of Aghsar and worshipped Garushankar. To commemorate this event the spot was called Vyaghrasar and later became Baghsar (The Tiger's Pond).

== History ==
The Battle of Buxar and Battle of Chausa were fought in this district.

The present district was created on 17 March 1991, when it was split off from Bhojpur district.

== Geography ==
Buxar district is located in the southwestern part of the state of Bihar, bordered by Rohtas and Kaimur districts to the south, and by Bhojpur district to the east. To the north and west, respectively, the Ganges and Karmanasa Rivers form the boundary with the state of Uttar Pradesh. In Uttar Pradesh, the district of Ballia is to the north and west of Buxar and that of Ghazipur lies to the west.)

Buxar district covers an area of 1,703km^{2}, roughly 1.8% of the total area of Bihar, making it the 30th largest district in the state by area. Much of the district consists of an alluvial plain, gently sloping downward toward the northeast, with a height ranging from 71m above sea level in the south to 66m in the north. The soil consists of ultisols, ochrepts, orthents, fluvents, and psamments.

The district originally had large areas of forest cover, but deforestation caused by clearing land for agriculture has significantly reduced its area. This has also caused wildlife in the area to dramatically decline in numbers. Common trees in the forests of Buxar district are mango, seasum, mahua, and bamboo. Their main human use is as firewood. Additionally, long jhalas grass grows near the Ganges and is used to make roofs for kuccha houses.

== Demographics ==
Historical population
Year	Pop.	±% p.a.
1901	391,371	—
1911	371,963	−0.51%
1921	362,231	−0.26%
1931	398,022	+0.95%
1941	464,919	+1.57%
1951	536,754	+1.45%
1961	635,988	+1.71%
1971	765,094	+1.87%
1981	916,886	+1.83%
1991	1,087,676	+1.72%
2001	1,402,396	+2.57%
2011	1,706,352	+1.98%

Religions in Buxar district (2011)
Religion	Percent
Hinduism	93.27%
Islam	6.18%
Other or not stated	0.55%

According to the 2011 census, Buxar district has a population of 1,706,352 (roughly equal to the nation of The Gambia or the US state of Nebraska). This gives it a ranking of 285th in India (out of a total of 640). With 1.6% of the total population of Bihar, Buxar district is ranked 29th in the state by population. The district has a population density of 1,003 inhabitants per square kilometre (2,600/sq mi) . Its population growth rate over the decade 2001-2011 was 21.67%. Buxar has a sex ratio of 922 females for every 1,000 males, and a literacy rate of 70.14%. 9.64% of the population lives in urban areas. Scheduled Castes and Scheduled Tribes make up 14.75% and 1.57% of the population respectively.

=== Languages ===
Languages of Buxar district (2011)
1. Bhojpuri (97.6%)
2. Hindi (1.60%)
3. Urdu (0.75%)
4. Others (0.08%)

At the time of the 2011 Census of India, 97.57 of the population in the district spoke Bhojpuri and 1.60% Hindi as their first language.

== Theology ==
It is said that Ahilya, the wife of Gautam Rishi restored her human body from that of stone and got salvation by a mere touch of the feet of Lord Rama. This place is now known as Ahirauli, and is situated six kilometres away from Buxar. The Kanwaldah Pokhara, also known as VyaghraSar, is today a tourist destination. It is in this district that sage Vishwamitra's Hermitage was situated. Chaitra Van, the forest where demoness Tadaka lived and was killed by Shri Ram, is also situated in Buxar.

According to historical records and folk stories, Lord Ram, along with his wife Sita and brother Lakshman, journeyed through the lush woods near Buxar during his exile. Their long-term impact still moves and inspires a lot of people. One of the most unusual cultural celebrations is the Panchkoshi Mela, which celebrates Lord Ram's voyage. At the heart of this narrative lie five significant paths, known as panchkoshi.During the initial five days of the mela, each day is devoted to remembering a distinct route that Lord Ram undertook. Because of this, people who are religious get the impression that they are going on a holy journey and gaining spiritual enlightenment.

== Politics ==
District	No.	Constituency	Name	Party	Alliance	Remarks
Buxar	199	Brahampur	Shambhu Nath Yadav	RJD	MGB	
Buxar	200	Buxar	Anand Mishra	BJP	NDA	
Buxar	201	Dumraon	Rahul Kumar Singh	JD(U)	NDA	
Buxar	202	Rajpur (SC)	Santosh Kumar Nirala	JD(U)	NDA	

== Divisions ==
Buxar district is divided 11 community development blocks, grouped together into 2 subdivisions based at Buxar and Dumraon. A sub-division is headed by a SDM and a block is headed by a Block Development Officer (BDO).

- Buxar subdivision
  - Buxar
  - Itarhi
  - Chausa
  - Rajpur
- Dumraon subdivision
  - Dumraon
  - Nawanagar
  - Brahmapur
  - Kesath
  - Chakki
  - Chaugain
  - Simri

Of these, the most populous is Buxar and the least populous is Kesath.

There are 1,133 villages and 142 gram panchayats in Buxar district.

The district contains the following towns:

Town name	Block	Class	Population (in 2011)
Buxar	Buxar	Nagar parishad	102,861
Dumraon	Dumraon	Nagar parishad	53,618
Sarimpur	Buxar	Census town	8,020

== Economy ==
Buxar district is mainly agricultural. Major crops include rice (especially winter rice), wheat, barley, and pulses, the most important of which is gram. Arhar, khesari, and masur are other pulses grown in Buxar. Other important crops include oil seed and sugar cane.

Industry and commerce are mainly concentrated in the cities of Buxar and Dumraon, which both have soap and furniture manufacturers as well as the main wholesale markets in the district.

== Notable people ==
- Bismillah Khan (Bharat Ratna)
- Kailashpati Mishra
- Gupteshwar Pandey (IPS)
- Ananda Prasad
- Harihar Singh, Former Chief Minister of Bihar and Bhojpuri Poet
- Lallan Prasad Singh (IAS)
- Ravindra Kishore Sinha
- Vimlanand Saraswati
- Ajit Kushwaha

== See also ==
- List of villages in Buxar district
