= Buxar =

Buxar Mini Kashi
- City
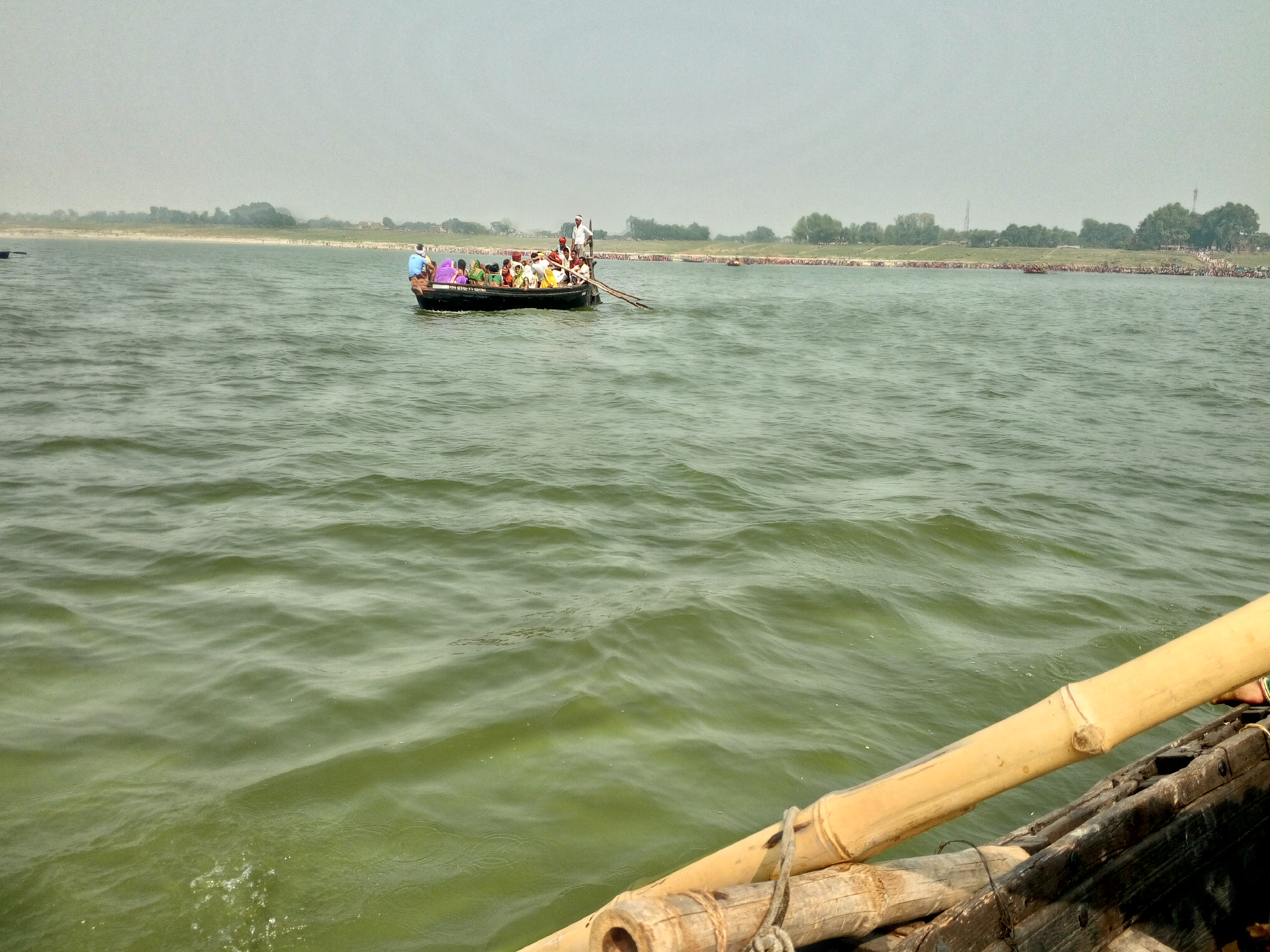
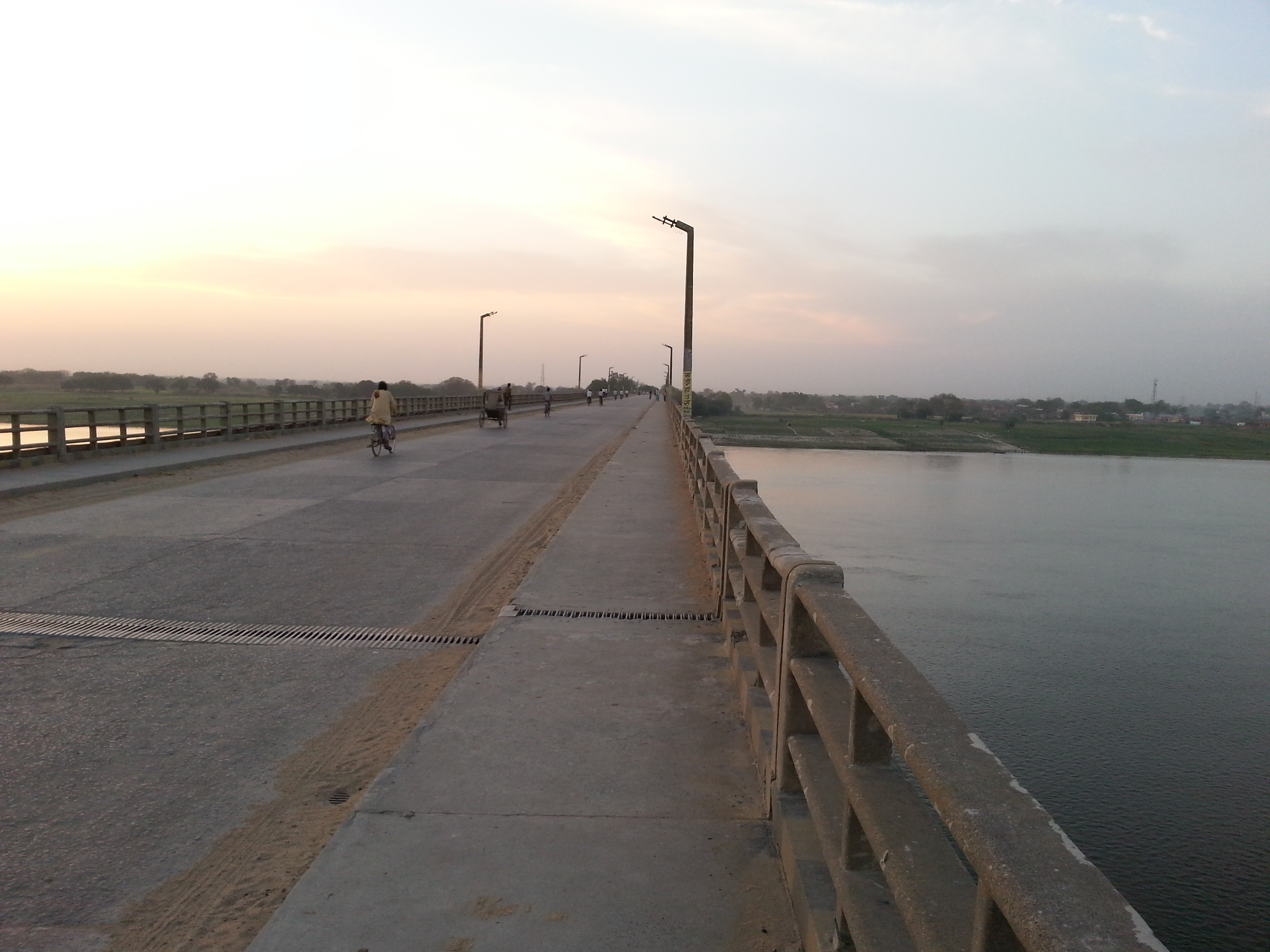
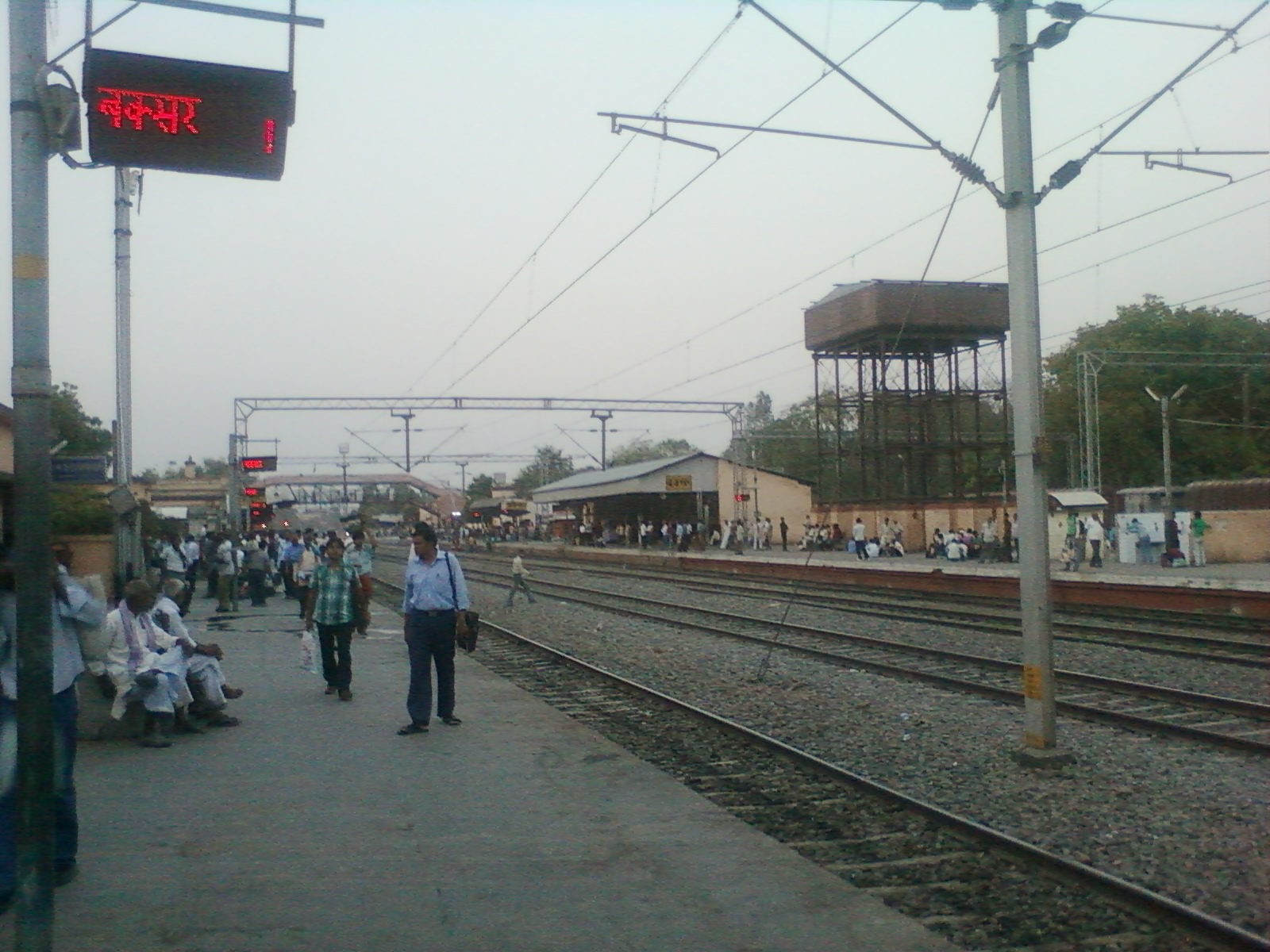
- Ganges river at Buxar, Buxar Bridge, Buxar Railway Station

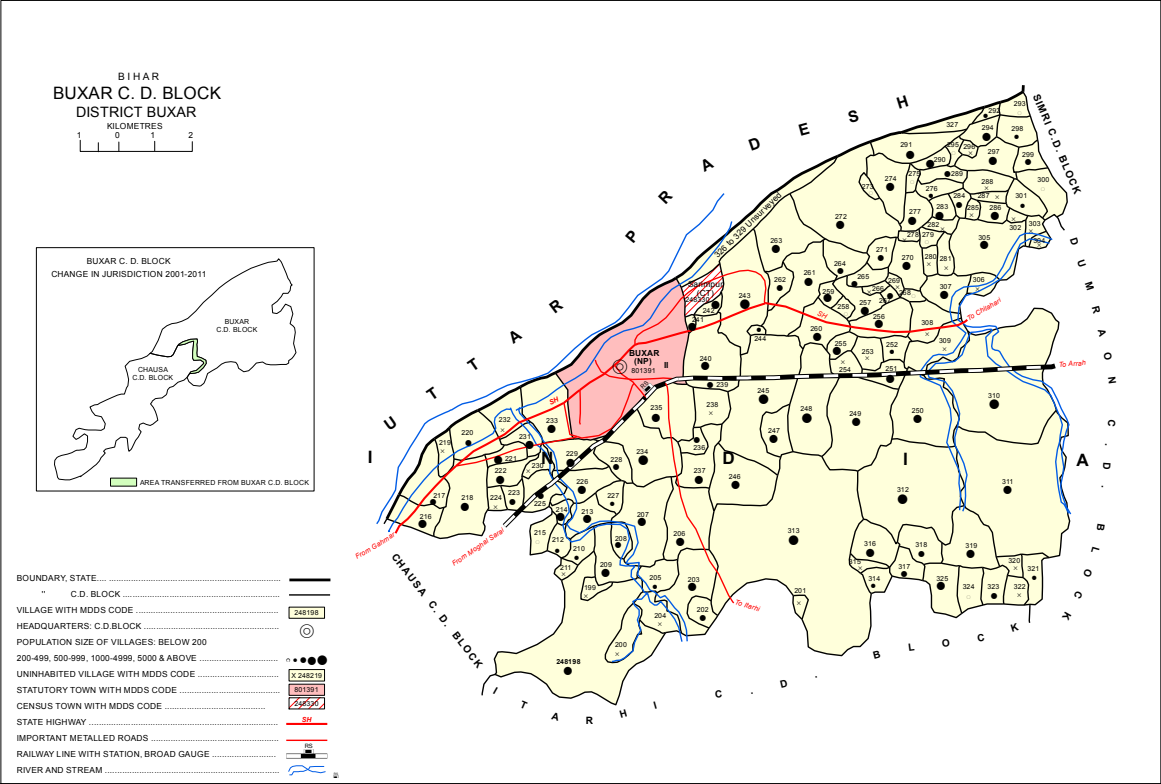
- Map of Buxar in Buxar block

- Location in Bihar, India
- Coordinates: 25°34′N 83°59′E
- Country: India
- State: Bihar
- District: Buxar
- Established: 1480
- Incorporated: 1991
- Founder: Todar & Domar Rao

Area
  - Total: 6.2 km^{2} (2.4 sq mi)
- Elevation: 55 m (180 ft)

Population (2011)
  - Total: 102,861

Languages
  - Official: Hindi
  - Regional: Bhojpuri
- Time zone: UTC+5:30 (IST)
- PIN: 802101 (Buxar)
- Telephone code: 06183
- Vehicle registration: BR-44
- Website: buxar.bih.nic.in

Buxar is a nagar parishad city in the state of Bihar, India, sharing border with Balia and Ghazipur district of Uttar Pradesh. It is the headquarters of the eponymous Buxar district, as well as the headquarters of the community development block of Buxar, which also contains the census town of Sarimpur along with 132 rural villages.

The historic Battle of Chausa and Battle of Buxar were fought in this vicinity. Buxar Railway Station lies on Patna–Mughalsarai section of Howrah–Delhi main line in the zone of eastern central Indian railway. It is approximately 125 km from the state capital of Patna. Bhojpuri is the widely spoken language in Buxar.

== Typonym and antiquity ==
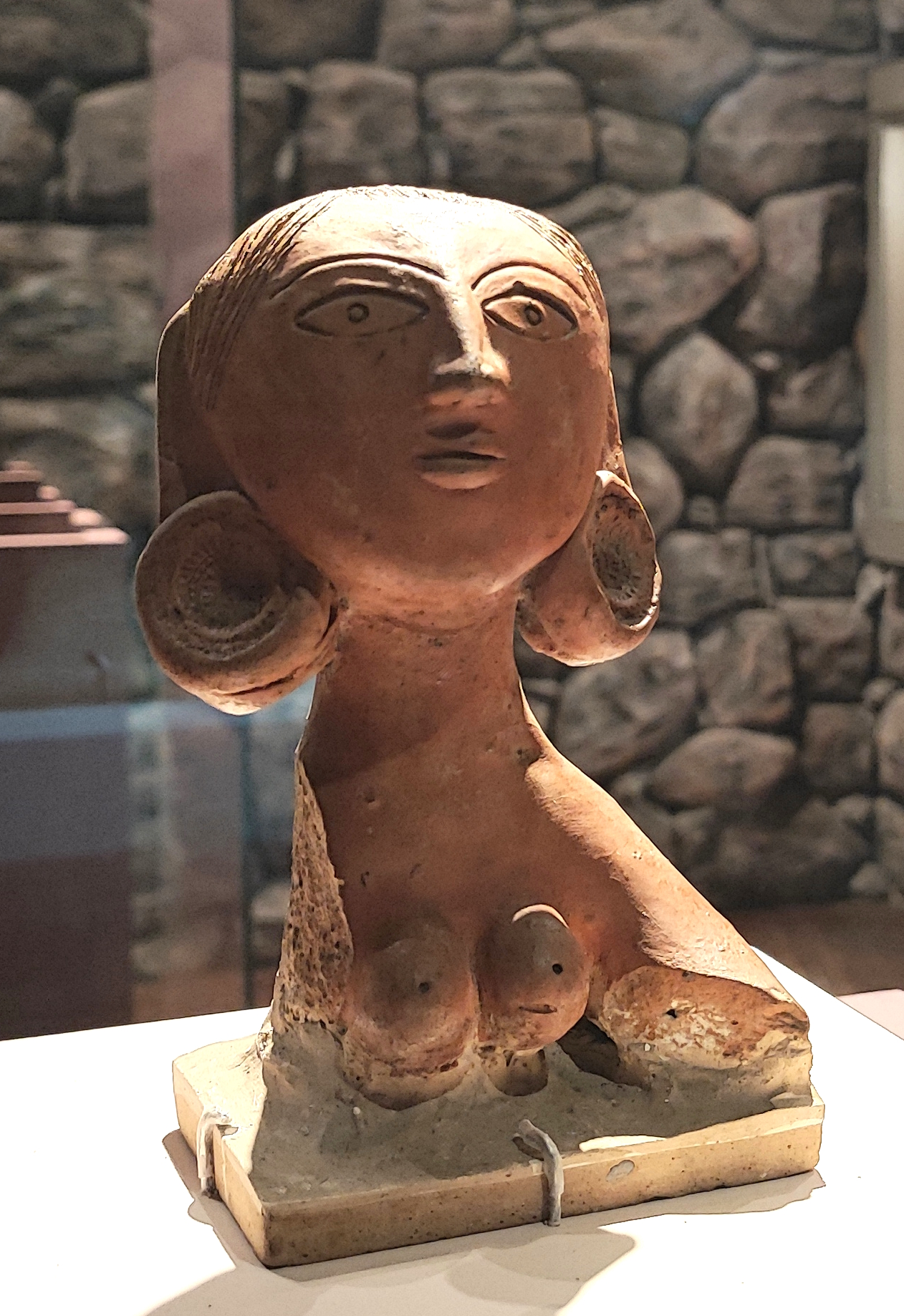
A Pre-Mauryan to early-Mauryan terracotta statuette from Buxar, ca. 4th century BCE (Bihar Museum, Arch. 6650).

According to local traditions, the name Buxar is derived from a lake in the town named Aghsar (effacer of Sin), which in course of time became Baghsar and took the present form that is Buxar. Another vedic legend states that, a sage or rishi named Besira transformed himself to take the look of a Tiger to frighten Durvasa rishi, and doomed by him to retain the form of Tiger forever. In order to restore his Human's form, Bedsira bathed in the holy pond of Aghsar and worshipped Gaurishankar. To commemorate this event the spot was called Vyaghrasar and later became Baghsar (The Tiger's pond).

Several ancient statuettes of the pre-Mauryan or early-Mauryan period (circa 4th century BCE) have been found in Buxar. Many of them are now located in the Bihar Museum. The style of these terracotta statuettes is generally similar to that of other Mauryan statuettes, but they are usually seated, being supported by tripod-like legs, have prominent breasts and out-stretched arms. Their headgear is often very elaborate, especially for later specimens.

== Demography ==
Historical populations
Year	Pop.	±%
1911	11,309	—
1921	10,098	−10.7%
1931	13,449	+33.2%
1941	14,879	+10.6%
1951	18,087	+21.6%
1961	23,068	+27.5%
1971	31,691	+37.4%
1981	42,952	+35.5%
1991	55,753	+29.8%
2001	83,168	+49.2%
2011	102,861	+23.7%
"District Census Handbook Part A - Buxar" (PDF). Census of India. p. 731.

As of 2011 India census, Buxar had a population of 102,861. Males constitute 52.65% of the population and females 47.35%. 16% of the population is under 6 years of age.

The 2011 census recorded the city of Buxar as having a literacy rate of 83.82%, with an 11.24% gap between male literacy (89.13%) and female literacy (77.89%). The whole of Buxar district had a literacy rate of 70.14%, with Buxar block (comprising both rural and urban areas) had a literacy rate of 77.45%, the highest in the district.

== Economy ==
Buxar is an important regional commercial and trade hub, with connections via road and rail along with river transport on the Ganges. Along with Dumraon, Buxar is one of the main centres for trade and industry in the district. Soap and furniture are manufactured in both cities. Major exports from Buxar include rice, paddy, gur, mango, vegetables, fish, and jail-related manufactured goods. Major imports include engineering goods and medicine.

== Villages ==
In addition to the urban settlements of Buxar and Sarimpur, Buxar block encompasses 132 villages. Of these, 97 are inhabited and 35 are uninhabited:

Village name	Total land area (hectares)	Population (in 2011)
Indour	157.8	1892
Kukurha	863.6	2,978
Karhansi	764	4,248
Gohuwana	24.7	0
Milki	89.8	0
Lalsagar	17	0
Mathia	48.1	756
Ijrisiram	215.7	2,312
Pirtampur	88.2	0
Ijribudhan	81.7	379
Karhansi	237	2,159
Rakasi Chak	279.3	2,259
Kudratipur	45.5	642
Jarigawan	115.7	1,408
Larai	46.6	445
Dubauli	36.8	0
Korarwa	34.4	478
Haripur	101.7	1,490
Govindapur	26.7	1,430
Umarpur	52.7	15
Misraulia	104	1,783
Kamhariya	80.6	907
Kamarpur	253.8	3,074
Laropur	13.3	0
Kiratpura	64.7	865
Lachhmipur	58.8	3,341
Baluwa	80.2	2,275
Belahi	39.6	864
Jagdishpur	28	0
Puliya	98.4	822
Chhotka Nuawan	127.4	2,034
Dubauli	46.6	242
Gopnuawan	81.4	624
Barka Nuawan	122.6	1,511
Parmanandpur	27.1	0
Thora	66.8	1,339
Thoragangbarar	22.3	0
Bibiganj	68.4	1,370
Panrepatti	521.6	10,745
Misraulia	183.7	2,901
Mathia Gurdas	48.8	747
Lalganj	123.9	2,083
Betwa	82	0
Manauwar Chak	41.3	595
Jaso	227.1	4,817
Sohani Patti	75.3	3,770
Niranjanpur	19	2,406
Ahirauli	312.4	6,496
Katkaulia	20.6	310
Nadaon	468.6	5,858
Sondhila	259.8	2,432
Panditpur	88.5	1,049
Jagdishpur	285.7	5,142
Kulhariya	377.6	3,242
Karhansi	270	2,833
Parasiya	82.2	1,050
Patelawa	40	350
Shiupur	39.7	0
Suratpur	48	0
Harkishunpur	35.6	1,383
Dalsagar	138	4,545
Gogaura	80.9	1,594
Tarapur	15.8	121
Sahupara	31.6	1,291
Parari	149.4	1,372
Churamanpur	245	4,277
Darappur	73	948
Arjunpur	197	4,599
Sherpur	72	998
Balapur	67.2	642
Dungurpur	18.7	0
Tiwaripur	22.7	865
Dubauli	21.1	29
Ekauna	56.1	2959
Gharaipur	28.7	0
Dahiwar	106.9	2,145
Garani	52.7	813
Majharia	495	2,302
Simra	17	69
Khutaha	146.4	4,188
Dudhar Chak	20.6	196
Kharanti	49.8	316
Ramubariya	64.7	1,032
Shankarpur	17.8	0
Paharpur	24.8	65
Bishunpura	24.3	0
Usrauliya	37	0
Balua	30	0
Panrepur	29.8	1,163
Upadhyapur	21.1	905
Kamkarahi	8.8	0
Jagdara	49	1,195
Gobindpur	32	0
Ganauli	66	0
Parari	52.8	714
Nat	39.8	1,615
Umarpur Diara	153.4	1,513
Mungraul	26.6	225
Padumpur	49.4	18
Misrauliya	62	2,876
Rampur	21	169
Bhosrampur	20.6	0
Sonbarsa	123.8	3,069
Desarbuzurg	73	440
Ammadarhi	45.3	861
Kharka	96	70
Marwa	62	337
Jatmahi	13	0
Narayanpur	25.9	0
Dumariya	9.9	0
Kothia	237.6	1,577
Balua	38	0
Belaur	118.6	1,637
Marautiya	101.2	0
Khadra	122.2	0
Baruna	779.8	6,694
Basauli	892	3,902
Boksa	639.8	5,580
Mahdah	1,443.1	9,344
Lachhmanpur	35.6	224
Bhabhuar Milki	23.1	0
Bhabhuar	110.8	1,007
Nuaon	71.6	953
Ramdiha	83.7	617
Nidhua	199	1,411
Pipra	42.4	0
Panditpur	59.1	285
Rahua	29.7	0
Sagrampur	60.2	788
Karauniyan	66	48
Babhani	108	1,383
Majhani Naubarar (Unsurveyed)	369	0
Umarpur Naubarar (Unsurveyed)	70	0
Umarpur Diara (Unsurveyed)	0	0
UmarpurJot MisranBarkaGaon	95.4	0

The total population of these villages is 180,308, in 27,985 households.

== Notable people ==
- Harihar Singh, Former Chief Minister of Bihar and Bhojpuri Poet.
- Bismillah Khan
- Kailashpati Mishra
- Sanjay Kumar Tiwari, Member of Legislative Assembly
- Shivnath Singh, Olympic athlete
- Ramanand Tiwary, Former Home Minister Of Bihar
- Prashant Kishor, Indian political strategist and tactician
- Nagendra Nath Ojha, Former Member of Rajya Sabha, CPI
- Manorama Pandey, Former Member of Rajya Sabha, Indian National Congress

== See also ==
- Buxar district
- List of cities in Bihar
- George William Ziemann's missionary work in Buxar
