= Uttar Pradesh Council of Ministers =

Indian executive branch of state government

- 18th Ministry of Uttar Pradesh
- Date formed: 25 March 2022

People and organisations
- Governor: Anandiben Patel
- Chief Minister: Yogi Adityanath
- Deputy Chief Ministers: Keshav Prasad Maurya; Brajesh Pathak
- No. of ministers: 60 (Including Chief Minister)
- Total no. of members: 60
- Member parties: NDA: BJP; AD(S); NP; RLD; SBSP
- Status in legislature: Uttar Pradesh Legislature 291 / 403 (72%) Legislative Assembly 290 / 403 (72%) Legislative Council 83 / 100 (83%)
- Opposition leader: Lal Bihari Yadav (Council); Mata Prasad Pandey (Assembly)

History
- Election: 2022
- Legislature terms: 4 years, 76 days
- Predecessor: First Yogi Adityanath ministry

The Uttar Pradesh Council of Ministers is the Government of Uttar Pradesh in 18th Uttar Pradesh Legislative Assembly headed by Chief Minister Yogi Adityanath since 25 March 2022. As per the Constitution of India, the Uttar Pradesh Council of Ministers, including the Chief Minister, can have maximum 60 members.

Currently there are 53 Ministers. Along with the Chief Minister, 19 are Cabinet ministers, 14 are State ministers with Independent charge and 20 are State ministers. Out of the 53 ministers, 51 belongs to the BJP while NISHAD Party , AD(S), Suheldev Bharatiya Samaj Party and Rashtriya Lok Dal have 1 minister each.

== Oath as the state chief minister/minister ==
I, <Name of Chief Minister/Minister>, do swear in the name of God/solemnly affirm that I will bear true faith and allegiance to the Constitution of India as by law established, that I will uphold the sovereignty and integrity of India, that I will faithfully and conscientiously discharge my duties as a Minister for the State of () and that I will do right to all manner of people in accordance with the Constitution and the law without fear or favour, affection or ill-will.

== Current Council of Ministers ==
=== Cabinet Ministers ===
Portfolio	Minister	Took office	Left office	Party
Chief Minister; Home Affairs; Appointment & Personnel; General Administration; Cabinet Affairs; Information & Public Relations; Housing; Revenue; Mining & Geology; Institutional Finance; Planning; Programme Implementation; Relief & Rehabilitation; Protocol; Sainik Welfare; Prantiya Raksha Dal; Civil Aviation; Law; Food Security & Drug Administration; Other departments not allotted to any minister	Yogi Adityanath	25 March 2022	Incumbent	BJP
Deputy Chief Minister; Minister of Rural Development; Minister of Food Processing; Minister of Entertainment Tax	Keshav Prasad Maurya	25 March 2022	Incumbent	BJP
Deputy Chief Minister; Minister of Health & Family Welfare; Minister of Medical Education; Minister of Maternity & Child Welfare	Brajesh Pathak	25 March 2022	Incumbent	BJP
Minister of Finance; Minister of Parliamentary Affairs	Suresh Kumar Khanna	25 March 2022	Incumbent	BJP
Minister of Agriculture; Minister of Agricultural Education & Research	Surya Pratap Shahi	25 March 2022	Incumbent	BJP
Minister of Jal Shakti; Minister of Disaster Management	Swatantra Dev Singh	25 March 2022	Incumbent	BJP
Minister of Women Development; Minister of Child Development & Nutrition	Baby Rani Maurya	25 March 2022	Incumbent	BJP
Minister of Sugarcane Development & Sugar Mills	Laxmi Narayan Chaudhary	25 March 2022	Incumbent	BJP
Minister of Tourism; Minister of Culture	] Jaiveer Singh	25 March 2022	Incumbent	BJP
Minister of Animal Husbandry & Dairying; Minister of Political Pension	Dharmpal Singh	25 March 2022	Incumbent	BJP
Minister of Minority Welfare; Minister of Haj & Wakf	Dharmpal Singh	25 March 2022	5 March 2024	BJP
Minister of Minority Welfare; Minister of Haj & Wakf	Om Prakash Rajbhar	5 March 2024	Incumbent	SBSP
Minister of Industrial Development; Minister of Export Promotion; Minister of NRI & Investment Promotion	Nand Gopal Gupta	25 March 2022	Incumbent	BJP
Minister of Panchayati Raj	Bhupendra Chaudhary	25 March 2022	30 August 2022	BJP
Minister of Panchayati Raj	Yogi Adityanath (Chief Minister)	30 August 2022	5 March 2024	BJP
Minister of Panchayati Raj	Om Prakash Rajbhar	5 March 2024	Incumbent	SBSP
Minister of Labour & Employment	Anil Rajbhar	25 March 2022	Incumbent	BJP
Minister of Public Works Department	Jitin Prasada	25 March 2022	11 June 2024	BJP
Minister of MSME; Minister of Khadi & Village Industries; Minister of Sericulture Industries; Minister of Textiles & Handlooms	Rakesh Sachan	25 March 2022	Incumbent	BJP
Minister of Urban Development; Minister of Urban Employment & Poverty Alleviation; Minister of Energy & Additional sources of Energy	A. K. Sharma	25 March 2022	Incumbent	BJP
Minister of Higher Education	Yogendra Upadhyaya	25 March 2022	Incumbent	BJP
Minister of Electronics & Information Technology	Yogendra Upadhyaya	25 March 2022	5 March 2024	BJP
Minister of Electronics & Information Technology	Sunil Sharma	5 March 2024	Incumbent	BJP
Minister of Science & Technology	Yogendra Upadhyaya	25 March 2022	5 March 2024	BJP
Minister of Science & Technology	Anil Kumar	5 March 2024	Incumbent	RLD
Minister of Technical Education; Minister of Consumer Protection	Ashish Patel	25 March 2022	Incumbent	AD(S)
Minister of Fisheries	Sanjay Nishad	25 March 2022	Incumbent	NISHAD
Minister of Prisons	Dharmveer Prajapati (Independent Charge)	25 March 2022	5 March 2024	BJP
Minister of Prisons	Dara Singh Chauhan	5 March 2024	Incumbent	BJP

=== Ministers of State (Independent Charge) ===
Portfolio	Minister	Took office	Left office	Party
Minister of Excise & Liquor Prohibition	Nitin Agrawal	25 March 2022	Incumbent	BJP
Minister of Vocational Education & Skill Development	Kapil Dev Agarwal	25 March 2022	Incumbent	BJP
Minister of Stamp, Court Fees & Registration	Ravindra Jaiswal	25 March 2022	Incumbent	BJP
Minister of Basic Education	Sandeep Singh	25 March 2022	Incumbent	BJP
Minister of Secondary Education	Gulabo Devi	25 March 2022	Incumbent	BJP
Minister of Sports & Youth Affairs	Girish Yadav	25 March 2022	Incumbent	BJP
Minister of Civil Defence & Home Guards	Dharmveer Prajapati	25 March 2022	Incumbent	BJP
Minister of Social Welfare; Minister of SC/ST Welfare	Asim Arun	25 March 2022	Incumbent	BJP
Minister of Co-operation	Jayendra Pratap Singh Rathore	25 March 2022	Incumbent	BJP
Minister of Transport	Daya Shankar Singh	25 March 2022	Incumbent	BJP
Minister of Backward Classes Welfare; Minister of Disabled Empowerment	Narendra Kumar Kashyap	25 March 2022	Incumbent	BJP
Minister of Horticulture; Minister of Agricultural Exports, Marketing & Foreign Trade	Dinesh Pratap Singh	25 March 2022	Incumbent	BJP
Minister of Environment & Forest; Minister of Zoological Garden & Climate Change	Arun Saxena	25 March 2022	Incumbent	BJP
Minister of AYUSH; Minister of state in Food Security & Drug Administration	Daya Shankar Mishra	25 March 2022	Incumbent	BJP

=== Minister of State ===
Portfolio	Minister	Took office	Left office	Party
Minister of Parliamentary Affairs; Minister of Medical Education; Minister of Health & Family Welfare; Minister of Maternity & Child Welfare	Mayankeshwar Singh	25 March 2022	Incumbent	BJP
Minister of Jal Shakti	Dinesh Khatik	25 March 2022	Incumbent	BJP
Minister of Social Welfare; Minister of SC/ST Welfare	Sanjiv Gond	25 March 2022	Incumbent	BJP
Minister of Agriculture; Minister of Agricultural Education & Research	Baldev Singh Aulakh	25 March 2022	Incumbent	BJP
Minister of Science & Technology; Minister of Electronics & Information Technology	Ajit Singh Pal	25 March 2022	Incumbent	BJP
Minister of Parliamentary Affairs; Minister of Industrial Development	Jaswant Saini	25 March 2022	Incumbent	BJP
Minister of Jal Shakti	Ramakesh Nishad	25 March 2022	Incumbent	BJP
Minister of Labour & Employment	Manohar Lal Panth	25 March 2022	Incumbent	BJP
Minister of Sugarcane Development & Sugar Mills	Sanjay Singh Gangwar	25 March 2022	Incumbent	BJP
Minister of Public Works Department	Brijesh Singh	25 March 2022	Incumbent	BJP
Minister of Environment & Forest; Minister of Zoological Garden & Climate Change	Krishnapal Malik	25 March 2022	Incumbent	BJP
Minister of Prisons	Suresh Rahi	25 March 2022	Incumbent	BJP
Minister of Revenue	Anoop Pradhan Valmiki	25 March 2022	11 June 2024	BJP
Minister of Women & Child Development	Pratibha Shukla	25 March 2022	Incumbent	BJP
Minister of Urban Development; Minister of Urban Employment & Poverty Alleviation	Rakesh Rathour	25 March 2022	Incumbent	BJP
Minister of Energy & Additional sources of Energy	Somendra Tomar	25 March 2022	Incumbent	BJP
Minister of Higher Education	Rajani Tiwari	25 March 2022	Incumbent	BJP
Minister of Food & Civil Supplies	Satish Chandra Sharma	25 March 2022	Incumbent	BJP
Minister of Minority Affairs; Minister of Haj & Wakf	Danish Azad Ansari	25 March 2022	Incumbent	BJP
Minister of Rural Development	Vijay Laxmi Gautam	25 March 2022	Incumbent	BJP
