= Second Yogi Adityanath ministry =

Government of Uttar Pradesh, India since 2022

- 18th Ministry of Uttar Pradesh
- Date formed: 25 March 2022

People and organisations
- Governor: Anandiben Patel
- Chief Minister: Yogi Adityanath
- Deputy Chief Ministers: Keshav Prasad Maurya; Brajesh Pathak
- No. of ministers: 60 (Including Chief Minister)
- Total no. of members: 60
- Member parties: NDA: BJP; AD(S); NP; RLD; SBSP
- Status in legislature: Majority
- Opposition leader: Lal Bihari Yadav (Council); Mata Prasad Pandey (Assembly)

History
- Election: 2022
- Legislature terms: 4 years, 216 days
- Predecessor: First Yogi ministry

The Second Yogi Adityanath ministry is the council of ministers in headed by Chief Minister Yogi Adityanath, which was formed after 2022 Uttar Pradesh Legislative Assembly election which was held in seven phases during February and March in the state. The results were declared on 10 March and this led to formation of 18th Uttar Pradesh Legislative Assembly. The swearing-in ceremony was held at BRSABV Ekana International Cricket stadium, Gomti Nagar Extension in Lucknow. The heads of all the big Indian and NDA lead states along with the big businessmen including many celebrities were invited in the ceremony. The Governor administered the oath of office to 53 ministers (Chief Minister, 2 Deputy Chief Ministers, 16 Cabinet Ministers, 14 MoS Ind Charge and 20 MoS).
On 5th March 2024, first expansion took place with oath of office to 4 ministers (2 from BJP, 1 each from SBSP and RLD)
On 10th May 2026, second expansion took place with oath of office to 8 ministers (2 cabinet ministers, 4 MoS and 2 MoS promoted to MoS Ind Charge)

== Council of Ministers ==
=== Cabinet Ministers ===
Portfolio	Minister	Took office	Left office	Party
Chief Minister; Home Affairs; Appointment & Personnel; General Administration; Cabinet Affairs; Information & Public Relations; Housing; Revenue; Mining & Geology; Institutional Finance; Planning; Programme Implementation; Relief & Rehabilitation; Protocol; Sainik Welfare; Prantiya Raksha Dal; Civil Aviation; Law; Food Security & Drug Administration; Other departments not allotted to any minister	Yogi Adityanath	25 March 2022	Incumbent	BJP
Deputy Chief Minister; Minister of Rural Development; Minister of Food Processing; Minister of Entertainment Tax	Keshav Prasad Maurya	25 March 2022	Incumbent	BJP
Deputy Chief Minister; Minister of Health & Family Welfare; Minister of Medical Education; Minister of Maternity & Child Welfare	Brajesh Pathak	25 March 2022	Incumbent	BJP
Minister of Finance; Minister of Parliamentary Affairs	Suresh Kumar Khanna	25 March 2022	Incumbent	BJP
Minister of Agriculture; Minister of Agricultural Education & Research	Surya Pratap Shahi	25 March 2022	Incumbent	BJP
Minister of Jal Shakti; Minister of Disaster Management	Swatantra Dev Singh	25 March 2022	Incumbent	BJP
Minister of Women Development; Minister of Child Development & Nutrition	Baby Rani Maurya	25 March 2022	Incumbent	BJP
Minister of Sugarcane Development & Sugar Mills	Laxmi Narayan Chaudhary	25 March 2022	Incumbent	BJP
Minister of Tourism; Minister of Culture	Jaiveer Singh	25 March 2022	Incumbent	BJP
Minister of Animal Husbandry & Dairying; Minister of Political Pension	Dharmpal Singh	25 March 2022	Incumbent	BJP
Minister of Minority Welfare; Minister of Haj & Wakf	Dharmpal Singh	25 March 2022	5 March 2024	BJP
Minister of Minority Welfare; Minister of Haj & Wakf	Om Prakash Rajbhar	5 March 2024	Incumbent	SBSP
Minister of Industrial Development; Minister of Export Promotion; Minister of NRI & Investment Promotion	Nand Gopal Gupta	25 March 2022	Incumbent	BJP
Minister of Panchayati Raj	Bhupendra Chaudhary	25 March 2022	30 August 2022	BJP
Minister of Panchayati Raj	Yogi Adityanath (Chief Minister)	30 August 2022	5 March 2024	BJP
Minister of Panchayati Raj	Om Prakash Rajbhar	5 March 2024	Incumbent	SBSP
Minister of Labour & Employment	Anil Rajbhar	25 March 2022	Incumbent	BJP
Minister of Public Works Department	Jitin Prasada	25 March 2022	11 June 2024	BJP
Minister of Minister of Khadi & Village Industries; Minister of Sericulture Industries; Minister of Textiles & Handlooms	Rakesh Sachan	25 March 2022	Incumbent	BJP
Minister of Urban Development; Minister of Urban Employment & Poverty Alleviation; Minister of Energy & Additional sources of Energy	A. K. Sharma	25 March 2022	Incumbent	BJP
Minister of Higher Education	Yogendra Upadhyaya	25 March 2022	Incumbent	BJP
Minister of Electronics & Information Technology	Yogendra Upadhyaya	25 March 2022	5 March 2024	BJP
Minister of Electronics & Information Technology	Sunil Sharma	5 March 2024	Incumbent	BJP
Minister of Science & Technology	Yogendra Upadhyaya	25 March 2022	5 March 2024	BJP
Minister of Science & Technology	Anil Kumar	5 March 2024	Incumbent	RLD
Minister of Technical Education; Minister of Consumer Protection	Ashish Patel	25 March 2022	Incumbent	AD(S)
Minister of Fisheries	Sanjay Nishad	25 March 2022	Incumbent	NISHAD
Minister of Prisons	Dharmveer Prajapati (Independent Charge)	25 March 2022	5 March 2024	BJP
Minister of Prisons	Dara Singh Chauhan	5 March 2024	Incumbent	BJP
Minister of Micro Small and Medium Enterprises	Bhupendra Chaudhary	10 May 2026	Incumbent	BJP
Minister of Food and Logistics, Civil Supplies	Manoj Kumar Pandey	10 May 2022	Incumbent	Independent

=== Ministers of State (Independent Charge) ===
Portfolio	Minister	Took office	Left office	Party
Minister of Excise & Liquor Prohibition	Nitin Agrawal	25 March 2022	Incumbent	BJP
Minister of Vocational Education & Skill Development	Kapil Dev Agarwal	25 March 2022	Incumbent	BJP
Minister of Stamp, Court Fees & Registration	Ravindra Jaiswal	25 March 2022	Incumbent	BJP
Minister of Basic Education	Sandeep Singh	25 March 2022	Incumbent	BJP
Minister of Secondary Education	Gulabo Devi	25 March 2022	Incumbent	BJP
Minister of Sports & Youth Affairs	Girish Yadav	25 March 2022	Incumbent	BJP
Minister of Civil Defence & Home Guards	Dharmveer Prajapati	25 March 2022	Incumbent	BJP
Minister of Social Welfare; Minister of SC/ST Welfare	Asim Arun	25 March 2022	Incumbent	BJP
Minister of Co-operation	Jayendra Pratap Singh Rathore	25 March 2022	Incumbent	BJP
Minister of Transport	Daya Shankar Singh	25 March 2022	Incumbent	BJP
Minister of Backward Classes Welfare; Minister of Disabled Empowerment	Narendra Kumar Kashyap	25 March 2022	Incumbent	BJP
Minister of Horticulture; Minister of Agricultural Exports, Marketing & Foreign Trade	Dinesh Pratap Singh	25 March 2022	Incumbent	BJP
Minister of Environment & Forest; Minister of Zoological Garden & Climate Change	Arun Saxena	25 March 2022	Incumbent	BJP
Minister of AYUSH; Minister of state in Food Security & Drug Administration	Daya Shankar Mishra	25 March 2022	Incumbent	BJP
Minister of Food Security and Drug Administration	Ajit Singh Pal	10 May 2026	Incumbent	BJP
Minister of Political Pension, Sainik Welfare and P.R.D.	Somendra Tomar	10 May 2026	Incumbent	BJP

=== Minister of State ===
Portfolio	Minister	Took office	Left office	Party
Minister of Parliamentary Affairs; Minister of Medical Education; Minister of Health & Family Welfare; Minister of Maternity & Child Welfare	Mayankeshwar Singh	25 March 2022	Incumbent	BJP
Minister of Jal Shakti	Dinesh Khatik	25 March 2022	Incumbent	BJP
Minister of Social Welfare; Minister of SC/ST Welfare	Sanjiv Gond	25 March 2022	Incumbent	BJP
Minister of Agriculture; Minister of Agricultural Education & Research	Baldev Singh Aulakh	25 March 2022	Incumbent	BJP
Minister of Parliamentary Affairs; Minister of Industrial Development	Jaswant Saini	25 March 2022	Incumbent	BJP
Minister of Jal Shakti	Ramakesh Nishad	25 March 2022	Incumbent	BJP
Minister of Labour & Employment	Manohar Lal Panth	25 March 2022	Incumbent	BJP
Minister of Sugarcane Development & Sugar Mills	Sanjay Singh Gangwar	25 March 2022	Incumbent	BJP
Minister of Public Works Department	Brijesh Singh	25 March 2022	Incumbent	BJP
Minister of Environment & Forest; Minister of Zoological Garden & Climate Change	Krishnapal Malik	25 March 2022	Incumbent	BJP
Minister of Prisons	Suresh Rahi	25 March 2022	Incumbent	BJP
Minister of Revenue	Anoop Pradhan Valmiki	25 March 2022	11 June 2024	BJP
Minister of Women & Child Development	Pratibha Shukla	25 March 2022	Incumbent	BJP
Minister of Urban Development; Minister of Urban Employment & Poverty Alleviation	Rakesh Rathour	25 March 2022	Incumbent	BJP
Minister of Higher Education	Rajani Tiwari	25 March 2022	Incumbent	BJP
Minister of Food & Civil Supplies	Satish Chandra Sharma	25 March 2022	Incumbent	BJP
Minister of Minority Affairs; Minister of Haj & Wakf	Danish Azad Ansari	25 March 2022	Incumbent	BJP
Minister of Rural Development	Vijay Laxmi Gautam	25 March 2022	Incumbent	BJP
Minister of Animal Husbandry and Dairy Development	Krishna Paswan	10 May 2026	Incumbent	BJP
Minister of Energy, Additional Sources of Energy	Kailash Singh Rajput	10 May 2026	Incumbent	BJP
Minister of Revenue	Surender Diler	10 May 2026	Incumbent	BJP
Minister of Micro, Small & Medium Enterprises	Hans Raj Vishwakarma	10 May 2026	Incumbent	BJP
Minister of Science & Technology; Minister of Electronics & Information Technology	Ajit Singh Pal	25 March 2022	Made Mos (I/C)	BJP
Minister of Energy & Additional sources of Energy	Somendra Tomar	25 March 2022	Made Mos (I/C)	BJP

== Outgoing Ministers ==
Sitting ministers Mukut Bihari, Swati Singh, Chaudhary Udaybhan Singh were denied tickets for contesting election.

=== Sitting Ministers who lost ===
1. Suresh Rana
2. Rajendra Pratap Singh
3. Upendra Tiwari
4. Satish Chandra Dwivedi
5. Anand Swaroop Shukla
6. Ranvendra Pratap Singh
7. Lakhan Singh
8. Chandrika Prasad Upadhyay
9. Chhatrapal Singh Gangwar
10. Sangeeta Balwant
11. Keshav Prasad Maurya

These are the Ministers which were the part of First Yogi Adityanath Ministry but were not included in Second Yogi Adityanath Ministry.

1. Dinesh Sharma
2. Satish Mahana
3. Ramapati Shastri
4. Jai Pratap Singh
5. Shrikant Sharma
6. Sidharth Nath Singh
7. Ashutosh Tandon
8. Mahendra Kumar Singh
9. Ram Naresh Agnihotri
10. Neelkanth Tiwari
11. Ashok Katariya
12. Sriram Chauhan
13. Jai Prakash Nishad
14. Jai Kumar Singh Jaiki
15. Atul Garg
16. Mohsin Raza
17. Suresh Pasi
18. Anil Sharma
19. Mahesh Chandra Gupta
20. Girraj Singh Dharmesh
21. Neelima Katiyar
22. Rama Shankar Singh
23. Paltu Ram

Satish Mahana was later elected as the speaker of the legislative assembly.

== Demographics of the Council of Ministers ==
Representation of Cabinet Ministers by Party
1. Bharatiya Janata Party (92.9%)
2. Apna Dal (Sonelal) (1.78%)
3. NISHAD Party (1.78%)
4. Rashtriya Lok Dal (1.78%)
5. Suheldev Bharatiya Samaj Party (1.78%)

The following table represent the demographics of council of ministers as per 10 April 2022.

=== NDA Cabinet by Party ===
Party	Cabinet Ministers	Ministers of State (I/C)	Ministers of State	Total Number of Ministers
Bharatiya Janata Party	19	16	21	56
Apna Dal (Sonelal)	1	0	0	1
Rashtriya Lok Dal	1	0	0	1
NISHAD Party	1	0	0	1
Suheldev Bharatiya Samaj Party	1	0	0	1
Total	23	16	21	60

== District Wise Distribution ==
District	Number of Ministers
Saharanpur	2
Muzaffarnagar	2
Moradabad	1
Sambhal	1
Rampur	1
Meerut	2
Bagpat	1
Ghaziabad	2
Aligarh	2
Hathras	1
Mathura	1
Agra	2
Mainpuri	1
Bareilly	2
Pilibhit	1
Shahjahanpur	2
Sitapur	2
Hardoi	2
Lucknow	1
Raebareli	2
Amethi	1
Kannauj	2
Kanpur Dehat	3
Jalaun	1
Lalitpur	1
Banda	1
Chitrakoot	1
Kaushambi	1
Prayagraj	1
Barabanki	1
Gorakhpur	2
Deoria	2
Mau	2
Ballia	2
Jaunpur	1
Varanasi	4
Sonbhadra	1
Fatehpur	1
Ghazipur	1
