= Department of Parliamentary Affairs (Uttar Pradesh) =

- संसदीय कार्य विभाग

Agency overview
- Jurisdiction: State of Uttar Pradesh
- Headquarters: Department of Parliamentary Affairs, Lal Bahadur Shastri Bhawan (Annexe Building), Sarojini Naidu Marg, Lucknow, Uttar Pradesh
- Ministers responsible: Suresh Kumar Khanna, Cabinet Minister of Parliamentary Affairs; Mayankeshwar Sharan Singh, Minister of State of Parliamentary Affairs
- Agency executives: Jai Prakash Singh, Principal Secretary; Kaushlendra Yadav, Special Secretary
- Website: Department of Parliamentary Affairs

The Department of Parliamentary Affairs is an Uttar Pradesh government department. It is headed by state Cabinet Minister of Parliamentary Affairs.

It has the role of handling affairs related to the legislature of the state and works as a link between both the houses of the legislature, the Vidhan Sabha (Legislative Assembly) and the Vidhan Parishad (Legislative Council).

Currently, Suresh Kumar Khanna, MLA from the Shahjahanpur constituency is serving as the Cabinet Minister of Parliamentary Affairs since March 2017. Mayankeshwar Sharan Singh is serving as the Minister of State for Parliamentary Affairs since March 2022.

Minister of Parliamentary Affairs मंत्री संसदीय कार्य विभाग
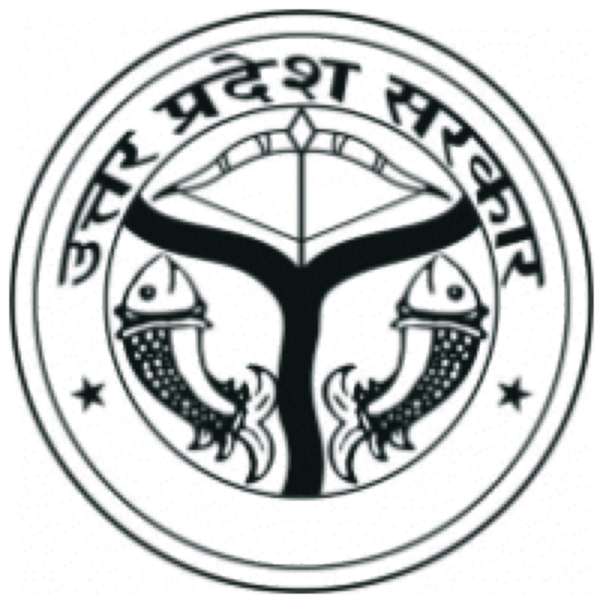
- Seal of Uttar Pradesh Government

- Flag of India
- Incumbent; Suresh Kumar Khanna since 22 March 2017
- Department of Parliamentary Affairs (Uttar Pradesh)
- Style: The Honourable
- Abbreviation: Cabinet Minister
- Member of: Uttar Pradesh Council of Ministers; Uttar Pradesh Legislature
- Reports to: The governor Uttar Pradesh Legislature
- Seat: Annexe Building, Lucknow
- Appointer: The governor on the advice of Chief Minister
- Term length: 5 Years (Until left office earlier)
- Precursor: Azam Khan; 2012 - 2017
- Deputy: Minister of State for Parliamentary Affairs

== List of Cabinet ministers ==
No	Image	Name	From	To	Duration	Chief Minister	Political Party
1.		Kalyan Singh	29 September 1997	14 January 1998	107 days	Kalyan Singh	Bharatiya Janata Party
2.		Hukum Singh	15 January 1998	12 November 1999	4 years, 52 days	Kalyan Singh	Bharatiya Janata Party
2.		Hukum Singh	20 November 1999	28 October 2000	4 years, 52 days	Ram Prakash Gupta	Bharatiya Janata Party
2.		Hukum Singh	28 October 2000	8 March 2002	4 years, 52 days	Rajnath Singh	Bharatiya Janata Party
3.		Sukhdev Rajbhar	3 May 2002	28 August 2003	1 year, 117 days	Mayawati	Bahujan Samaj Party
4.		Azam Khan	6 September 2003	13 May 2007	3 years, 249 days	Mulayam Singh Yadav	Samajwadi Party
5.		Lalji Verma	17 March 2007	7 March 2012	4 years, 356 days	Mayawati	Bahujan Samaj Party
(4).		Azam Khan	18 March 2012	17 March 2017	4 years, 364 days	Akhilesh Yadav	Samajwadi Party
6.		Suresh Kumar Khanna	19 March 2017	25 March 2022	9 years, 172 days	Yogi Adityanath	Bharatiya Janata Party
6.		Suresh Kumar Khanna	25 March 2022	Incumbent	9 years, 172 days	Yogi Adityanath	Bharatiya Janata Party

== See also ==
- Uttar Pradesh Government
- Suresh Kumar Khanna
- Second Yogi Adityanath ministry
