= Mukut Bihari =

Indian politician (born 1945)

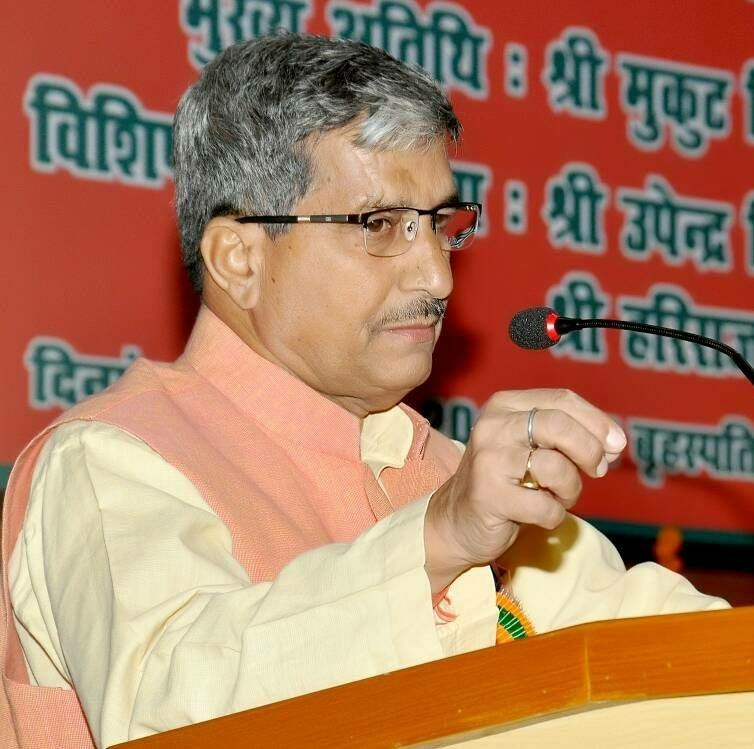

Minister of Co-operation Government of Uttar Pradesh
- In office 19 March 2017 – 25 March 2022
- Chief Minister: Yogi Adityanath
- Succeeded by: Jayendra Pratap Singh Rathore

Member of Uttar Pradesh Legislative Assembly
- In office 2012–2022
- Preceded by: Gulam Mohammad Khan
- Succeeded by: Anand Kumar
- Constituency: Kaiserganj
- In office 2002–2007
- Preceded by: Ram Tej Yadav
- Succeeded by: Gulam Mohammad Khan
- Constituency: Kaiserganj

Personal details
- Born: 28 December 1945 (age 79); Madaria, United Provinces, British India
- Political party: Bharatiya Janata Party
- Spouse: Savitri (m. 1962)
- Parent: Ramsukh Verma (father)
- Education: LLB

Mukut Bihari is an Indian politician and member of the Bharatiya Janata Party. Bihari is a member of the Uttar Pradesh Legislative Assembly from the Kaiserganj (Assembly constituency) in Bahraich district.
