= Jayendra Pratap Singh Rathore =

Indian politician

Minister of Co-operation Government of Uttar Pradesh
- Incumbent
- Assumed office 25 March 2022
- Chief Minister: Yogi Adityanath
- Preceded by: Mukut Bihari

Member of Uttar Pradesh Legislative Council
- Incumbent
- Assumed office 7 July 2022
- Chief Minister: Yogi Adityanath

State Vice President of Bharatiya Janata Party, Shahjahanpur
- In office 2000–2005

Personal details
- Born: Mohanpur Mamrejpur, Shahjahanpur, Uttar Pradesh, India
- Party: BJP
- Spouse: Priya Singh Rathore
- Children: 2 sons
- Parents: Balram Singh Rathore (father); Saroj Rathore (mother)
- Education: IIT BHU (B.Tech) (M.Tech)
- Occupation: Politician

Jayendra Pratap Singh Rathore is an Indian politician. He is a member of the Uttar Pradesh Legislative Council, represents Bharatiya Janata Party. He is a Minister of State (Independent Charge) Co-operation in Second Yogi Adityanath ministry.

He was also the incumbent State Vice President of Bharatiya Janata Party, Shahjahanpur from 2000 to 2005.

== Early life ==
After completing his education at the primary school in his native village, Rathore pursued his intermediate studies at Government Inter College. Following this, he attended BHU for higher education, where he obtained both his B.Tech. and M.Tech. degrees from IIT BHU.

== Political career ==
On 7 July 2022, the Chief Minister, Yogi Adityanath, appointed Jayendra Pratap Singh Rathore as the Minister of State (Independent Charge) for Co-operation in the Uttar Pradesh government, as a part of his Second Yogi Adityanath ministry.

== Personal life ==
Rathore was born in Mohanpur, Mamrejpur, to Balram Singh Rathore and Saroj Rathore. He was married to Priya Singh Rathore, and they have two sons.
