= List of deputy chief ministers of Uttar Pradesh =

Deputy Leader of the executive of the Government of Uttar Pradesh

Deputy Chief Minister of Uttar Pradesh
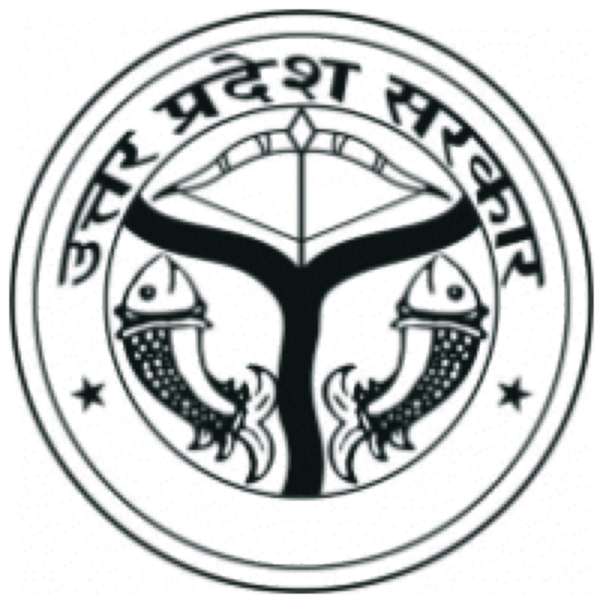
- Seal of Uttar Pradesh

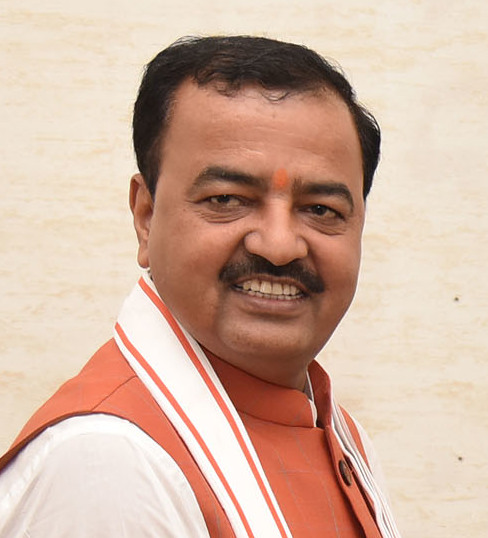
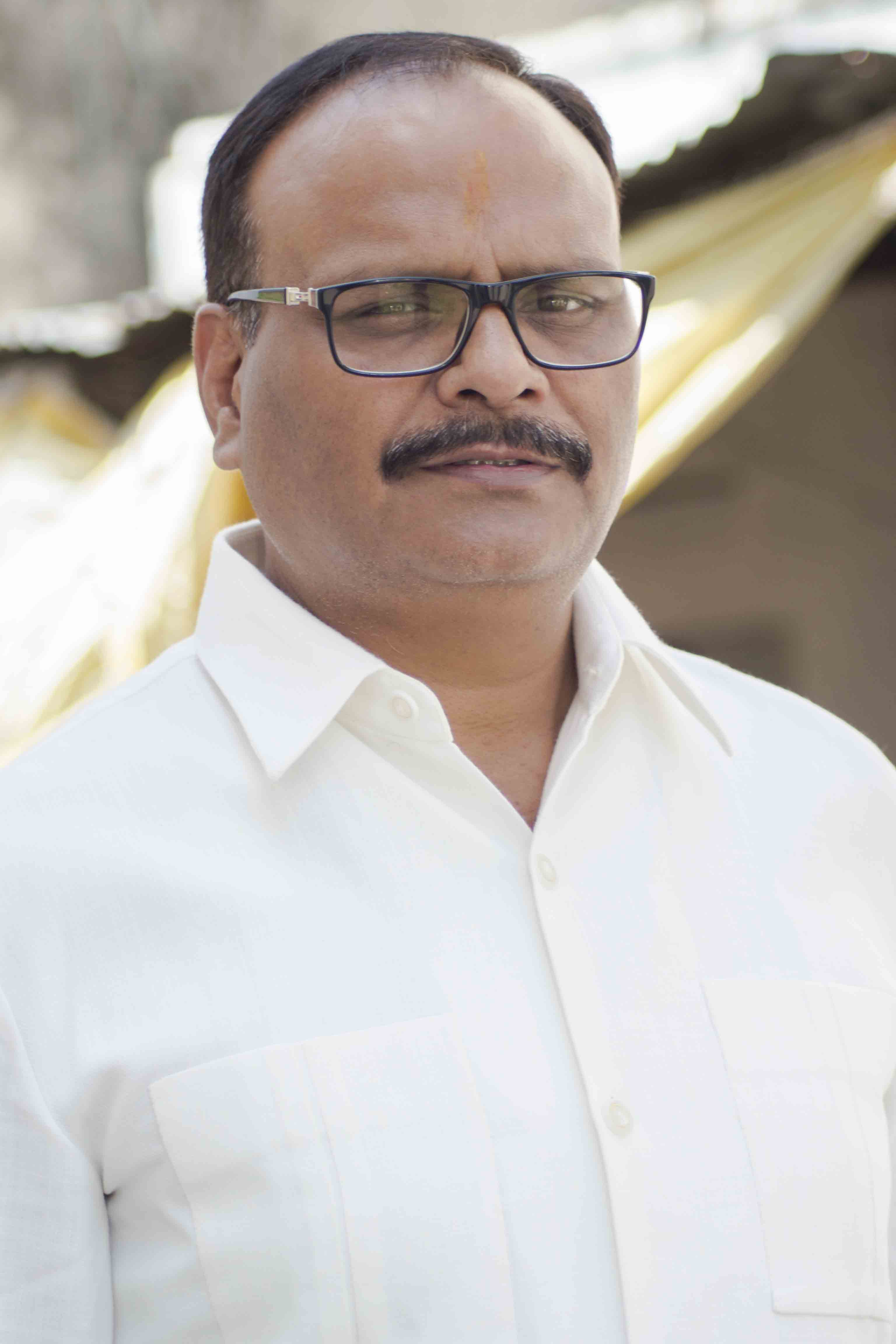
- Incumbent; Keshav Prasad Maurya (since 19 March 2017) and Brajesh Pathak (since 25 March 2022)
- Deputy Chief Ministers of Uttar Pradesh
- Style: The Honourable
- Status: Deputy Head of Government
- Abbreviation: DCM
- Member of: Uttar Pradesh Legislature; Uttar Pradesh Council of Ministers
- Seat: Lok Bhavan, Lucknow
- Nominator: Chief Minister of Uttar Pradesh
- Appointer: Governor of Uttar Pradesh
- Term length: At the confidence of the assembly; 5 years and is subject to no term limits.
- Inaugural holder: Narain Singh
- Formation: 26 January 1950 (76 years ago)

The deputy chief minister of Uttar Pradesh is a member of the Cabinet of Uttar Pradesh Government in the Government of Uttar Pradesh. Not a constitutional office, it seldom carries any specific powers. In the parliamentary system of government, the chief minister is treated as the "first among equals" in the cabinet; the position of deputy chief minister is used to bring political stability and strength within a coalition government. The post of deputy chief minister is a kind of informal post, which is not mentioned in the Constitution. It works like an ordinary cabinet minister. The appointment of deputy chief minister is done by the ruling party only to maintain balance in the political situation. There is no fixed number for the post of deputy chief minister, in any state it can be made two, three or even more. After the 2017 Uttar Pradesh assembly elections, two deputy chief ministers Dinesh Sharma and Keshav Prasad Maurya were appointed under Chief Minister Yogi Adityanath to correct the electoral equations. Babu Narain Singh Gurjar was first deputy chief minister of Uttar Pradesh. The position of deputy chief minister is not explicitly defined or mentioned in the Constitution of India. However, the Supreme Court of India has stated that the appointment of deputy chief ministers is not unconstitutional. The court has clarified that a deputy chief minister, for all practical purposes, remains a minister in the council of ministers headed by the chief minister and does not draw a higher salary or perks compared to other ministers.During the absence of the chief minister, the deputy-chief minister may chair cabinet meetings and lead the assembly majority. Various deputy chief ministers have also taken the oath of secrecy in line with the one that chief minister takes. This oath has also sparked controversies.

== List of deputy chief ministers ==
No	Portrait	Name	Constituency	Term of office			Assembly (Election)	Chief Minister	Party
1		Narain Singh	Morma	3 April 1967	25 February 1968	328 days	4th (1967 election)	Charan Singh	Independent
1		Ram Chandra Vikal	Sikandrabad	3 April 1967	25 February 1968	328 days	4th (1967 election)	Charan Singh	Independent
1		Ram Prakash Gupta	MLC	3 April 1967	25 February 1968	328 days	4th (1967 election)	Charan Singh	Bharatiya Jana Sangh
2		Kamalapati Tripathi		26 February 1969	17 February 1970	356 days	5th (1969 election)	Chandra Bhanu Gupta	Indian National Congress
3		Ram Naresh Yadav	Nidhauli Kalan	28 February 1979	17 February 1980	354 days	7th (1977 election)	Banarasi Das	Janata Party
5		Dinesh Sharma	MLC	19 March 2017	25 March 2022	5 years, 6 days	17th (2017 election)	Yogi Adityanath	Bharatiya Janata Party
4		Keshav Prasad Maurya	MLC	19 March 2017	Incumbent	9 years, 191 days	17th (2017 election)	Yogi Adityanath	Bharatiya Janata Party
4		Keshav Prasad Maurya	MLC	19 March 2017	Incumbent	9 years, 191 days	18th (2022 election)	Yogi Adityanath	Bharatiya Janata Party
6		Brajesh Pathak	Lucknow Cantonment	25 March 2022	Incumbent	4 years, 185 days	18th (2022 election)	Yogi Adityanath	Bharatiya Janata Party

== Statistics ==
List of deputy chief ministers by length of term

No.	Name	Party	Length of term	
No.	Name	Party	Longest continuous term	Total years of deputy chief ministership
1	Keshav Prasad Maurya	BJP	9 years, 191 days	9 years, 191 days
2	Dinesh Sharma	BJP	5 years, 6 days	5 years, 6 days
3	Brajesh Pathak	BJP	4 years, 185 days	4 years, 185 days
4	Kamalapati Tripathi	INC	356 days	356 days
5	Ram Naresh Yadav	JP	354 days	354 days
6	Narain Singh	Independent	328 days	328 days
7	Ram Chandra Vikal	Independent	328 days	328 days
8	Ram Prakash Gupta	BJS	328 days	328 days

== Oath as the state deputy chief minister ==
The deputy chief minister serves five years in the office. The following is the oath of the Deputy chief minister of state:

I, <Name of Deputy Chief Minister>, do swear in the name of God/solemnly affirm that I will bear true faith and allegiance to the Constitution of India as by law established, that I will uphold the sovereignty and integrity of India, that I will faithfully and conscientiously discharge my duties as a Minister for the State of () and that I will do right to all manner of people in accordance with the Constitution and the law without fear or favour, affection or ill-will.

Oath of Secrecy

"I, [Name], do swear in the name of God / solemnly affirm that I will not directly or indirectly communicate or reveal to any person or persons any matter which shall be brought under my consideration or shall become known to me as a Minister for the State of [Name of State] except as may be required for the due discharge of my duties as such Minister."Pad ki Shapath (Oath of Office) "Main, [DCM ka Naam], Ishwar ki shapath leta hoon / satyanishtha se pratigyan karta hoon ki main vidhi dwara sthapit Bharat ke Samvidhan ke prati sachi shraddha aur nishtha rakhunga. Main Bharat ki prabhuta aur akhandta akshunn rakhunga. Main [State ka Naam] ke Rajya ke Upa Mukhya Mantri ke roop mein apne kartavyon ka shraddhapoorvak aur shuddh antahkaran se nirvahan karunga, tatha main bhay ya pakshpat, anurag ya dwesh ke bina, sabhi prakar ke logon ke prati Samvidhan aur vidhi ke anusar nyay karunga." B. Gopniyata ki Shapath (Oath of Secrecy) "Main, [DCM ka Naam], Ishwar ki shapath leta hoon / satyanishtha se pratigyan karta hoon ki jo vishay [State ka Naam] ke Rajya ke Mukhya Mantri ke roop mein mere vichar ke liye laya jayega athva mujhe gyaat hoga, use kisi vyakti ya vyaktityon ko, tab ke sivay jab ki aise UpaMukhya Mantri ke roop mein apne kartavyon ke uchit nirvahan ke liye aisa karna apekshit ho, main pratyaksh (directly) ya apratyaksh (indirectly) roop mein sansuchit ya prakat nahi karunga."==See also ==

- List of current Indian deputy chief ministers
