= Yogi Adityanath ministry =

Yogi Adityanath ministry may refer to:

- First Yogi Adityanath ministry, the 17th government of Uttar Pradesh headed by Yogi Adityanath from 2017 to 2022
- Second Yogi Adityanath ministry, the 18th government of Uttar Pradesh headed by Yogi Adityanath from 2022 onwards
