= Jaswant Singh Saini =

Indian Politician

Minister of State of Parliamentary Affairs of Uttar Pradesh, Industrial Development
- Incumbent
- Assumed office 25 March 2022
- Appointed by: Yogi Adityanath
- Chief Minister: Yogi Adityanath

Member of Uttar Pradesh Legislative Council
- Incumbent
- Assumed office 6 July 2022
- Chief Minister: Yogi Adityanath

Personal details
- Party: BJP
- Occupation: Politician

Jaswant Singh Saini is an Indian politician and Minister of State in the Government of Uttar Pradesh. He is a member of the Uttar Pradesh Legislative Council and represents Bharatiya Janata Party.

== Political career ==
On 25 March 2022, the Chief Minister of Uttar Pradesh, Yogi Adityanath, appointed Jaswant Saini as the Minister of State of Parliamentary Affairs in Uttar Pradesh government.
