= Agra South Assembly constituency =

Constituency of the Uttar Pradesh legislative assembly in India

Agra South ( आगरा दक्षिण )
- Constituency No. 88 for the Uttar Pradesh Legislative Assembly

Constituency details
- Country: India
- Region: North India
- State: Uttar Pradesh
- District: Agra
- Total electors: 3,58,858 (2019)
- Reservation: None

Member of Legislative Assembly
- 18th Uttar Pradesh Legislative Assembly
- Incumbent Yogendra Upadhyaya
- Party: Bharatiya Janata Party
- Elected year: 2008

Agra South Assembly constituency is one of the 403 constituencies of the Uttar Pradesh Legislative Assembly, India. It is a part of the Agra district and one of the five assembly constituencies in the Agra Lok Sabha constituency. First assembly election in this assembly constituency was conducted in 2012 after the constituency came into existence in the year 2008 as a result of the "Delimitation of Parliamentary and Assembly Constituencies Order, 2008".

== Wards / Areas ==
Agra South Assembly constituency comprises ward numbers 4, 8, 9, 10, 11, 15, 18, 23, 25, 29, 30, 36 to 39, 41, 44, 49, 56, 57, 58, 63, 64, 67, 69, 71, 72, 74 to 77 & 80 in Agra municipal corporation.

== Members of the Legislative Assembly ==
Year	Member	Party
2012	Yogendra Upadhyaya	Bharatiya Janata Party
2017	Yogendra Upadhyaya	Bharatiya Janata Party
2022	Yogendra Upadhyaya	Bharatiya Janata Party

== Election results ==
=== 2027 ===
2027 Uttar Pradesh Legislative Assembly election: Agra South
Party	Candidate	Votes	%	±%
INDIA				
NDA				
BSP				
NOTA	None of the above			
Majority				
Turnout				
gain from		Swing		

=== 2022 ===
2022 Uttar Pradesh Legislative Assembly election: Agra South
Party	Candidate	Votes	%	±%
BJP	Yogendra Upadhyaya	109,262	52.39	▲0.88
SP	Vinay Agrawal	52,622	25.23	
BSP	Ravi Bharadwaj	38,219	18.32	▼8.22
INC	Anuj Sharma	4,867	2.33	▼15.82
NOTA	None of the above	949	0.46	▲0.11
Majority		56,640	27.16	▲2.19
Turnout		208,569	56.75	▼5.51
BJP hold		Swing		

=== 2017 ===
U. P. Legislative Assembly Election, 2017: Agra South
Party	Candidate	Votes	%	±%
BJP	Yogendra Upadhyaya	111,882	51.51	
BSP	Zulfiquar Ahmed Bhutto	57,657	26.54	
INC	Nazir Ahmed	39,434	18.15	
NOTA	None of the above	753	0.35	
Majority		54,225	24.97	
Turnout		217,225	62.26	
BJP hold		Swing		

=== 2012 ===
U. P. Legislative Assembly Election, 2012: Agra South
Party	Candidate	Votes	%	±%
BJP	Yogendra Upadhyaya	74,324	37.77	
BSP	Zulfiquar Ahmed Bhutto	51,364	26.10	
INC	Nazir Ahmed	39,962	20.31	
SP	Mohammad Sareef Usmani	13,408	6.81	
RSMD	Chaudhary Basheer	9,211	4.68	
IND.	Sanjay Kumar Garg	2,013	1.02	
Majority		22,960	11.66	
Turnout		1,96,782	59.85	
BJP win (new seat)				

== See also ==
- Agra district
- Agra Lok Sabha constituency
- Government of Uttar Pradesh
- List of Vidhan Sabha constituencies of Uttar Pradesh
- Uttar Pradesh
- Uttar Pradesh Legislative Assembly
