= Kaiserganj Assembly constituency =

Constituency of the Uttar Pradesh legislative assembly in India

Coordinates: 27.25°N 81.55°E

Kaiserganj
- Constituency No. 288 for the Uttar Pradesh Legislative Assembly

Constituency details
- Country: India
- Region: North India
- State: Uttar Pradesh
- District: Bahraich
- Total electors: 3,90,653
- Reservation: None

Member of Legislative Assembly
- 18th Uttar Pradesh Legislative Assembly
- Incumbent Anand Kumar Yadav
- Party: SP
- Elected year: 2022

Kaiserganj is an assembly constituency of the Uttar Pradesh Legislative Assembly covering the city of Kaiserganj in the Bahraich district of Uttar Pradesh, India. Kaiserganj is one of five assembly constituencies in the Kaiserganj Lok Sabha constituency. Since 2008, this assembly constituency is numbered 288 amongst 403 constituencies.

== Members of the Legislative Assembly ==
Election	Name	Party
2012	Mukut Bihari	Bharatiya Janata Party
2017	Mukut Bihari	Bharatiya Janata Party
2022	Anand Kumar	Samajwadi Party

== Election results ==
=== 2027 ===
2027 Uttar Pradesh Legislative Assembly election: Kaiserganj
Party	Candidate	Votes	%	±%
INDIA				
NDA				
BSP				
NOTA	None of the above			
Majority				
Turnout				
gain from		Swing		

=== 2022 ===
2022 Uttar Pradesh Legislative Assembly election: Kaiserganj
Party	Candidate	Votes	%	±%
SP	Anand Kumar	103,135	45.51	+19.68
BJP	Gaurav Verma	95,424	42.11	+1.44
BSP	Baqaullah	13,850	6.11	−21.5
AIMIM	Mo Bilal Ansari	4,762	2.1	+0.33
NOTA	None of the above	2,465	1.09	−0.51
Majority		7,711	3.4	−9.66
Turnout		226,617	58.01	+1.57
SP gain from BJP		Swing		

=== 2017 ===
Bharatiya Janta Party candidate Mukut Bihari won in 2017 Uttar Pradesh Legislative Elections defeating Bahujan Samaj Party candidate Khalid Khan by a margin of 27,363 votes.

2017 Uttar Pradesh Legislative Assembly Election: Kaisergan
Party	Candidate	Votes	%	±%
BJP	Mukut Bihari	85,212	40.67	
BSP	Khalid Khan	57,849	27.61	
SP	Ramtej Yadav	54,117	25.83	
AIMIM	Danish Jameel	3,719	1.77	
RLD	Raj Bahadur	2,963	1.41	
NOTA	None of the above	3,291	1.6	
Majority		27,363	13.06	
Turnout		209,536	56.44	
