= Asim Arun =

Indian politician

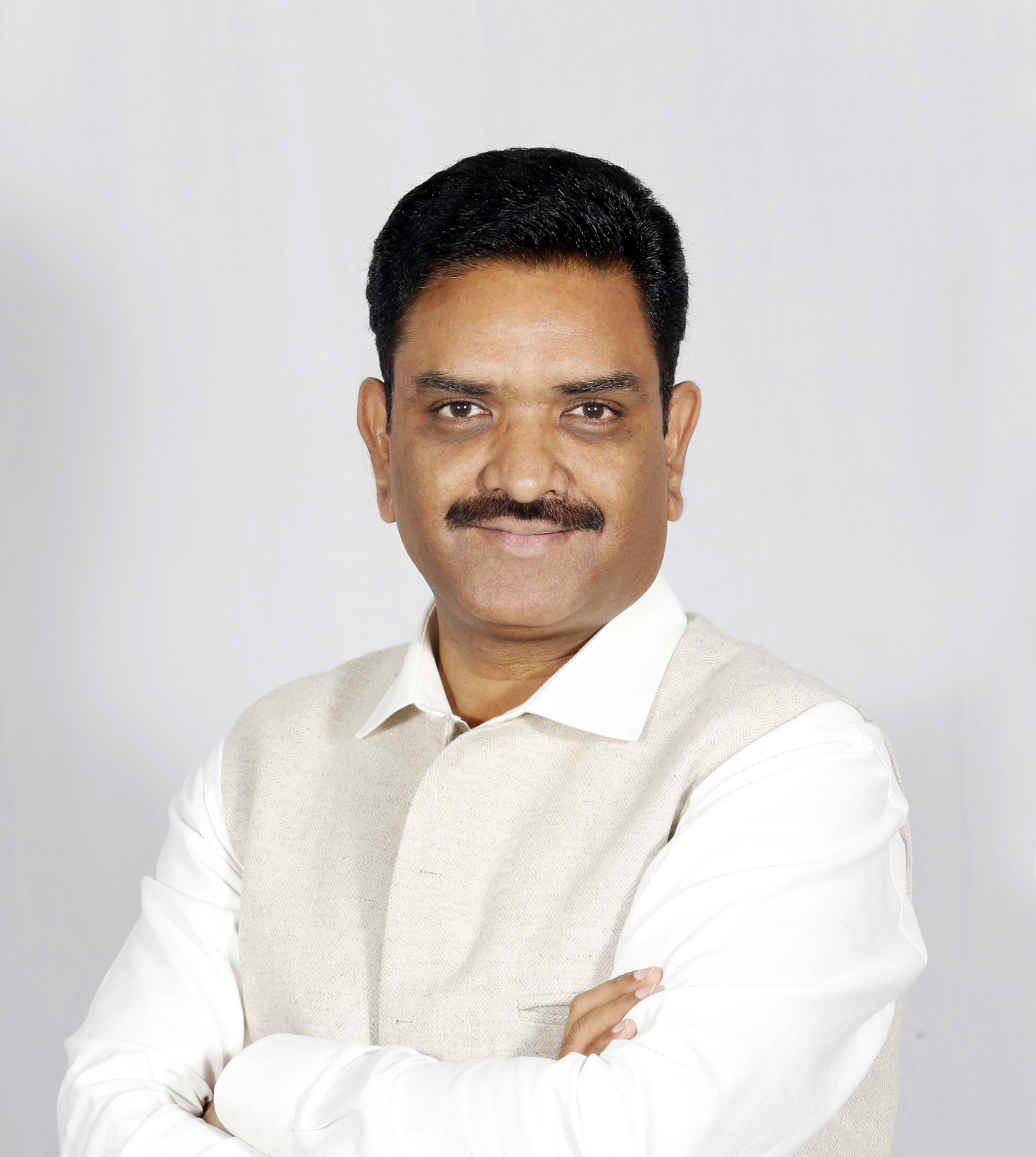

Minister of State (Independent Charge) Government of Uttar Pradesh
- Incumbent
- Assumed office 25 March 2022
- Governor: Anandiben Patel
- Chief Minister: Yogi Adityanath
- Ministry & Department's: Social Welfare; SC/ST Welfare

Member of Uttar Pradesh Legislative Assembly
- Incumbent
- Assumed office 10 March 2022
- Preceded by: Anil Kumar Dohare
- Constituency: Kannauj
- Majority: 6,090

Personal details
- Born: 3 October 1970 (age 56) Budaun, Uttar Pradesh, India
- Party: Bharatiya Janata Party
- Education: St. Stephen's College, Delhi; Delhi University; University of British Columbia

Asim Arun (born 3 October 1970; sometimes spelt Aseem Arun) is an Indian politician and retired 1994 Batch Indian Police Service officer who is currently serving as the member of Uttar Pradesh Legislative Assembly from Kannauj Sadar since March 2022. He is a member of Bharatiya Janata Party. He is a Minister of State (Independent Charge) Social welfare & SC/ST Welfare in Second Yogi Adityanath ministry.

== Early life and education ==
Asim Arun was born on 3 October 1970 in Budaun, Uttar Pradesh. His family has its roots in the village Khair Nagar, Tirwa, Kannauj, Uttar Pradesh. His hometown is Lucknow, Uttar Pradesh. Asim completed his class 12 from St. Francis' College, Lucknow, in 1988. He then attended St. Stephen’s College, Delhi, from 1988 to 1991 to pursue a Bachelor of Science (B. Sc.). Thereafter, he cleared the Civil Services Examination and opted for the Indian Police Service. He joined the Indian Police Service in 1994, and later, obtained an MA in Public Policy from the University of British Columbia, Canada (2014-2016). He was good at extra-curricular activities in his college days and was a part of the Shakespeare Society of his college (St. Stephen’s College, Delhi).

== Police service ==
Selected to the elite Indian Police Service in 1994, he served as District Police Chief in Agra, Aligarh, Hathras, Gorakhpur, etc.

His last posting was as Commissioner of Police, Kanpur Nagar.

The first IPS officer to volunteer and successfully complete the NSG's Black Cat Commando Course, he was chosen to Head the Close Protection Team (AIG CPT) of Special Protection Group for the then Prime Minister, Dr. Manmohan Singh (2004–08).

Project Seva 100

In 2008, in Aligarh Arun initiated a professionally run police helpline 100 system. Highly acclaimed for its robust processes and assured response time, it introduced a new manner of functioning. He grew it in Hathras, Gorakhpur and Agra while heading these police districts. As Inspector General (Police Telecom), the same system but with better technology, was implemented in the Modern Police Control Rooms in Lucknow, Kanpur, Ghaziabad and, Prayagraj.

COVID-19 Response by UP 112

During the COVID-19 lockdown in March–April 2020, UP 112 swiftly modified its operations to become the primary agency responsible for receiving requests for humanitarian aid and providing the same through its Police Response Vehicles and Police Station's vehicles. During this operation, Arun was the Chief of UP 112.

== Political career ==
On January 8, 2022 Arun announced that he would leave the IPS and begin a political career with the Bharatiya Janata Party.

He won the UP Assembly election from Kannauj Sadar, a stronghold of the Samajwadi Party for a longtime.

He surprised everyone by visiting his rival candidate, Anil Doharey of Samajwadi Party, right after the announcement of the result, a courtesy rarely seen in Indian politics.

== Education ==
Arun graduated from St. Stephens College, Delhi in 1991. In 2016, he completed a Masters in Public Policy at the University of British Columbia, Vancouver, Canada, while on study leave from the Indian Police Service. At the University of British Columbia he was very active with the Centre for India and South Asia Research (CISAR).

== Award and honours ==
Asim Arun is a recipient of the following medals:

1. Police Medal for Gallantry for an encounter in which ISIS terrorist, Saifullah died (March 8, 2017). Arun was Chief of Uttar Pradesh Police's Anti Terrorist Squad.

2. President of India's Police Medal for Distinguished Services.

3. President of India's Medal for Meritorious Service

4. UN Medal for service in Kosovo (UNMIK)

5. DGP Uttar Pradesh's Platinum Commendation Disc
