= Kamalapati Tripathi =

Indian politician

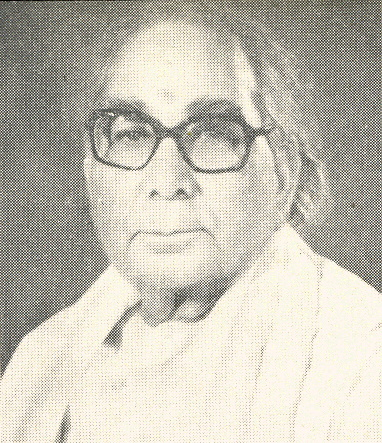

15th Minister of Railways
- In office 14 January 1980 – 12 November 1980
- Prime Minister: Indira Gandhi
- Preceded by: T. A. Pai
- Succeeded by: Kedar Pandey
- In office 11 February 1975 – 23 March 1977
- Prime Minister: Indira Gandhi
- Preceded by: Lalit Narayan Mishra
- Succeeded by: Madhu Dandavate

7th Chief Minister of Uttar Pradesh
- In office 4 April 1971 – 13 June 1973
- Preceded by: Tribhuvan Narain Singh
- Succeeded by: President's rule

2nd Deputy Chief Minister of Uttar Pradesh
- In office 26 February 1969 – 17 February 1970
- Chief Minister: Chandra Bhanu Gupta
- Preceded by: Ram Chandra Vikal, Narain Singh, Ram Prakash Gupta
- Succeeded by: Ram Naresh Yadav

Working President of Indian National Congress
- In office 28 January 1983 – 12 November 1986
- President: Indira Gandhi; Rajiv Gandhi
- Preceded by: Position established
- Succeeded by: Position abolished

Personal details
- Born: 3 September 1905 Benares, Benares State, British India
- Died: 8 October 1990 (aged 85) Varanasi, Uttar Pradesh, India
- Party: Indian National Congress

Kamalapati Tripathi (3 September 1905 – 8 October 1990) was an Indian politician, writer, journalist, and independence activist. He was a senior Indian National Congress leader from Varanasi constituency. He served as Chief Minister of Uttar Pradesh (1969–1970) as well as Union Minister for Railways. He was the only (executive) working president of Indian National Congress, serving from 1983 to 1986.

== Family ==
Kamlapati Tripathi was born on 3 September 1905 to a Saryupareen Brahmin family. His father's name was Pandit Narayan Pati Tripathi. He had three sons and two daughters. The eldest son was Lokpati Tripathi who was also a minister in Uttar Pradesh, his second son was Mayapati Tripathi who founded the social organisation by the name of Akhil Bharatiya Kissan Mazdoor Vahini. His youngest son was Manglapati Tripathi (also called Shashipati Tripathi).

== Early years ==
Tripathi started his career as a journalist working for the daily Hindi newspaper Aaj and later Sansaar. He was also the editor of the two tabloids.

== Political career ==
=== Indian independence movement ===
During 1921, Kamalapati Tripathi participated in the non-cooperation movement. He was also an active participant in the Civil Disobedience Movement, for which he was jailed. In 1942 he was on his way to Mumbai to participate in the Quit India Movement when he was arrested and jailed for 3 years. Kamalapati Tripathi was elected to the Constituent Assembly from United Province on Congress Party ticket and played an important part in the drafting of the Constitution of India.

=== Chief Minister of Uttar Pradesh ===
He remained Chief Minister of Uttar Pradesh from 4 April 1971 until 12 June 1973. His resignation was a result of the 1973 Provincial Armed Constabulary revolt.

=== Union Minister for Railways ===
He was Union Minister for Railways two times first from 1975 to 1977 and then briefly in 1980. He presented Railway Budget of India four times: 1975–76, 1976–77, 1980–81 (interim) and 1980–81 (final). Following trains were introduced during his tenure:

- Sabarmati Express
- Ganga Kaveri Express
- Neelambari Express
- Varanasi Express (Delhi-Lucknow Exp. extended)
- Tamil Nadu Express
- Kashi Vishwanath Express

An 8-kilometer-long new Railway line between Telapur-Patanchera was opened during his tenure.

The Diesel Loco Shed in Pune was started in his tenure.

=== Working President of INC ===
After the death of son Sanjay Gandhi in a plane crash, Indira Gandhi made Tripathi the working president. But, after the Assassination of Indira Gandhi, Rajiv Gandhi sworn in as Congress President and Prime Minister of India, Tripathi made conflict with him. In November 1986, he resigned.

== As an author ==
He authored following works:

- Bandi Ki Chetna, 1946
- Bapu aur Bharat,
  - Barcode : 1990010092576
  - Country : India
  - Language : Hindi
  - Edition : Hardcover (386 pages)
  - Publisher : Saraswati Mandir (1945)
- Bapu Aur Manawata,
  - Barcode : 1990010092577
  - Country : India
  - Language : Hindi
  - Edition : Hardcover (413 pages)
  - Publisher : Saraswati Mandir (1945)
- Gandhi and Humanity
  - ISBN: ISBN 978-81-7156-335-7
  - Country : India
  - Language : English
  - Edition : Hardcover (248 pages)
  - Publisher : Atlantic Publishers & Distributors (1993)
- Freedom movement and afterwards
  - ISBN: ISBN 978-81-7124-041-8
  - Country : India
  - Language : English
  - Edition : Hardcover (228 pages)
  - Publisher : Vishwavidyalaya Prakashan (1989)

Political offices
Preceded by Tribhuvana Narayana Singh	Chief Minister of Uttar Pradesh; 4 April 1971 – 12 June 1973	Succeeded by President's Rule; Administered by the Governor of Uttar Pradesh, Akbar Ali Khan title/post subsequently held by- Hemwati Nandan Bahuguna
Preceded by Lalit Narayan Mishra	Union Minister for Railways; 1975 – 1977	Succeeded by Madhu Dandavate
Preceded by Madhu Dandavate	Union Minister for Railways; 1980	Succeeded by Kedar Pandey
