= Vijay Laxmi Gautam =

Indian politician

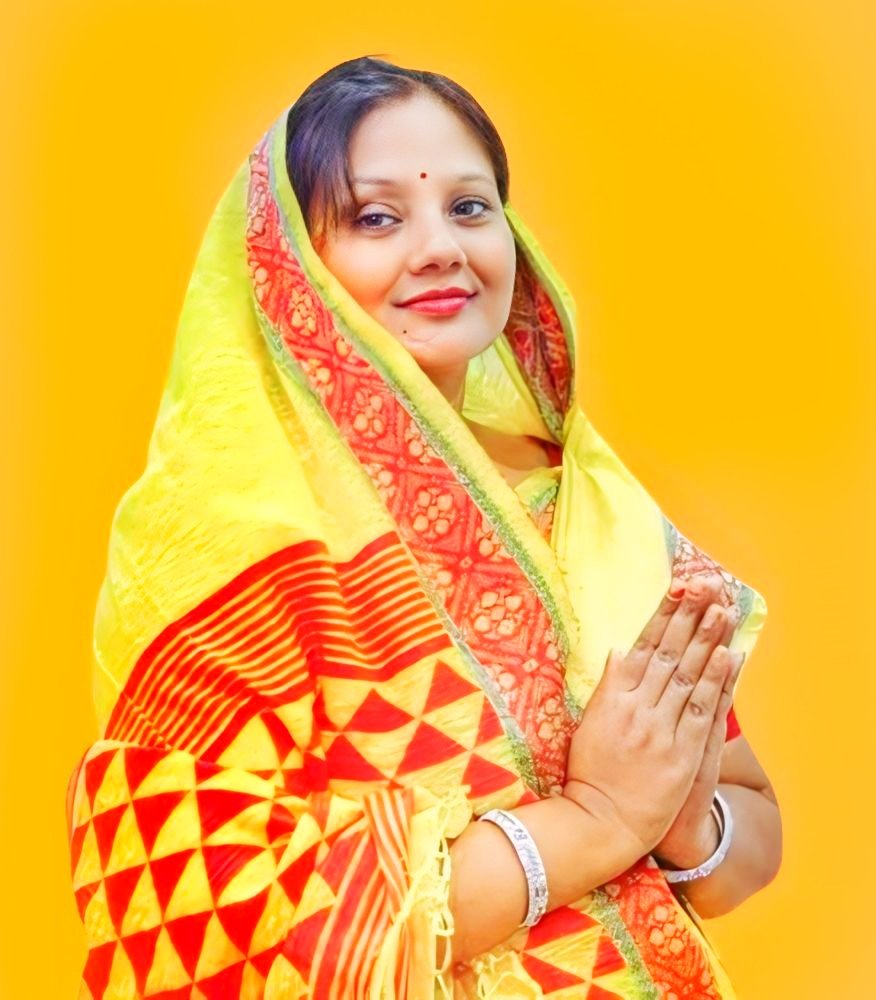

State Minister of Rural Development
- Incumbent
- Assumed office 25 March 2022
- Governor: Anandiben Patel

Member of the 18th Legislative Assembly
- Incumbent
- Assumed office March 2022
- Preceded by: Manbodh
- Constituency: Salempur

Personal details
- Party: BJP
- Profession: Politician

Vijay Laxmi Gautam is an Indian politician and State Minister of Rural Development in the Government of Uttar Pradesh and a member of 18th Uttar Pradesh Assembly. She represents the Salempur constituency of Uttar Pradesh. She is a member of the Bharatiya Janata Party.

Earlier she was in Samajwadi Party. In the 2017 election she fought on the SP ticket against the Bhartiya Janata Party

== Political career ==
Following the 2022 Uttar Pradesh Legislative Assembly election, she was elected as an MLA from the Salempur Assembly constituency, defeating Manbodh Prasad, the candidate from the Suheldev Bharatiya Samaj Party (SBSP), by the margin of 16,608 votes.

On March 25, 2022, the Chief Minister of Uttar Pradesh, Yogi Adityanath, appointed Vijay Laxmi Gautam as the Minister of Rural Development in Uttar Pradesh government.
