= 1973 Uttar Pradesh Provincial Armed Constabulary revolt =

Indian strike

The 1973 Uttar Pradesh Provincial Armed Constabulary revolt was a mutiny by three Battalions of Uttar Pradesh Provincial Armed Constabulary located in Bareilly, Meerut and Agra, in May 1973 in demand of better pay, work conditions, etc. The army was called in to control the mutiny, which resulted in about 30 policemen shot dead and other hundreds arrested and also brought great damages to the Indian army. It led to the resignation of the Congress ministry headed by Kamalapati Tripathi.
