= Anand Kumar (Kaiserganj politician) =

Indian politician

Member of the Uttar Pradesh Legislative Assembly
- Incumbent
- Assumed office March 2022
- Constituency: Kaiserganj Assembly constituency

Personal details
- Born: 1968 (age 57–58)
- Party: Samajwadi Party
- Education: Lucknow University
- Occupation: Politician

Anand Kumar (born 1968) is an Indian politician from Uttar Pradesh. He is a member of the Uttar Pradesh Legislative Assembly from the Kaiserganj Assembly constituency in Bahraich district. He won the 2022 Uttar Pradesh Legislative Assembly election representing the Samajwadi Party.

== Early life and education ==
Kumar is from Kaiserganj, Bahraich district, Uttar Pradesh. He is the son of Shivpaltan. He completed his LLB in 1990 at Lucknow University.

== Career ==
Kumar won from Kaiserganj Assembly constituency representing Samajwadi Party in the 2022 Uttar Pradesh Legislative Assembly election. He polled 103,195 votes and defeated his nearest rival, Gaurav Verma of the Bharatiya Janata Party, by a margin of 7,771 votes.
