= Daya Shankar Mishra =

Indian politician (born 1972)

Daya Shankar "Dayalu" Mishra
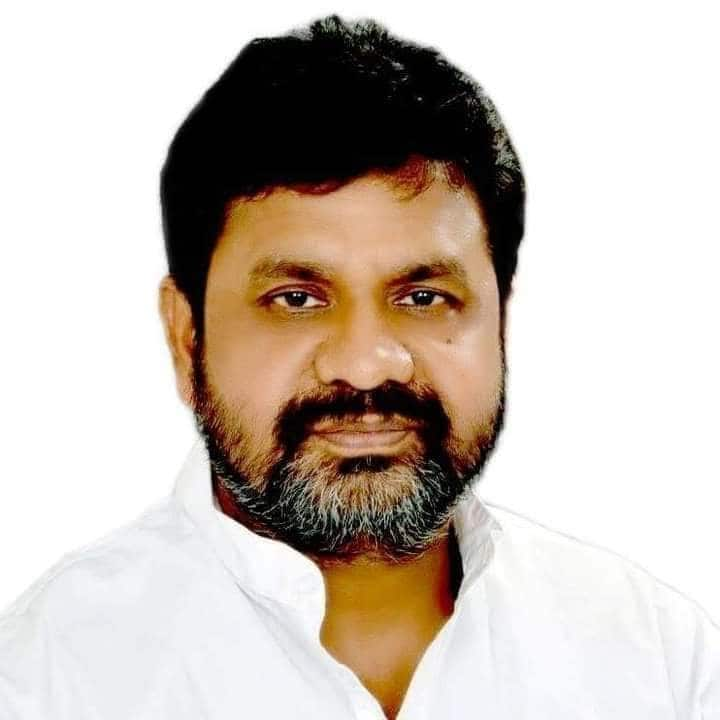
- Official portrait, 2022

Minister of State (Independent Charge)
- Incumbent
- Assumed office 25 March 2022
- Chief Minister: Yogi Adityanath
- Ministry & Departments: AYUSH; Food Security (MOS); Drug Administration (MOS)
- Preceded by: Neelkanth Tiwari

Member of Uttar Pradesh Legislative Council
- Incumbent
- Assumed office 2022
- Preceded by: Yogi Adityanath
- Constituency: elected by Legislative Assembly members

Personal details
- Born: 27 June 1972 (age 53) Ghazipur, Uttar Pradesh, India
- Party: Bharatiya Janata Party
- Other political affiliations: Indian National Congress

Dr. Daya Shankar Mishra (born 27 June 1972), also known as Dayalu, is an Indian politician from Uttar Pradesh serving as a Minister of State in the Second Yogi Adityanath Cabinet. He had fought the 2007 and 2012 Assembly elections from Varanasi South constituency over Indian National Congress symbol.
