= Kannauj Assembly constituency =

Constituency of the Uttar Pradesh legislative assembly in India

Coordinates: 27.05°N 79.92°E

Kannauj
- Constituency No. 198 for the Uttar Pradesh Legislative Assembly

Constituency details
- Country: India
- Region: North India
- State: Uttar Pradesh
- District: Kannauj
- Total electors: 4,28,851
- Reservation: SC

Member of Legislative Assembly
- 18th Uttar Pradesh Legislative Assembly
- Incumbent Asim Arun
- Party: BJP
- Elected year: 2022

Kannauj is a constituency of the Uttar Pradesh Legislative Assembly covering the city of Kannauj in the Kannauj district of Uttar Pradesh, India.

Kannauj is one of five assembly constituencies in the Kannauj Lok Sabha constituency. Since 2008, this assembly constituency is numbered 198 amongst 403 constituencies.

Currently this seat belongs to BJP candidate Asim Arun who won in last Assembly election of 2022 Uttar Pradesh Legislative Elections defeating Samajwadi Party candidate.

== Members of Legislative Assembly ==
Year	Member	Party
1952	Kali Charan Tandon	Indian National Congress
1957	Dwarka	Praja Socialist Party
1957	Hori Lal	Praja Socialist Party
1962	Pati Ram	Indian National Congress
1967	Pati Ram	Indian National Congress
1969	Beharilal Dohare	Bharatiya Kranti Dal
1974	Jhamlal Ahirwar	Bharatiya Jana Sangh
1977	Jhamlal Ahirwar	Janata Party
1980	Beharilal Dohare	Indian National Congress (I)
1985	Beharilal Dohare	Indian National Congress
1989	Kalyan Singh Dohare	Janata Dal
1991	Banwari Lal Dohre	Bharatiya Janata Party
1993	Banwari Lal Dohre	Bharatiya Janata Party
1996	Banwari Lal Dohre	Bharatiya Janata Party
2002	Kalyan Singh Dohare	Samajwadi Party
2007	Anil Kumar Dohre	Samajwadi Party
2012	Anil Kumar Dohre	Samajwadi Party
2017	Anil Kumar Dohre	Samajwadi Party
2022	Asim Arun	Bharatiya Janata Party

== Election results ==
=== 2027 ===
2027 Uttar Pradesh Legislative Assembly election: Kannauj
Party	Candidate	Votes	%	±%
INDIA				
NDA				
BSP				
NOTA	None of the above			
Majority				
Turnout				
gain from		Swing		

=== 2022 ===
2022 Uttar Pradesh Legislative Assembly election: Kannauj
Party	Candidate	Votes	%	±%
BJP	Asim Arun	120,876	44.53	+5.35
SP	Anil Kumar Dohare	114,786	42.29	+2.12
BSP	Samajet Dohare	26,239	9.67	−8.14
AIMIM	Sunil Kumar	4,482	1.65	
NOTA	None of the above	1,674	0.62	−0.07
Majority		6,090	2.24	+1.25
Turnout		271,435	63.29	−1.05
BJP gain from SP		Swing		

=== 2017 ===
2017 Uttar Pradesh Legislative Assembly election: Kannauj
Party	Candidate	Votes	%	±%
SP	Anil Kumar Dohare	99,635	40.17	
BJP	Banwari Lal Dohare	97,181	39.18	
BSP	Anurag Singh	44,182	17.81	
NOTA	None of the above	1,706	0.69	
Majority		2,454	0.99	
Turnout		248,056	64.34	
SP hold		Swing		
