= Satish Chandra Sharma (politician) =

Indian politician (born 1983)

Minister of State for Food and Civil Supplies of Uttar Pradesh
- Incumbent
- Assumed office 25 March 2022
- Appointed by: Yogi Adityanath
- Chief Minister: Yogi Adityanath

Member of 17th Uttar Pradesh Assembly
- In office 2017–2022
- Preceded by: Rajeev Kumar Singh
- Constituency: Dariyabad

Member of 18th Uttar Pradesh Assembly
- Incumbent
- Assumed office 2022
- Preceded by: Himself
- Constituency: Dariyabad

Personal details
- Born: 15 February 1983 (age 43) Barabanki, Uttar Pradesh, India
- Party: Bharatiya Janata Party
- Spouse: Preeti Sharma
- Children: 2 Sons; 1 Daughter
- Parent: Shri Raj Kumar Sharma (father)
- Education: Postgraduate
- Occupation: Politician
- Profession: Teaching

Satish Chandra Sharma (born 15 February 1983) is an Indian politician and a member of the 17th and 18th Uttar Pradesh Assembly for Uttar Pradesh, India. He represents the Dariyabad constituency of Uttar Pradesh. He is a member of the Bharatiya Janata Party.

== Career ==
Following the 2022 Uttar Pradesh Legislative Assembly election, he was elected as an MLA from the Dariyabad Assembly constituency, defeating Arvind Singh Gop, the candidate from the Samajwadi Party (SP), by a margin of 32,402 votes.

On 25 March 2022, the Chief Minister of Uttar Pradesh, Yogi Adityanath, appointed Satish Chandra Sharma as the Minister of State for Food and Civil Supplies in the Uttar Pradesh government.
