= Mohsin Raza =

Indian politician

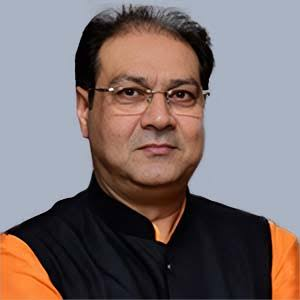

Minister of State for Minority Welfare, Muslim Waqf and Hajj Government of Uttar Pradesh
- In office 19 March 2017 – 25 March 2022
- Succeeded by: Danish Azad Ansari

Member of the Uttar Pradesh Legislative Council
- In office 18 Sep 2017 – 5 May 2024
- Preceded by: Thakur Jaiveer Singh
- Succeeded by: Yogesh Choudhary
- Constituency: elected by Legislative Assembly members

Personal details
- Born: 15 January 1968 (age 58) Unnao, Uttar Pradesh, India
- Party: Bharatiya Janata Party
- Spouse: Fauzia Sarwar Fatima (m. 2001)

Mohsin Raza (born 15 January 1968) is an Indian politician from the state of Uttar Pradesh. He served as the Minister of State for Minority Welfare, Muslim Waqf and Hajj of the state in the Yogi Adityanath ministry.

Raza is a Muslim by faith and comes from a family of landowners that traces their roots to the city of Sufis Safipur. He represented Uttar Pradesh in the Ranji Trophy. He also had a career in modelling and acting, and was also crowned as Prince Lucknow in 1995. In 2013, he joined the Bharatiya Janata Party and was elevated to the post of its spokesperson. Following the party's victory in the 2017 Assembly election of Uttar Pradesh, he was made a Minister of State and given the portfolios of Science & Technology, Information Technology & Electronics, Muslim Waqf and Haj of the state & Incharge of Amethi. In August 2019 (Uttar Pradesh Cabinet Reshuffle) Raza was appointed Minister of State for Minority Welfare, Muslim Waqf & Hajj.

== Education ==
8th pass from Mahatma gandhi inter college, Safipur, Unnao, 1981-82.

== Personal life ==
Raza was born in Unnao (the city of Uttar Pradesh state) on 15 January 1968. He hails from a family of zamindars (landowners) which traces its roots to the city of Sufis Safipur. He is the son of Late Syed Jina Raza Naqvi. Father Jina was known as a person of great perseverance. Raza is a Shia by faith. His wife Fauzia Sarwar Fatima is a daughter of time- honoured Businessman and belongs to a Sunni Family. She contested a local election in Safipur. They have two children.

== Early career ==
Raza started his cricketing career with the MRF Pace Foundation (located in Chennai) and went on to represent his state, Uttar Pradesh in the Ranji Trophy in First-class cricket.

Raza also had a career in modelling and in the film industry. He acted in the television drama Neem ka Ped which aired in DD National. He was also crowned winner of the "Prince Lucknow" title in 1995.

== Political career ==
His political career was inspired by Atal Bihari Vajpayee. Prior to the 2014 Indian general election, Raza joined the Bharatiya Janata Party and was made the spokesperson of the party in 2015. The 2017 Assembly election was won by the Bharatiya Janata Party with Yogi Adityanath being sworn in as the chief minister of the state. The party did not field any Muslim candidate in any one of the 403 assembly constituencies. He was made a Minister of State and given the portfolios of Science & Technology, Information Technology & Electronics, Muslim Waqf and Haj and became the only Muslim in the ministry of Yogi Adityanath. With Raza not being a member of either Uttar Pradesh Legislative Assembly or Uttar Pradesh Legislative Council, it was required for him to get elected to any of the bodies within six months of his appointment.

On 11 September 2017, Raza was elected unopposed to the Legislative Council.

== Views ==
=== Bharatiya Janata Party ===
Raza is of the opinion that the Bharatiya Janata Party is not an anti-Islamic party. According to him, the Indian National Congress party has made the Muslim community feel that the Bharatiya Janata Party is against Muslims. He also said that his party did not indulge in the politics of votebank.

=== Triple Talaq ===
Triple Talaq is a controversial method of unilateral divorce amongst Muslims where the husband divorces his wife by announcing the word "Talaq" thrice. Raza feels that this practice is against the Constitution of India and should be banned. He also said that a new law for divorce must be drafted and this practice harasses woman. He is also of the opinion of banning the All India Muslim Personal Law Board for supporting the Triple Talaq.

=== All India Muslim Personal Law Board ===
Mohsin Raza called for a ban on All India Muslim Personal Law Board for supporting triple talaq and described it as an unconstitutional entity ."AIMPLB should not be called Muslim Personal Law Board but a Maulawi (cleric) Personal Law Board. Such an organisation should be banned as it does not work for the welfare of society but endorses a practice like triple talaq which is exploitation of women,“ Mohsin said.

=== Madrassas in mainstream education ===
The Uttar Pradesh minister Raza favoured introducing a "new dress code" for students at madrassas (Islamic schools) across the country and added that he will take up the issue with the centre. He added government in Uttar Pradesh wants to bring madrassas in the mainstream education system. "And why only in UP, I think all these religious institutions across the country should be brought into mainstream", he told PTI. Raza said he intends to discuss the issue with Prime Minister Narendra Modi.

=== Haj Subsidy ===
Raza says It is the poor who deserve government subsidy for Haj pilgrimage, not the affluent Muslims, He added that it would be his priority to ensure 'deserving Muslims' get Haj subsidy. "We will only let jayaz (deserving) persons, who don’t have means to go on their own, to go. If a person is a multi-millionaire he should not make the pilgrimage on government money. We are reviewing the rules and will announce a decision soon."
