= Dinesh Pratap Singh =

Indian politician

Minister of State (Independent Charge) Government of Uttar Pradesh
- Incumbent
- Assumed office 25 March 2022
- Chief Minister: Yogi Adityanath
- Ministry & Department's: Horticulture; Agricultural Exports; Marketing; Foreign Trade

Member of Uttar Pradesh Legislative Council
- Incumbent
- Assumed office 16 Jan 2010
- Constituency: Raebareli local authorities

Personal details
- Born: 3 October 1967 (age 59) Raebareli, Uttar Pradesh, India
- Party: Bharatiya Janata Party
- Other political affiliations: Indian National Congress
- Relations: 5 brothers (including him)
- Education: Feroze Gandhi Polytechnic, Kanpur University
- Occupation: Politician
- Profession: Politician
- Website: https://dineshpratapsingh.com/

Dinesh Pratap Singh is an Indian politician. He is a member of the Bharatiya Janata Party (BJP) since 2018, before that he was a member of the Indian National Congress.

He has served as a member of the Uttar Pradesh Legislative Council from 2010, formerly as a member of the INC and, from 2022, the BJP.

He also contested the 16th Lok Sabha Elections against Sonia Gandhi from Rae Bareli (Lok Sabha constituency), losing by 167,178 votes. He further lost the 17th Lok Sabha election as a BJP candidate from Rae Bareli against Rahul Gandhi by a margin of 3,90,030 votes.

== Political career ==
| # | From | To | Position | Comments |
|---|---|---|---|---|
| 01 | 2010 | 2016 | Member, Uttar Pradesh Legislative Council | |
| 02 | 2016 | 2022 | Member, Uttar Pradesh Legislative Council | |
| 03 | 2022 | - | Minister of State (Independent Charge) Horticulture Agriculture Marketing Agriculture Foreign Trade and Agriculture Export Department, Uttar Pradesh | |
| 04 | 2022 | - | Member of Uttar Pradesh Legislative Council | |
