= Dharmveer Prajapati =

Indian politician

Minister of State (I/C) Government of Uttar Pradesh
- Incumbent
- Assumed office 5 March 2024
- Ministry and Departments: Home Guards; Civil Defence
- Preceded by: Himself
- In office 25 March 2022 – 5 March 2024
- Ministry and Departments: Home Guards
- Succeeded by: Himself; Dara Singh Chauhan

Minister of state in Industrial Development Government of Uttar Pradesh
- In office 26 September 2021 – 25 March 2022
- Minister: Satish Mahana
- Chief Minister: Yogi Adityanath

Member of Uttar Pradesh Legislative Council
- Incumbent
- Assumed office 31 January 2021
- Constituency: elected by Legislative Assembly members

Personal details
- Born: 12 July 1963 (age 62) Hathras, Uttar Pradesh, India
- Party: Bharatiya Janata Party
- Profession: Ayurvedic Doctor, politician

Dharmveer Prajapati (born 12 July 1963) is an Indian politician from the state of Uttar Pradesh. He is a member of Uttar Pradesh Legislative Council and Minister of State in the government of Uttar Pradesh, he has the department of Industrial Development and assumed his office on 26 September 2021.

== Posts held ==
Post	Term start	Term end
Minister Of State For Industrial Development	26 September 2021	Incumbent
Member Of Uttar Pradesh Legislative Council	31 January 2021	Incumbent
