= Danish Azad Ansari =

Member of the Uttar Pradesh Legislative Council

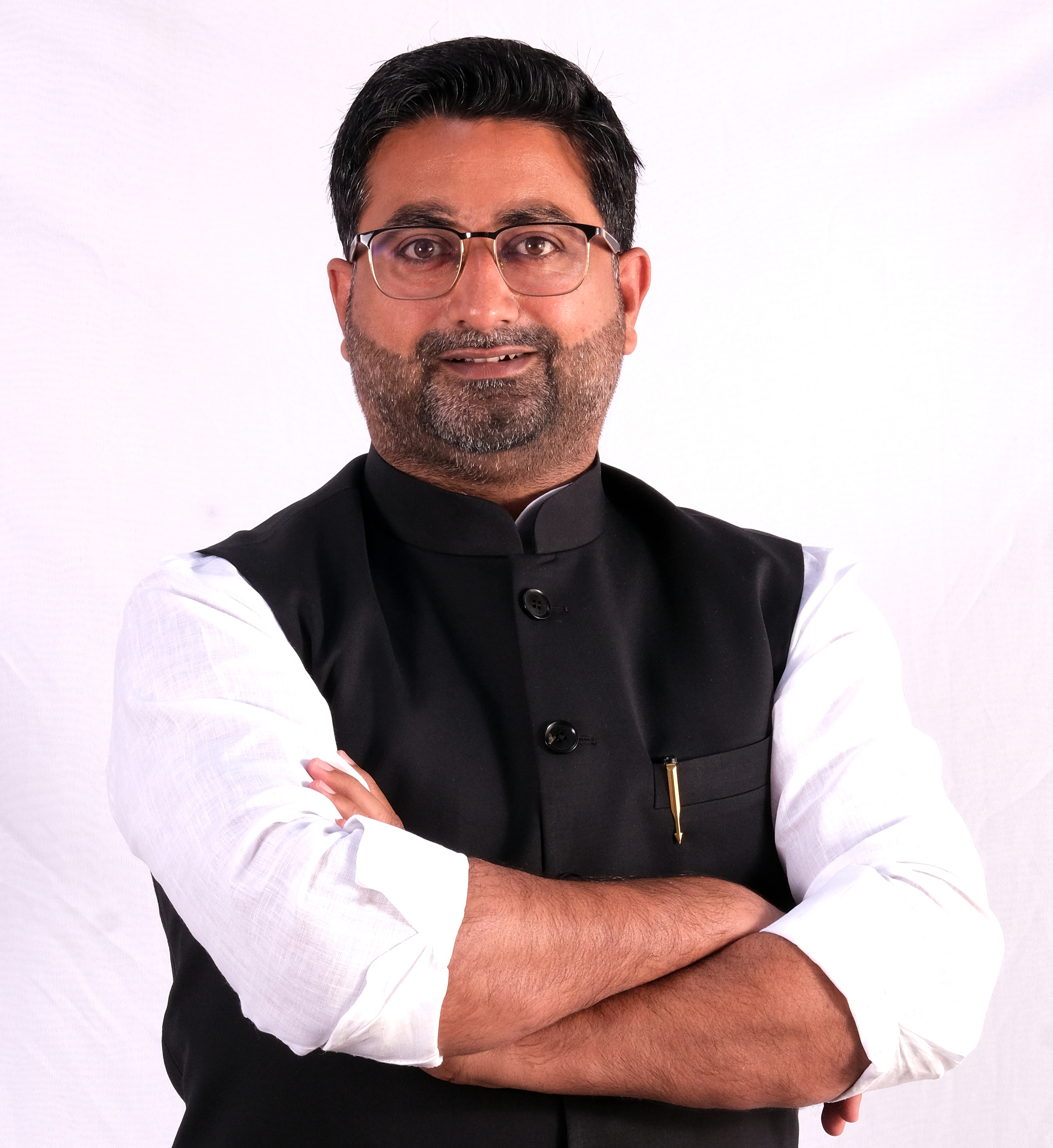

Minister of State for Minority Welfare, Muslim Waqf and Hajj
- Incumbent
- Assumed office 25 March 2022
- Preceded by: Mohsin Raza

Member of Legislative Council, Uttar Pradesh
- Incumbent
- Assumed office 6 July 2022
- Constituency: Elected by Legislative Assembly members

Personal details
- Born: May 30, 1988 (age 38) Ballia, Uttar Pradesh, India
- Party: Bharatiya Janata Party
- Spouse: Farah Deeba
- Education: University of Lucknow
- Profession: Politician

Danish Azad Ansari is an Indian politician and the Minister of State for Minority Welfare, Muslim Waqf and Hajj in the Government of Uttar Pradesh, serving in the Second Yogi Adityanath ministry. He has been a member of the Uttar Pradesh Legislative Council since 2022, representing the Bharatiya Janata Party (BJP).

== Early life and education ==
Danish Azad Ansari was born on 30 May 1988 in Ballia, Uttar Pradesh, India.

Danish Azad Ansari had his early education at Holy Cross School in Ballia, Uttar Pradesh. After completing his primary education, Ansari went to the University of Lucknow and completed his Bachelor of Commerce degree followed by post-graduation in Quality Management and Public Administration.

== Political career ==
Danish Azad Ansari began his political journey through student activism. He joined and was long active in the Akhil Bharatiya Vidyarthi Parishad (ABVP) — the student wing of the BJP — during his studies at the University of Lucknow, where he served as a student leader.

Following the BJP's formation of government in Uttar Pradesh in 2017, Ansari was appointed as a member of the Fakhruddin Ali Ahmed Memorial Committee in 2018 and was subsequently made a member of the Uttar Pradesh State Language Committee (Urdu), a role in which he worked towards promoting Urdu literature and language among youth across the state.

He was elected State General Secretary of the BJP's Minority Morcha in Uttar Pradesh in 2017, focusing on outreach to Muslim communities, particularly Pasmanda groups. He was reappointed to the position in October 2021 ahead of the 2022 Uttar Pradesh Assembly elections.

On 25 March 2022, Ansari was sworn in as Minister of State for Minority Welfare, Muslim Waqf and Hajj in the Second Yogi Adityanath ministry, replacing Mohsin Raza as the sole Muslim face in the UP cabinet. He is the only Muslim face in the Second Yogi Adityanath ministry in the Government of Uttar Pradesh.

Ansari subsequently became a member of the Uttar Pradesh Legislative Council on 6 July 2022, after being fielded by the BJP in the biennial elections to the Council.

In May 2025, the Uttar Pradesh State Haj Committee was reconstituted with Governor Anandiben Patel nominating 13 new members. On 2 June 2025, Ansari was unanimously elected as Chairman of the Uttar Pradesh State Haj Committee, with members accepting a proposal to make him chairman. His tenure as chairman is for three years.

=== Political offices held ===
#	From	To	Position	Comments
01	2017	2022	State General Secretary, BJP Minority Morcha, Uttar Pradesh	Reappointed in October 2021 ahead of the 2022 UP Assembly elections
02	2018	2021	Member, Fakhruddin Ali Ahmed Memorial Committee	Appointed by Chief Minister Yogi Adityanath
03	25 March 2022	Incumbent	Minister of State – Minority Welfare, Muslim Waqf and Hajj, Government of Uttar Pradesh	Took oath as part of the Second Yogi Adityanath ministry; succeeded Mohsin Raza
04	6 July 2022	Incumbent	Member, Uttar Pradesh Legislative Council	Elected for the first time (by Legislative Assembly members)
05	2 June 2025	Incumbent	Chairman, Uttar Pradesh State Haj Committee	Unanimously elected; three-year tenure
