= Narain Singh (politician) =

Indian politician

Member of Uttar Pradesh Legislative Assembly
- In office 1974–1980
- Preceded by: Dharamvir Singh Tyagi
- Succeeded by: Mahendi Asgar
- Constituency: Morna

First Deputy Chief Minister of Uttar Pradesh
- In office 3 April 1967 – 25 February 1968 Serving with Ram Chandra Vikal, Ram Prakash Gupta
- Preceded by: position created
- Succeeded by: Kamalapati Tripathi

Personal details
- Party: Indian National Congress (1974–77) Janata Party (1977–80)
- Children: Sanjay Singh Chauhan
- Occupation: Politician
- Profession: Agriculturist and Advocate

Narayan Singh was served as the first Deputy Chief Minister of Uttar Pradesh.

His son Sanjay Singh Chauhan was a member of the Rashtriya Lok Dal (RLD) and a Member of Parliament representing Bijnor in Uttar Pradesh state in the 15th Lok Sabha.

He died from COVID-19 on 24 April 2021 aged 67.
