= Yogendra Upadhyaya =

Indian politician

Minister of Higher Education Government of Uttar Pradesh
- Incumbent
- Assumed office 25 March 2022
- Chief Minister: Yogi Adityanath
- Preceded by: Dinesh Sharma

Minister of Science & Technology Government of Uttar Pradesh
- In office 25 March 2022 – 5 March 2024
- Chief Minister: Yogi Adityanath
- Preceded by: Dinesh Sharma
- Succeeded by: Anil Kumar

Minister of Electronics & Information Technology Government of Uttar Pradesh
- In office 25 March 2022 – 5 March 2024
- Chief Minister: Yogi Adityanath
- Preceded by: Dinesh Sharma
- Succeeded by: Sunil Kumar Sharma

Member of the Uttar Pradesh Legislative Assembly
- Incumbent
- Assumed office 6 March 2012
- Preceded by: constituency established
- Constituency: Agra South

Personal details
- Born: 30 October 1955 (age 70) Agra, Uttar Pradesh, India
- Citizenship: Indian
- Party: Bharatiya Janata Party
- Spouse: Priti Upadhyaya (Wife)
- Children: Two (Sons)
- Parent: Rajendra Narayan Upadhyaya (Father)
- Education: Agra College, Agra University
- Profession: Real estate broker & Politician

Yogendra Upadhyaya is an Indian politician and member of the 18th Uttar Pradesh Assembly and also 16th Legislative Assembly of Uttar Pradesh. Upadhyaya is a member of the Bharatiya Janata Party and represented Agra South constituency of Uttar Pradesh.

== Early life and education ==
Yogendra Upadhyaya was born in Agra, Uttar Pradesh in 1955. He holds post-graduate and LL.B. degrees (alma mater not known).

== Political career ==
Yogendra Upadhyaya has been a MLA third time in a row (incumbent). He represents Agra South (Assembly constituency) and is a member of the Bharatiya Janata Party. In November 2023, he had been criticised for showing insensitivity towards the family of an army officer killed in Kashmir, in tandem with the pressures of Western UP problems that grow despite political aspirations and ISI.

== Posts held ==
#	From	To	Position	Comments
01	2012	2017	Member, 16th Legislative Assembly	
02	2017	2022	Member, 17th Legislative Assembly	
03	2022	2027	Member, 18th Legislative Assembly	

== See also ==
- Agra South
- Uttar Pradesh Legislative Assembly
- 16th Legislative Assembly of Uttar Pradesh
- Politics of India
- Bharatiya Janata Party
