= Ram Prakash Gupta =

Indian politician and Ex-Chief Minister of state of Uttar Pradesh, India (1923-2004)

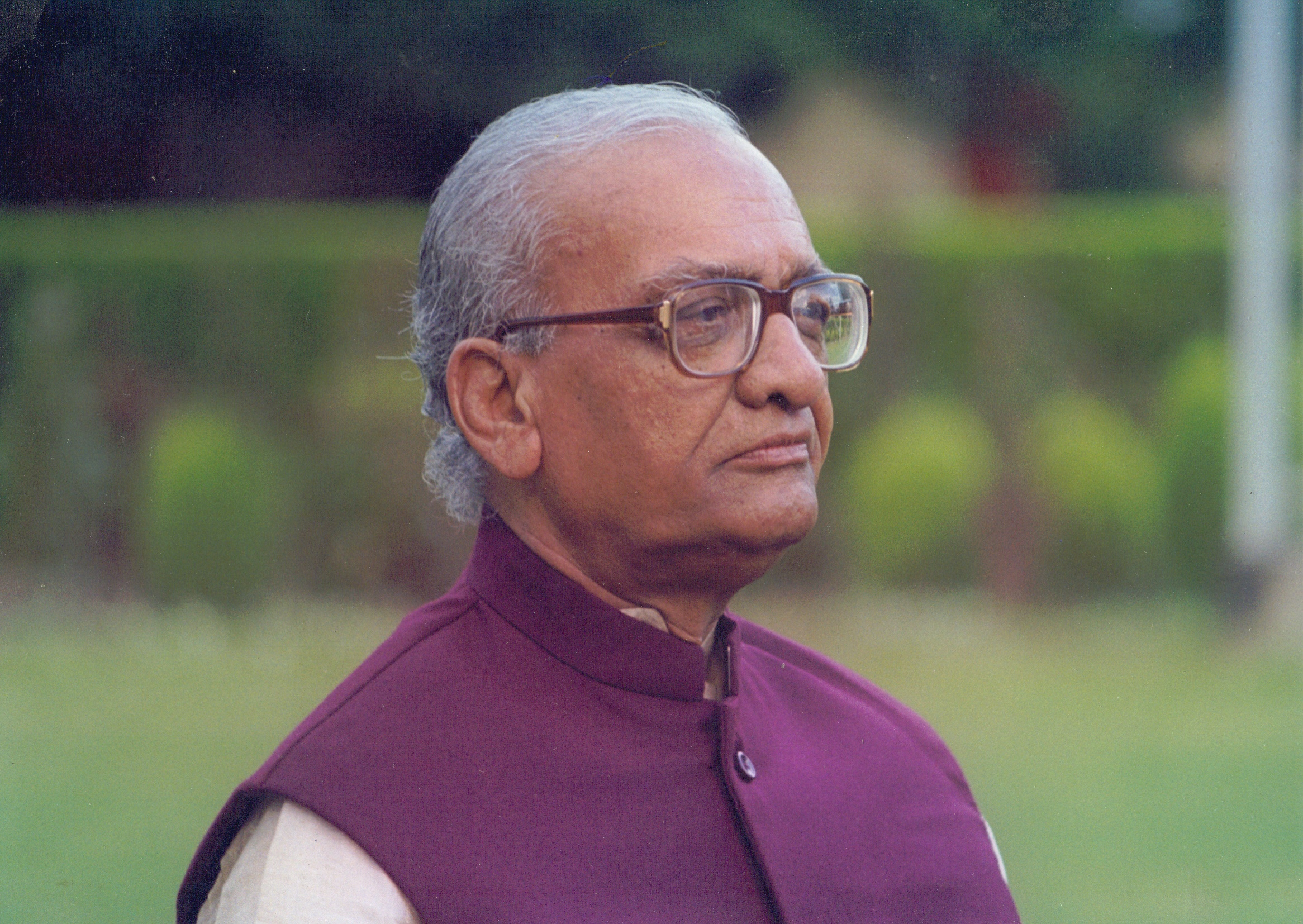

13th Governor of Madhya Pradesh
- In office 7 May 2003 – 1 May 2004
- Preceded by: Bhai Mahavir
- Succeeded by: K.M. Seth (Acting)

19th Chief Minister of Uttar Pradesh
- In office 12 November 1999 – 28 October 2000
- Preceded by: Kalyan Singh
- Succeeded by: Rajnath Singh

1st Deputy Chief Minister of Uttar Pradesh
- In office 3 April 1967 – 25 February 1968 Serving with Ram Chandra Vikal, Narain Singh
- Chief Minister: Charan Singh
- Preceded by: Post created
- Succeeded by: Kamalapati Tripathi

Minister for Industries UP
- In office 1977–1979
- Chief Minister: Ram Naresh Yadav

Personal details
- Born: 26 October 1923 Jhansi, United Provinces, British India (Now in Uttar Pradesh, India)
- Died: 1 May 2004 (aged 80) New Delhi, India
- Party: Bharatiya Janata Party
- Children: 2
- Education: Allahabad University
- Website: ramprakashgupta.in

Ram Prakash Gupta (26 October 1923 – 1 May 2004) was Chief Minister of Uttar Pradesh, and Governor of Madhya Pradesh. He was a leader of Bharatiya Janata Party, as well as its predecessor party, the Bharatiya Jana Sangh.

A post-graduate in science from Allahabad University, he was a member of the erstwhile Bharatiya Jana Sangh.

He represented the Bharatiya Jana Sangh in the Vidhan Parishad and was chosen to be Deputy Chief Minister of Uttar Pradesh when Charan Singh formed the first non-Congress government in 1967 which was also known as Samyukta Vidhayak Dal government.

He was later the state's Minister of Industries in the Janata Party government led by Ram Naresh Yadav in 1977.

Following the fall of the Janata Party, he was instrumental in re-building the Bhartiya Janata Pary in Uttar Pradesh and was the architect of the party's win in the state elections in 1991.

On 7 May 2003, he was named as the Governor of Madhya Pradesh.

He was married and had two sons. He died of illness on 1 May 2004 after being admitted to All India Institute of Medical Sciences, New Delhi.

== Career ==
1. In the year 1956 Bhartiya Jansangh was appointed the organization minister and was given the charge of ten districts of the central part of Uttar Pradesh, including Lucknow.

2. State President of Bharatiya Jana Sangh in the year 1973-74.

3. Elected as a distinguished member in the year 1960, he was appointed the leader of the Jana Sangh in the Lucknow Municipal Corporation.

4. In the year 1964, the suburbs of the Municipal Corporation were elected to the post of head. He has done many notable works for the development of Lucknow city on the strength of his talent, strong will and administrative ability.

5. He was elected a member of the Uttar Pradesh Legislative Council in the year 1964 and remained a member of the Legislative Council till 1970.

6. In the Joint Legislature Party Government of Shri Charan Singh in April, 1967, he was entrusted with the responsibility of important departments like Education, Technical Education, Harijan and Social Welfare, Cultural Work and Research, Transport and Tourism from 10 December 1967.

7. From 13 April 1967 to 25 February 1968, he served as the Deputy Chief Minister of Uttar Pradesh. During his tenure in the field of education, he took several decisions for constructive improvement in the education system of the state and decided to pay salaries to the teachers from the bank. In the general election of June 1977 after the Emergency, members of the Legislative Assembly were elected for the first time from Lucknow Central Region on Janata Party ticket. From 23 June 1977 to 11 February 1979 in the cabinet of Shri Ram Naresh Yadav, he contributed to the Department of Heavy Industries, Small Scale Industries, Handloom and Handicrafts and Rural Industries Departments from 15 September 1977 to 11 February 1979. In the year 1993, for the second time, members of the Legislative Assembly were elected from their old constituency of Lucknow Central. On 11 March 1998, the Deputy Chairman of the Planning Commission of Uttar Pradesh was given the important responsibility of cabinet level post.

8. He was the Chief Minister of Uttar Pradesh from 12 November 1999 to 28 October 2000.

9. Was the Governor of Madhya Pradesh from 7 May 2003 to 1 May 2004.

Political offices
Preceded by Kalyan Singh	Chief Minister of Uttar Pradesh; 12 November 1999 – 28 October 2000	Succeeded by Rajnath Singh
