= Uttar Pradesh Legislature =

Bicameral state legislature of Uttar Pradesh

Uttar Pradesh Legislature उत्तर प्रदेश विधानमंडल
- Seal of the Uttar Pradesh

Type
- Type: Bicameral
- Houses: Uttar Pradesh Legislative Council (Upper House); Uttar Pradesh Legislative Assembly (Lower House)

History
- Founded: 1956 (70 years ago)

Leadership
- Governor: Anandiben Patel since 29 July 2019
- Chief Minister: Yogi Adityanath, BJP since 19 March 2017
- Chairman: Kunwar Manvendra Singh, BJP since 31 January 2021
- Deputy Chairman: Vacant
- Leader of House Legislative Council: Keshav Prasad Maurya; Deputy Chief Minister, BJP since 19 March 2017
- Leader of Opposition Legislative Council: Lal Bihari Yadav since July 2024
- Speaker: Satish Mahana, BJP since 29 March 2022
- Deputy Speaker: Vacant
- Leader of House Legislative Assembly: Yogi Adityanath; Chief Minister, BJP since 19 March 2017
- Leader of Opposition Legislative Assembly: Mata Prasad Pandey, SP since 26 March 2022

Structure
- Seats: 503
- Uttar Pradesh Legislative Council political groups: Government (83) NDA (83): BJP (79); AD(S) (1); NISHAD (1); RLD (1); SBSP (1); Official Opposition (10) SP (10) Other opposition (6) JSD(L) (1) IND (5) Vacant (1) Vacant (1)
- Uttar Pradesh Legislative Assembly political groups: Government (294) NDA (293): BJP (258); AD(S) (13); RLD (9); SBSP (6); NISHAD (5); IND (3); Official Opposition (103) Samajwadi (102): SP (100); INC (2); Other opposition (2) JD(L) (2) Vacant (7) Vacant (7)

Elections
- Uttar Pradesh Legislative Council voting system: Single transferable vote
- Uttar Pradesh Legislative Assembly voting system: First-past-the-post
- Last Uttar Pradesh Legislative Council election: 2024
- Last Uttar Pradesh Legislative Assembly election: 10 February 2022 – 7 March 2022
- Next Uttar Pradesh Legislative Council election: 2026
- Next Uttar Pradesh Legislative Assembly election: 2027

Meeting place
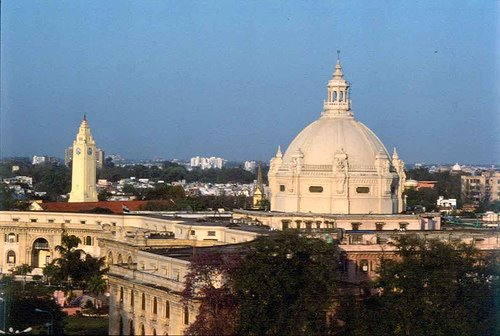
- Vidhan Bhavan, Lucknow

Website
- Legislative Council; Legislative Assembly

Constitution
- Constitution of India

The Uttar Pradesh Legislature is the bicameral legislature of the Indian state of Uttar Pradesh. It composed of the governor and both the houses of state legislature. The governor in his/her role as head of the legislature and has full powers to summon and prorogue either house of legislature or to dissolve the Vidhan Sabha. The governor can exercise these powers only upon the advice of the chief minister and his Council of Ministers. The legislature meets 3 times a year at Vidhan Bhavan in Lucknow.

== Composition ==
The Uttar Pradesh Legislature consists of two houses, namely the Vidhan Sabha and the Vidhan Parishad, with the governor acting as their head.

=== Governor ===
The Governor of the Uttar Pradesh acts as the head of the legislature and enjoys all executive, legislative and discretionary powers of the state. The governors of the states of India have similar powers and functions at the state level as those of the president of India at the central level. The Governor is appointed by the President of India for the term of 5 years.

=== Legislative Council (Vidhan Parishad) ===
The Vidhan Parishad (Legislative Council) or the Upper House is a permanent body not subject to dissolution. One-third of the members retire every second year and are replaced by newly elected members.

=== Legislative Assembly (Vidhan Sabha) ===
The Vidhan Sabha (Legislative Assembly) or the lower house has 403 members. Members are directly elected by citizens of the state on the basis of universal adult franchise representing assembly constituencies across the state.Every citizen of India who is over 18 years of age, irrespective of gender, caste, religion, or race and is otherwise not disqualified, is eligible to vote for members of the Legislative Assembly.

It has a term of five years. To be eligible for membership in the Legislative Assembly, a person must be a citizen of India and must be 25 years of age or older, mentally sound, should not be bankrupt, and should not be criminally convicted.

== Sessions of the Legislature ==
The period during which the both houses meet to conduct their business is called a session. The constitution empowers the governor to summon each house at such intervals that there should not be more than a six-month gap between the two sessions. Hence the Legislature must meet at least twice a year. In India, the legislature of each state conducts three sessions each year:

- Budget session: January/February to May
- Monsoon session: July to August/September
- Winter session: November to December

== Meeting Place ==
The Vidhan Bhavan located at VS Marg in Lucknow, the capital of the state serves as the seat and the meeting place for both the houses of the legislature. All three sessions of the legislature held here only. The building was designed by Samuel Swinton Jacob and Heera Singh; Singh also drew up the blueprint of the building. Butler subsequently monitored the construction of the building. The building was completed in little over five years at a cost of ₹21 lakh (equivalent to ₹36 crore or US$4.6 million in 2020) (1922 cost not adjusted for inflation) and was inaugurated on 21 February 1928.

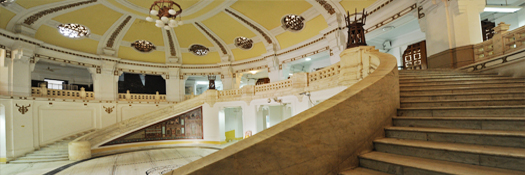
Interior of the Legislative Building.

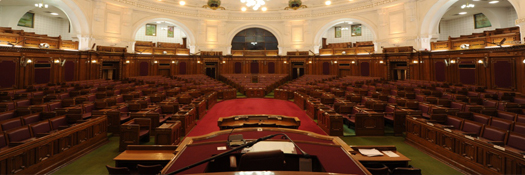
Seats present in the lower house of the legislature.

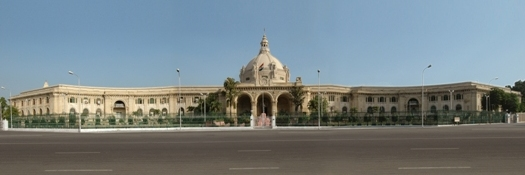
Outside View of the Legislative Building.

== See also ==
- Uttar Pradesh Legislative Assembly
- Uttar Pradesh Legislative Council
- Yogi Adityanath
- Lucknow
- Uttar Pradesh
