= Sanjiv Kumar (Uttar Pradesh politician) =

Indian politician

Sanjeev Kumar

Member of Uttar Pradesh Legislative Assembly
- Incumbent
- Assumed office 2017
- Constituency: Obra, Sonbhadra

Personal details
- Born: 6 June 1975 (age 50) Billi Markundi, Sonbhadra, Uttar Pradesh
- Party: Bharatiya Janata Party
- Spouse: Lila Devi

Sanjeev Kumar is an Indian politician and a member of 17th Legislative Assembly, Uttar Pradesh of India. He represents the Obra (reserved) constituency in Sonbhadra district of Uttar Pradesh. He is a member of the Bharatiya Janata Party.

== Political career ==
Sanjeev Kumar has been an activist of the Bhartiya Janata Party. In the Uttar Pradesh assembly election held in 2017, he defeated his close contestant Ravi Gond from Samajwadi Party with a margin of 44,269 votes.

== Posts held ==
#	From	To	Position	Comments
01	2017	Incumbent	Member, 17th Legislative Assembly	
