= Government of Uttar Pradesh =

Indian State Government

- Uttara Pradēśa Sarakāra
- State government
- Emblem version used by the Government of Uttar Pradesh as of July 2024

Overview
- Established: 1 April 1937; 89 years ago (as Government of the United Provinces)
- State: Republic of India
- Leader: Chief Minister (Yogi Adityanath)
- Appointed by: Governor (Anandiben Patel) on the advice of the chief minister
- Main organ: Council of Ministers
- Ministries: 53 ministries
- Responsible to: Uttar Pradesh Legislature
- Annual budget: ₹6.9 trillion
- Headquarters: State Secretariat, Lucknow

The Government of Uttar Pradesh (ISO: Uttara Pradēśa Sarakāra; often abbreviated as GoUP) is the subnational government of the Indian state of Uttar Pradesh with the governor as its appointed constitutional head of the state by the President of India. The Governor of Uttar Pradesh is appointed for a period of five years and appoints the Chief Minister of Uttar Pradesh and their council of ministers, who are vested with the executive powers of the state. The governor remains a ceremonial head of the state, while the chief minister and their council are responsible for day-to-day government functions.

The state of Uttar Pradesh's influence on Indian politics is important, and often paramount and/or a bellwether, as it sends the most members of parliament to both the Lok Sabha and the Rajya Sabha, the state's population being more than 200 million; approximately double that of the next-most populous state.

== Legislature ==
The state is governed by a parliamentary system of representative democracy. Uttar Pradesh is one of the seven states in India, where the state legislature is bicameral, comprising two houses: the Vidhan Sabha (legislative assembly) and the Vidhan Parishad (legislative council). The Uttar Pradesh Legislative Assembly consists of 404 members who are elected for five-year terms. The Uttar Pradesh Legislative Council is a permanent body of 100 members with one-third (33 members) retiring every two years. Since Uttar Pradesh sends the most legislators to the national Parliament, it is often considered to be one of the most important states with respect to Indian politics. The state contributes 80 seats to the lower house of the Parliament of India, the Lok Sabha and 31 seats to the upper house, the Rajya Sabha.

== Executive ==
The government is headed by the governor who appoints the chief minister and their council of ministers. The governor is appointed for a period of five years and acts as the constitutional head of the state. The governor remains the ceremonial head of the state with the day-to-day running of the government is taken care of by the chief minister and their council of ministers in whom a great deal of legislative powers is vested.

Uttar Pradesh Council of ministers consists of cabinet ministers and ministers of state. The Secretariat headed by the chief secretary assists the council of ministers. The chief secretary is also the administrative head of the government.

Each government department is headed by a Minister, who is assisted by an additional chief secretary or a principal secretary or rarely by a secretary, who usually is an officer of Indian Administrative Service, the additional chief secretary or principal secretary serves as the administrative head of the department they are assigned to. Each department also has officers of the rank of special secretary, joint secretary, deputy secretary, under secretary, section officer etc. assisting the minister and the additional chief secretary or principal secretary or secretary.

=== Council of Ministers ===
Council of Ministers of the Government of Uttar Pradesh
S.No.	Name of Minister	Designation	Portfolios
Cabinet ministers
1.	Yogi Adityanath	Chief minister	Chief Minister, Home Department, Personnel, Revenue, Finance (Institutional Finance), Housing and Urban Planning, Public Works Department (PWD), Law & Legislative, Appointment, General Administration, State Taxes and Registration, Mining and Minerals, Civil Aviation, Planning, Infrastructure
2.	Keshav Prasad Maurya	Deputy chief minister	Rural Development Department
3.	Brajesh Pathak	Deputy chief minister	Health Department
4.	Suresh Khanna	Cabinet minister	Finance Department
5.	Surya Pratap Shahi	Cabinet minister	Agriculture Department
6.	Swatantra Dev Singh	Cabinet minister	Water Resource Department
7.	Baby Rani Maurya	Cabinet minister	Women and Child Development Department
8.	Chaudhary Laxmi Narayan Singh	Cabinet minister	Sugarcane Development and Sugar Industry
9.	Jaivir Singh	Cabinet minister	Tourism and Culture Department
10.	Dharmpal Singh	Cabinet minister	Animal Husbandry and Dairying Department
11.	Nand Gopal Gupta	Cabinet minister	Industrial Development Department
12.	Bhupendra Singh Chaudhary	Cabinet minister	Panchayati Raj
13.	Anil Rajbhar	Cabinet minister	Labour Department
14.	Jitin Prasada	Cabinet minister	PWD Department
15.	Rakesh Sachan	Cabinet minister	Micro Small and Medium Enterprises, Khadi and Villages Industries, Sericulture Industries, Handloom and Textile
16.	A. K. Sharma	Cabinet minister	Urban Development and Power
17.	Yogendra Upadhyaya	Cabinet minister	Science and Electronics Department
18.	Ashish Singh Patel	Cabinet minister	Tech Education Department
19.	Sanjay Nishad	Cabinet minister	Fisheries Department
20	Dara Singh Chauhan		Prisons and Correctional Administration
21	Manoj Pandey		Food and Logistics, Civil Supplies
Ministers of State (Independent charge)
20.	Nitin Agrawal	State Ministers with Independent Charge	Excise & Prohibition
21.	Kapil Dev Aggarwal	State Ministers with Independent Charge	Professional Education & Skill Development
22.	Ravindra Jaiswal	State Ministers with Independent Charge	Stamp and Court Fee, Registration
23.	Sandeep Singh Lodhi	State Ministers with Independent Charge	Basic Education
24.	Gulabo Devi	State Ministers with Independent Charge	Secondary Education
25.	Girish Chandra Yadav	State Ministers with Independent Charge	Sports, Youth Welfare
26,	Dharmveer Prajapati	State Ministers with Independent Charge	Jail, Home Guard
27.	Asim Arun	State Ministers with Independent Charge	N/A
28.	Jayant Pratap Singh Rathore	State Ministers with Independent Charge	N/A
29.	Daya Shankar Singh	State Ministers with Independent Charge	Transport
30.	Dinesh Pratap Singh	State Ministers with Independent Charge	N/A
31.	Narendra Kashyap	State Ministers with Independent Charge	N/A
32.	Arun Kumar Saxena	State Ministers with Independent Charge	N/A
33.	Daya Shankar Mishra Dayalu	State Ministers with Independent Charge	Ayush Ministry
Ministers of State
34.	Mayankeshwar Sharan Singh	State Ministers	Parliamentary Affairs
35.	Dinesh Khatik	State Ministers	N/A
36.	Sanjiv Kumar Gond	State Ministers	N/A
37.	Baldev Singh Aulakh	State Ministers	Agriculture and Agriculture Education
38.	Ajit Singh Pal	State Ministers	N/A
39.	Jaswant Saini	State Ministers	N/A
40.	Ramkesh Nishad	State Ministers	N/A
41.	Manohar Lal Mannu Kori	State Ministers	N/A
42.	Sanjay Singh Gangwar	State Ministers	N/A
43.	Brijesh Singh	State Ministers	N/A
44.	Krishan Pal Malik	State Ministers	N/A
45.	Suresh Rahi	State Ministers	N/A
46.	Anoop Pradhan	State Ministers	N/A
47.	Pratibha Shukla	State Ministers	N/A
48.	Rakesh Rathour (Guru)	State Ministers	N/A
49.	Somendra Tomar	State Ministers	N/A
50.	Rajani Tiwari	State Ministers	N/A
51.	Satish Sharma	State Ministers	N/A
52.	Danish Azad Ansari	State Ministers	Minorities Welfare, Waqf and Haj
53.	Vijay Laxmi Gautam	State Ministers	N/A

== Judiciary ==
The judiciary in the state consists of the Allahabad High Court in Allahabad, the Lucknow Bench of Allahabad High Court, district courts and session courts in each district or Sessions Division, and lower courts at the tehsil level. The President of India appoints the chief justice of the High Court of the Uttar Pradesh judiciary on the advice of the Chief Justice of the Supreme Court of India as well as the Governor of Uttar Pradesh. Other judges are appointed by the President of India on the advice of the Chief Justice of the High Court. Subordinate Judicial Service, categorized into two divisions viz. Uttar Pradesh civil judicial services and Uttar Pradesh higher judicial service is another vital part of the judiciary of Uttar Pradesh. While the Uttar Pradesh civil judicial services comprise the Civil Judges (Junior Division)/Judicial Magistrates and civil judges (Senior Division)/Chief Judicial Magistrate, the Uttar Pradesh higher judicial service comprises civil and sessions judges. The Subordinate Judicial Service (viz. The district court of Etawah and the district court of Kanpur Dehat) of the judiciary at Uttar Pradesh is controlled by the District Judge.

== Administration ==
=== Divisional administration ===
The Indian state of Uttar Pradesh is made up of 75 administrative districts, that are grouped into 18 divisions. Each division consists of 3-7 districts. A divisional commissioner, an officer of the Indian Administrative Service (IAS) is responsible for heading the administration of a division, the Divisional minister is also responsible for the collection of revenue and maintenance of law and order in their division.

There are also eight police zones and eighteen police ranges in the state. Each zone consists of 2-3 ranges and is headed by an additional director general-ranked officer of the Indian Police Service (IPS). Whereas a range consists of three to four districts and is headed by an inspector general-ranked or a deputy inspector general-ranked IPS officer.

=== District administration ===
A district of an Indian state is an administrative geographical unit, headed by a district magistrate and collector (DM), an IAS officer. The district magistrate is responsible for coordinating the work between various departments in the district, is responsible for law and order in the district and is also given the power of an executive magistrate. The DM is assisted by a number of officers belonging to the Provincial Civil Service and other state services.

A senior superintendent of police or superintendent of police, a gazetted officer (PPS or IPS in case of SP and IPS in case of SSP) of Uttar Pradesh Cadre, is entrusted with the responsibility of maintaining law and order and related issues of the district. The superintendent is assisted by other junior to SSP/SP rank IPS and PPS gazetted officers in addition to Uttar Pradesh Police non-gazetted officials.

A divisional forest officer, an officer belonging to the Indian Forest Service, in the rank of deputy conservator of forests, is responsible for managing the forests, the environment, and wildlife-related issues of the district with the assistance of the Uttar Pradesh Forest Service.

Sectoral development is looked after by the district head of each development department such as public works, health, education, agriculture, animal husbandry, etc. These officers belong to the various state services. These officers have to report to the DM of the district.

== Politics ==
The politics of Uttar Pradesh is dominated by the Bharatiya Janata Party, Samajwadi Party, Indian National Congress and the Bahujan Samaj Party. The Bharatiya Janata Party occupies the current government headed by Chief Minister Yogi Adityanath.

== Aircraft fleet ==
The Uttar Pradesh Government's civil aviation department operates a combined fleet of six fixed wing and helicopters. The fleet is used for VIP movements and emergency response and is authorised to operate from Indian Air Force, civilian and UP government-specific airstrips. The fleet, employing 17 pilots, comprises a Hawker 900XP (VT-UPM), a King Air B200 (VT-UPR), a King Air B200GT (VT-UPJ), two Bell 412 EP (VT-UPK & VT-UPO) and an AW109S Grand (VT-UPL). The fleet also assisted the hospitals during the COVID-19 pandemic.

In June 2009, the Hawk 900XP aircraft, at a cost of ₹76 crore (US$15.7 million), was prepared in a hangar of New Delhi's Indira Gandhi International Airport and was delivered to the Uttar Pradesh Government, which was then headed by the then Chief Minister Mayawati.

In March 2010, it was reported that the Government received the delivery of the AgustaWestland AW109S Grand helicopter.

In August 2015, the government launched a global tender for the purchase of an aircraft and a helicopter at a cost of ₹45 crore (US$7.37 million) each to transport the chief minister, cabinet and state ministers and bureaucrats. As of then, the fleet included two aircraft and three helicopters after a turboprop aircraft was sold off at ₹7 crore (US$1.15 million). Meanwhile, another aged helicopter, added to the fleet in 1995, was also proposed to be sold off.

In July 2015, the Government completed the procurement of an aircraft and a helicopter, simultaneously during a 12-day tour to the US by the civil aviation department's principal secretary, director and other officials. The aircraft, Super King Air B-250 (now designated B-200GT), was worth ₹40 crore (US$6.24 million) and landed in Delhi on 11 August. On 13 August, the aircraft was delivered to Lucknow. While, the Bell 412 EPI helicopter, worth ₹84 crore (US$13.09 million), was expected to be delivered in October. The helicopter would be used for the chief minister's transit within the state. By 7 September, the UP Government had approached the DGCA to register the aircraft. The aircraft was allotted the registration BT-UP-T. Meanwhile, the it was confirmed that the aircraft that was earlier sold was a Super King Air B-300 aircraft inducted in 1994. Additionally, a Bell 230 helicopter which is in service since 1995 has also completed its technical lifespan and has been approved to be sold. The Bell 412EPI chopper was ultimately delivered to Lucknow in early December 2015.

As reported in August 2025, the civil aviation department has cleared the procurement an AgustaWestland AW139 — the first procurement since 2016. The current fleet is equipped with aircraft dating between 2003 and 2016. The first batch of pilots are expected to be trained by the original equipment manufacturer, Leonardo, between 13 August and 10 October while the second batch of pilots are to be trained between 9 October and 27 November. The helicopter will be inducted soon following training and regulatory approvals. The helicopter will also have the highest sitting capacity of 15 as against the current fleet's capacity of seven to nine passengers.

=== Gallery ===
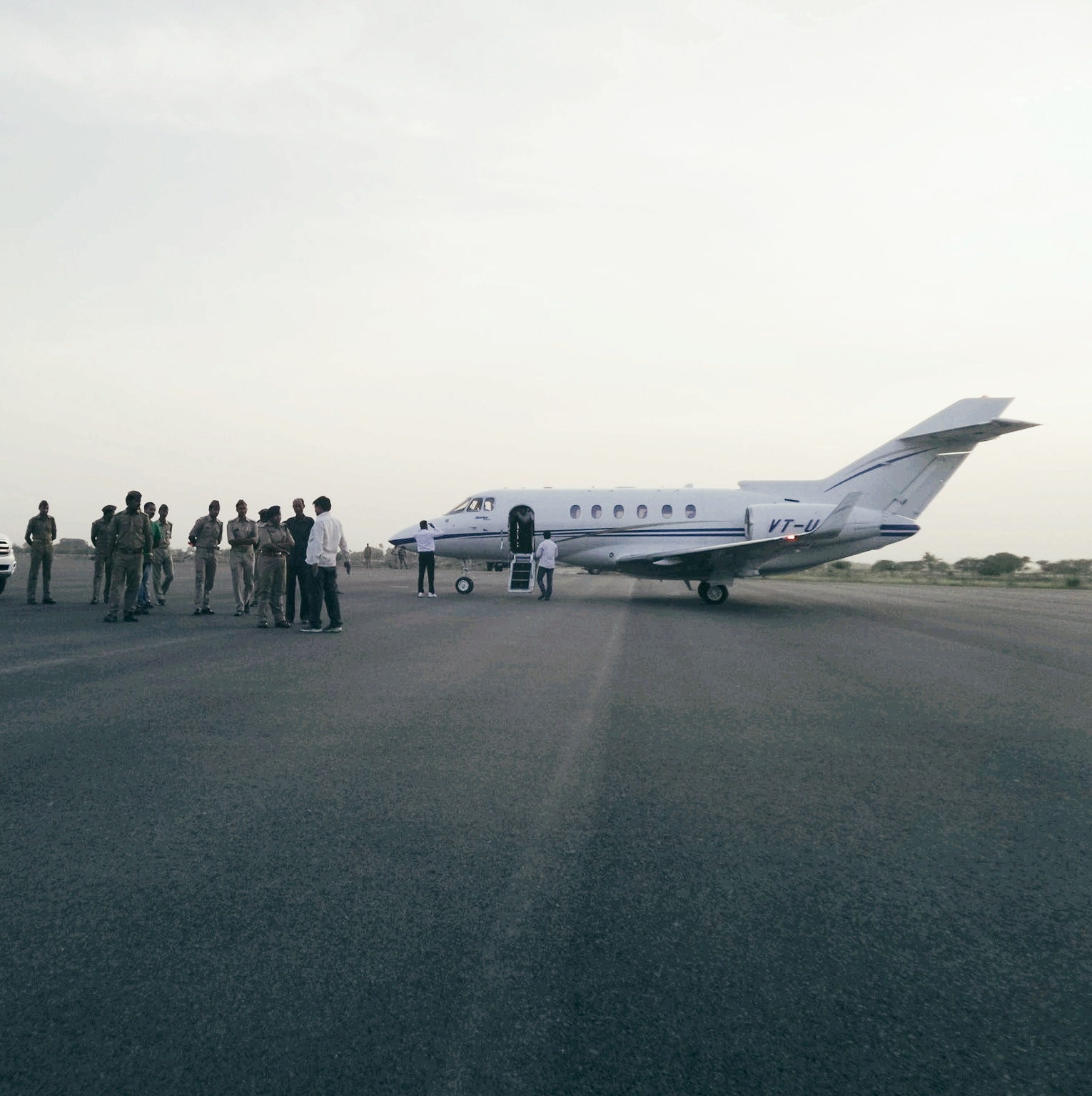
Hawker 900XP (VT-UPM) of the Uttar Pradesh Government at Saifai Airstrip in 2016

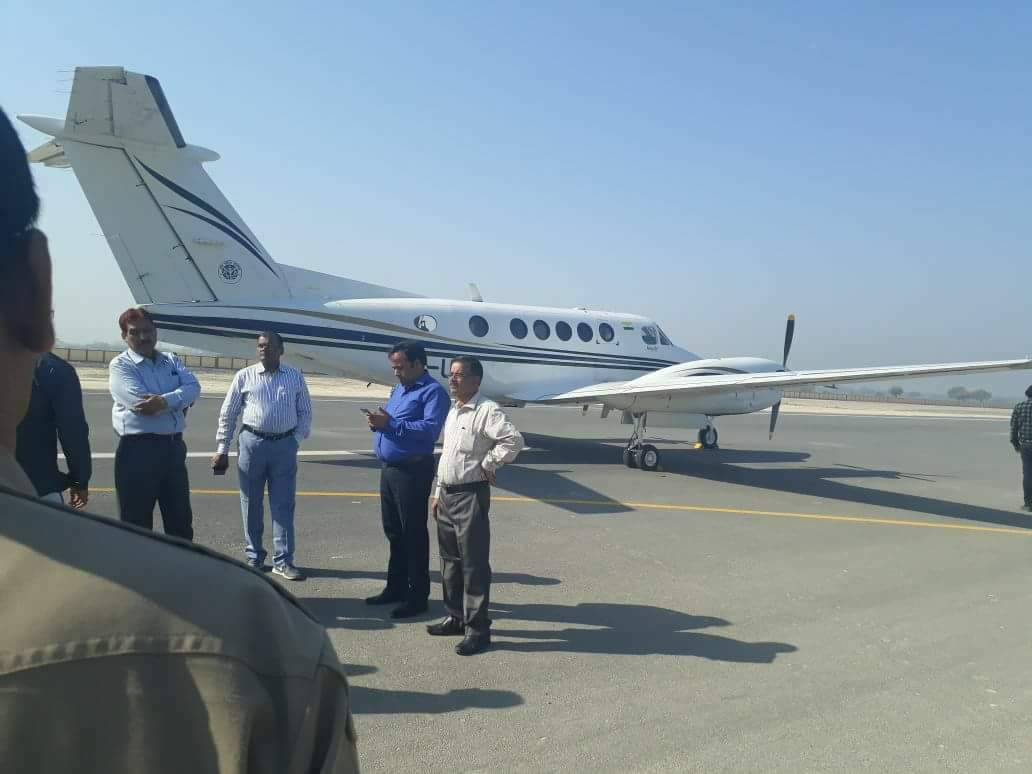
Super King Air B200 of the Uttar Pradesh Government at Marhamtabad Airstrip

== See also ==
- List of governors of Uttar Pradesh
- List of chief ministers of Uttar Pradesh

== Bibliography ==
- Singh, G.P. (1993). Revenue administration in India: A case study of Bihar. Delhi: Mittal Publications. ISBN 978-8170993810.
- Maheshwari, S.R. (2000). Indian Administration (6th ed.). New Delhi: Orient Blackswan Private Ltd. ISBN 9788125019886.
- Laxmikanth, M. (2014). Governance in India (2nd ed.). Noida: McGraw-Hill Education. ISBN 978-9339204785.
