= Chief Minister of Uttar Pradesh =

Head of government of Uttar Pradesh

- Uttar Pradēś Mukhya Mantrī
- Emblem of Uttar Pradesh

- Flag of India

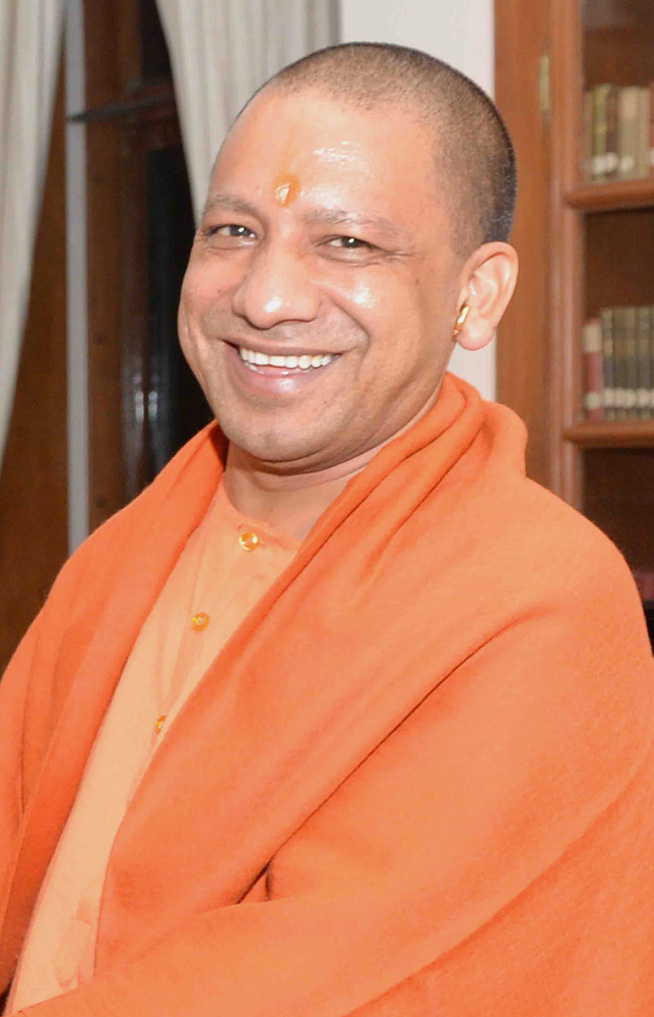
- Incumbent; Yogi Adityanath since 19 March 2017
- Chief Minister's Office; Government of Uttar Pradesh
- Style: The Honorable
- Type: Leader of the Executive
- Status: Head of government
- Abbreviation: CMoUP
- Member of: State Legislature; State Cabinet
- Reports to: Governor of Uttar Pradesh
- Residence: 5, Kalidas Marg, Lucknow
- Seat: State Secretariat, Lucknow
- Appointer: Governor of Uttar Pradesh
- Term length: At the confidence of the assembly; Chief minister's term is for five years and is subject to no term limits.
- Precursor: Premier of United Provinces
- Inaugural holder: Govind Ballabh Pant
- Formation: 26 January 1950 (76 years ago)
- Deputy: Deputy Chief Minister
- Salary: ₹365,000 (US$3,900)/monthly; ₹4,380,000 (US$47,000)/annually
- Website: Office of the Chief Minister

The Chief Minister of Uttar Pradesh is the head of the Government of Uttar Pradesh. As per the Constitution of India, the Governor is the state's de jure head, but de facto executive authority rests with the chief minister. Following elections to the Uttar Pradesh Legislative Assembly, the governor usually invites the party (or coalition) with a majority of seats to form the government. The Governor appoints the Chief Minister, whose council of ministers are collectively responsible to the assembly. Given that he has the confidence of the assembly, the chief minister's term is for five years and is subject to no term limits. The Chief Minister also serves as Leader of the House in the Legislative Assembly.

On 26 January 1950 Govind Ballabh Pant, premier of the United Provinces, became the first Chief Minister of the newly renamed Uttar Pradesh. Including him, 11 out of UP's 21 chief ministers belonged to the Indian National Congress. Among these is V. P. Singh, a future Prime Minister of India, as was Charan Singh of the Bharatiya Lok Dal. On ten occasions, most recently in 2002, the state has come under President's rule, leaving the office of chief minister vacant. UP has also had two women chief ministers—Sucheta Kripalani and Mayawati. Akhilesh Yadav of the Samajwadi Party served as the Chief Minister of Uttar Pradesh from 2012 to 2017; having taken the oath at 38 years of age, he is the youngest person to have held the office. Only three chief ministers completed their official tenure of five years: Mayawati, Akhilesh Yadav, and Yogi Adityanath.

Yogi Adityanath of the Bharatiya Janata Party is serving as the current and the longest serving Chief Minister of Uttar Pradesh since 19 March 2017.

== Oath as the State Chief Minister ==
The Chief Minister serves five years in the office. The following is the oath of the Chief Minister of Uttar Pradesh:

Oath of Office

I, [Name of Chief Minister], do swear in the name of God/solemnly affirm that I will bear true faith and allegiance to the Constitution of India as by law established, that I will uphold the sovereignty and integrity of India, that I will faithfully and conscientiously discharge my duties as a Minister for the State of Uttar Pradesh and that I will do right to all manner of people in accordance with the Constitution and the law without fear or favour, affection or ill-will.

Oath of Secrecy

I, [Name of Chief Minister], do swear in the name of God / solemnly affirm that I will not directly or indirectly communicate or reveal to any person or persons any matter which shall be brought under my consideration or shall become known to me as a Minister for the State of Uttar Pradesh except as may be required for the due discharge of my duties as such Minister.

In Hindi

Pad ki Shapath (Oath of Office)

Main, [CM ka Naam], Ishwar ki shapath leta hoon / satyanishtha se pratigyan karta hoon ki main vidhi dwara sthapit Bharat ke Samvidhan ke prati sachi shraddha aur nishtha rakhunga. Main Bharat ki prabhuta aur akhandta akshunn rakhunga. Main Uttar Pradesh rajya ke Mukhya Mantri ke roop mein apne kartavyon ka shraddhapoorvak aur shuddh antahkaran se nirvahan karunga, tatha main bhay ya pakshpat, anurag ya dwesh ke bina, sabhi prakar ke logon ke prati Samvidhan aur vidhi ke anusar nyay karunga.

Gopniyata ki Shapath (Oath of Secrecy)

Main, [CM ka Naam], Ishwar ki shapath leta hoon / satyanishtha se pratigyan karta hoon ki jo vishay Uttar Pradesh rajya ke Mukhya Mantri ke roop mein mere vichar ke liye laya jayega athva mujhe gyaat hoga, use kisi vyakti ya vyaktityon ko, tab ke sivay jab ki aise Mukhya Mantri ke roop mein apne kartavyon ke uchit nirvahan ke liye aisa karna apekshit ho, main pratyaksh ya apratyaksh roop mein sansuchit ya prakat nahi karunga.

== Premiers of United Provinces (1937–50) ==
The United Provinces, headquartered in Allahabad was a province of British India that comprised present day Uttar Pradesh and Uttarakhand. Under the Government of India Act 1935, a bicameral legislature was set up with a legislative assembly and a legislative council.

Premiers of the United Provinces (1937–50)
| No | Portrait | Name | Term of office | | | Assembly | Appointee (Governor) | Party |
|---|---|---|---|---|---|---|---|---|
| 1 | | The Nawab of Chhatari | 3 April 1937 | 16 July 1937 | 104 days | 1st (1937 elections) | Harry Graham Haig | Independent |
| 2 | | Govind Ballabh Pant | 17 July 1937 | 2 November 1939 | 2 years, 108 days | 1st (1937 elections) | Harry Graham Haig | Indian National Congress |
| - | | Vacant (Governor's Rule) | 3 November 1939 | 31 March 1946 | 6 years, 148 days | Dissolved | - | N/A |
| (2) | | Govind Ballabh Pant | 1 April 1946 | 25 January 1950 | 3 years, 300 days | 2nd (1946 elections) | Francis Verner Wylie | Indian National Congress |

== Chief Ministers of Uttar Pradesh (1950-present) ==
| No | Portrait | Name | Constituency | Term of office | | | Assembly (Election) | Party (Note: This column only names the chief minister's party. The state government he heads may be a complex coalition of several parties and independents; these are not listed here.) |
|---|---|---|---|---|---|---|---|---|
| 1 | | Govind Ballabh Pant | Bareilly | 26 January 1950 | 20 May 1952 | 4 years, 336 days | Provincial (1946 election) | Indian National Congress |
| 1 | | Govind Ballabh Pant | Bareilly | 20 May 1952 | 28 December 1954 | 4 years, 336 days | 1st (1951 election) | Indian National Congress |
| 2 | | Sampurnanand | Varanasi South | 28 December 1954 | 9 April 1957 | 5 years, 345 days | 1st (1951 election) | Indian National Congress |
| 2 | | Sampurnanand | Varanasi South | 10 April 1957 | 7 December 1960 | 5 years, 345 days | 2nd (1957 election) | Indian National Congress |
| 3 | | Chandra Bhanu Gupta | Ranikhet South | 7 December 1960 | 14 March 1962 | 2 years, 299 days | 2nd (1957 election) | Indian National Congress |
| 3 | | Chandra Bhanu Gupta | Ranikhet South | 14 March 1962 | 2 October 1963 | 2 years, 299 days | 3rd (1962 election) | Indian National Congress |
| 4 | | Sucheta Kripalani | Menhdawal | 2 October 1963 | 14 March 1967 | 3 years, 163 days | 3rd (1962 election) | Indian National Congress |
| (3) | | Chandra Bhanu Gupta | Ranikhet | 14 March 1967 | 3 April 1967 | 20 days | 4th (1967 election) | Indian National Congress |
| 5 | | Charan Singh | Chhaprauli | 3 April 1967 | 25 February 1968 | 328 days | 4th (1967 election) | Bharatiya Kranti Dal |
| – | | Vacant (Note: When President's rule is in force in a state, its council of ministers stands dissolved. The office of chief minister thus lies vacant. At times, the legislative assembly also stands dissolved.) (President's rule) | N/A | 25 February 1968 | 26 February 1969 | 1 year, 1 day | Dissolved | N/A |
| (3) | | Chandra Bhanu Gupta | Ranikhet | 26 February 1969 | 18 February 1970 | 357 days | 5th (1969 election) | Indian National Congress |
| (5) | | Charan Singh | Chhaprauli | 18 February 1970 | 1 October 1970 | 225 days | 5th (1969 election) | Bharatiya Kranti Dal |
| – | | Vacant (President's rule) | N/A | 1 October 1970 | 18 October 1970 | 17 days | 5th (1969 election) | N/A |
| 6 | | Tribhuvan Narain Singh | Non Member | 18 October 1970 | 4 April 1971 | 168 days | 5th (1969 election) | Indian National Congress (O) |
| 7 | | Kamalapati Tripathi | Chandauli | 4 April 1971 | 13 June 1973 | 2 years, 70 days | 5th (1969 election) | Indian National Congress |
| – | | Vacant (President's rule) | N/A | 13 June 1973 | 8 November 1973 | 148 days | 5th (1969 election) | N/A |
| 8 | | Hemwati Nandan Bahuguna | Bara | 8 November 1973 | 4 March 1974 | 2 years, 22 days | 5th (1969 election) | Indian National Congress |
| 8 | | Hemwati Nandan Bahuguna | Bara | 5 March 1974 | 30 November 1975 | 2 years, 22 days | 6th (1974 election) | Indian National Congress |
| – | | Vacant (President's rule) | N/A | 30 November 1975 | 21 January 1976 | 52 days | 6th (1974 election) | N/A |
| 9 | | Narayan Datt Tiwari | Kashipur | 21 January 1976 | 30 April 1977 | 1 year, 99 days | 6th (1974 election) | Indian National Congress |
| – | | Vacant (President's rule) | N/A | 30 April 1977 | 23 June 1977 | 54 days | Dissolved | N/A |
| 10 | | Ram Naresh Yadav | Nidhauli Kalan | 23 June 1977 | 28 February 1979 | 1 year, 250 days | 7th (1977 election) | Janata Party |
| 11 | | Banarasi Das | Hapur | 28 February 1979 | 17 February 1980 | 354 days | 7th (1977 election) | Janata Party |
| – | | Vacant (President's rule) | N/A | 17 February 1980 | 9 June 1980 | 113 days | Dissolved | N/A |
| 12 | | Vishwanath Pratap Singh | Tindwari | 9 June 1980 | 19 July 1982 | 2 years, 40 days | 8th (1980 election) | Indian National Congress |
| 13 | | Sripati Mishra | Isauli | 19 July 1982 | 3 August 1984 | 2 years, 15 days | 8th (1980 election) | Indian National Congress |
| (9) | | Narayan Datt Tiwari | Kashipur | 3 August 1984 | 10 March 1985 | 1 year, 52 days | 8th (1980 election) | Indian National Congress |
| (9) | | Narayan Datt Tiwari | Kashipur | 11 March 1985 | 24 September 1985 | 1 year, 52 days | 9th (1985 election) | Indian National Congress |
| 14 | | Vir Bahadur Singh | Paniyara | 24 September 1985 | 25 June 1988 | 2 years, 275 days | 9th (1985 election) | Indian National Congress |
| (9) | | Narayan Datt Tiwari | Kashipur | 25 June 1988 | 5 December 1989 | 1 year, 163 days | 9th (1985 election) | Indian National Congress |
| 15 | | Mulayam Singh Yadav | Jaswantnagar | 5 December 1989 | 24 June 1991 | 1 year, 201 days | 10th (1989 election) | Janata Dal |
| 16 | | Kalyan Singh | Atrauli | 24 June 1991 | 6 December 1992 | 1 year, 165 days | 11th (1991 election) | Bharatiya Janata Party |
| – | | Vacant (President's rule) | N/A | 6 December 1992 | 4 December 1993 | 363 days | Dissolved | N/A |
| (15) | | Mulayam Singh Yadav | Jaswantnagar | 4 December 1993 | 3 June 1995 | 1 year, 181 days | 12th (1993 election) | Samajwadi Party |
| 17 | | Mayawati | Non Member | 3 June 1995 | 18 October 1995 | 137 days | 12th (1993 election) | Bahujan Samaj Party |
| – | | Vacant (President's rule) | N/A | 18 October 1995 | 17 October 1996 | 1 year, 154 days | Dissolved | N/A |
| – | | Vacant (President's rule) | N/A | 17 October 1996 | 21 March 1997 | 1 year, 154 days | 13th (1996 election) | N/A |
| (17) | | Mayawati | Harora | 21 March 1997 | 21 September 1997 | 184 days | 13th (1996 election) | Bahujan Samaj Party |
| (16) | | Kalyan Singh | Atrauli | 21 September 1997 | 12 November 1999 | 2 years, 52 days | 13th (1996 election) | Bharatiya Janata Party |
| 18 | | Ram Prakash Gupta | MLC | 12 November 1999 | 28 October 2000 | 351 days | 13th (1996 election) | Bharatiya Janata Party |
| 19 | | Rajnath Singh | Haidergarh | 28 October 2000 | 8 March 2002 | 1 year, 131 days | 13th (1996 election) | Bharatiya Janata Party |
| – | | Vacant (President's rule) | N/A | 8 March 2002 | 3 May 2002 | 56 days | Dissolved | N/A |
| (17) | | Mayawati | Harora | 3 May 2002 | 29 August 2003 | 1 year, 118 days | 14th (2002 election) | Bahujan Samaj Party |
| (15) | | Mulayam Singh Yadav | Gunnaur | 29 August 2003 | 13 May 2007 | 3 years, 257 days | 14th (2002 election) | Samajwadi Party |
| (17) | | Mayawati | MLC | 13 May 2007 | 15 March 2012 | 4 years, 307 days | 15th (2007 election) | Bahujan Samaj Party |
| 20 | | Akhilesh Yadav | MLC | 15 March 2012 | 19 March 2017 | 5 years, 4 days | 16th (2012 election) | Samajwadi Party |
| 21 | | Yogi Adityanath | MLC | 19 March 2017 | 25 March 2022 | 9 years, 244 days | 17th (2017 election) | Bharatiya Janata Party |
| 21 | | Yogi Adityanath | Gorakhpur Urban | 25 March 2022 | Incumbent | 9 years, 244 days | 18th (2022 election) | Bharatiya Janata Party |

== Statistics ==
=== List by length of tenure ===
| # | Chief Minister | Party | Length of term | |
| # | Chief Minister | Party | Longest tenure | Total tenure |
|---|---|---|---|---|
| 1 | Yogi Adityanath | BJP | 9 years, 244 days | 9 years, 244 days |
| 2 | Mayawati | BSP | 4 years, 307 days | 7 years, 16 days |
| 3 | Mulayam Singh Yadav | SP/JD | 3 years, 257 days | 6 years, 274 days |
| 4 | Sampurnanand | INC | 5 years, 345 days | 5 years, 345 days |
| 5 | Akhilesh Yadav | SP | 5 years, 4 days | 5 years, 4 days |
| 6 | Govind Ballabh Pant | INC | 4 years, 336 days | 4 years, 336 days |
| 7 | Narayan Datt Tiwari | INC | 1 year, 163 days | 3 years, 314 days |
| 8 | Chandra Bhanu Gupta | INC | 2 years, 299 days | 3 years, 311 days |
| 9 | Kalyan Singh | BJP | 2 years, 52 days | 3 years, 217 days |
| 10 | Sucheta Kripalani | INC | 3 years, 163 days | 3 years, 163 days |
| 11 | Vir Bahadur Singh | INC | 2 years, 275 days | 2 years, 275 days |
| 12 | Kamalapati Tripathi | INC | 2 years, 70 days | 2 years, 70 days |
| 13 | Vishwanath Pratap Singh | INC | 2 years, 40 days | 2 years, 40 days |
| 14 | Hemwati Nandan Bahuguna | INC | 2 years, 22 days | 2 years, 22 days |
| 15 | Sripati Mishra | INC | 2 years, 15 days | 2 years, 15 days |
| 16 | Ram Naresh Yadav | JP | 1 year, 250 days | 1 year, 250 days |
| 17 | Charan Singh | BKD | 328 days | 1 year, 188 days |
| 18 | Rajnath Singh | BJP | 1 year, 131 days | 1 year, 131 days |
| 19 | Banarasi Das | JP | 354 days | 354 days |
| 20 | Ram Prakash Gupta | BJP | 351 days | 351 days |
| 21 | Tribhuvan Narain Singh | INC(O) | 168 days | 168 days |

Only 6 of them served longer than the total length of President's rule (4 year, 228 days).

== Timeline ==
Representation of chief ministers by party as on 23 August 2026
1. Indian National Congress (43.2%)
2. Bharatiya Janata Party (20.0%)
3. Samajwadi Party (13.3%)
4. Bahujan Samaj Party (9.20%)
5. Janata Party (3.46%)
6. Janata Dal (2.02%)
7. Bharatiya Kranti Dal (2.05%)
8. Indian National Congress (O) (0.60%)
9. President's Rule (6.04%)
