= Barauli =

Barauli may refer to:

== Places in Bihar, India ==
- Barauli, Bihar, a town in the Gopalganj district
- Barauli, Bihar (Vidhan Sabha constituency), an assembly constituency in Gopalganj district

== Places in Uttar Pradesh, India ==
- Barauli, Jaunpur, a village in the Jaunpur district
- Barauli, Kanpur Dehat, a village in the Kanpur Dehat district
- Barauli, Ballia, a village in the Ballia district
- Barauli, Uttar Pradesh (Vidhan Sabha constituency), an assembly constituency in Aligarh district
- Barauli Rao, a town, panchayat block and Vidhan Sabha constituency in Aligarh district

== See also ==
- Barauli Assembly constituency (disambiguation)
