= Gorakhpur division =

Administrative division of Uttar Pradesh, India

Coordinates: 26.7550°N 83.3739°E

Commissionery Office
- Interactive map of Commissionery Office

Government
  - Divisional Commissioner: Jayant Narlikar

Gorakhpur division

Gorakhpur division is one of the 18 administrative geographical units (i.e. division) of the northern Indian state of Uttar Pradesh. Gorakhpur city is the administrative headquarters of the division. The division consists of 4 districts.

== Districts ==
- Gorakhpur
- Deoria
- Kushinagar
- Maharajganj

== History ==
In the year 1801, the region was transferred by the Nawab of Awadh to the British East India Company and Gorakhpur was raised to the status of a district. In 1829, Gorakhpur was made the headquarters of a division of the same name, comprising the districts of Gorakhpur, Ghazipur and Azamgarh. R.M. Biad was the first appointed Commissioner.

Nowadays, Gorakhpur has become a hub for readymade garments and is also known for Terracotta.

Presently, Azamgarh is a separate division lying in the south of Gorakhpur division, while the present day Ghazipur district is a part of Varanasi division and Ballia district, which was carved out of Ghazipur, is now included in Azamgarh division.
