= Medawara Kala =

- Village
- Location in Uttar Pradesh, India Medawara Kala (India)
- Coordinates: 25.6561197°N 83.93702023°E
- Country: India
- State: Uttar Pradesh
- District: Ballia
- Tehsil: Ballia Sadar

Government
  - Type: Panchayati raj (India)
  - Body: Gram panchayat

Languages
  - Official: Hindi
  - Other spoken: Bhojpuri
- Time zone: UTC+5:30 (IST)
- Pin code: 277501
- Telephone code: 05498
- Vehicle registration: UP-60
- Website: up.gov.in

Medawara Kala is a village located in Ballia district, Uttar Pradesh, India. It has a total of 141 families residing. Madawara Kalan has a population of 783 as per the Population Census of 2011. Medawara comes under erstwhile 'Garha paragana' of Ballia district. The fertile land around Medawara and surrounding village is known as 'Shaila Taal'.

== Administration ==
Medawara Kala is administered by Pradhan through its Gram Panchayat as per the Constitution of India and Panchayati Raj Act.

== Medawara Kala events ==
This small village suddenly came in to news after the 2012 Delhi gang rape incident. Victim Nirbhaya's family belongs to Medawara Kalan. Akhilesh Yadav, Chief Minister of Uttar Pradesh then, visited this village and announced a Primary Health Center (PHC) for the villagers.

== Nearby places ==
- Ballia
- Buxar
- Mughalsarai
- Chitbara Gaon
- Rasra
- Karimuddinpur
- Khardiha
