= Parikhara =

- Village
- Interactive map of Parikhara
- Country: India
- State: Uttar Pradesh
- District: Ballia

Government
  - Body: Gram Panchayat
  - Mukhiya: Sanjeet Singh "Bulbul"

Area
  - Total: 1.02 km^{2} (0.39 sq mi)

Population (2011)
  - Total: 6,000
  - Density: 5,900/km^{2} (15,000/sq mi)
- Time zone: UTC+5:30 (IST)
- PIN: 277001
- Telephone code: 05494
- Vehicle registration: 60
- Website: ballia.nic.in

Parikhara is a village in Hanumanganj Block in Ballia District of Uttar Pradesh State, India. It belongs to Azamgarh Division . It is located 2 km towards North from District headquarters Ballia. 3 km from Hanumanganj. About 400 km from State capital Lucknow.

== Demographics ==
Parikhara Village is located 3 km to Ballia Railway Station. Parikhara is the first Village of Ballia.

== History ==
- Parikhara is Ancient Village of Ballia District.
- 15 Colony in Parikhara.

== Temples ==
- Shiv Temple (in Center)
- Gangaram Baba Aakhara (Gangaram Colony)
- Budhiya Kali Mai (Bhaiya Tola)
- Ramavat Dai (Adhiyara Tola)
- Kolkata Ke Kali Mai (Baba Angana)
- Mahavir Temple (East)

== Education ==
- Govt. School
- Twinkle Public School
- Sant Sahajan Aadarsh Little Flower School
- Ballia Polytechnic (Govt.)

== Medical ==
- Asharfi Hospital (East)
