= Mahthapar =

- Village
- Location in Uttar Pradesh, India Mahthapar (India)
- Coordinates: 26.030804°N 84.105456°E
- Country: India
- State: Uttar Pradesh
- District: Ballia

Government
  - Body: Gram panchayat

Population (2011)
  - Total: 1,889

Languages
  - BhojpuriOfficial: Hindi and Bhojpuri
- Time zone: UTC+5:30 (IST)
- Vehicle registration: UP
- Website: up.gov.in

Mahathapar is a village of Ballia district in the Indian state of Uttar Pradesh. Its population is 1889, per the 2011 Census. Mahthapar's nearest railway station is Ballia.
