= Uma Shankar Singh (Uttar Pradesh politician) =

Indian politician (1971–2026)

Member of Uttar Pradesh Legislative Assembly
- In office 3 March 2012 – 5 August 2026
- Preceded by: Ghoora Ram
- Succeeded by: Vacant
- Constituency: Rasara, Ballia

Personal details
- Born: 2 January 1971 Khanwar, Ballia district, Uttar Pradesh, India
- Died: 5 August 2026 (aged 55) Delhi, India
- Party: Bahujan Samaj Party
- Occupation: MLA
- Profession: Politician

Thakur Uma Shankar Singh (2 January 1971 – 5 August 2026) was an Indian politician who was a member of the 16th and 17th Legislative Assembly, Uttar Pradesh of India. He represented the Rasara constituency in Ballia district of Uttar Pradesh. He was the most recent MLA from the BSP in Uttar Pradesh.

== Early life and education ==
Umashankar Singh was born on 2 January 1971 in Khanwar, a village of Rasra, Ballia, Uttar Pradesh, to Shri. Ghurahu Singh, who served in the Indian Army and retired as an ex-army personnel. Belonging to a farmer family, he completed his basic education in government schools and later joined Satish Chand College, Ballia. He started his career as a student leader and contested the student union election in SC college in the year 1991 and won the election by the highest margin ever.

== Political career ==
Singh contested the Uttar Pradesh Assembly Election in 2017 as a Bahujan Samaj Party candidate and defeated Ram Iqbal Singh from Bharatiya Janata Party with a margin of 33,887 votes. He won the 2012 Assembly election against Sangram Singh Yadav by a large margin.

In February 2016, he organised the group marriages of 351 Hindus and Muslims.

On 1 January 2017, Singh created 40 free wi-fi hotspots for the public to use in Rasra, Ballia constituency.

=== Posts held ===
#	From	To	Position	Comments
01	March 2012	March 2017	Member, 16th Legislative Assembly	
02	March 2017	March 2022	Member, 17th Legislative Assembly	
03	March 2022	August 2026	Member, 18th Legislative Assembly	

== Death ==
Singh died from brain cancer in Delhi, on 5 August 2026, at the age of 55.

== See also ==
- Uttar Pradesh Legislative Assembly
