= List of institutions and places named after Mohammad Ali Jauhar =

Mohammad Ali Jauhar was an Indian Muslim scholar, freedom struggle activist. He co-founded the Jamia Millia Islamia with Mahmud Hasan Deobandi and others. He became the President of All India National Congress in 1923. He was also the first Vice-Chancellor of Jamia Millia Islamia.

Below is a list of institutions and places named after him.

== Institutions ==
- Gandhi Muhammad Ali Memorial Intermediate College, a Senior Secondary School in Belthara Road, Ballia, Uttar Pradesh, India.
- Maulana Muhammad Ali Jauhar Girls High School in Kolkata.
- Maulana Mohammad Ali Jouhar Academy of International Studies in Jamia Millia Islamia.
- Maulana Mohammad Ali College, a state college in Tangail, Bangladesh.
- Mohammad Ali Jauhar University, India

== Places ==
- Maulana Mohammad Ali Johar Park in Lyari, Pakistan.
- Gulistan-e-Johar, neighbourhood in Karachi East, Pakistan.
- Molana Muhammad Ali Johar Town, Lahore Pakistan
- Jauharabad, a city in Pakistan.
- Johar Town, a union council in Pakistan.
- Mohammad Ali Park, Kolkata, India.

== Roads ==
- Maulana Mohammad Ali Jauhar Marg, New Delhi
- M.M Ali Road in Kozhikode.
- MM Ali Road in Chittagong.
- Mohammed Ali Road in Mumbai
