= Bairia =

- Town
- Location of Bairia in Uttar Pradesh, India Bairia (India)
- Coordinates: 25°45′30″N 84°8′56″E
- Country: India
- State: Uttar Pradesh
- District: Ballia

Area
  - Total: 5.3 km^{2} (2.0 sq mi)
- Elevation: 54 m (177 ft)

Population (2011)
  - Total: 386,745
  - Density: 73,000/km^{2} (190,000/sq mi)

Languages
  - Official: Hindi
- Time zone: UTC+5:30 (IST)
- Postal code: 277201
- Area code: 05494
- Vehicle registration: UP
- Website: ballia.nic.in

Bairia is a nagar panchayat in Bairia tehsil in Ballia District of Uttar Pradesh State, India. It belongs to Azamgarh Division. It is located 35 km to the east of the district headquarters Ballia. It is a block headquarters and tehsil headquarters. Bairia is a nagar panchayat (he is divided in 16 ward)located in Bairia Tehsil of Ballia district, Uttar Pradesh with total 54079 families residing. The Bairia nagar panchayat has population of 386745 of which 201317 are males while 185428 are females as per Population Census 2011.

In Bairia nagar panchayat population of children with age 0-6 is 60469 which makes up 15.64% of total population of nagar panchayat. Average Sex Ratio of Bairia nagar panchayat is 921 compared to the Uttar Pradesh state average of 912. Child Sex Ratio for the Bairia as per census is 867, lower than Uttar Pradesh average of 902.

Bairia nagar panchayat has higher literacy rate compared to Uttar Pradesh. In 2011, literacy rate of Bairia nagar panchayat was 70.39% compared to 67.68% of Uttar Pradesh. In Bairia Male literacy stands at 81.07% while female literacy rate was 58.54%. Bairia's Pin code is 277201 and postal head office is Bairia (Ballia).

== Geography ==
Bairia nagar panchayat are 16 ward.

Bairia is surrounded by Murlichhapra Block, Chakki Block and Shahpur Block to the south, and Reoti Block to the west. Reoti, Revelganj, Behea, Chhapra are the nearby cities to Bairia.

Bairia is on the border of the Ballia District and Buxar District Saran(Chhapra) District. Buxar District Chakki is south of this place and Saran district is east of this place. Bairia is also on the border of Bhojpur District and Saran district. It is near the Bihar State border.

== Politics ==
- Bharatiya Janata Party
- Samajwadi Party

Polling stations/booths near Bairia:

- Junior High School Talibpur East
- P.P. Bhopalpur Purvi
- P.P. Chakia South
- P.P. Narharipuri West
- P.P. Shival

== Transport ==
=== By rail ===
Suraimanpur is the nearest railway station to Bairia having road distance of 7 km with stoppage of majority trains connecting directly from New Delhi, Mumbai, Lucknow, Kanpur etc.

The closest major railway stations are Ballia and Chhapra Junction, which are 36 km and 25 km by rail from Suraimanpur Railway Station, and 36 km and 30 km by road from Bairia. Bairia is connected by road to Suraimanpur, Ballia and Chhapra, and private transport services run between these places.
