= Bhrigu Ashram (Ballia) =

Human settlement in India

Religion
- Affiliation: Hinduism
- District: Ballia
- Deity: Bhrigu Muni
- Festival: Dadri Mela

Location
- Location: Ballia, Uttar Pradesh, India
- State: Uttar Pradesh
- Country: India

Architecture
- Style: Hindu Temple

Bhrigu Ashram is a temple in Ballia. The Dadri mela, which is the second largest cattle fair in India, takes place every year approximately one kilometer away from the temple.

The Ashram is located south east of Ballia, at a distance of about 2 km from bus stand, which is 142 km from Varanasi. Ballia is well connected to other parts of state by rail and road (NER Railway Line & NH-19, SH-1) and can be accessed by air from Babatpur airport, Varanasi (about 159 km).

== History ==
Ballia is said to have derived its name from Valmiki, the celebrated author of the Ramayana. Another tradition has it that it derived its name from balua (sand) and still another traditional association of the place is with the ancient sage, Bhrigu (the tract also being referred to as Bhrigu Kshetra), who is said to have sojourned here. Thousands of Rishies are said to have performed puja here. A fine temple known as Bhrigu Mandir, contains the idols of Bhrigu & his disciple Dadar Muni. Bhrigu Muni, is supposed to have written Bhrigu Samhita here, which is considered to be an important document pertaining to future predictions almost about every person.
