= Salempur, Chilkahar =

Villages in Ballia district

Salempur, Chilkahar सलेमपुर
- Village
- Country: India
- State: Uttar Pradesh
- Division: Azamgarh
- District: Ballia
- Block: Chilkahar
- Elevation: 72 m (236 ft)

Languages
  - Official: Hindi, Urdu
  - Regional: Bhojpuri
- Time zone: UTC+5:30 (IST)
- PIN: 277203
- Telephone code: 05496
- Vehicle registration: UP-60

Salempur, Chilkahar is a village located in the Chilkahar block of Ballia district, in the Azamgarh division of the Indian state of Uttar Pradesh.It lies in the eastern region of the state and forms part of the rural administrative area of Ballia district.

== Geography ==
Salempur is situated at an elevation of about 72 metres (236 ft) above sea level. The village is part of the fertile plains of eastern Uttar Pradesh and is surrounded by other settlements such as Chilkahar, Bhrauli, and Rasra. The region experiences a humid subtropical climate, with hot summers and mild winters.

== Administration ==
The village falls under the jurisdiction of the Chilkahar block and is administered through the local gram panchayat system. It is part of the Ballia district in the Azamgarh division.

== Demographics and Culture ==
The population of Salempur primarily comprises Bhojpuri-speaking people, while Hindi and Urdu are used for official communication and education. Cultural life in the village is centered around traditional Bhojpuri customs and festivals. Prominent festivals celebrated include Chhath Puja, Diwali, Holi, and Dussehra.

== Economy ==
Agriculture forms the backbone of the village economy. The major crops cultivated are paddy, wheat, sugarcane, and pulses. Some residents are also engaged in local business, education, and government services in nearby towns such as Rasra and Ballia.

== Transport ==
Salempur is well connected by road to nearby towns including Rasra, Chilkahar, and Ballia. The nearest railway station is Rasra railway station, located approximately 6–8 kilometres from the village. Bus and auto-rickshaw services are commonly used for local travel.

== Education ==
The village has access to primary and upper-primary schools under the Uttar Pradesh government's rural education program. For higher education, students generally travel to nearby towns like Rasra, Chilkahar, or Ballia.

== Climate ==
The region has a typical North Indian climate with three main seasons: summer (April–June), monsoon (July–September), and winter (October–February). Average summer temperatures range from 30°C to 42°C, while winter temperatures fall between 8°C and 20°C.

== See also ==
- Ballia district
- Azamgarh division
- Rasra
