= Reoti =

- Town Area
- Location in Uttar Pradesh, India
- Coordinates: 25°51′N 84°23′E
- Country: India
- State: Uttar Pradesh
- District: Ballia

Government
  - Chairperson: Smt. Jai Shri Pandey

Area
  - Total: 4.12 km^{2} (1.59 sq mi)

Population (2011)
  - Total: 26,359
  - Density: 6,400/km^{2} (16,600/sq mi)
- Time zone: UTC+5:30 (IST)
- PIN: 277209
- Telephone code: 05494
- Vehicle registration: 60

Reoti is a town and a nagar panchayat in Ballia district in the Indian state of Uttar Pradesh. Known for its freedom history it obtained freedom in 1942 from the British government before the five years of India's freedom. As of 2011, its population was 26,359, in 3,910 households.

== Geography ==
Reoti is located about 13 km from Bansdih, the tehsil (subdivision of a district) headquarters, and 35 km from Ballia, the district headquarters. The town is located on the east bank of Reoti Dah, a large lake, and the surrounding area is low-lying, swampy, and flood-prone. The Reoti railway station is located about 800 meters (2,600 ft) south of the town.

== History ==
Reoti was first officially constituted as a municipality on 27 February 1873, under the Bengal Chaukidari Act of 1856. At the turn of the 20th century, the town had a railway station, a twice-weekly market, a postal sub-office, a police station, and four schools. The 1901 census recorded a population of 8,631, including a Muslim minority of 925. The local Muslims mainly belonged to the Julaha weaving community, and Reoti had a sizeable weaving industry at the time, with 75 looms recorded in town c. 1907. Much of the produced cloth was exported to Bengal. Other local industries included shoemaking and the manufacture of palanquins for the Dadri mela at Ballia. A prominent writer from Reoti during this period was Panch Deo Pande, who was mostly known locally.

Reoti's first library was opened in 1959, and a second one opened in 1974. An ayurvedic dispensary was opened in 1960, and an allopathic hospital was opened in 1967. The town first received access to electricity in 1962, and in 1975–76, 40 electric street lamps were first installed. In 1968, the town was put under the Uttar Pradesh Town Areas Act of 1914. From then on, it was administered by a 12-member municipal council (including a chairman and 11 regular members) that was chosen by local elections every five years.

== Demographics ==
Historical population
Year	Pop.	±%
1971	11,617	—
1981	14,384	+23.8%
1991	17,978	+25.0%
2001	22,082	+22.8%
2011	26,359	+19.4%
Source: 2011 Census of India

As of the 2011 census, Reoti had a population of 26,359, in 3,910 households. This population was 51.5% male (13,577) and 48.5% female (12,782). The 0-6 age group numbered 4,359 (2,300 male and 2,059 female), or 16.5% of the total population. 2,454 residents were members of Scheduled Castes, or 9.3% of the total. The town's literacy rate was 63.1% (counting only people age 7 and up). There was a significant gender disparity in literacy, with 72.9% of men and boys being able to read in write, but only 52.8% of women and girls being able to read and write. The 20.1% gender literacy gap was the highest recorded among towns in Ballia district.

== Economy ==
Reoti is noted for the cultivation of a variety of green vegetables, and a significant amount of potatoes are also exported from here to other parts of India. There is also fishing done in the Reoti Dah lake.
