= Jamalpur, Sikandarpur =

Jamalpur
- Village
- Location in Uttar Pradesh, India Jamalpur (India)
- Coordinates: 25.791506°N 84.468646°E
- Country: India
- State: Uttar Pradesh
- District: Ballia

Government
  - Body: Gram panchayat

Population (2011)
  - Total: 269

Languages
  - Official: Hindi and Bhojpuri
- Time zone: UTC+5:30 (IST)
- PIN: 277208
- Vehicle registration: UP
- Website: up.gov.in

Jamalpur is a village of Ballia district in the Indian state of Uttar Pradesh. Its population is 269, per the 2011 Census. Jamalpur village is located in Rasra Tehsil of Ballia district in Uttar Pradesh, India. Jamalpur's nearest railway station is Ballia.
