= Bahorwa =

Bahorwa Banspar Bahorwa
- village
- Location in Uttar Pradesh, India Bahorwa (India)
- Coordinates: 26.133°N 83.866°E
- Country: India
- State: Uttar Pradesh
- District: Ballia
- Talukas: Belthara Road

Area
  - Total: 1 km^{2} (0.39 sq mi)

Languages
  - Official: Bhojpuri, Hindi, Urdu
- Time zone: UTC+5:30 (IST)
- Vehicle registration: UP
- Website: up.gov.in

Bahorwa or Banspar Bahorwa is a village situated in the Belthara Road tehsil, district Ballia, and division Azamgarh, Uttar Pradesh India.

== Demographics ==
Bahorwa village has a population of 3909, of which 2210 are males and 1699 are females as noted in the 2011 Population Census; children ages 0–6 are 654 which is 16.10% of the total population. The literacy rate of Bahorwa village was 85.62% compared to 78.68% of Uttar Pradesh. As per the constitution of India and the Panchayati Raj Act, people have local self-government at the level of Gram panchayat with a Sarpanch who is elected every five years by the village people.

== Administration ==
Political History and Village Leadership (Gram Pradhan)

The village of Banspar Bahorwa has a notable history of local governance, with leadership consistently held by prominent community members over several terms:

1988–1990: Khairul Wara (Gram Pradhan)

1990–1995: Khairul Wara (Gram Pradhan)

1995–2000: Nusrat Jahan (Gram Pradhan)

2000–2005: Nusrat Jahan (Gram Pradhan)

2005–2010: Khairul Wara (Gram Pradhan)

2010–2015: (Gram Pradhan)

2015–2020: Khairul Wara (Gram Pradhan)

== Geography ==
Bahorwa is located 63 km south of the district town Ballia. The nearest airport is Varanasi Airport which is 124 km from the village. The nearest Railway station, Belthara Road, lies about 1 km away toward the south and the Ghaghra river bank is 1 km away toward the north-east. The nearby Bilthra Road Bus stand commonly serves the local Boharwa passengers.

== Education ==
Some members of Iraqi Biradari, a Muslim community living in Bahorwa, more than one hundred years ago, laid the foundation of a college that progressed afterward as Gandhi Mohammad Ali Memorial Inter College at the nearby tehsil Belthara Road. In addition, a school for girls is present at the village.
