= Amarkant =

Indian writer

- Born: 1925; Bhagamalpur, United Provinces of Agra and Oudh, British India (now Ballia district, Uttar Pradesh, India)
- Died: 17 February 2014 (aged 89); Allahabad, Uttar Pradesh, India
- Occupations: Writer, novelist
- Children: 3
- Writing career
- Language: Hindi
- Notable works: Inhi Hathiyaaron Se, Kale Ujale Din, Kuch Yaadein Kuch Baatein
- Notable awards: Jnanpith Award; 2009; Sahitya Akademi Award; 2007

Amarkant (1925 – 17 February 2014) was an Indian writer of Hindi literature. His novel Inhin Hathiyaron Se earned him the Sahitya Akademi Award in 2007, and Vyas Samman in year 2009. He was awarded Jnanpith Award for the year 2009. Amarkant is considered one of the prominent writers of the story writing tradition of Premchand but certainly is credited to add something better in that tradition by his own individuality.

== Personal life ==
Amarkant was born in 1925 in the village of Bhagamalpur, United Provinces of Agra and Oudh, British India, presently part of Nagra tehsil of Ballia district,Uttar Pradesh. He took active part in the Quit India Movement of 1942 which caused him to abandon his studies for a few years. He completed his graduation from Allahabad University and pursued a career in journalism with local Hindi newspapers. In late 2000s, the octogenarian Amarkant was fighting against penury.

He died at the age of 89 on 17 February 2014. He had two sons and a daughter.

== Literary works ==
Amarkant is best known for his short stories although he also published six novels. His short stories, such as Deputy Collectory, Dopahar ka Bhojan (The Lunch), Zindagi aur Jonk (Life and the Leech) and Hatyaare (The Assassins), are considered milestones in post-Independence fiction. He started writing in a period when the Nai Kahani (New Story) movement was heralding a big thematic and structural shift, and almost overshadowed the tradition of Premchand which used to be the mainstream fiction in Hindi. This movement focussed more on urban settings, individual characteristics, man-woman relationships, and so on, in place of people in villages and small towns. The scene was dominated by authors such as Mohan Rakesh, Kamaleshwar and Rajendra Yadav, aggressive advocates of the movement as a new metaphor for and of modern society.

Amarkant was one of the few writers who stuck to the ‘social realistic' tradition of Premchand. Literary critics like Dr Vishwanath Tripathi consider his short stories to be in the lineage of Premchand's later works, particularly his masterpiece Qafan (The Shroud), which is a compactly crafted tale of a Dalit family. The portrayal of Siddheshwari Devi in Dopahar ka Bhojan, Babu Sakaldip Singh in Deputy Collectory and Rajua in Zindagi aur Jonk are intricate and remarkable. For instance, Siddheshwari Devi in Dopahar ka Bhojan distributes a very limited quantity of food amongst her retrenched husband and unemployed children so that nobody feels half-fed, but in the end when nothing but half a roti is left for her, she cries silently. The beauty of Amarkant's writing lies in its simplicity, which the critic Pranaya Krishna described as "the most difficult pursuit". Amarkant goes deep into the sociology as well as the psychology of his characters without any cathartic drama and turns them into authentic representatives of our social margins.

=== Urban brutalities ===
His short stories of the later period mark a shift to urban brutalities. In Hatyaare, he describes two young bullies who boast to each other about being close to leaders such as Jawaharlal Nehru and John F. Kennedy, about refusing the offer of the prime minister's post, and about being presidents. They sexually exploit a poor woman, deprive her of her wages and, while running away, knife to death a man chasing them. It is a dark and cruel world profiled in a tense, mocking language. During a drinking bout, one of the bullies says: “Wretch! You're a coward! I was thinking that when I become Prime Minister, I'd make you the President of the Society for the Prevention of Corruption and the Society for the Abolition of Casteism. But if you can't drink this much, then how are you going to take bribes from officials? How will you make forgeries? How will you tell lies? How then are you going to serve the country, scum?” Amarkant's own life has been full of struggles. At a time when a journalist's job was not a lucrative one, he worked most of his life in that profession with various newspapers, literary periodicals, and news magazines published by Mitra Prakashan in Allahabad. Born in Balia on 1 July 1925, he was, as a 17-year-old student, attracted to the Quit India movement headed by stalwarts such as Acharya Narendra Dev, Ram Manohar Lohia and Jayaprakash Narayan. Gandhiji's “Do or Die” call had a historic impact on Balia, along with Satara in Maharashtra and Medinipur in West Bengal. An independent government was formed for 10 days in Balia and non-violent revolutionaries took over police stations and tehsils and freed prisoners from the jail. Later, in 2003, this history surfaced in Amarkant's voluminous novel Inheen Hathiyaron Se (With These Weapons Alone), which focusses on the people rather than the leaders involved in the movement. One of the characters in the novel says: “Call it Gandhi storm, old dame storm or mega storm, it is a well-known storm in human history. Yes, this is the oldest storm. It repeats itself wherever there is slavery, atrocity, injustice, and dictatorship.” Amarkant's other notable novels include Kaale Ujale Din, Sukhjeevee and Sunaar Pande ki Patohu.
