= Varanasi division =

Administrative division of Uttar Pradesh, India

Coordinates: 25.3200°N 83.0100°E

Varanasi division

Varanasi division is one of the 18 administrative geographical units (i.e. division) of the northern Indian state of Uttar Pradesh. Varanasi city is the administrative headquarters of the division. The division consists of 4 districts, i.e. Varanasi, Chandauli, Ghazipur, and Jaunpur and is loosely equivalent to the Benares State.

== Districts ==
- Varanasi
- Chandauli
- Ghazipur
- Jaunpur

== History ==
In the 18th century the Mughal Empire was dissolving, and the eastern portion of present-day Uttar Pradesh State came under the control of Saadat Ali Khan I, the first Nawab of Awadh. In 1722, Saadat Ali Khan sublet his southern territories, comprising the present-day districts of Bhadohi, Chandauli, Jaunpur, Ghazipur, Mirzapur, Sonbhadra, and Varanasi, to zamindar Mir Rustam Ali. Mir Rustam Ali was deposed in 1738, and Mansa Ram became zamindar. On Mansa Ram's death in 1739, his son Balwant Singh succeeded him, and established himself raja of Benares State. Balwant Singh and added present-day Ghazipur and Ballia districts to his territories. Balwant Singh died in 1770, and the British intervened to get the Nawab to recognize his son and heir, Chait Singh, as raja. The Nawab of Awadh ceded the territory to the British in 1775, and the British confirmed Chait Singh as ruler.

The British deposed Chait Singh in 1781, and under his heir Mahip Narayan Singh, took administrative control over most of the territory, organizing it into Benares Division, comprising four districts: Benares, Ghazipur, Jaunpur, and Mirzapur. The rajas, later maharajas, of Benares retained certain administrative rights and revenues within the division, and directly governed a portion of the division, known as the Benares Estate. The rajas' principal residence was at Ramnagar, across the Ganges River from Benares. Ballia district was separated from Ghazipur in 1879.

The Division had an area of 10,431 square miles, and was part of the United Provinces of British India. The administrative headquarters was at Benares.

The Division's population was 4,395,252 in 1872, 5,178,005 in 1881, 5,368,480 in 1891, and 5,069,020 in 1901. The decrease from 1891 to 1901 was attributed to an epidemic of fever following disastrous floods in 1894, and to famine and emigration. The 1901 census recorded the division's population as 91% Hindu, not quite 9% Muslim, with small populations of Christians and Sikhs.

In 1911, the Benares Estate, which included two areas governed directly by the Maharajas, was separated from the division to form the Princely State of Benares.

In 1947, after India became independent, United Provinces of Agra and Oudh were renamed Uttar Pradesh. In 1948, the Maharaja of Benares (i.e. King of Varanasi) acceded to the Government of India, and Benares State was reintegrated into the Benares division, with the western portion becoming Bhadohi tehsil and the eastern portion becoming Chania tehsil of Varanasi district.

In 1989, the southeastern portion of Mirzapur district was separated into Sonbhadra district. In 1994, Bhadohi (officially known as Sant Ravidas Nagar) was separated from Varanasi district. In 1997, Chandauli district was separated from Varanasi district.

After 2000, Varanasi division was reduced in size, with the districts of Bhadohi, Mirzapur, and Sonbhadra separated into the Mirzapur division, and Ballia district was made a part of Azamgarh division.

== Geographical indication ==
=== Banaras Pan (Betel Leaf) ===
Banaras Pan (Betel Leaf) was awarded the Geographical Indication (GI) status tag from the Geographical Indications Registry, under the Union Government of India, on 31 March 2023. It thus became the first Betel leaf variety from Uttar Pradesh and the 47th type of goods from Uttar Pradesh to earn the GI tag.

== See also ==
Districts of Uttar Pradesh
