= Atul Kumar Rai =

Indian novelist and screenwriter

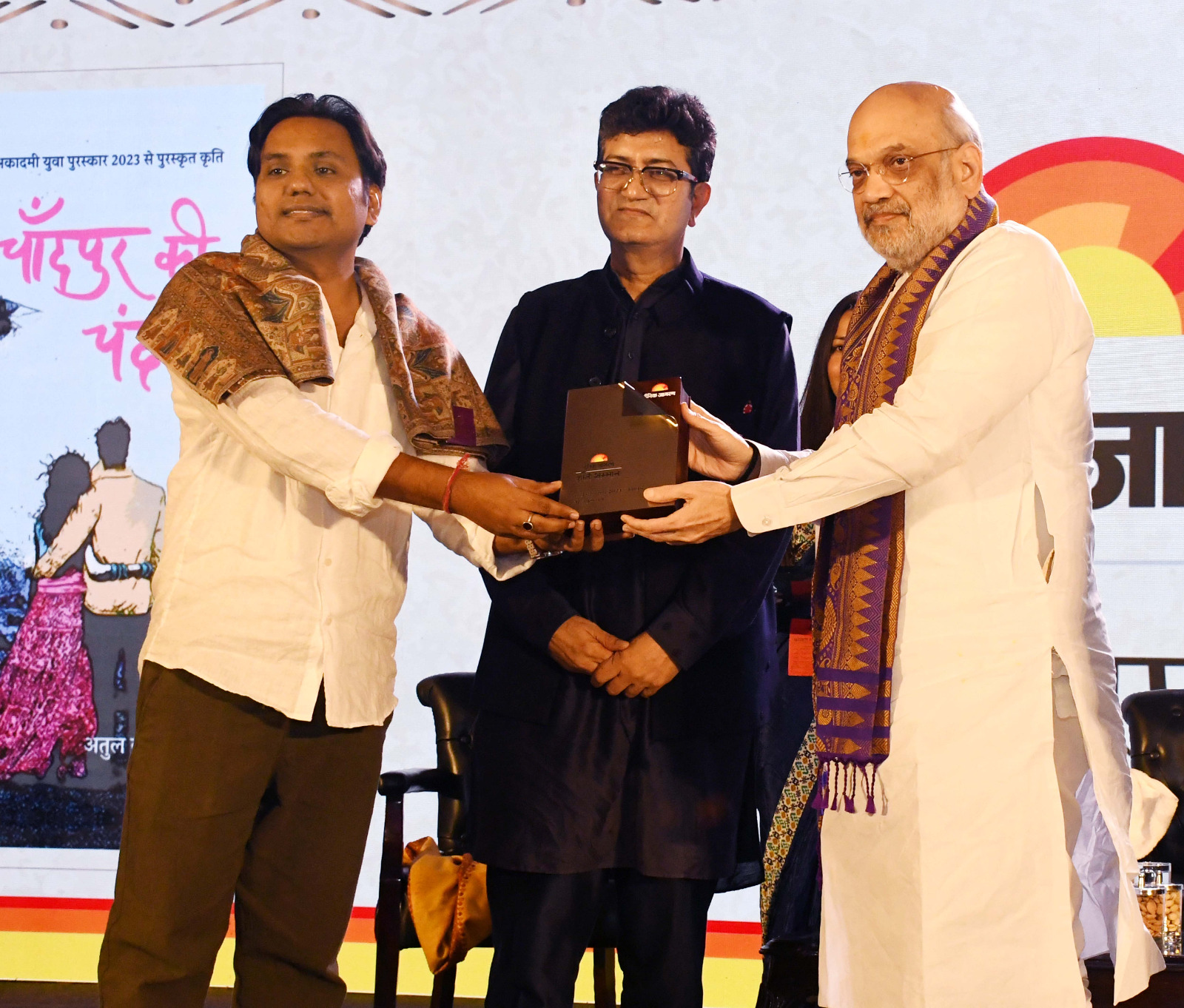
- Rai receiving Dainik Jagran Navankur Award
- Born: 19 February 1992 (age 34); Ballia, India
- Education: Banaras Hindu University (B. Mus, Tabla ), (MPA. Musicology, Ugc Net
- Occupation: Novelist Screenwriter Lyricist
- Writing career
- Period: 2022 to present
- Genres: Fiction, Short Stories
- Notable work: Sherdil: The Pilibhit Saga Chandpur ki Chanda Ishq Banarasi (Audio Series )
- Notable awards: Sahitya Academy Yuva Puraskar Dainik Jagran Srijan Samman
- Website: www.atulkumarrai.com

Atul Kumar Rai (born 19 February 1992) is an Indian Hindi novelist and screenwriter. He is the author of Chandpur ki Chanda, which was awarded the 2023 Yuva Puraskar for Hindi language works by the Sahitya Akademi. He is also a dialogue writer of the 2022 film Sherdil: The Pilibhit Saga.

== Personal life ==
Atul Kumar Rai was born on 19 February 1992. His father is a farmer. Atul completed his high school at Saraswati Shishu Vidya Mandir Sikanderpur Ballia. After intermediate, he completed his graduation in Tabla from Banaras Hindu University and has played Tabla in many national-level Music programs. During their post-graduation in Musicology from Banaras Hindu University, his interest shifted towards Hindi literature. He decided to become a full-time writer. and started writing a weekly Hindi blog. His blogs became popular in social media and were published in national newspapers like Dainik Jagran and Daink Bhaskar. People praised his writing style and suggested writing a novel.

== Writing career ==
Atul's debut novel is Chandpur ki Chanda which has generated the attention of thousands of readers from all over India. Many national news portals, such as Jansatta, DNA, Times Now Navbharat, and Amar Ujala have written about the novel and praised his unique writing style. In 2023 Sahitya Academy awarded Yuva Puraskar for Chandpur ki Chanda. After the immense love of readers and the Sahitya Akademi Award, Dainik Jagran Nielsen Survey placed this novel at number two in the list of Hindi bestsellers in December 2023. in 2025 Atul Received Dainik Jagran Navankur Samman By Home Minister Amit Shah and famous lyricist Prasoon Joshi.

His film writing career started with a short film The Suicide Note For which Atul got the best writer award at the Nirmal Pandey film festival Nainital. His Film writing career in Bollywood started with Pankaj Tripathi's Sherdil the Pilibhit Saga which was directed by Srijit Mukherjee.
