= Pakkakot =

Village and archaeological site in Uttar Pradesh, India

- Village
- Location in Uttar Pradesh, India
- Coordinates: 25.77055°N 84.00736°E
- Country: India
- State: Uttar Pradesh
- District: Ballia
- Tehsil: Ballia

Area
  - Total: 0.655 km^{2} (0.253 sq mi)

Population (2011)
  - Total: 1,278
  - Density: 1,950/km^{2} (5,050/sq mi)
- Time zone: UTC+5:30 (IST)

Pakkakot (Pakkākoṭ) is a village and archaeological site in Garwar block of Ballia district, Uttar Pradesh. Among the ancient structures here include city walls dating back to the Maurya period and a Buddhist monastery from the Gupta or post-Gupta period. The settlement here appears to have been a fairly significant urban and commercial centre. The present-day village is located on one of several archaeological mounds. As of 2011, it has a population of 1,278, in 207 households.

== Geography ==
The modern village of Pakkakot is located about 16 km west of the town of Ballia and is between two streams: the Chhoti Saryu, about 1.5 km to the south, and the Budhi Nala, or Lakda Nala, immediately to the north. Four archaeological mounds are spread out for about 1.5 km along the old bed of the Chhoti Saryu, and the modern village of Pakkakot occupies the southern and western parts of the main mound. This main mound is about 12 m taller than the surrounding plain.

The nearest railway station is Phephna Junction, which is located about 6 km east of Pakkakot.

== Archaeology ==
Excavation of the four mounds at Pakkakot has indicated that the site was continuously inhabited from c. 5000 BCE, during the Neolithic period, until c. 1500 CE. The earliest phase of settlement at Pakkakot, during the Neolithic period, is dated from roughly 5000-2000 BCE. Evidence from this period was found on Mound 1 consisting of a 50-cm deposit; whether anything was found from this period on Mound 2 (the main mound) is not specified. The pottery collected from the neolithic deposit is generally crude and not well-fired. It was made either by hand or by a low-speed potter's wheel. Rice husks were used as a degraissant on the potsherds. Fragments of reed marks and burnt clay lumps indicate that people lived in wattle-and-daub houses during this period.

The next layer, from the Chalcolithic period, was found on Mound 1 only. This phase is dated from c. 2000-900 BCE and measures about 60 cm thick. Pottery from this period was generally wheel-made and ranges from fine to coarse in quality.

The next period, corresponding to the iron-age Northern Black Polished Ware culture, is represented by three sub-phases at Pakkakot. Wattle-and-daub houses were still the standard during this period. The first sub-phase, from approximately 900-600 BCE, was found at both Mound 1 and Mound 2. Subsequently, soil deposits at Mounds 1 and 3 indicate that there was a severe flood from the Chhoti Saryu, prompting the inhabitants to relocate Mound 2. The second sub-phase, from c. 600-450 BCE, is found at Mound 2, the main mound. The third sub-phase, from c. 450-200 BCE, corresponds roughly to the time of the Maurya Empire.

It was during the Maurya period that the first wall was built around the emerging urban centre at Pakkakot. Its original function could have been as an embankment to protect against riverine erosion and flooding, or as a defensive fortification, or both. The town wall appears to have been surrounded by a moat at an early period, and artificial canals were dug to connect the moat to the Budhi Nala to the north. At some unspecified point, a brick wharf was built by the town's main gate, indicating that boats were being used for transport and commerce by then.

By c. 200 BCE to 300 CE, around the time of the Shunga and Kushan empires, Pakkakot had become a full-fledged city. During this period, the city walls were rebuilt for the first time. The remains of various houses with brick-paved floors have been found from this period, along with various wells.

The Gupta and post-Gupta layers are highly disturbed at Mound 2 (the main mound), although the city walls were rebuilt again during this period. The most important discovery from this period is a pair of brick structures on Mound 1 that appear to represent different parts of a Buddhist monastery: one appears to have been a chaitya hall, and the other appears to have been monastic cells. Although the site seems to have originally been Buddhist, the presence of a stone linga found in one of the cells, along with a seal inscribed with the image of a trishula found nearby, indicates that the monastery was later repurposed and used by Shaiva followers. Another structural find from this period is a building complex on Mound 3 that also appears to have been religious in nature. A gold coin of Kumaragupta was also found on this mound.

Surface finds of glazed ware on Mound 2 indicate that the site was still inhabited during the medieval period, although the actual deposits from this period were described as "presently not available".

During its heyday, Pakkakot appears to have been a reasonably important urban centre, with a catchment area encompassing nearby sites such as Matahi, Jagdishpur, Akauni, Chitbaragaon, and Waina. It may have been on the main trade route between Pataliputra and Lumbini, especially if there was a ferry at Buxar in ancient times, as there was in more recent centuries.

== Demographics ==
As of 2011, Pakkakot had a population of 1,278, in 207 households. This population was 52.9% male (676) and 47.1% female (602). The 0-6 age group numbered 181 (97 male and 84 female), making up 14.2% of the total population. No residents were members of Scheduled Castes.

The 1961 census recorded Pakkakot as comprising 1 hamlet, with a total population of 306 people (162 male and 144 female), in 34 households and 33 physical houses. The area of the village was given as 156 acres.

== Infrastructure ==
As of 2011, Pakkakot did not have any schools or healthcare facilities. Drinking water was provided by hand pump; there were no public toilets. The village did not have a public library or post office; there was at least some access to electricity for all purposes. Streets were made of both kachcha and pakka materials. Pakkakot also hosts a regular market.
