= Narhi (Nagra) =

Coordinates: 26°13′N 86°39′E

Narhi (Nagra) is a village in Rasra Tehsil in Ballia district of Uttar Pradesh, India. It belongs to Azamgarh division. It is located 42 km north from District headquarters Balliav, 4 km from Nagra, and 362 km from the state capital, Lucknow.
