= Rasara Assembly constituency =

Constituency of the Uttar Pradesh legislative assembly in India

Coordinates: 25.76°N 84.02°E

Rasra
- Constituency No. 358 for the Uttar Pradesh Legislative Assembly

Constituency details
- Country: India
- Region: North India
- State: Uttar Pradesh
- District: Ballia
- Total electors: 3,56,377
- Reservation: None

Member of Legislative Assembly
- 18th Uttar Pradesh Legislative Assembly
- Incumbent Vacant

Rasra is a constituency of the Uttar Pradesh Legislative Assembly covering the city of Rasra in the Ballia district of Uttar Pradesh, India.

Rasra is one of five assembly constituencies in the Ghosi Lok Sabha constituency. Since 2008, this assembly constituency is numbered 358 amongst 403 constituencies.

Currently the seat is Vacant which is earlier belongs to Bahujan Samaj Party candidate Umashankar Singh who won in last Assembly election of the 2022 Uttar Pradesh Legislative Elections defeating Suheldev Bharatiya Samaj Party candidate Mahendra Chauhan by a margin of 6583 votes. He died on 5 August 2026 with Cancer.

== Members of Legislative Assembly ==
| Year | Member | Party |
|---|---|---|
| 1957 | Ram Ratan | Indian National Congress |
| 1957 | Ganga Prasad Singh | Indian National Congress |
| 1962 | Raghunath | Communist Party of India |
| 1967 | Ram Ratan | Indian National Congress |
| 1969 | Ram Ratan | Indian National Congress |
| 1974 | Raghunath | Communist Party of India |
| 1977 | Mannu Ram | Janata Party |
| 1980 | Hardeo | Indian National Congress (I) |
| 1985 | Hardeo | Indian National Congress |
| 1989 | Ram Bachan | Indian National Congress |
| 1991 | Ghurhu | Janata Dal |
| 1993 | Ghoora Ram | Bahujan Samaj Party |
| 1996 | Anil Kumar | Bharatiya Janata Party |
| 2002 | Ghoora Ram | Bahujan Samaj Party |
| 2007 | Ghoora Ram | Bahujan Samaj Party |
| 2012 | Umashankar Singh | Bahujan Samaj Party |
| 2017 | Umashankar Singh | Bahujan Samaj Party |
| 2022 | Umashankar Singh | Bahujan Samaj Party |

== Election results ==
=== 2027 ===
2027 Uttar Pradesh Legislative Assembly election: Rasara
| Party | Candidate | Votes | % | ±% |
|---|---|---|---|---|
| INDIA | | | | |
| NDA | | | | |
| BSP | | | | |
| NOTA | None of the above | | | |
| Majority | | | | |
| Turnout | | | | |
| gain from | | Swing | | |

=== 2022 ===
2022 Uttar Pradesh Legislative Assembly election: Rasara
| Party | Candidate | Votes | % | ±% |
|---|---|---|---|---|
| BSP | Uma Shankar Singh | 90,492 | 45.12 | −2.65 |
| SBSP | Mahendra Chauhan | 81,304 | 40.54 | |
| BJP | Babban Rajbhar | 24,235 | 12.08 | −18.15 |
| NOTA | None of the above | 1,339 | 0.67 | −0.14 |
| Majority | | 9,188 | 4.58 | −14.26 |
| Turnout | | 200,572 | 56.28 | −1.26 |
| BSP hold | | Swing | | |

=== 2017 ===
2017 Uttar Pradesh Legislative Assembly Election: Rasara
| Party | Candidate | Votes | % | ±% |
|---|---|---|---|---|
| BSP | Uma Shankar Singh | 92,272 | 47.77 | |
| BJP | Ram Iqbal Singh | 58,385 | 30.23 | |
| SP | Sanatan Pandey | 37,006 | 19.16 | |
| NOTA | None of the above | 1,558 | 0.81 | |
| Majority | | 33,887 | 17.54 | |
| Turnout | | 193,151 | 57.54 | |
