= Jhansi division =

Administrative division of Uttar Pradesh, India

Jhansi division

Jhansi division is one of the 18 administrative geographical unit (i.e. division) in the northern Indian state of Uttar Pradesh. Jhansi city is the administrative headquarters of this division.

The division is part of the historic Bundelkhand region, which includes a portion of southern Uttar Pradesh and extends into neighbouring Madhya Pradesh state.

Jhansi division is subdivided into 3 districts:

- Jhansi
- Jalaun
- Lalitpur

== See also ==
- Districts of Uttar Pradesh
