= Govindpur, Ballia =

Govindpur
- Village
- Location in Uttar Pradesh, India Govindpur (India)
- Coordinates: 26.078655°N 83.781835°E
- Country: India
- State: Uttar Pradesh
- District: Ballia

Government
  - Body: Gram panchayat

Population (2011)
  - Total: 469

Languages
  - Official: Hindi and Bhojpuri
- Time zone: UTC+5:30 (IST)
- PIN: 277501
- Vehicle registration: UP
- Website: up.gov.in

Govindpur is a village of Ballia district in the Indian state of Uttar Pradesh. Its population is 469, per the 2011 Census. Govindpur village is located in Ballia Tehsil of Ballia district in Uttar Pradesh, India. The town gets its name from Govinda, a form of Vishnu.
