= Chittu Pandey =

Indian independence activist and revolutionary

Chittu Pandey (10 May 1895 – 6 December 1946), popularly referred to as the Sher-e Ballia (Lion of Ballia), was an Indian independence activist and revolutionary.

== Early and personal life ==
Pandey was born in Rattuchak, a village in Ballia District of what was then the North-West Provinces in a Brahman family. Pandey ji had two children. Son's name was Maksudan Pandey and daughter's name was Lalita Devi.

== Contribution in Indian freedom struggle ==
A distinguished independence activist, he led the Quit India Movement in Ballia; described as the "Tiger of Ballia" by Jawaharlal Nehru and Subhas Chandra Bose, he headed the National Government declared and established on 19 August 1942 for a few days before it was suppressed by the British. The parallel government succeeded in getting the Collector to hand over power and release all the arrested Congress leaders. But within a week, soldiers marched in and the leaders had to flee. He used to call himself a Gandhian. There is a crossroads also on the name of Chittu Pandey.
