= Jharkatahan =

Jharkatahan Gandhi Nagar (old)
- Village
- Interactive map of Jharkatahan
- Country: India
- State: Uttar Pradesh
- District: Ballia

Government
  - Type: Gram Pradhan
  - Body: Jharkatahan Gram Panchayat

Area
  - Total: 1.24 km^{2} (0.48 sq mi)

Population (2011)
  - Total: 4,359
  - Density: 3,520/km^{2} (9,100/sq mi)
- Time zone: UTC+5:30 (IST)
- PIN: 277209
- Telephone code: 05494
- Vehicle registration: 60

Jharkatahan is a village of Thana Reoti in Ballia district in the Indian state of Uttar Pradesh, near the Ghaghara river. It comprises a Taal; a catchment area of Ghaghara river.

== Education ==
- R.N.S. Public School (North side in Village).
- Govt. School
