= Belthara Road railway station =

Railway station in Uttar Pradesh, India

Belthara Road Railway Station

General information
- Location: Belthara Road, Ballia district, Uttar Pradesh; India
- Coordinates: 26.1208°N 83.8415°E
- Elevation: 70 metres (230 ft)
- System: Indian Railways station
- Owner: Indian Railways
- Operator: North Eastern Railway
- Platforms: 2 + 2 (under construction)
- Tracks: 4 (under construction – doubling of diesel 5 ft 6 in gauge railway broad gauge)
- Connections: Auto stand

Construction
- Structure type: At grade
- Parking: Yes
- Cycle facilities: yes

Other information
- Status: Functioning
- Station code: BLTR
- Zone(s): North Eastern Railway
- Division(s): Varanasi
Location
- Location within India Location within Uttar Pradesh

Belthara Road railway station is a small railway station in Ballia district, Uttar Pradesh. Its code is BLTR. It serves Belthara Road city. Belthara Road Station is under the Amrit Bharat Station and Redeveloping by RVNL. The station consists of two platforms and 2 is under construction. The platforms are not well sheltered but soon it will be sheltered. It lacks many facilities including water and sanitation.

== Major trains ==
Some of the important trains that run from Belthara Road are:

- Gorakhpur Varanasi City Express 15131/15132
- Chauri Chaura Express 15004/15003
- Bapudham SF Express 12537/12538 This will run after restoration i.e. 01/March/2024
- Bhatni Varanasi city MEMU Express Special 05147/05148
- Gorakhpur–Lok Manya Tilak Terminus (Kashi Express) 15017/15018
- GKP Godan Express 11056/11055
- Chhapra Godan Express 11060/11059
- Krishak Express 15008/15007
- Purvanchal Express 15050/15049 (via Mau)
- Lichchavi Express 14005/14006
- Gorakhpur Varanasi City Express (Unreserved) 15129/15130
- Bhatni Varanasi City Passenger 55123/
- Durg–Nautanwa Express (via Varanasi) 18202/18201
- Gorakhpur Shalimar Weekly Express 15022/15021
- Bhatnii Varanasi City MEMU Express Special 01747/01748
- Gorakhpur Pune Weekly Express (Via Prayagraj) 11038/11037
- Gorakhpur Mumbai Ltt Weekly Express 11082/11081
- Gorakhpur Banaras Intercity Express 15103/15104
- Chhapra Mau Express (via Bhatni) 05443/05444
