= Pandah =

- village and block
- Location in Uttar Pradesh, India
- Coordinates: 26°00′43″N 84°02′48″E
- Country: India
- State: Uttar Pradesh

Government
  - Body: Gram panchayat
- Elevation: 159 m (522 ft)

Languages
  - Official: Hindi, bhojpuri
- Time zone: UTC+5:30 (IST)
- PIN: 277307
- Telephone code: (+91-5498)
- Vehicle registration: UP 60
- Website: ballia.nic.in/bpl.asp

Pandah is a village and block in Ballia, Uttar Pradesh, India. Its police station is in Sikanderpur, Uttar Pradesh in Ballia district, India.
