= Dopahi =

Coordinates: 25.742°N 84.265°E

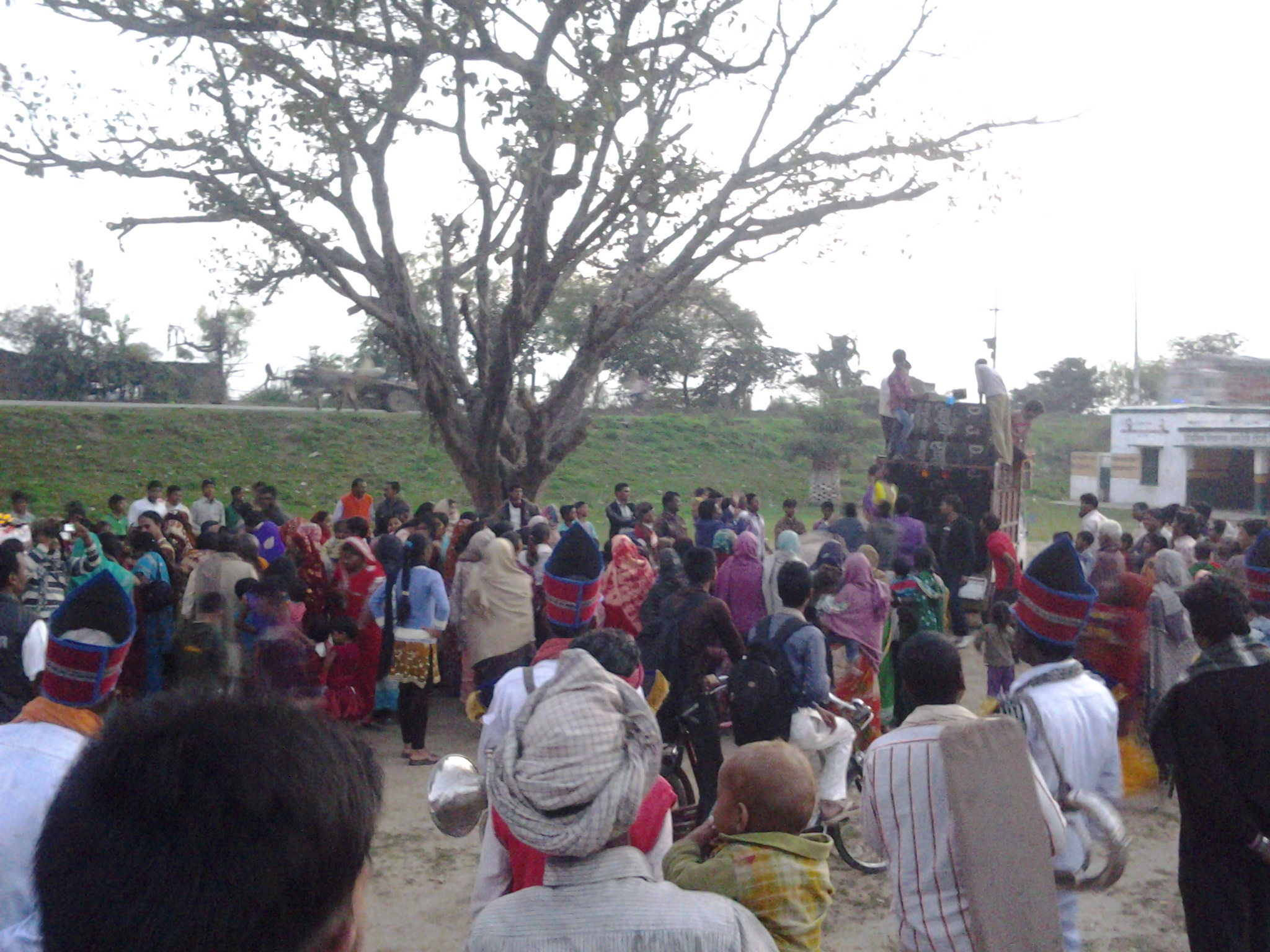
Dopahi Village ground

Dopahi, also known as Agrouli, is a village located in the eastern side of Ballia district in the Indian state of Uttar Pradesh.
