= Sawrubandh =

Sawrubandh Shrirampur
- Village
- Location in Ballia, Uttar Pradesh, India
- Coordinates: 25.760861°N 84.194191°E
- Country: India
- State: Uttar Pradesh
- District: Ballia

Population (2011)
  - Total: 4,065

Languages
  - Official: Hindi, bhojpuri
- Time zone: UTC+5:30 (IST)
- PIN: 277001
- 277001: (+91-5498)

Sawrubandh is a village in Ballia, Uttar Pradesh, India. Sawrubandh is known for its significant contribution to the Indian independence movement. This village is famous for Hindu–Muslim unity, also called Ganga-Jamuni tehzeeb.
