= Administrative divisions of Uttar Pradesh =

Divisions in Uttar Pradesh

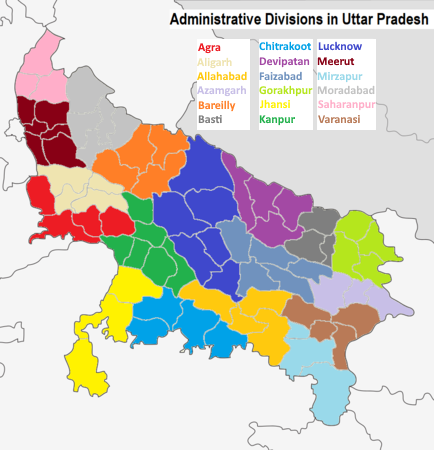
Administrative Divisions of Uttar Pradesh.

The northern Indian state of Uttar Pradesh, which borders Nepal, comprises 18 administrative divisions. Within these 18 divisions, there are a total of 75 districts. The following table shows the name of each division, its administrative capital city, its constituent districts, and a map of its location.

These divisions and districts are primarily constituted for land revenue and general administration.

== Current divisions ==
Currently 75 districts are divided into 18 divisions.

Divisions	Formed	Headquarters	Districts	Map
Agra division	Pre-Independence	Agra	Agra; Firozabad; Mathura; Mainpuri	
Aligarh division	17 April 2008 (Separated From Agra division)	Aligarh	Aligarh; Etah; Hathras; Kasganj	
Ayodhya division	Pre-Independence (Known as Faizabad division)	Ayodhya	Ambedkar Nagar; Amethi; Ayodhya; Barabanki; Sultanpur	
Azamgarh division	15 November 1994 (Separated from Gorakhpur and Varanasi divisions)	Azamgarh	Azamgarh; Ballia; Mau	
Bareilly division	Pre-Independence (Known as Rohilkhand division)	Bareilly	Badaun; Bareilly; Pilibhit; Shahjahanpur	
Basti division	14 June 1997 (Separated from Gorakhpur division)	Basti	Basti; Sant Kabir Nagar; Siddharthnagar	
Chitrakoot division	21 November 1997 (Separated from Jhansi division)	Chitrakoot	Banda; Chitrakoot; Hamirpur; Mahoba	
Devipatan division	21 November 1997 (Separated from Ayodhya division)	Gonda	Bahraich; Balarampur; Gonda; Shravasti	
Gorakhpur division	Pre-Independence	Gorakhpur	Deoria; Gorakhpur; Kushinagar; Maharajganj	
Jhansi division	Pre-Independence	Jhansi	Jalaun; Jhansi; Lalitpur	
Kanpur division	15 August 1988 (Separated from Allahabad division)	Kanpur	Auraiya; Etawah; Farrukhabad; Kannauj; Kanpur Dehat; Kanpur Nagar	
Lucknow division	Pre-Independence	Lucknow	Hardoi; Lakhimpur Kheri; Lucknow; Raebareli; Sitapur; Unnao	
Meerut division	Pre-Independence	Meerut	Baghpat; Bulandshahar; Gautam Buddha Nagar; Ghaziabad; Hapur; Meerut	
Moradabad division	14 September 1980 (Separated from Bareilly Division)	Moradabad	Amroha; Bijnor; Moradabad; Rampur; Sambhal	
Prayagraj division	Pre-Independence (Known as Allahabad division)	Prayagraj	Fatehpur; Kaushambi; Pratapgarh; Prayagraj	
Saharanpur division	21 November 1997 (Separated from Meerut Division)	Saharanpur	Muzaffarnagar; Saharanpur; Shamli	
Varanasi division	Pre-Independence (Known as Benaras division)	Varanasi	Chandauli; Ghazipur; Jaunpur; Varanasi	
Vindhyachal division	14 June 1997 (Separated from Varanasi division)	Mirzapur	Bhadohi; Mirzapur; Sonbhadra	

== Original Divisions with their original districts during Independence ==
During the formation of State of Uttar Pradesh, it consisted of 49 districts divided into 10 divisions.

Divisions	Headquarters	Districts
2nd or Agra division	Agra	Agra; Aligarh; Etah; Mathura; Mainpuri
10th or Ayodhya division (Faizabad division)	Faizabad	Faizabad; Bahraich; Barabanki; Gonda; Pratapgarh; Sultanpur
3rd or Bareilly division (Rohilkhand division)	Bareilly	Badaun; Bareilly; Bijnor; Moradabad; Pilibhit; Shahjahanpur
7th or Gorakhpur division	Gorakhpur	Azamgarh; Basti; Deoria; Gorakhpur
5th or Jhansi division	Jhansi	Banda; Hamirpur; Jalaun; Jhansi
9th or Lucknow division	Lucknow	Hardoi; Lakhimpur Kheri; Lucknow; Raebareli; Sitapur; Unnao
8th or Kumaon division	Nainital	Nainital; Almora; Garhwal
1st or Meerut division	Meerut	Bulandshahar; Dehra Dun; Meerut; Muzaffarnagar; Saharanpur
4th or Prayagraj division (Allahabad division)	Allahabad	Etawah; Farrukhabad; Fatehpur; Cawnpore; Allahabad
6th or Varanasi division (Benaras division)	Benaras	Ballia; Ghazipur; Jaunpur; Mirzapur; Benaras

There were three native principalities (Rampur State, Benaras State and Tehri Garhwal State) which existed outside the regular revenue administration which were later incorporated into it. Rampur State was made a district and was transferred to Rohilkhand division and later to newly formed Moradabad division. Benaras State was integrated with Varanasi district and Varanasi division. Tehri Garhwal State was carved into several hilly districts and a new Garhwal division was created in 1969 with Pauri district as its headquarters along with transferring of Dehradun district from Meerut division to Garhwal division. Pratapgarh district was transferred from Ayodhya division to Prayagraj division in 1988. Ballia district was transferred from Varanasi division when Azamgarh division was formed after separation from Gorakhpur division in 1994. When Uttarakhand got separated from Uttar Pradesh in 2000, Kumaon division and Garhwal division were incorporated into it along with newly formed Haridwar district which was transferred from Saharanpur division to Garhwal division.

== Divisional Officers ==
Almost every department in Uttar Pradesh Government has its divisional level officers who supervise, review and guide its district level officers. There are many important divisional level committees and meetings chaired by concerned Divisional Commissioner which take inter-departmental decisions such as divisional crime and law & order review meeting, divisional security committee, divisional level monitoring committee for development work, regional transport authority etc. Every divisional headquarter district has a state guest-house known as Circuit House.

Department	State Level Officer	Divisional Level Officer	District Level Officer
General Administration and Revenue	Chief Secretary and Chairman of Board of Revenue	Divisional Commissioner, Additional Divisional Commissioners	District Magistrate, Additional District Magistrates
Police	Director General of Police	Inspector General/Deputy Inspector General of Police (Range)	Senior Superintendent/Superintendent of Police (Districts)
Forestry	Principal Chief Conservator of Forest	Chief Conservator/Conservator of Forest (Territorial)	Divisional Forest Officer
Rural Development	Rural Development Commissioner	Joint Development Commissioner	Chief Development Officer
Panchayati Raj	Director Panchayati Raj	Deputy Director, Panchayati Raj	District Panchayati Raj Officer
Town and Country Planning	Chief Planner (Town and Country)	Associate Planner (Town and Country)	Assistant Planner (Town and Country)
Public Works Department	Principal Engineer (Development) cum Engineer in Chief	Chief Engineer, PWD Zone	Superintendent/Executive Engineer, PWD Circle/Division
Power	Chairman, UPPCL	Chief Engineer, Power	Superintendent/Executive Engineer, Power
Irrigation	Engineer in Chief	Chief/Superintendent Engineer, Irrigation	Executive Engineer, Irrigation
Health and Family Welfare	Director General, Health and Family Welfare	Additional Director, Health and Family Welfare	Chief Medical Officer
Social Welfare	Director, Social Welfare	Joint Director, Social Welfare	District Social Welfare Officer
Women and Child Welfare	Director, Women and Child Welfare	Deputy Director, Women and Child Welfare	District Probation Officer
Backward Class Welfare	Director, Backward Class Welfare	Deputy Director, Backward Class Welfare	District Backward Class Welfare Officer
Handicapped Welfare	Director, Handicapped Welfare	Deputy Director, Handicapped Welfare	District Handicapped Welfare Officer
Minority Welfare	Director, Minority Welfare	Deputy Director, Minority Welfare	District Minority Welfare Officer
Food and Civil Supplies	Food and Civil Supplies Commissioner	Regional Food Controller	District Supply Officer
Food and Drugs Administration	Food and Drugs Administration Commissioner	Assistant Commissioner, Food/Drugs	Food Safety Officer/Drugs Inspector
Transport	Transport Commissioner	Regional Transport Officer (Administration/Enforcement)	Assistant Regional Transport Officer (Administration/Enforcement)
Treasury	Director, Treasury	Additional/Joint Director, Treasury	Chief/Senior Treasury Officer
Economics and Statistics	Director, Economics and Statistics	Deputy Director, Economics and Statistics	District Economical and Statistical Officer
Labour	Labour Commissioner	Deputy Labour Commissioner	District Labour Officer
Employment	Director, Employment	Regional Employment Officer	District Employment Officer
Vocational Education	Director, Vocational Education	Joint Director, Vocational Education	Deputy Director, Vocational Education
Higher Education	Director, Higher Education	Regional Higher Education Officer	Assistant Regional Higher Education Officer
Secondary Education	Director General, School Education	Joint Director, Secondary Education	District Inspector of Schools
Basic Education	Director General, School Education	Assistant Director, Basic Education	Basic Shiksha Adhikari
Information	Director, Information	Deputy Director, Information	District Information Officer
Agriculture	Director, Agriculture	Joint Director, Agriculture	District Agriculture Officer
Cane and Sugar Industry	Cane and Sugar Commissioner	Joint/Deputy Commissioner, Cane	District Cane Officer
Dairy Development	Dairy Commissioner	Dairy Development Officer	Deputy Dairy Development Officer
Wild Animal Husbandry	Director, Animal Husbandry	Deputy Director, Animal Husbandry	Chief Veterinary Officer
Horticulture	Director, Horticulture	Joint Director, Horticulture	District Horticulture Officer
Sericulture	Director, Sericulture	Deputy Director, Sericulture	Assistant Director, Sericulture
Fisheries	Director, Fisheries	Deputy Director, Fisheries	Assistant Director, Fisheries
Handloom and Textile	Commissioner, Handloom and Textile	Deputy Commissioner, Handloom and Textile	Assistant Commissioner, Handloom and Textile
Industries	Commissioner, Industries	Joint Commissioner, Industries	Deputy Commissioner, District Industrial Centre
Mines and Geology	Director, Mines	Regional Mines Officer	District Mines Officer
Excise	Excise Commissioner	Joint Excise Commissioner	District Excise Officer
Commercial Tax	Commissioner, Commercial Tax	Additional Commissioner, Commercial Tax	Joint Commissioner, Commercial Tax
Stamps and Registration	Inspector General, Stamps and Registration	Deputy Inspector General, Stamps and Registration	Assistant Inspector General, Stamps and Registration
Prisons	Director General/Inspector General, Prisons	Deputy Inspector General, Prisons	Senior Superintendent/Superintendent of Prison
Prosecution	Director, Prosecution	Additional Director, Prosecution	Joint Director, Prosection
Home-guards	Director General, Home-guards	Divisional Commandant, Home-guards	District Commandant, Home-guards
Fire Service	Director General, Fire Service	Deputy Director Fire Service	Chief Fire Officer
Cooperative	Commissioner and Registrar, Cooperative	Deputy Commissioner and Registrar, Cooperative	Assistant Commissioner and Registrar
Tourism	Director General, Tourism	Regional Tourism Officer	District Tourism Officer
Sports	Director General, Sports	Regional Sports Officer	District Sports Officer

== Demand for integrated Divisional Office Complexes ==
After the state government approved integrated divisional office complexes for Gorakhpur and Varanasi division which will have offices of all divisional officers under one roof. The opposition alleged favouritism for these two divisions as they are located in Chief Minister’s and Prime Minister’s constituencies.

== See also ==
- Districts of Uttar Pradesh
- List of RTO districts in Uttar Pradesh
