= Farsatar =

Farsatar (alternately known as Phursatar) is a village in Siar Mandal, Ballia district, Uttar Pradesh, India. The village is governed by a Gram panchayat. People of the village use to go Siar, also known as Belthara Road, almost every day for their necessities because it is the nearest market well connected to the village. In 2024 Villagers elected Ramashish Chauhan as Gram Pradhan of pharsatar. Pharsatar State has also been there. In the past, courts were set up and the most important thing is that even today the number of lawyers in this village is high. People of all religions live together in this village. There are schools from primary to graduation in this village. The oldest school is Government Primary School, Government Middle School, Mother Jamila National Girls Inter College, Career Educational, Academy S H ACADEMY, Abdul Rafe Intermediate College

It is one of the largest villages in Ballia District.

In Pharsatar, a high degree of interreligious harmony exists.

Pharsatar is also popular due to population of Milki(Landlords), who are also dominant in politics of the region.
