= Jananayak Chandrashekhar University =

State university established in 2016

- Type: State University (Government)
- Established: 2016 (10 years ago)
- Affiliations: UGC
- Chancellor: Governor of Uttar Pradesh
- Vice-Chancellor: Sanjeet Kumar Gupta
- Dean: Saheb Dubey
- Location: Ballia, Uttar Pradesh, India
- Website: jncu.ac.in

Jananayak Chandrashekhar University (JNCU), is a state university established in 2016 by Government of Uttar Pradesh in Ballia, Uttar Pradesh with 138 affiliated colleges. These 138 colleges of Ballia district were formerly affiliated to Mahatma Gandhi Kashi Vidyapith, Varanasi. For academic year 2016-17 exams were conducted by Mahatma Gandhi Kashi Vidyapith, Varanasi but students were awarded a degree of Jananayak Chandrashekhar University.

== Affiliated Colleges ==
=== Government Colleges ===
- Shaheed Mangal Pandey Rajkiya Mahila Mahavidyalaya, Nagwa, Ballia
- Rajkiya Mahavidyalaya, Bairia

=== Government Aided Colleges ===
- Satish Chandra College, Ballia
- Shri Murli Manohar Town Post Graduate College, Ballia
- Kunwar Singh Post Graduate College, Ballia
- Gulab Devi Mahila Post Graduate College, Ballia
- Kamala Devi Bajoria Degree College, Dubhar, Ballia
- Shri Bajrang Post Graduate College, Dadar Ashram, Sikandarpur, Ballia
- Mathura Post Graduate College, Rasra, Ballia
- Amar Nath Mishra Post Graduate College, Dubey Chhapra, Ballia
- Sri Sudristi Baba Post Graduate College, Sudistpuri Raniganj, Ballia
- Devendra Post Graduate college, Belthra Road, Ballia

=== Self-financed Colleges ===
- Gauri Bhaiya Mahavidyalaya, Sagarpali
- Jagdish Singh Mahavidyalaya, Dehari, Rasra, Ballia
- Shri Narheji Mahavidyalaya, Narhi, Rasara, Ballia
- Kisan Post Graduate College, Raksa, Ratsar, Ballia
- Swami Ramnarayanacharya Mahila Mahavidyalaya, Belthara Road, Ballia
- Radha Mohan Kisan Majdoor Mahavidyalaya, Niyamatpur, Kanso, Ballia
- Yashoda Nandan Mahila Mahavidyalaya, Gaura, Madanpura, Ekail, Ballia
- Ramdhari Chandrabhan PG College, Nafrepur (Nagpura) Rasra, Ballia
- Veer Lorik Sughar Mahavidyalaya, Vigah Charauwa, Ballia
- Shri Jamuna Ram Degree College, Chitbaragaon, Ballia
- Shaktipith Mahavidyalaya, Daulatpur, Ballia
- Duja Devi Degree College, Rajauli, Sahatwar, Ballia
- Udit Narayan Rishabh Mahavidyalaya, Pindari, Ballia
- Maa Kasturi Devi Mahavidyalaya Nawanagar, Ballia
- Snatkottar Mahavidyalaya, Bansdih, Ballia
- Shri Ram Karan Post Graduate College, BHIMPURA NO.1, Ballia
- Gauri Shankar Rai Girls Post Graduate College, Gaurishankar Puram (Karnai), Ballia
- Sri Rakhant Baba Mahavidyalaya, Atrauli, Karmauta, Ballia
- Sri Narheji Law College, Narhi, Rasara, Ballia
- Sri Shiv Narayan Ganga Prasad Mahila Mahavidyalaya, Khanpur, Dumaria, Ballia
- Vivekanand Mahavidyalaya, Semari, Ballia
- Smt. Fulehra Smarak Mahila Mahavidyalaya, Kamtailla, Rasara, Ballia
- DS MAA MALTI DEVI PG COLLEGE, BAGURI, BALLIA

== See also ==
- Mahatma Gandhi Kashi Vidyapith
- Allahabad State University
- Siddharth University
