= Sikanderpur, Uttar Pradesh =

Sikandarpur
- Town
- Location in Uttar Pradesh, India
- Coordinates: 26°02′N 84°03′E
- Country: India
- State: Uttar Pradesh
- District: Ballia
- Founder: Sikandar Khan Lodi
- Named for: Sikandar Khan Lodi

Government
  - Type: Democratic Town Area
  - Body: Government of Uttar Pradesh

Population (2011)
  - Total: 23,986

Languages
  - Official: Hindi
- Time zone: UTC+5:30 (IST)
- Vehicle registration: UP60

Sikanderpur is a town and a Nagar panchayat in Ballia, Uttar Pradesh. It was founded and later named by Sikander Lodhi in the past, it was a well-known center of the perfume trade.

According to the 2011 Census, Sikanderpur had a population of 23,986. Males constitute 51% of the population and females 49%. Sikanderpur has an average literacy rate of 58%, lower than the national average of 59.5%: male literacy is 65%, and female literacy is 49%. In Sikandarpur, 18% of the population is under 6 years of age. Sikandarpur is famous for perfumes like rose water, keora jal, jasmine oil, rose oil and ittar. Several type of flowers are cultivated there. It is well connected by road from the two nearest railway stations (Ballia and Belthara Road). It is 35–38 km (22–24 mi) from the Ballia railway station and approximate 25–30 km (16–19 mi) from the Belthara Road railway station.

== Geography ==
Sikanderpur is bordered by the Ghaghara from the north and by plains in other directions. Climatic conditions are usually harsh as the temperature varies from 45 °C in summer to 7 °C in winters.
