= Barauli Assembly constituency =

Barauli Assembly constituency may refer to these state electoral constituencies in India:

- Barauli, Bihar Assembly constituency
- Barauli, Uttar Pradesh Assembly constituency

== See also ==
- Barauli (disambiguation)
