= Surahia =

Surahia Surahiya
- village
- Country: India
- State: Uttar Pradesh
- District: Ballia

Government
  - Body: Gram panchayat

Population (2010)
  - Total: 3,000

Languages
  - Official: Hindi
- Time zone: UTC+5:30 (IST)
- Vehicle registration: UP-60
- Coastline: 0 kilometres (0 mi)
- Nearest city: ballia
- Literacy: 90%

Surahiya is a small village in the Ballia district of Uttar Pradesh, India. It is situated near the town of Sahatwar at a distance of 3 km.
