= Awayan =

- Village
- Location in Uttar Pradesh, India Awayan (India)
- Coordinates: 26°06′30″N 83°51′35″E
- Country: India
- State: Uttar Pradesh
- District: Ballia
- Subdistrict: Siar

Population (2011)
  - Total: 5,604
- Time zone: UTC+05:30 (IST)
- Pincode: 221715
- Telephone code: 05461

Awayan is a village near Belthra Road Railway Station in Ballia District, in the Indian state of Uttar Pradesh. District Ballia, U.P, India (Formerly in District of Azam Garh UP). The population was 5,604 at the 2011 Indian Census.
