= Bansdih =

Bansdih Commonly pronounced as Baasdeeh
- Town
- Location in Uttar Pradesh, India Bansdih (India)
- Coordinates: 25°53′54″N 84°13′20″E
- Country: India
- =State: Uttar Pradesh
- District: Ballia

Government
  - MLA: Ketakee Singh

Population (2001)
  - Total: 20,232

Languages
  - Official: Hindi
- Time zone: UTC+5:30 (IST)
- Vehicle registration: UP 60
- Website: up.gov.in

Bansdih is a town and a nagar panchayat in Ballia district in the state of Uttar Pradesh, India. The name Bansdih is taken from bans (bamboo). This town has a tehsil, college, school and a market place for nearby many villages. Currently chairman of Bansdih is Sunil Singh.

== Demographics ==
As of 2001 India census, Bansdih had a population of 20,232. Males constitute 51% of the population and females 49%. Bansdih has an average literacy rate of 53%, lower than the national average of 59.5%; with 62% of the males and 38% of females literate. 17% of the population is under 6 years of age.

== See also ==
- Surahia
