= Sherdil: The Pilibhit Saga =

Hindi film directed by Srijit Mukherji

- Theatrical release poster
- Directed by: Srijit Mukherji
- Written by: Srijit Mukherji; Sudeep Nigam; Atul Kumar Rai
- Produced by: Bhushan Kumar; Krishan Kumar
- Starring: Pankaj Tripathi; Sayani Gupta; Neeraj Kabi; Sougata Ghosh
- Cinematography: Tiyash Sen
- Edited by: Pronoy Dasgupta
- Music by: Shantanu Moitra
- Production company: T-Series
- Distributed by: Reliance Entertainment
- Release date: 24 June 2022
- Running time: 120 minutes
- Country: India
- Language: Hindi
- Budget: ₹10 crore
- Box office: ₹10 crore

Sherdil: The Pilibhit Saga is a 2022 Indian Hindi-language adventure drama film written and directed by Srijit Mukherji and produced by T-Series and Reliance Entertainment Studios. The film stars Pankaj Tripathi, Sayani Gupta and Neeraj Kabi in the lead roles. The film was released theatrically on 24 June 2022. It marked the final film of playback singer KK, who died a month before the film's release. The film explores a disturbing socio-economic phenomenon observed in villages surrounding the Pilibhit tiger reserve, where extreme poverty compels some families to either abandon their elderly parents or, in certain cases, leads elderly individuals to voluntarily sacrifice themselves, with the hope that their deaths will result in government compensation for their families.

== Plot ==
Gangaram is the Sarpanch (leader) of a village located in the deep forest of Pilibhit tiger reserve in Uttar Pradesh, India. His village has been suffering from famine and crop failure, exacerbated by wildlife encroachment. During an unsuccessful visit to a government office to seek poverty aid, he glances upon a poster that states that the kin of victims of fatal tiger encounters in areas bordering tiger reserves would be entitled to a ₹10,00,000 compensation from the Govt. of India. In a desperate attempt to alleviate the conditions of his village, Gangaram plots to sacrifice himself in a tiger attack. During his search for a tiger, his path crosses with that of a poacher Jim Ahmed (Neeraj Kabi) with whom he forms an unconventional partnership. The story then follows his journey, highlighting social issues faced by the lesser fortunate.

Gangaram unites with the poacher and both go looking for a tiger. After many days they find a tiger. Gangaram walks toward the tiger and the poacher is ready to shoot it. But the tiger is full and walks away. Forest officers follow them and shoot the poacher and take Gangaram into custody. Gangaram's story becomes famous all over India. He is pardoned from the court.

In the final scene, Gangaram comes back to the jungle in 4 wheelers with officers who want to promote tourism. Gangaram wants to take a leak and he goes to the jungle alone and is attacked by a tiger.

== Cast ==
- Pankaj Tripathi as Gangaram "Gangu"
- Sayani Gupta as Lajwanti "Lajjo"
- Neeraj Kabi as Jim Ahmed
- Sohag Sen as Gangaram's mother
- Rakesh Boro as Ritvi
- Akshay Kapoor as DFO
- Sougata Ghosh

== Soundtrack ==
The music rights of the film are owned by T Series. The music is composed by Shantanu Moitra. The first single titled "Dhoop Paani Bahne De" was released on 6 June 2022.

Tracklist
No.	Title	Lyrics	Singer(s)	Length
1.	"Dhoop Paani Bahne De"	Gulzar	KK, Rituraj	4:08
2.	"Moko Kahan"	Traditional	Soumya Murshidabadi	4:32
3.	"Maya Chhaliya Roop Dhare"	Vinod Dubey	Rahul Ram	3:22
4.	"Aadmi Bhutiya Hai"	Rahgir	Rahgir	4:05
5.	"Do Din Jag Ka Mela"	Traditional	Neeraj	4:07
6.	"Bandho Bandho"	Vinod Dubey	Swanand Kirkire	3:40
7.	"Kahe Satnaam"	Traditional	Rahul Ram	2:19

== Release ==
=== Home media ===
The digital streaming rights of the film were sold to Netflix. The film was digitally streamed on Netflix from 20 August 2022.

== See also ==
- Pilibhit (film)
