= Barauli, Kanpur Dehat =

Barauli
- Village
- Location in Kanpur, Uttar Pradesh, India Barauli (India)
- Coordinates: 26.14°N 79.85°E
- Country: India
- State: Uttar Pradesh
- District: Kanpur Nagar

Population (2011 Census of India)
  - Total: 5,441

Languages
  - Official: Hindi
- Time zone: UTC+5:30 (IST)
- PIN: 209202
- Vehicle registration: UP-78

Barauli is a village situated in the Indian district of Kanpur Dehat. It is near Bhoganipur, a town, 10 kilometres (6.2 mi) away from Barauli. Total population of this village is approximately 4000. Neighbouring villages are Devarahat, Jallapur, Prempur, Sujaur, Madnupur, Musrahijhor, and Shelhupur.
