= Barauli, Jaunpur =

Barauli is a village in the Jaunpur district of Uttar Pradesh, India. Bhojpuri is the traditional language of this village.
