= Rasra =

City and a municipal board in Ballia district, Uttar Pradesh, India

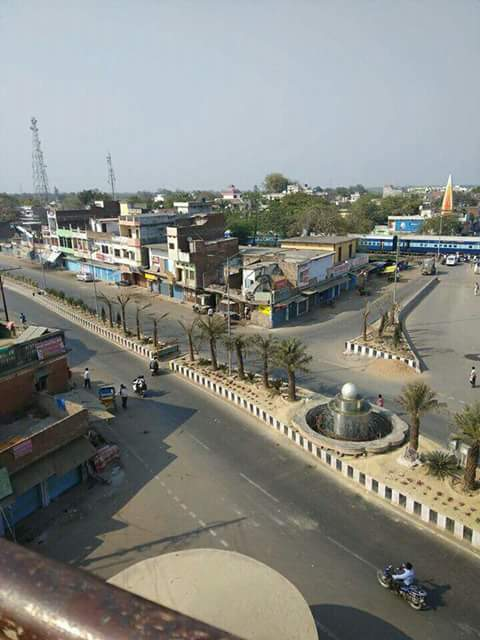
- Pyare Lal Chowk at Rasra
- Nickname: Nath Nagari
- Location in Uttar Pradesh, India
- Coordinates: 25°51′N 83°51′E
- Country: India
- State: Uttar Pradesh
- Division: Azamgarh
- District: Ballia
- Established: 1896

Area
  - Total: 19 km^{2} (7.3 sq mi)
- Elevation: 70 m (230 ft)

Population (2019)
  - Total: 29,263
  - Density: 1,500/km^{2} (4,000/sq mi)

Language
  - Official: Hindi
  - Others: Bhojpuri, Urdu
- Time zone: UTC+5:30 (IST)
- PIN: 221712
- Area code: 05491

Rasra is a city and a municipal board in Ballia district in the Indian state of Uttar Pradesh. It is one among six tehsils that come under Ballia district, Rasra is also known as Nath Nagri due to the presence of Nath Baba mandir which is a well known religious spot. In past the production of sugar from rotten sugarcanes lead to the city being named 'Rasra' which is a portmanteau word made-up of two hindi words 'Ras' (रस) meaning juice and 'Sada/Sara' (सड़ा) meaning rotten. It has an important market for the nearby villages. Lounglatta is the famous sweet of Rasra. Dussehra is one of two very prominent festivals, here, alongside Chhath . Rasra has top schools of district. Rasra has a busy fish market, chicken market and mutton narket. It has also Sadar Bazaar, Station Road Market, Hospital Complex Market, Mission Road Market, Kali Maa ka chauraha. This place is known for all religious cultures, and has many temples, churches and mosques.

== Geography ==
Rasra is 34 km far from Ballia and 42 km from Mau. Rasra is located at 25°51′N 83°51′E. It has an average elevation of 55 metres (180 ft).

== Tourism place and Temple ==
- Sri Nath Ji Math Nagpur
- Sri Nath Ji Math Nagpura
- Sri Nath Ji Math Rasra
- Historical Ramleela Maidan Rasra
- Sri Nath Ji Math Maharajpur
- Sri Nath Ji Math Kanso-Patna
- Sri Kali Ji Temple Rasra
- Sri Khaki Baba Temple Khanwar
- Temple Bulaki das ki mathiya
- Sri Brahm Ji Temple Bramsthan
- Sri Lakhneswar Dham (Mundera)

== Demographics ==
As of 2019 India census, Rasra had a population of 29,263.

=== Languages ===
The primary languages spoken in Rasra are Hindi and Urdu, while Bhojpuri serves as the dominant regional language similar to wider Bhojpuri speaking belt of Purvanchal in the eastern Uttar Pradesh.

== Notable people ==
- GHURA RAM, former MLA , former Health Minister UP GOVT
- Uma Shankar Singh, former MLA

== History ==
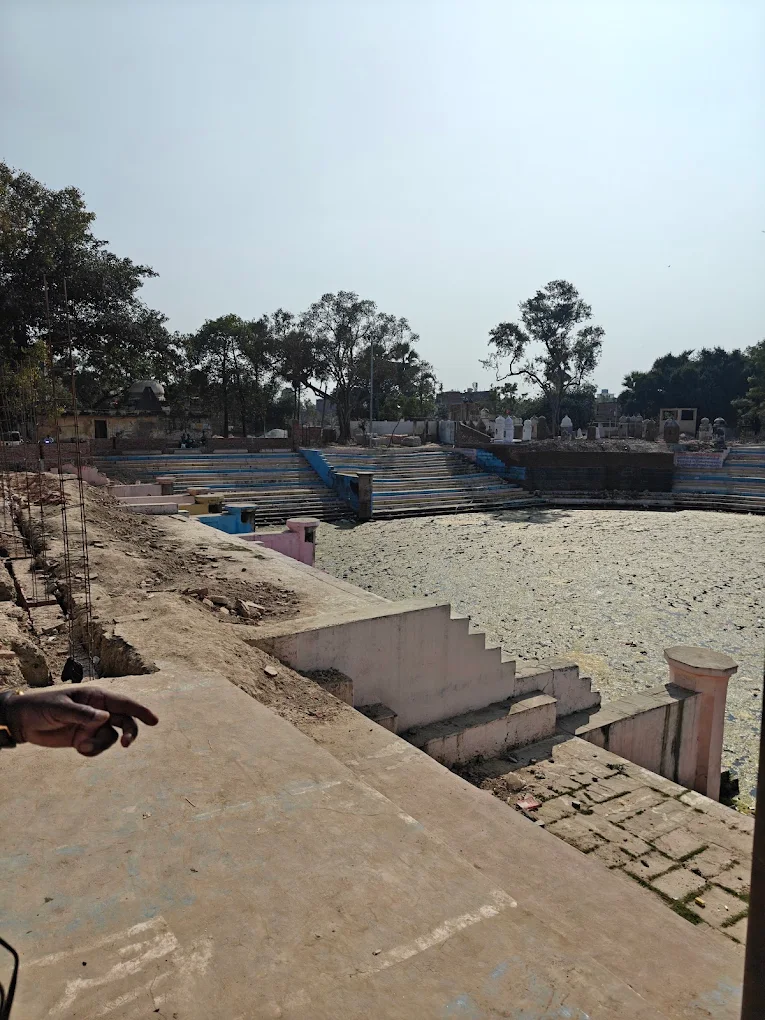
Nath baba Temple Kund

The area around Rasra, like the Auri area of Ballia district, was a part of the Kosala Mahajanpada in ancient times. In the medieval age this region was part of multiple ruling dynasties and became an important agrarian land holding under the local Sengar Rajputs in Lakhnesar pargana. A big historical site to be noticed in Rasra is Sri Nath Ji Temple which is related to an old tradition. Rasra is also called "Nath Nagri" due to the influence of the Nath Sampraday. During the late medieval period, Rasra became a fortified center under Sengar Rajputs, who resisted external control. In 1764, Balwant Singh who was the ruler of Narayan dynasty fought a two-day engagement here, after fierce fighting Balwant Singh captured the town. Hundreds of memorial stones sacred to the memory of the women who did Sati for their fallen husbands can be found near the large water tank (Kund) in the Nath Baba Temple. During the British Raj Rasra was a major center for resistance. It played an Important role in the Quit India Movement in early 1940s and was a hub of revolutionary activities, one such incident is Rasra kand occurred on 17th of August 1942.

== See also ==
Salempur, Chilkahar
