= Barauli, Ballia =

Coordinates: 26.040°N 83.692°E

Barauli (Barooli) is a village on the Ghosi–Nagra Road in Ballia district, Uttar Pradesh, India. It is 4 km west from Kiriharapur railway station.

The ex-prime minister Shree Chandrashekhar Singh's village is 2.5 km away. The Gram Pradhans of this village are Shree Chandrauday Singh Urf Mantu Singh and P.S Akash Singh Baghel (Golu). The village provided many activists in India's Freedom Struggle.

== Events ==
Many devotees come for the Ram Leela played in the Hindi month of Ashwin.

On the occasion of Mahashivratri, Kalash yatra and Baraat of Lord Shiva is organized.

=== Population ===
The population is 4231 and there are 578 houses. In 1974, females accounted for 46.7% of the population. The literacy rate is 65.9% (2790 people) and the female literacy rate is 27.2% (1149). The Scheduled Tribes' population is 2.1% (89) and the Scheduled Castes' population is 32.5% (1376). 44.3% of the residents are working. Children (0–6) will total 558 by 2011 and girls (0–6), 44.1% (246) by 2011.
