= List of districts of Uttar Pradesh =

Uttar Pradesh, the most populous state in India, has 75 districts. These districts, most of which have populations above 1.2 million, are grouped into 18 divisions for administrative convenience.

The Maha Kumbh area of Prayagraj had been declared as the 76th district of the state by the Uttar Pradesh Government as of 2 December 2024. It was a temporary district and now merged with original.

== District administration ==
The District Magistrate (DM), an Indian Administrative Service (IAS) officer, is the head of district administration and performs multiple key roles: as Collector (for land revenue administration), District Magistrate (for maintenance of law and order), and District Election Officer (for conducting elections). The District Magistrate chairs various district-level committees and coordinates the activities of different departments within the district. The DM is supported by Additional District Magistrates (ADMs) and Sub Divisional Magistrates (SDMs) for administrative duties. A district is divided into sub-divisions headed by Sub-Divisional Magistrates (SDMs), further into tehsils under tehsildars, and into villages for land revenue administration. Revenue Inspectors and Lekhpals assist the tehsildar in revenue related duties.

Other Key officers supporting district administration include:

- Senior Superintendent of Police (SSP) or Superintendent of Police (SP) – an Indian Police Service (IPS) officer in charge of police administration and law enforcement.
- Divisional Forest Officer (DFO) – an Indian Forest Service (IFS) officer managing forests and wildlife.
- Chief Development Officer (CDO) – an IAS officer responsible for development programs. The CDO is assisted by Block Development Officers (BDOs) at the block level.
- Other District Level Officers includes various district heads of sectoral/development departments, eg:- Regional Transport Officer, Chief Medical Officer, District Social Welfare Officer, District Panchayati Raj Officer, District Social Welfare Officer, District Supply Officer, District Labour Officer, District Employment Officer, District Agriculture Officer, Chief Fire Officer, Chief Veterinary Officer, Superintendent/Executive Engineer of PWD, etc.

== List of districts ==
Districts of Uttar Pradesh

Code	District	Headquarters	Formed (Note: All the pre-existing districts at the time of Independence are set to the Independence Day.)	Population	Area	Density (/km^{2})	Map
AG	Agra	Agra	15 August 1947	4,418,797	4,041	1093	
AL	Aligarh	Aligarh	15 August 1947	3,673,889	3,788	1007	
AN	Ambedkar Nagar	Akbarpur	29 September 1995	2,397,888	2,350	1020	
AM	Amethi	Gauriganj	1 July 2010	2,050,133	2,329.11	773	
AR	Amroha	Amroha	24 April 1997	1,840,221	2,249	818	
AU	Auraiya	Auraiya	17 September 1997	1,379,545	2,016	684	
AY	Ayodhya	Ayodhya	15 August 1947	2,470,996	2,522	1056	
AZ	Azamgarh	Azamgarh	15 August 1947	4,613,913	4,054	1138	
BD	Budaun	Budaun	15 August 1947	3,127,621	4,234	739	
BG	Bagpat	Baghpat	17 September 1997	1,303,048	1,321	986	
BH	Bahraich	Bahraich	15 August 1947	3,487,731	2,981	1170	
BL	Ballia	Ballia	15 August 1947	3,239,774	3,349	967	
BP	Balrampur	Balrampur	22 May 1997	2,148,665	4,408	487	
BN	Banda	Banda	15 August 1947	1,799,410	4,402	409	
BB	Barabanki	Barabanki	15 August 1947	3,260,699	4,120	791	
BR	Bareilly	Bareilly	15 August 1947	4,448,359	2,688	1655	
BS	Basti	Basti	15 August 1947	2,464,464	4,561	540	
BH	Bhadohi	Bhadohi	30 June 1994	1,715,183	1,646	1042	
BI	Bijnor	Bijnor	15 August 1947	3,682,713	4,262	864	
BU	Bulandshahr	Bulandshahr	15 August 1947	3,499,171	4,441	776	
CD	Chandauli	Chandauli	22 May 1997	1,952,756	2,541	768	
CT	Chitrakoot	Chitrakoot	6 May 1997	991,730	3,216	308	
DE	Deoria	Deoria	15 August 1947	3,100,946	2,540	1221	
ET	Etah	Etah	15 August 1947	1,774,480	2,431	730	
EW	Etawah	Etawah	15 August 1947	1,581,810	2,311	684	
FR	Farrukhabad	Fatehgarh	15 August 1947	1,885,204	2,181	864	
FT	Fatehpur	Fatehpur	15 August 1947	2,632,733	4,152	634	
FI	Firozabad	Firozabad	5 February 1989	2,498,156	2,407	1038	
GB	Gautam Buddha Nagar	Greater Noida	6 September 1997	1,648,115	720	2288	
GZ	Ghaziabad	Ghaziabad	14 November 1976	3,343,334	1,179	2836	
GP	Ghazipur	Ghazipur	15 August 1947	3,620,268	3,377	1072	
GN	Gonda	Gonda	15 August 1947	3,433,919	4,003	858	
GR	Gorakhpur	Gorakhpur	15 August 1947	4,440,895	3,321	1337	
HM	Hamirpur	Hamirpur	15 August 1947	1,104,285	4,021	275	
HA	Hapur	Hapur	28 September 2011	1,338,311	649	2061	
HR	Hardoi	Hardoi	15 August 1947	4,092,845	5,986	684	
HT	Hathras	Hathras	3 May 1997	1,564,708	1,840	850	
JL	Jalaun	Orai	15 August 1947	1,689,974	4,565	370	
JU	Jaunpur	Jaunpur	15 August 1947	4,494,204	4,038	1113	
JH	Jhansi	Jhansi	15 August 1947	1,998,603	5,024	398	
KJ	Kannauj	Kannauj	18 September 1997	1,656,616	2,093	792	
KD	Kanpur Dehat	Akbarpur	23 April 1981	1,796,184	3,021	595	
KN	Kanpur Nagar	Kanpur	15 August 1947	4,581,268	3,155	1452	
KG	Kasganj	Kasganj	15 April 2008	1,436,719	1,955	735	
KS	Kaushambi	Manjhanpur	4 April 1997	1,599,596	1,779	899	
KU	Kushinagar	Padarauna	13 May 1994	4,021,243	2,905	1200	
LK	Lakhimpur Kheri	Kheri	15 August 1947	3,564,544	7,680	520	
LA	Lalitpur	Lalitpur	1 March 1974	1,221,592	5,039	242	
LU	Lucknow	Lucknow	15 August 1947	4,589,838	2,528	1816	
MG	Maharajganj	Maharajganj	2 October 1989	2,684,703	2,952	909	
MH	Mahoba	Mahoba	11 February 1995	875,958	3,144	279	
MP	Mainpuri	Mainpuri	15 August 1947	1,868,529	2,760	677	
MT	Mathura	Mathura	15 August 1947	2,547,184	3,340	763	
MB	Mau	Mau	19 November 1988	2,205,968	1,713	1288	
ME	Meerut	Meerut	15 August 1947	3,443,689	2,559	1346	
MI	Mirzapur	Mirzapur	15 August 1947	2,496,970	4,405	567	
MO	Moradabad	Moradabad	15 August 1947	3,126,507	2,233	1400	
MU	Muzaffarnagar	Muzaffarnagar	15 August 1947	2,869,934	2,742	1047	
PI	Pilibhit	Pilibhit	15 August 1947	2,031,007	3,686	551	
PR	Pratapgarh	Pratapgarh	15 August 1947	3,209,141	3,717	863	
PY	Prayagraj	Prayagraj	15 August 1947	5,954,391	5,482	1086	
RB	Rae Bareli	Rae Bareli	15 August 1947	2,903,507	3,937	737	
RA	Rampur	Rampur	1 December 1949	2,335,819	2,367	987	
SA	Saharanpur	Saharanpur	15 August 1947	3,466,382	3,689	940	
SK	Sant Kabir Nagar	Khalilabad	5 September 1997	2,199,774	2,390	920	
SM	Sambhal	Bahjoi	3 May 2011	1,578,213	1,015	1555	
SJ	Shahjahanpur	Shahjahanpur	15 August 1947	3,006,538	4,388	685	
SH	Shamli	Shamli	3 May 2011	1,273,578	1,266	1006	
SV	Shravasti	Bhinga	22 May 1997	1,117,361	1,640	681	
SN	Siddharthnagar	Siddharthnagar	29 December 1988	2,559,297	2,895	884	
SI	Sitapur	Sitapur	15 August 1947	4,483,992	5,743	781	
SO	Sonbhadra	Robertsganj	4 March 1989	1,862,559	6,905	270	
SU	Sultanpur	Sultanpur	15 August 1947	2,249,036	2,457	915	
UN	Unnao	Unnao	15 August 1947	3,108,367	4,558	682	
VA	Varanasi	Varanasi	15 August 1947	3,676,841	1,535	2395	

== Proposals for new districts ==
Demands for the creation of new administrative districts in Uttar Pradesh frequently arise due to the state's massive population density, expansive geographical area, and the strategic need for localized international border management along Nepal. In late 2025, political announcements highlighted the ongoing administrative reorganization with the proposed creation of a 76th district, Kalyan Singh Nagar. Alongside such official state-level considerations, several local sub-divisions maintain active regional demands for district status.

List of Proposed Districts in Uttar Pradesh Grouped by Region and Current District
Proposed District	Expected Area of Jurisdiction	Rationale / Status
Rohilkhand Region (Proposed from Bareilly)
Baheri	Northern tracts of Bareilly district, bordering Uttarakhand and Nepal.	Proposed to manage international and interstate border administration and decentralize governance, as it is located 50 km north of Bareilly city.
Aonla	Southwestern blocks of Bareilly district.	Backed by state cabinet ministers and local representatives to establish a separate administrative headquarters approximately 40 km from Bareilly to improve public service delivery.
Terai Region (Proposed from Lakhimpur Kheri)
Gola Gokarannath	Northern blocks of Lakhimpur Kheri district along the India–Nepal border.	Demanded by local residents to split Lakhimpur Kheri—currently the largest district in the state by geographical area—thereby reducing travel distances to the district headquarters.
Terai Region (Proposed from Bahraich)
Nanpara	Northern border blocks of Bahraich district.	Proposed to establish a dedicated administrative and security presence along the sensitive India-Nepal border zone.
Purvanchal Region (Proposed from Gorakhpur and Maharajganj)
Pharenda (Anand Nagar)	Comprising three tehsils carved from the border areas of Gorakhpur and Maharajganj districts.	Proposed to consolidate cross-district sub-divisions into a single border district to improve regional infrastructure and governance along the Nepal border.
Purvanchal Region (Proposed from Jaunpur)
Shahganj	Northern blocks of Jaunpur district.	Demanded to decentralize administration in the southeastern Purvanchal region, bringing civic resources closer to local populations situated 35 km north of Jaunpur city.

== See also ==
- Divisions of Uttar Pradesh
- List of RTO districts in Uttar Pradesh
- List of urban local bodies in Uttar Pradesh
