= Dadri mela =

Annual fair in Uttar Pradesh, India

Dadri mela is an annual festival celebrated in Dadri, Ballia district of Uttar Pradesh. It is believed to have been started 5000 years ago and is currently organized by the Balia Municipal Corporation. The mela is associated with Hindu rishi Bhrigu and is named after his student rishi Dadar. it is believed to be started after the joining of Sarju and Ganga by rishi Dadar. The mela is held for one month in two phases, first phase is 10 days before Kartika Purnima and is the Second Largest Market for cattle and animal trade. The second phase is started on Kartika Purnima with evening Maha aarti.

== Story ==
According to Pauranic legends, when Rishi Bhrigu attacked Vishnu, he felt great remorse. To repent for his sins, he came back to Earth and started Prāyaścitta. During this time, due to his mastery in Jyotish Shastra, he learned that the river Ganga was going to dry up in the future. To prevent this, he asked his student, Rishi Dardr, to merge the Sarayu and Ganga rivers. Obeying his teacher's command, Rishi Dardr did so. The people at the confluence of the two rivers were overjoyed and celebrated the day as a festival. Since then, the mela has been celebrated annually.

== History ==
The mela is believed to have started in Pauranic times and is often believed to be 5000 years old. it has been celebrated at the same place but the animal fair and meena bazar were added later possibly during Mughal king Akbar's time.

== Events ==
- Animal Fair: held 10 days before the Kartika Purnima, the animal fair at Dadri mela is the main attraction for businesses and brings people from as far as Haryana and Rajasthan. It is the second largest animal fair in India and is known for its unique animals.
- Main mela: on Kartika Purnima the main Dadri mela is started with the Mahaaarti in the evening. Meena Bazar and the rides for enjoyment usually start in that period.
- Bhartendu Manch: annual Kavi sammelan and different events are organized by the government for promotion of culture and arts.
