= Belthara Road =

Belthara Road Siyar
- City
- Location in Uttar Pradesh, India
- Coordinates: 26°7′10.90″N 83°50′45.32″E
- Country: India
- State: Uttar Pradesh
- District: Ballia

Government
  - Type: Nagar Panchayat
  - Body: Local Body

Population (2011)
  - Total: 64,025

Languages
  - Official: Hindi and English
- Time zone: UTC+5:30 (IST)
- 221715 PIN: 221715
- Vehicle registration: UP 60

Belthara Road is a Nagar Panchayat city with a railway station in the north-western corner of Ballia district of Uttar Pradesh, India.

Belthara Road is the sub-district headquarters. The district headquarters of the city is Ballia which is 60 km away.

== Demographics ==
According to the 2011 Census, Belthara Road Nagar Panchayat had a population of 20,404 – 10,564 males and 9,840 females, giving a sex ratio of 931. There were 2,476 children aged 0–6 years while the literacy rate of 85.78% was much higher than the state average of 67.68%.

== Town Area ==
The main market area starts from Railway station to Bus Station and its multiple connected road and the road which connect Railway station to Trimuhani followed by Chaukia Mod. Here are key landmarks of Belthara Road

- Railway Station
- Mandir in Railway Compound
- Dak Bangla
- Jama Masjid
- Bichla Pokhra Mandir Area
- Ramlila Ground
- Shiv Mandir
- Bus Station
- Trimuhani
- Baranwal Dharamshala
- Chaukia

== Schools ==
- Dayanand Anglo-Vedic Inter College: One of the oldest schools in the town for sixth- to twelfth-grade students, it is next to the railway station.
- Gandhi Mohammad Ali Memorial (G M A M) Inter College: Another old school for sixth- to twelfth-grade boys, it is also next to the railway station.
- Shayam Sundari Girls Inter College: Girls-only school
- Devendra P. G. Degree College: On the Belthara-Madhuban road.Road
- Late Kesav Prasad Mahavidyalay & PG College, Sasana Bhadurpur
- M. M. D. Public School: Secondary co-ed school with dormitory facilities
- NavJeevan English School: Secondary co-ed school
- New Central Public School (Nursery to 10th+2 C.B.S.E.Pat) near Vishal Talkies.
- Nirmal Jeevan Public School, near Indouli Gram sabha.
- Saraswati shishu vidya mandir is located in chakiya road, Belthara Road ballia. It's one of the most popular and religious school of Belthara Road.
- St. Xavier's School, Belthara Road (Nursery to 10th+2 C.B.S.E.Pat) near Piprauli Bada Gaon One of the oldest CBSE Board School
- D N Children school is located in kundail near to railway station

== Attractions ==
- Indauli, a temple of Lord Shiva & Dihbaba, Ramlila
- The Bhageshwari temple, dedicated to the goddess of the same name, is between Ballia and Belthara Road and is the most-visited place of worship by local Hindus. A month-long annual fair, Sonadih Mela, is held here in conjunction with Navratri.
- Ghaghara river and its bank
