= Azamgarh division =

Administrative division of Uttar Pradesh, India

Coordinates: 26°04′10″N 83°11′06″E

Azamgarh
- Division of Uttar Pradesh
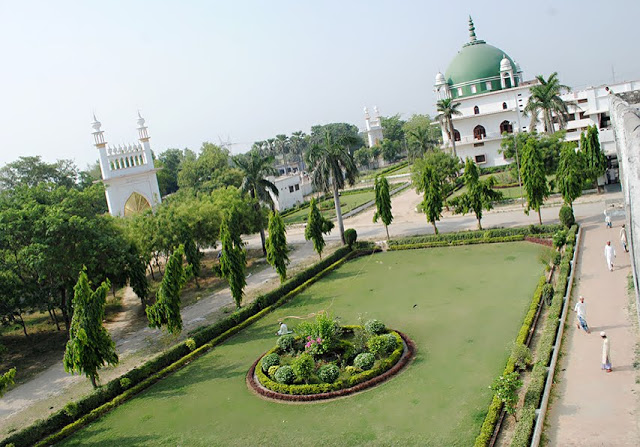
- Jamiatul Ashrafia in Azamgarh City

- Location within Uttar Pradesh Location within India Location within Asia
- Country: India
- State: Uttar Pradesh

Area
  - Total: 3,378 sq mi (8,748 km^{2})

Population (2011)Note
  - Total: 10,059,655
  - Density: 2,978/sq mi (1,150/km^{2})
- (Note: Calculated from AZAMGARH, MAU and BALLIA population censuses)

Languages
  - Official: English • Hindi • Urdu
- Time zone: UTC+5:30 (IST)

Azamgarh division is one of the 18 administrative geographical units (i.e. division) of the northern Indian state of Uttar Pradesh. It was formed on 15 November 1994 after being separated from Gorakhpur division and Varanasi division, with Azamgarh city being the divisional headquarters. Azamgarh division consists of 3 districts:-

- Azamgarh
- Ballia
- Mau

== Demographics ==
Azamgarh has a population of 10,059,655 (10m). Households = 1,469,924

The household density is 6.84 people per household.

As of 2011 census, Azamgarh had a Male population of 5,072,615 and Female population of 4,987,040. The children population is 1,5191,19.

== See also ==
- Districts of Uttar Pradesh
