= Ballia district =

- District
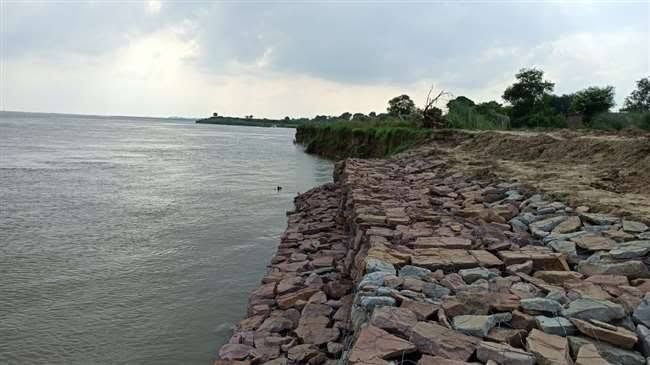
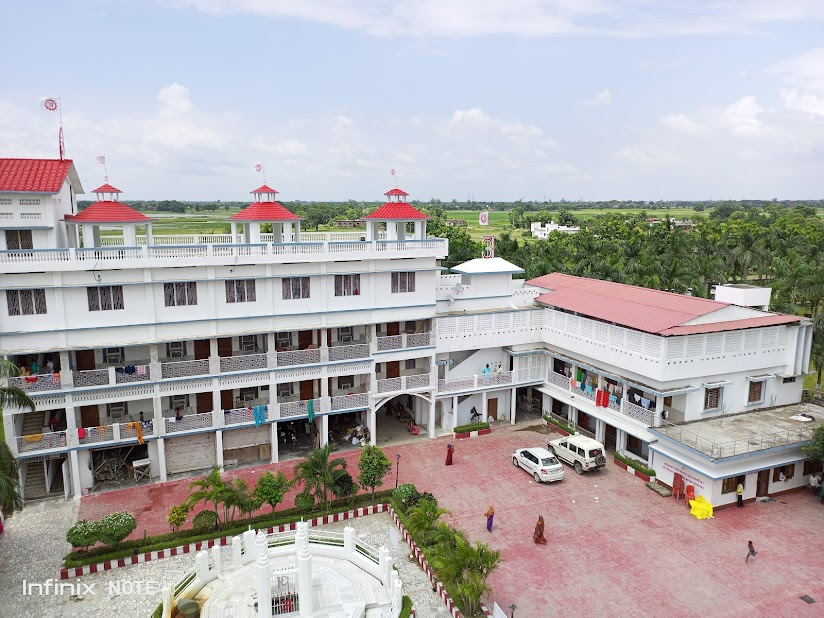
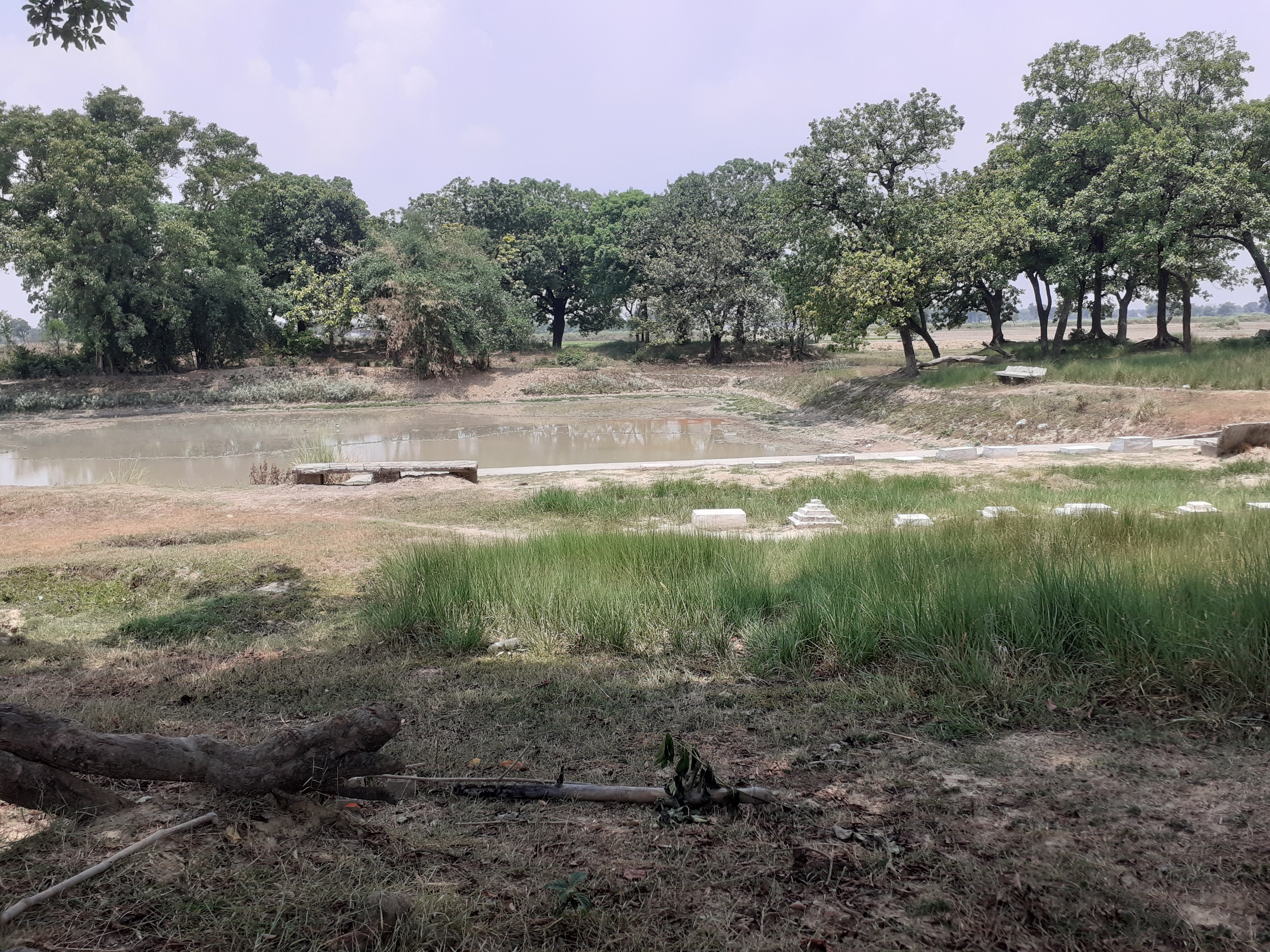
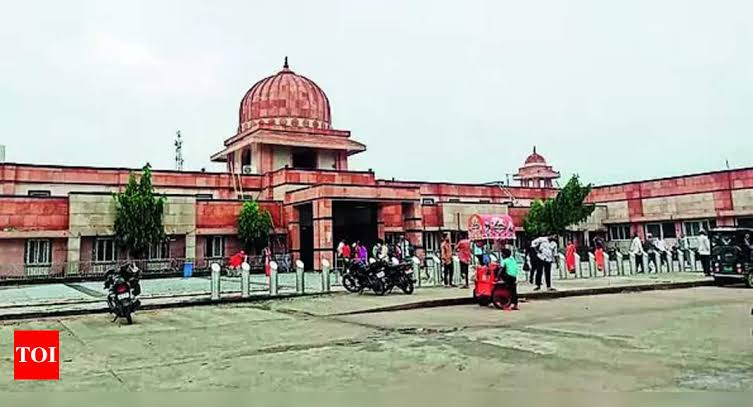
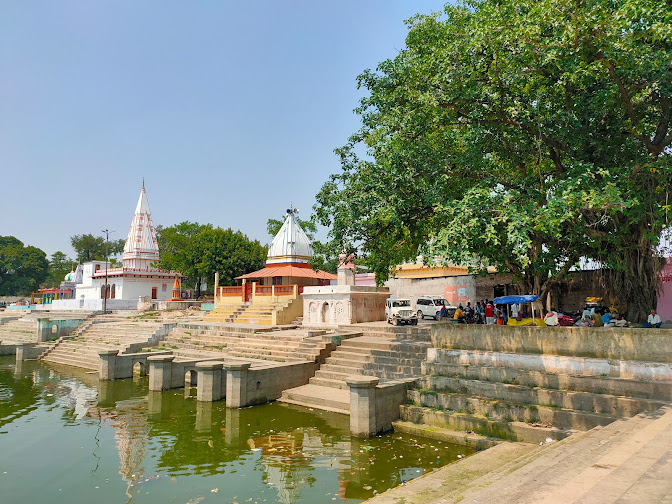
- Ganges River at Ballia Historic Vrittikut Ashram at Pakdi, Ballia Historic Chhath Puja Ghat at Piyarahi, Ballia Ballia Railway Station Nath Baba Temple Ballia

- Location of Ballia district in Uttar Pradesh
- Coordinates (Ballia): 28.2°N 79.3667°E
- Country: India
- State: Uttar Pradesh
- Division: Azamgarh
- Headquarters: Ballia
- Tehsils: Ballia; Bairia; Bansdih; Belthara Road; Rasra; Sikanderpur

Government
  - Lok Sabha constituencies: Ballia, Salempur and Ghosi

Area
  - Total: 2,981 km^{2} (1,151 sq mi)

Population (2011)
  - Total: 3,239,774
  - Density: 1,087/km^{2} (2,815/sq mi)
  - Urban: 304,109

Language
  - Official: Hindi
  - Additional official: Urdu
  - Regional language: Bhojpuri

Demographics
  - Literacy: 73.82%
  - Sex ratio: 933
- Time zone: UTC+05:30 (IST)
- Major highways: UP SH 1, UP SH 1B, NH 31, Ballia Greenfield Expressway
- Average annual precipitation: 1608.9 mm
- Website: ballia.nic.in

Ballia district is one of the districts of Uttar Pradesh, India. Ballia district is a part of Azamgarh division situated in the east of Uttar Pradesh. The main economic activity is agriculture. Ballia city is the district headquarters and commercial market of this district. It is the birthplace of former prime minister of India Chandra Shekhar There are six tehsils in this district: Ballia, Bansdih, Rasra, Bairia, Sikandarpur and Belthara. Rasra is the second major commercial area of the district, having a government sugar mill and a cotton weaving industry. Though Ballia's core occupation is agriculture there are some additional small industries. Maniar is known for its bindi industry and is a major supplier.

== History ==
In the early historic period, there appears to have been a fairly significant urban centre at the site of present-day Pakkakot, where archaeologists have found city walls dating back to the Maurya period and a Buddhist monastery dating from the Gupta or post-Gupta period.

Ballia district was established in 1879 out of Ghazipur district along with some parts of Azamgarh district. Before being separated, Ballia tehsil had formed a subdivision of Ghazipur district, comprising the parganas of Ballia, Doaba, and Kharid. In addition, the new district included the parganas of Lakhnesar and Kopachit from Ghazipur district, as well as Bhadaon and Sikandarpur from Azamgarh district. These formed the tehsil of Rasra.

Some administrative changes then took place in the following years. In April 1882, Bansdih tehsil was created out of Kharid pargana along with the new pargana of Sikandarpur East, which was formed out of 225 villages of Sikandarpur pargana. At the same time, 212 villages of Kopachit pargana were detached to form the new pargana of Kopachit East, which went into Ballia tehsil. Then in April 1883, tappa Dhaka of pargana Zahurabad was joined with Sikandarpur West, and in November 1884, 13 villages of Lakhnesar pargana that lay on the right bank of the Sarju were transferred back into Ghazipur district. Another major change happened in March 1892, when the parganas of Garha and Sarai Kota, previously in Muhammadabad tehsil of Ghazipur district, were moved into Ballia and placed in Ballia tehsil.

Other more minor changes also took place due to the shifting course of the major rivers. For example, in June 1892, the village of Diara Khawaspur was transferred into Ballia district from Shahabad district because it had now come to be on the left bank of the Ganges. Then in January 1896, the four villages of Bijaura, Sital Patti, Sheopur, and Bhelsipah were transferred into Ballia from Shahabad for the same reason. However, these changes had little impact on the local population because when the villages became flooded, residents generally retreated inland on the same side of the river, rather than crossing over into the new district.

Until 1794, the area of modern Ballia district had formed part of Benares State. On 27 October of that year, Raja Mahip Narayan Singh signed a treaty to cede the territory to the British.

=== Struggle for independence ===
In 1908, students at the government school in Ballia held a procession to celebrate the release of nationalist writer B.G. Tilak from prison. When the students reached the kutchery, the police made a lathi charge on them and many students were maimed. 25 students were expelled and many others quit in order to focus on political activities.

When Mahatma Gandhi launched the non-cooperation movement in the early 1920s, the people in Ballia district responded enthusiastically. A volunteer force of 2,600 was raised in the district to help organise meetings and protests and conduct night patrols. The district also contributed a sum of 13,000 rupees to the Tilak Memorial Swaraj Fund. Stores selling alcohol were picketed, and many palm trees were cut down throughout the district (due to their being used to make arrack). Law courts and government offices were boycotted, and many students stopped attending school in order to take part in meetings and processions. British goods were also boycotted, and foreign goods were burnt in public: among the recorded incidents in Ballia district were one ganja seller in Rasra and a number of cloth merchants in Ballia who publicly burnt their wares in protest.

On 4 April 1922 Jawaharlal Nehru spoke to a crowd of 3,000 people in Ballia. Then, on 21 and 22 June, Motilal Nehru and Madan Mohan Malaviya also gave addresses at Rasra and Ballia, where they promoted Swadeshi ideas including the revival of hand-spinning and hand-weaving, ending untouchability among Hindus, prohibition of alcohol, and Hindu-Muslim unity. Their speeches received very positive receptions, and a national school was established at Bansdih while spinning wheels were distributed in rural parts of the district.

Jawaharlal Nehru returned to Ballia in 1923, where he gave a speech denouncing Gandhi's arrest and imprisonment. As a result, on 18 March (exactly one year after Gandhi's arrest), members of the district held a total hartal. Gandhi himself later visited the district in 1925, where he thanked the district residents for their enthusiastic participation in the non-cooperation movement. Later, in protest of the Simon Commission in 1928, all schools run by the Ballia district board were closed and a complete hartal observed.

In early 1930, many Ballia district residents took part in the salt satyagraha. Then, beginning on 12 April, salt was publicly manufactured in Ballia in violation of the British salt law. People in Reoti, Rasra, and Bansdih later followed suit.

==== Quit India Movement ====
During the Quit India Movement of 1942, Ballia district saw much activity, leading to it gaining the nickname "Revolutionary Ballia". On 19 August people raised the Indian tricolour at the Bairia police station, but the officers took it down. In protest, on the 18th, a crowd of some 25,000 people gathered and attempted to replace the flag. The police officers opened fire on the protestors, killing at least 20 and injuring about 100 more. This began around 14:00 and continued for about six hours. That night, however, the police evacuated the station, and it was occupied by the protestors the next morning.

The violence against protestors at Bairia outraged locals, who took up arms in spite of the ideal of nonviolent resistance generally prevailing until then. A crowd of around 50,000 marched toward the district jail to free their compatriots whom the British had arrested. When the district magistrate (who was himself Indian) learned of this, he went to the imprisoned local leaders, including Chittu Pandey and Ramanant Pandey, and offered to release them provided they pacified the crowd. When they refused, the magistrate asked them to ensure that no harm was done to the treasury, jail, and government property. When they refused again, and the magistrate was left with no choice but to release them unconditionally and merely hope they would then leave the government property alone.

After their release, the leaders held a massive town hall meeting, where Chittu Pandey urged the people "not to indulge in sabotage or similar activities." Many disregarded this, however, so outraged were they at the British police's violence, and went about looting houses of government officers along with those viewed as collaborators with the government, as well as shops selling liquor and foreign cloth. The district magistrate, now sure that the treasury would be raided, ordered the currency amounts to be noted and then the money itself burned. On 20 August the people of Ballia proclaimed independence from the British, declared itself part of the Congress raj, and set up a local governing body with Chittu Pandey at its head.

However, British troops entered Ballia during the night of 22–23 August and deposed the local government. They arrested anyone who had taken part — or was suspected to have taken part — in the revolutionary activities, beat and tortured them, and burned down their houses. Some were intentionally starved. In March 1944, Feroze Gandhi and a lawyer from Allahabad came by rail to give legal representation to the prisoners; their arrival was celebrated by a growing crowd that became a procession as they made their way to the Chowk. Other lawyers then followed suit.

In 1972, in honour of the anniversary of the independence of India, 616 people in Ballia district were recognized for their (or their family members') contributions during the struggle for independence with copper plate inscriptions.

== Demography ==
Historical population
Year	Pop.	±% p.a.
1901	942,234	—
1911	807,912	−1.53%
1921	793,759	−0.18%
1931	872,177	+0.95%
1941	1,007,318	+1.45%
1951	1,141,739	+1.26%
1961	1,280,517	+1.15%
1971	1,509,172	+1.66%
1981	1,849,673	+2.06%
1991	2,261,502	+2.03%
2001	2,760,667	+2.01%
2011	3,239,774	+1.61%

According to the 2011 census Ballia district had a population of 3,239,774, roughly equal to the nation of Mauritania or the US state of Iowa. This gives it a ranking of 108th in India (out of a total of 640). The district has a population density of 1,087 inhabitants per square kilometre (2,820/sq mi). Its population growth rate over the decade 2001-2011 was 16.73%. Ballia has a sex ratio of 937 females for every 1000 males, and a literacy rate of 73.94%. 9.39% of the population lives in urban areas. Scheduled Castes and Scheduled Tribes made up 15.27% and 3.40% of the population respectively.

Of Ballia’s total population, 2,935,665 people lived in rural areas and 304,109 in urban areas according to the 2011 Census. Children aged 0–6 years made up 14.6% of the district’s population.

Literacy patterns also varied within the district. Male literacy stood at 81.5% and female literacy at 59.8% in 2011, while rural literacy (70.2%) remained below the urban rate of 77.6%.

Ballia’s fertility indicators showed steady improvement. The district’s Crude Birth Rate in 2011 was 21.8 per 1,000, and its Total Fertility Rate declined from 3.8 in 2001 to 3.1 in 2011.

More recent NFHS-5 results (2020–21) indicate further progress, including a rise in institutional births to 90%, improved sanitation access, and increases in the proportion of women with ten or more years of schooling.

Religions in Ballia district (2011)
Religion	Percent
Hinduism	92.73%
Islam	6.59%
Other or not stated	0.68%

Among the largest Hindu groups in Ballia district are the Rajputs, with many of them living throughout the district. Some two dozen Dalit groups live in Ballia district, with the largest being the Chamars and the Dobgars.

Most Muslims in Ballia district belong to the Sunni tradition of Islam, although there is also a small portion who practice Shia Islam. The largest Muslim community is the Julahas, whose traditional occupation of weaving is still widespread. The second-largest Muslim group is the Sheikhs, who generally are most numerous in Rasra tehsil; their subdivisions include Siddiqui, Ansari, Quraishi, Usmani, Faruqui, and Abbasi.

There is also a small Sikh population in Ballia district, most of whom are originally immigrants from Pakistan. They mostly live in urban areas.

=== Languages ===
Languages of Ballia district (2011)
1. Bhojpuri (82.0%)
2. Hindi (17.0%)
3. Others (1.07%)

At the time of the 2011 Census of India, 81.96% of the population in the district spoke Bhojpuri, 16.97% Hindi and 0.94% Urdu as their first language.

== Culture ==
Contribution of Ballia to Hindi Literature is immense as many prominent scholars hail from Ballia such as Hazari Prasad Dwivedi, Bhairav Prasad Gupt, Kedaranath Singh and Amar Kant. Other notable persons belonging to the district are brother duo Baldev Upadhyaya, Sanskrit critic and Krishndev Upadhyaya, Bhojpuri scholar with works in Bhojpuri folk literature and Hindi litterateur Doodhnath Singh. In the new generation, young author Atul Kumar Rai has received the Sahitya Akademi Yuva Puraskar 2023 for his debut Hindi novel Chandpur ki Chanda.

Ballia is surrounded by two major river Ganga and Ghaghra (Saryu) that make this land more fertile.

Ballia is also considered as a holy Hindu city. It has big and small temples. Bhrigu temple in Bhrigu Ashram is a temple where Bhrigu Muni was supposed to reside. Bhrigu muni is the one who according to ancient Hindu texts hit Lord Vishnu on his chest. Behind Bhrigu Ashram earlier River Ganga used to flow. A Dadri mela (fair) is still held annually in the winter season, which is Asia's 2nd largest fair and people from all around the Ballia and many neighboring districts and even from other states come here to visit it. It lasts about a month.

== Cuisine ==
Ballia is famous for its dish, Litti Chokha. It's popularly served in many stalls and restaurants across the city.

Puri of this region is popular because of its large size. It is served in marriages, and other functions.

Ballia district's large Hindu population is generally vegetarian. The standard meal for most people consists of chapatis eaten with dal and cooked vegetables. Instead of having a full meal during the middle of the day, many people often eat a satua made of barley, gram, or peas. Parched gram, peas, or wheat is another everyday staple, often eaten with rab (molasses) or jaggery. Tea is a popular beverage in both urban and rural areas. Jackfruit is also popular in Ballia district. When ripe, it is eaten with curd.

== Political ==
Ballia was the home of some distinguished freedom fighters who fought against the oppressive British imperialist government and managed to liberate the area from the British Raj from Ballia for a few days from 19 August 1942 under the leadership of Chittu Pandey and others. Due to this, the Ballia region is also known as Baaghi Ballia (rebellious Ballia).

Notable political personalities from this district include Ram Nagina Singh, Ex-MP 1952 in Ballia from the Prajatantrik Socialist Party (PSP). Chandra Shekhar, also known as the 'Young Turk' became the eighth prime minister of India on 10 November 1990 and continued until 21 June 1991 (224 days). He was born and brought up in Ibrahimpatti village in Ballia district. He holds the record as the longest serving member of Lok sabha for Ballia constituency.

Mangal Pandey, the well-known freedom fighter was also from this city and was the first person to participate in an armed struggle against the British East India Company in the Indian Rebellion of 1857.

Chittu Pandey, Murli Manohar, Tarkeshwar Pandey, Ram Singhasan Thakur, Tripurari Mishra, Gauri Shankar Rai and hundreds of leaders fought for independence during that period. Murli Manohar, Tarkeshwar Pandey, and Gauri Shankar Rai were members of Lok Sabha and are no more. Gauri Shankar Rai was a member of UP Assembly, UP Council and as Member of Indian Parliament.

== Tourism ==
There are a number of tourist attractions in Ballia, which include:

- Surha Tal Bird Sanctuary

== Temples ==
There is a temple of Kameshwar Dham in Ballia district of Uttar Pradesh. The specialty of this temple is that here Lord Shiva got angry and consumed Kamadeva. Lord Shri Ram, Lakshmana had come along with Maharishi Vishvamitra to this land. Sage Durvasa did penance here. Devotees from far and wide come to visit this temple. It is believed about this Dham that it is the same place mentioned in Shiva Purana and Valmiki Ramayana where Lord Shiva burnt the commander of the gods Kamadeva to ashes. Here even today there is that half-burnt, green mango tree (tree) hiding behind which Kamadeva shot a flower arrow at Lord Shankar, who was absorbed in the samadhi.

== Climate ==
Climate data for Ballia (1981–2010, extremes 1956–2012)
Month	Jan	Feb	Mar	Apr	May	Jun	Jul	Aug	Sep	Oct	Nov	Dec	Year
Record high °C (°F)	29.0 (84.2)	35.9 (96.6)	42.1 (107.8)	46.5 (115.7)	48.0 (118.4)	47.5 (117.5)	43.0 (109.4)	39.4 (102.9)	37.9 (100.2)	38.1 (100.6)	36.4 (97.5)	34.0 (93.2)	48.0 (118.4)
Mean daily maximum °C (°F)	20.5 (68.9)	25.3 (77.5)	31.5 (88.7)	37.0 (98.6)	38.5 (101.3)	36.6 (97.9)	33.3 (91.9)	33.0 (91.4)	32.5 (90.5)	31.6 (88.9)	28.6 (83.5)	23.5 (74.3)	31.0 (87.8)
Mean daily minimum °C (°F)	7.1 (44.8)	10.3 (50.5)	15.2 (59.4)	20.8 (69.4)	24.6 (76.3)	26.0 (78.8)	25.6 (78.1)	25.6 (78.1)	24.9 (76.8)	21.2 (70.2)	14.9 (58.8)	9.1 (48.4)	18.8 (65.8)
Record low °C (°F)	1.0 (33.8)	0.0 (32.0)	5.0 (41.0)	10.8 (51.4)	15.7 (60.3)	16.3 (61.3)	16.4 (61.5)	17.6 (63.7)	17.0 (62.6)	10.4 (50.7)	5.8 (42.4)	1.4 (34.5)	0.0 (32.0)
Average rainfall mm (inches)	4.8 (0.19)	7.3 (0.29)	1.0 (0.04)	6.8 (0.27)	18.1 (0.71)	93.8 (3.69)	184.2 (7.25)	178.9 (7.04)	149.8 (5.90)	31.8 (1.25)	6.2 (0.24)	1.7 (0.07)	684.3 (26.94)
Average rainy days	0.6	0.6	0.2	0.6	1.3	3.9	8.4	7.7	5.8	1.0	0.5	0.2	30.7
Average relative humidity (%) (at 17:30 IST)	71	64	54	42	48	61	77	80	80	74	68	73	66
Source: India Meteorological Department

Balia District is vulnerable to the effects of heat waves. In 2023, 54 people were killed in a heat wave in Balia District.

== Divisions ==
Tahsils and nagar panchayats in Ballia District
Tahsil	Nagar panchayat
Ballia City	Ballia Nagar Palika Parishad; Ratsar Kala Nagar Panchayat; Chitbara Gaon Nagar Panchayat; Premchak Urf Baheri Census Town; Middha Census Town; Bairia; Bairia Nagar Panchayat
Bansdih	Reoti Nagar Panchayat; Bansdih Nagar Panchayat; Sahatwar Nagar Panchayat; Maniyar Nagar Panchayat
Belthara Road	Belthara Road Nagar Panchayat
Rasra	Rasra Nagar Palika Parishad
Sikanderpur	Sikanderpur Nagar Panchayat

== University ==
The Jananayak Chandrashekhar University, Ballia is a state university established in 2016 by the Government of Uttar Pradesh in Ballia, Uttar Pradesh.

== Villages ==
- Awayan
- Banspar Bahorwa
- Barauli
- Farsatar
- Govindpur
- Jamalpur
- Jharkatahan
- Medawara Kala
- Maurha
- Nagwa
- Narhi (Nagra)
- Pandah
- Parikhara
- Salempur, Chilkahar
- Sawrubandh
