= Ballia =

City in Uttar Pradesh, India

- City
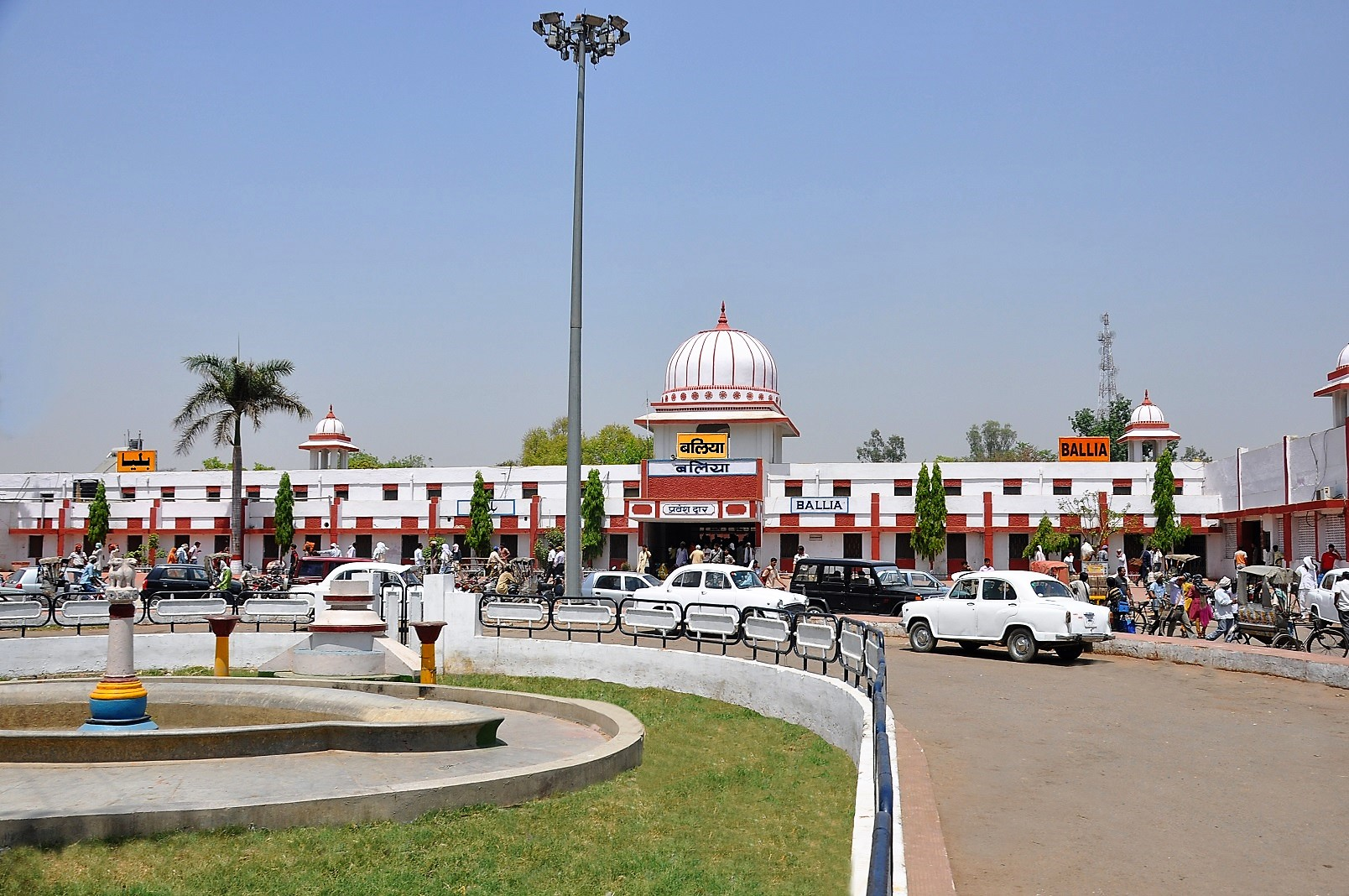
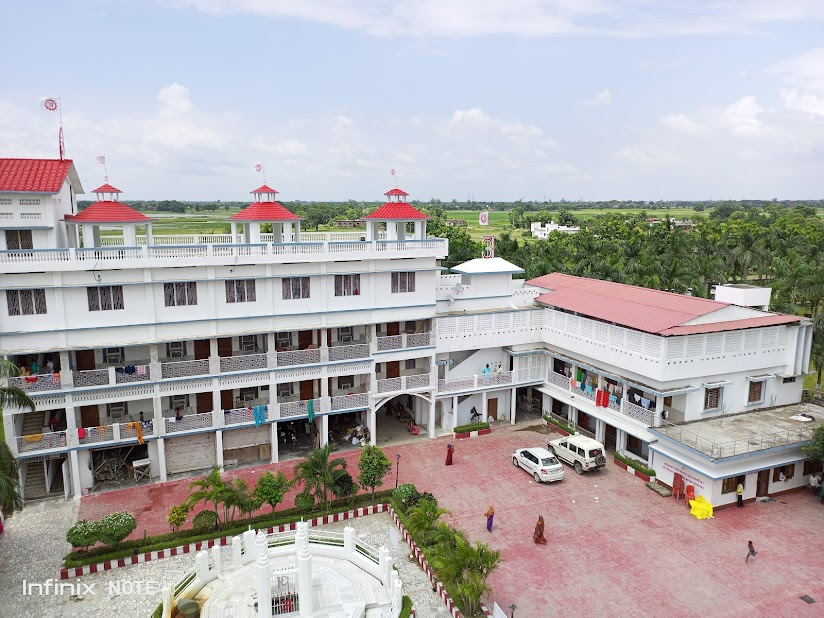
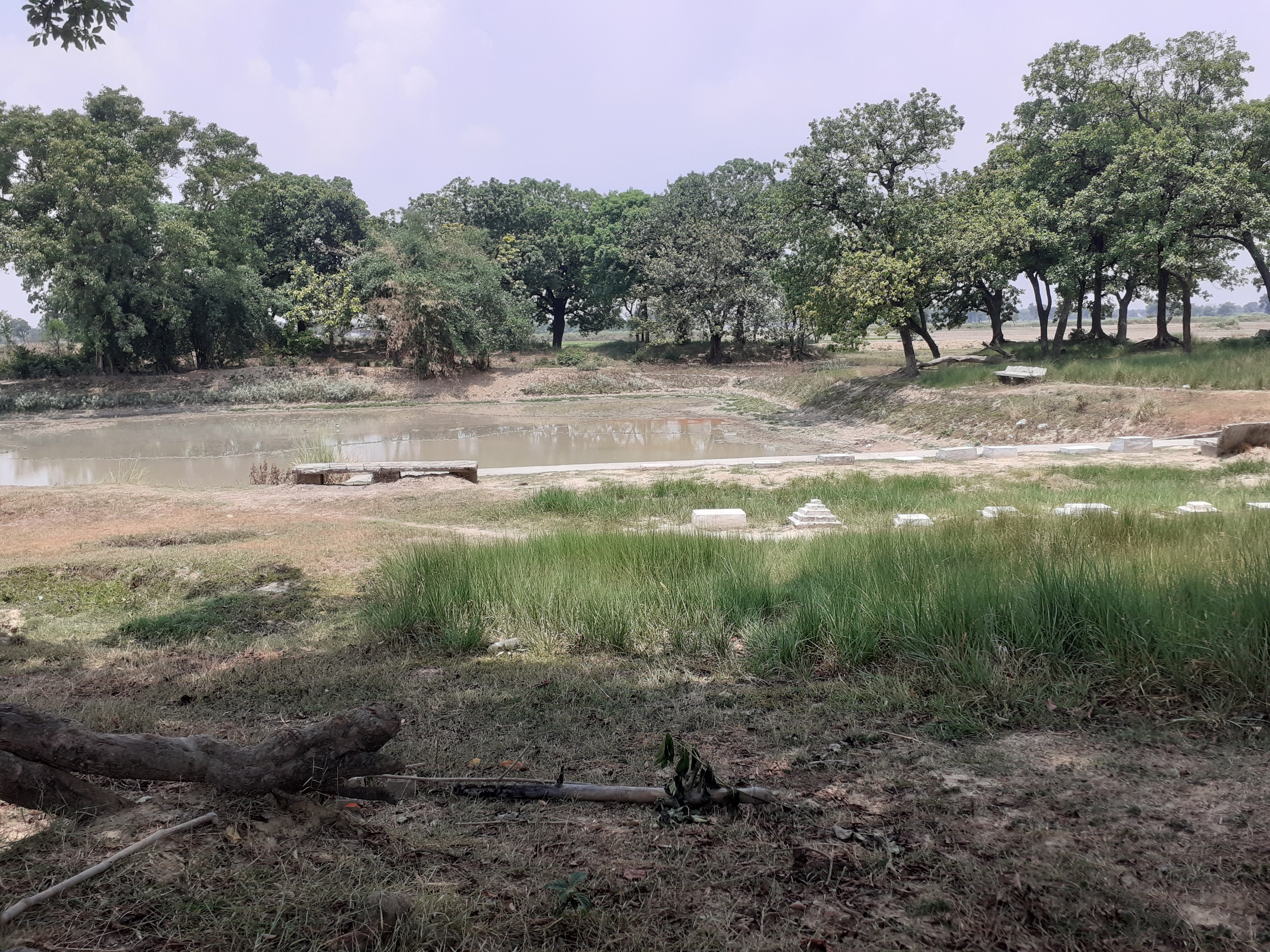
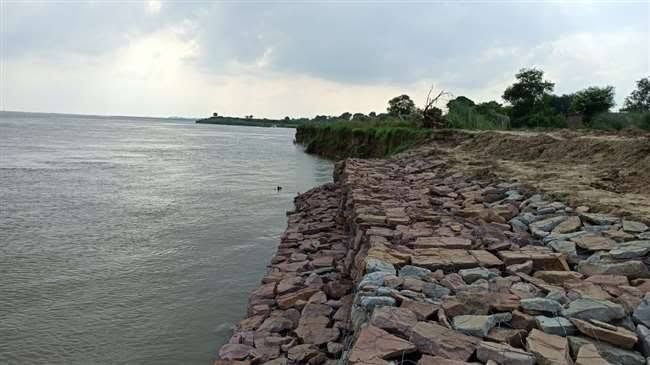
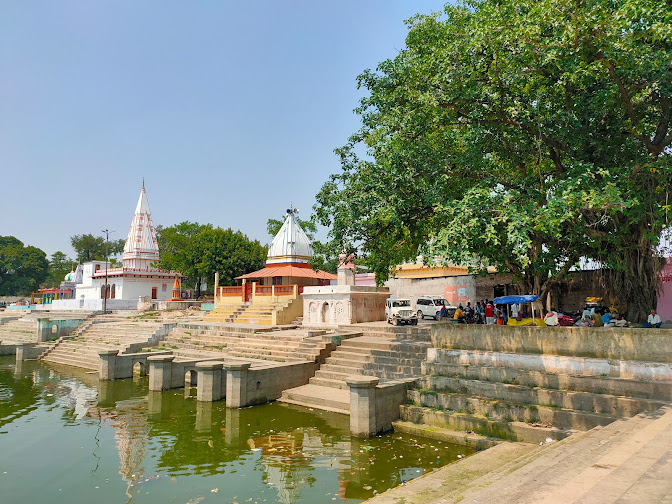
- Ballia Railway Station Historic Vrittikut Ashram at Pakdi, Ballia Historic Chhath Puja Ghat at Piyarahi, Ballia Ganges River at Ballia Nath Baba Temple Ballia

- Location of Ballia in Uttar Pradesh, India Ballia (India)
- Coordinates: 25°45′37″N 84°08′49″E
- Country: India
- State: Uttar Pradesh
- District: Ballia

Government
  - Type: Municipal council

Population (2011)
  - Total: 104,424

Language
  - Official: Hindi
  - Additional official: Urdu
  - Regional: Bhojpuri
- Time zone: UTC+5:30 (IST)
- PIN: 277001
- Telephone code: 05498
- Vehicle registration: UP-60
- Website: ballia.nic.in

Ballia is a city with a municipal board in the Indian state of Uttar Pradesh. The eastern boundary of the city lies at the junction of two major rivers, the Ganges and the Ghaghara. The city is situated 150 km (93 mi) equidistant from Gorakhpur & Varanasi and about 380 km from the state capital Lucknow. Ballia is around 120 km (75 mi) from Patna, Bihar. It is home to a protected area, the Jai Prakash Narayan bird sanctuary.

== Etymology ==
The name Ballia is an ancligised spelling of Hindi Baliyā (Devanagari: बलिया). According to Paul Whalley, the name is derived from the personal name Bali along with the suffix -ā. The "y" in the name is a glide inserted between the vowels to make it easier to pronounce; the resulting similarity to the diminutive suffix -iyā is only coincidental.

According to locals, the name Ballia was derived from the name of the sage Valmiki, the author of Ramayana. Valmiki resided here at one point, and the place was commemorated by a shrine (although it has long since been washed away). Another belief about the origin of the name is that it refers to the sandy quality of the soil, locally known as "Ballua" (balu meaning sand).

== Geography ==
Ballia district is the easternmost part of the Uttar Pradesh state and borders on Bihar State. It comprises an irregularly shaped tract extending westward from the confluence of the Ganga and the Ghaghra, the former separating it from Bihar in the south and the latter from Deoria and Bihar in the north and east respectively. The boundary between Ballia and Bihar is determined by the deep streams of these two rivers. It is bounded on the west by Mau, on the north by Deoria, on the north-east and south-east by Bihar and on the south-west by Ghazipur. The district lies between the parallels of 25º33' and 26º11' North latitudes and 83º38' and 84º39' East longitudes. Ballia is among the least forest covered districts in India.

== Climate ==
Climate data for Ballia (1991–2020, extremes 1956–2020)
Month	Jan	Feb	Mar	Apr	May	Jun	Jul	Aug	Sep	Oct	Nov	Dec	Year
Record high °C (°F)	29.0 (84.2)	35.9 (96.6)	42.1 (107.8)	46.5 (115.7)	48.0 (118.4)	47.5 (117.5)	43.0 (109.4)	39.4 (102.9)	38.6 (101.5)	38.6 (101.5)	36.4 (97.5)	34.0 (93.2)	48.0 (118.4)
Mean daily maximum °C (°F)	20.4 (68.7)	26.1 (79.0)	32.0 (89.6)	37.6 (99.7)	38.2 (100.8)	37.3 (99.1)	33.7 (92.7)	34.0 (93.2)	34.2 (93.6)	33.4 (92.1)	29.4 (84.9)	22.7 (72.9)	31.6 (88.9)
Mean daily minimum °C (°F)	8.7 (47.7)	10.5 (50.9)	13.8 (56.8)	21.8 (71.2)	25.4 (77.7)	27.5 (81.5)	27.1 (80.8)	27.3 (81.1)	26.3 (79.3)	22.5 (72.5)	15.9 (60.6)	10.4 (50.7)	19.5 (67.1)
Record low °C (°F)	1.0 (33.8)	0.0 (32.0)	5.0 (41.0)	10.8 (51.4)	15.7 (60.3)	16.3 (61.3)	16.4 (61.5)	17.6 (63.7)	17.0 (62.6)	10.4 (50.7)	5.8 (42.4)	1.4 (34.5)	0.0 (32.0)
Average rainfall mm (inches)	7.6 (0.30)	10.9 (0.43)	7.7 (0.30)	9.2 (0.36)	30.7 (1.21)	125.9 (4.96)	255.9 (10.07)	206.5 (8.13)	183.0 (7.20)	46.4 (1.83)	2.4 (0.09)	3.4 (0.13)	889.5 (35.02)
Average rainy days	0.8	1.0	1.0	1.0	2.0	5.8	10.7	9.3	7.4	1.8	0.1	0.2	41.1
Average relative humidity (%) (at 17:30 IST)	81	72	60	42	49	63	79	79	77	71	66	76	68
Source: India Meteorological Department

== Demographics ==
In 1901, Ballia had a population of 15,278. According to the 2001 Indian census, Ballia had a population of 102,226. Males constituted 54% of the population and females 46%. Ballia had an average literacy rate of 65%, which was higher than the national average of 59.5%, with 58% of the males and 42% of females being literate. 11% of the population was under six years of age.

As of 2011 Indian Census, Ballia had a total population of 104,424, of which 55,459 were males and 48,965 were females with a sex ratio of 883 females per 1000 males. The population within the age group of 0 to 6 years was 11,623. The total number of literates in Ballia was 77,331, which constituted 74.1% of the population with male literacy of 78.0% and female literacy of 69.5%. The effective literacy rate of 7+ population of Ballia was 83.3%, of which male literacy rate was 88.0% and female literacy rate was 78.0%. The Scheduled Castes and Scheduled Tribes population was 8,703 and 3,942 respectively. Ballia had 15772 households in 2011.

=== Religion ===
Religion in Ballia city (2011)
Religion	Percent
Hinduism	88.39%
Islam	10.39%
Others	1.22%

Hinduism is major religion in Ballia city, with 92,299 Hindus (88.39%), followed by 10,851 Muslims (10.39%) and 1.22% following other religions, includes Sikhs (0.23%), Christians (0.13%), Buddhists (0.04%), Jains (0.01%) and not stated (0.81%).

== Culture/Cityscape ==
=== Dadri Mela (fair) ===
Dadri mela is the second largest cattle fair of India, which is held 5 km (3.1 mi) from Ballia, near NH 31 and 3 km (1.9 mi) from the bus station of Ballia city. The fair starts with people taking a holy dip in the river Ganges on the full moon of Kartik Poornima (October–November). This fair is held annually in the honour of Dardar Muni, the disciple of Maharishi Bhrigu.

This one-month-long fair is organised in two phases. The first phase starts ten days before the onset of Kartik Poornima, during which traders bring some excellent breeds of cattle from across India for sale/purchase. On or after Kartik Poornima, various cultural programs are organised and one can find here a large number of makeshift shops of various items during the next fortnight.

== Transportation ==
Ballia railway station caters to many trains daily including Special Vande Bharat Express and 2 Rajdhani Expresses. Train connectivity to major cities of India like Delhi, Mumbai, Kolkata, Chennai as well as to Lucknow, Kanpur, Aligarh, Agra, Bareilly, Varanasi and Allahabad via many trains is available.

Ballia is well connected to the state capital Lucknow and the cities of Gorakhpur, Kanpur, Agra, Varanasi, Bareilly and Allahabad by road. The state bus corporation UPSRTC is the primary road transport media.

== Education ==
=== Universities and colleges ===
The Jananayak Chandrashekhar University, Ballia is a state university established in 2016 by Government of Uttar Pradesh in Ballia, Uttar Pradesh.

=== Schools ===
- Jawahar Navodaya Vidyalaya, Ballia
- Kendriya Vidyalaya, Ballia
