= List of people from Ballia =

The following is a list of notable people from or related to the Ballia district of Uttar Pradesh, India

== Academics ==
- Brij Bihari Chaubey, Sanskrit and Vedic scholar, and a recipient of the Padma Shri.
- Ganesh Prasad, Indian mathematician who founded the Benares Mathematical Society and contributed to the theory of functions.
- Jagadish Shukla, meteorologist known for his work in climate dynamics and prediction.
- Ibrahim Balyawi, Indian Islamic scholar and theologian known for his work in Islamic jurisprudence.
- Rama Nath Sharma, Sanskrit scholar and professor who taught at the University of Hawaii.
- Surendra Nath Pandeya, scholar known for his work in the field of chemistry, particularly coordination chemistry.

== Activism, social work, and philanthropy ==
- Bhrigu, sage (Maharishi) in Hindu tradition, considered one of the seven great sages (Saptarishis).
- Jayaprakash Narayan, independence activist and recipient of the Bharat Ratna who led the "Total Revolution" movement.
- Chittu Pandey, independence activist who led the Quit India Movement in Ballia and established a temporary local government.
- Harihar Nath Shastri, freedom fighter and a key figure in the Indian trade union movement.
- Mangal Pandey, a sepoy whose actions were a precursor to the Indian Rebellion of 1857.
- Prasiddha Narayan Singh, freedom fighter and socialist leader from the region.
- Rabindra Nath Upadhyay, social worker and Padma Shri recipient, noted for his work in rural development.
- Raja Mohar Singh, freedom fighter who participated in the Indian independence movement.

== Art and literature ==
- Amarkant, writer of Hindi literature and a recipient of the Jnanpith Award.
- Atul Kumar Rai, novelist and screenwriter who received the Sahitya Akademi Yuva Puraskar.
- Baldev Upadhyaya, Sanskrit scholar and literary historian who wrote on the history of Sanskrit literature.
- Bulaki Das, saint and Bhojpuri poet whose devotional compositions are part of the region's folk traditions.
- Doodhnath Singh, Hindi language writer, critic, and poet.
- Hazari Prasad Dwivedi, Hindi novelist, literary historian, and critic.
- Kedar Nath Pandey, polymath known as a father of Hindi travel literature.
- Kedarnath Singh, modern Hindi poet, critic, and a recipient of the Jnanpith Award.
- Suryakumar Pandey, contemporary poet known for his work in Hindi poetry and satire.

== Film, television, and entertainment ==
- Kamlesh Pandey, Bollywood screenwriter known for films such as Rang De Basanti, Tezaab, and Delhi-6.
- Mushir-Riaz, Bollywood film producer duo known for films in the 1970s and 1980s.
- Neelam Giri, actress active in the Bhojpuri film industry.
- Siddhant Chaturvedi, Bollywood actor
- Yash Kumarr, actor and producer in Bhojpuri cinema.

== Journalism ==
- Manoj Prasad, journalist and correspondent for The Indian Express.

== Politics and government ==
=== Prime Ministers ===
- Chandra Shekhar, 8th Prime Minister of India (1990–91)

=== Union ministers & Members of Parliament ===
- Harivansh Narayan Singh, journalist and politician serving as the Deputy Chairman of the Rajya Sabha. (JD(U))
- Janeshwar Mishra, socialist leader who served as a Union Cabinet Minister in multiple governments. (Samajwadi Party)
- Murli Manohar, represented the Ballia Lok Sabha constituency in the 3rd Lok Sabha (1962–1967). (INC)
- Neeraj Shekhar, Member of Parliament in the Rajya Sabha and former Lok Sabha MP from Ballia. (BJP)
- Rajeev Rai, Member of Parliament for the Ghosi Lok Sabha constituency, elected in 2024. (Samajwadi Party)
- Virendra Singh Mast, multi-term Member of Parliament who represented Ballia in the 17th Lok Sabha. (BJP)
- Bharat Singh, represented the Ballia constituency in the 16th Lok Sabha and has also served as an MLA. (BJP)
- Gulam Rasool Balyawi, has served as a Member of Parliament in the Rajya Sabha from Bihar. (JD(U))
- Chandrika Prasad, politician who served as a Member of Parliament from the region.

=== State ministers & Members of Legislative Assembly (Uttar Pradesh) ===
- Daya Shankar Singh, Minister of Transport in the Government of Uttar Pradesh. (BJP)
- Upendra Tiwari, served as a Minister of State in the first Yogi Adityanath ministry. (BJP)
- Bacha Pathak, politician who served twice as a Cabinet Minister in the Uttar Pradesh Government. (INC)
- Ram Govind Chaudhary, politician served as the Leader of the Opposition in the UP Legislative Assembly. (Samajwadi Party)
- Manager Singh, politician elected five times as the MLA from the Doaba constituency.
- Umashankar Singh, represented the Rasara constituency as a Member of the Legislative Assembly. (BSP)

=== Civil services ===
- Abul Hasan Quraishi, officer from the 1933 batch of the Indian Civil Service (ICS).
- Manzoor Alam Quraishi, officer of the Indian Civil Service (ICS) noted for his work in administration and agricultural development.
- Kinjal Singh, Indian Administrative Service (IAS) officer.
- Gyan Prakash Upadhyaya, Indian Administrative Service (IAS) officer.
