= Katghara =

Katghara may refer to:

- Katghara, Deoria, Uttar Pradesh, India
- Katghara, Jaunpur, Uttar Pradesh, India
