= Premraja =

Village in Ballia, Uttar Pradesh, India

Premraja is a small village with a population of around 500, located in the Ballia district of Uttar Pradesh state, India. Its political location is such that it lies very near to the borders of four districts of UP named Mau, Azamgarh, Ballia and Deoria. It is almost 1.5 km east to the native village, Ibrahimpatti, of former Indian Prime Minister Late Shri Chandra Shekhar (Singh).

This village is part of Siuri-Premraja Grampanchayat. Mostly dominated by Brahmins of Mishra and Pandey families. The Brahmins of this village are said to have migrated from Basti, a District of U.P. itself. The nearest railway station is Kirihirapur (8 km away from the village) with headquarters in North Eastern Railways Subdivision (NER, Gorakhpur). The nearest large markets are Madhuban, and Belthara Road. Although several small markets are also there, like Ibrahimpatti, Maryadpur, Katghara, Fatehpur and Channapar, people generally move to larger markets for good bargains.

The major livelihood is agriculture and farming. The soil is very fertile and well irrigated through a canal which receives water from nearby Sarayu river.

Many people from this village have shifted to different part of India, mainly to metropolitan areas, for a better livelihood. On the other hand, some of the persons have served or are serving India at different fronts. Some notable persons who have served the nation in various capacities are Late Chandra Bhushan Mishra (Ex-SDM Azamgarh), Late Dr. Sangram Bhushan Mishra (Asso Professor, Maths, Satish Chandra College, Ballia and Ex- District President BJP, Ballia), Shri Manish K Mishra (Scientist, BARC, Mumbai) This village came into limelight after an incident which shook the state. The incident which took life of Shri Atal Bihari Mishra (who was allegedly mercilessly beaten to death by U.P. state police). Atal ji was always ready for the support of the village and wanted to develop the village, but the police did not leave him and made his victim [6] from the village
