= Bharat Singh =

Indian politician

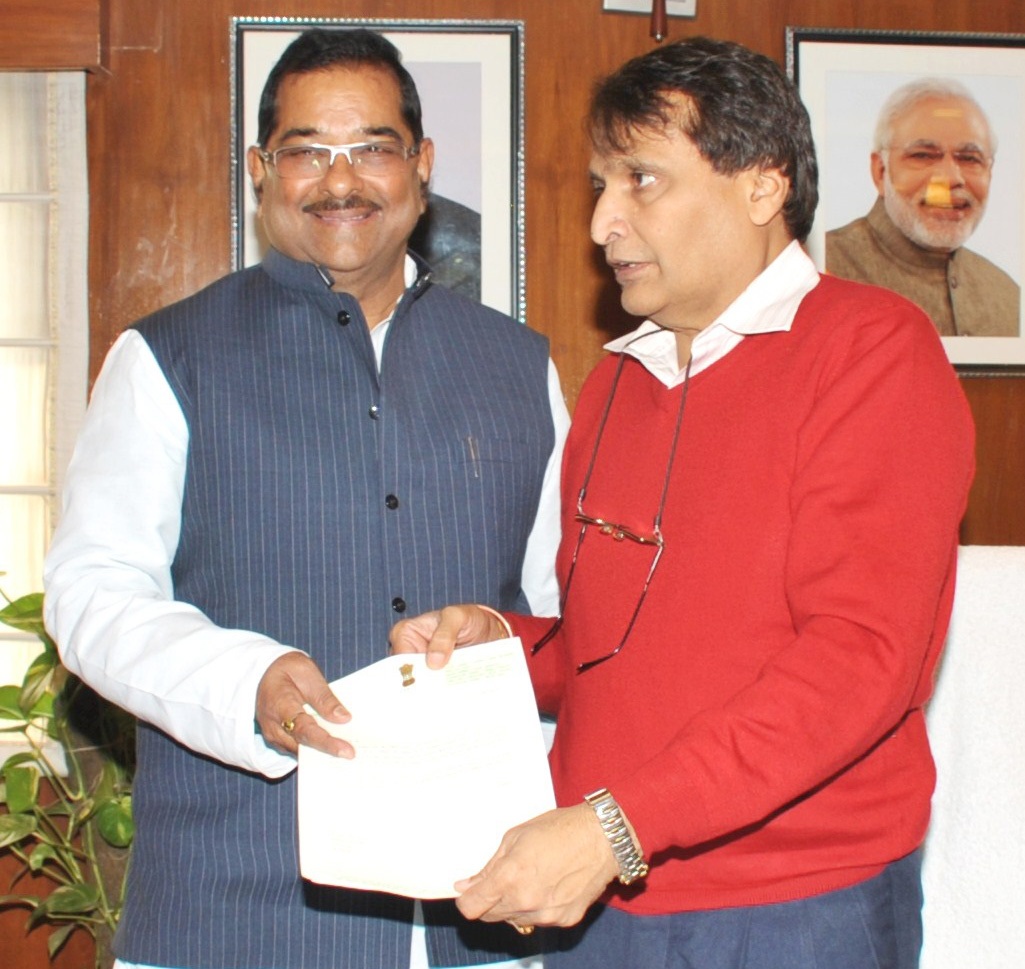

Member of Parliament, Lok Sabha
- In office 2014–2019
- Preceded by: Neeraj Shekhar
- Succeeded by: Virendra Singh Mast
- Constituency: Ballia

Member of Uttar Pradesh Legislative Assembly
- In office 1996–2007
- Preceded by: Bikram Singh
- Succeeded by: Subhash Yadav
- Constituency: Doaba
- In office 1991–1992
- Preceded by: Bhola Nath
- Succeeded by: Bikram Singh
- Constituency: Doaba

Personal details
- Born: 15 September 1948 (age 78) Nawka Tola, Ballia, Uttar Pradesh, India
- Party: Bharatiya Janata Party
- Spouse: Sheela Singh (m. 1972)
- Children: 1 Daughter
- Parents: Ramcheej Singh (father); Ramswaro Devi (mother)
- Education: Jodhpur University, Banaras Hindu University
- Profession: Agriculturist, Politician

Bharat Singh is an Indian politician and a former Member of Parliament, Lok Sabha from the Ballia (Lok Sabha constituency). He is member of the Bharatiya Janata Party. He won the 2014 Indian general elections from the Ballia Lok Sabha constituency by defeating former Prime Minister Chandra Shekhar's son Neeraj Shekhar by 139,434 votes.

== Early life ==
Bharat Singh was born on 15 September 1948 in the village Navka Tola in Bairiya tehsil of Ballia district in Uttar Pradesh. His father Ramcheej Singh was a farmer. Bharat Singh got his early education at his native village and went on to complete his graduation from Jodhpur University, Rajasthan in 1973. Bharat Singh joined politics when he was a student of Banaras Hindu University. He got elected as President of Banaras Hindu University Students' Union in 1978.

== Political career ==
Bharat Singh won the Uttar Pradesh Assembly elections of 1991, 1996 and 2002 from Bairiya assembly seat in Ballia as a Member of Legislative Assembly (MLA). He ran in the Lok Sabha election of 2014 from Ballia as Bharatiya Janata Party candidate and defeated the sitting MP Neeraj Shekhar.

== Posts held ==
- General Secretary of Banaras Hindu University Students' Union, 1975
- President of Banaras Hindu University Students' Union, 1978
- Member of Legislative Assembly (MLA), Uttar Pradesh, 1991
- .MLA, Uttar Pradesh, 1996
- MLA, Uttar Pradesh, 2002
- Member of Parliament, Lok Sabha, Ballia (Lok Sabha constituency), 2014
