= Ballia Lok Sabha constituency =

Lok Sabha Constituency in Uttar Pradesh

Coordinates: 25.76°N 84.15°E

Ballia UP-72
- Lok Sabha constituency
- Interactive Map Outlining Ballia Lok Sabha constituency

Constituency details
- Country: India
- Region: North India
- State: Uttar Pradesh
- Assembly constituencies: Phephana; Ballia Nagar; Bairia; Zahoorabad; Mohammadabad
- Established: 1952
- Reservation: None

Member of Parliament
- 18th Lok Sabha
- Incumbent Sanatan Pandey
- Party: SP
- Alliance: I.N.D.I.A.
- Elected year: 2024
- Preceded by: Virendra Singh Mast, BJP

Ballia is one of the 80 Lok Sabha (parliamentary) constituencies in Uttar Pradesh in India.

== Assembly segments ==
Presently, Ballia Lok Sabha constituency comprises five Vidhan Sabha (legislative assembly) segments. These are:

No	Name	District	Member	Party	2024 Lead
360	Phephana	Ballia	Sangram Singh	SP	SP
361	Ballia Nagar	Ballia	Daya Shankar Singh	BJP	BJP
363	Bairia	Ballia	Jai Prakash Anchal	SP	SP
377	Zahoorabad	Ghazipur	Om Prakash Rajbhar	SBSP	SP
378	Mohammadabad	Ghazipur	Mannu Ansari	SP	SP

== Members of Parliament ==
Year	Member	Party
1952	Ram Nagina Singh	Socialist Party
1957	Radha Mohan Singh	Indian National Congress
1962	Murli Manohar	Indian National Congress
1967	Chandrika Prasad	Indian National Congress
1971	Chandrika Prasad	Indian National Congress
1977	Chandra Shekhar	Janata Party
1980	Chandra Shekhar	Janata Party
1984	Jagannath Chowdhary	Indian National Congress
1989	Chandra Shekhar	Janata Dal
1991	Chandra Shekhar	Samajwadi Janata Party
1996	Chandra Shekhar	Samajwadi Janata Party
1998	Chandra Shekhar	Samajwadi Janata Party
1999	Chandra Shekhar	Samajwadi Janata Party
2004	Chandra Shekhar	Samajwadi Janata Party
2008^	Neeraj Shekhar	Samajwadi Party
2009	Neeraj Shekhar	Samajwadi Party
2014	Bharat Singh	Bharatiya Janata Party
2019	Virendra Singh Mast	Bharatiya Janata Party
2024	Sanatan Pandey	Samajwadi Party

^ by poll

== Election results ==
Vote share of Winning candidates
2024	46.37%
2019	47.40%
2014	38.18%
2009	40.83%
2008 (by-poll)	54.60%
2004	43.59%
1999	38.62%
1998	41.01%
1996	56.94%
1991	46.52%
1989	52.53%
1984	52.60%
1980	41.37%
1977	72.42%
1971	64.81%
1967	26.65%
1962	50.13%
1957	51.79%
1952	37.74%

=== 2024 ===
2024 Indian general elections: Ballia
Party	Candidate	Votes	%	±%
SP	Sanatan Pandey	467,068	46.37	▲0.54
BJP	Neeraj Shekhar	423,684	42.06	▼5.34
BSP	Lallan Singh Yadav	85,205	8.46	▲8.46
NOTA	None of the Above	8,187	0.81	▼0.16
Majority		43,384	4.30	▲2.73
Turnout		10,07,322	52.37	▼1.98
SP gain from BJP		Swing		

=== 2019 ===
2019 Indian general elections: Ballia
Party	Candidate	Votes	%	±%
BJP	Virendra Singh Mast	469,114	47.40	+9.22
SP	Sanatan Pandey	4,53,595	45.83	+22.45
SBSP	Vinod	35,900	3.63	
NOTA	None of the above	9,615	0.97	
Majority		15,519	1.57	−13.23
Turnout		9,90,571	54.35	
BJP hold		Swing		

=== 2014 ===
2014 Indian general elections: Ballia
Party	Candidate	Votes	%	±%
BJP	Bharat Singh	359,760	38.18	
SP	Neeraj Shekhar	2,20,324	23.38	
QED	Afzal Ansari	1,63,943	17.40	
BSP	Virendra Kumar Pathak	1,41,684	15.04	
INC	Sudha Rai	13,501	1.43	
NOTA	None of the above	6,670	0.71	
Majority		1,39,434	14.80	
Turnout		9,42,275	53.29	
BJP gain from SP		Swing		

=== 2009 ===
2009 Indian general elections: Ballia
Party	Candidate	Votes	%	±%
SP	Neeraj Shekhar	276,649	40.83	
BSP	Sangram Singh Yadav	2,04,094	30.12	
BJP	Manoj Sinha	1,37,740	20.31	
SBSP	Ramshakal	25,865	3.81	
Majority		72,555	10.61	
Turnout		6,77,729	40.36	
SP hold		Swing		

=== 2008 by-election ===
2008 Ballia Lok Sabha by-election
Party	Candidate	Votes	%	±%
SP	Neeraj Shekhar	295,736	54.60	
BSP	Vinay Shankar Tiwari	164,450	30.36	
BJP	Virendra Singh Mast	22,723	4.20	
SBSP	Dr. Uma Shankar Nishad	21,449	3.96	
INC	Rajeev Upadhyay	10,755	1.99	
IND	6 Independent Candidates	12,756	2.36	
OTH	5 Other Party Candidates	13,745	2.54	
Majority		131,286	24.24	
Turnout		541,620	35.61	
Swing to SP from SJP(R)		Swing		

=== 2004 ===
2004 Indian general election: Ballia
Party	Candidate	Votes	%	±%
SJP(R)	Chandra Shekhar	270,136	43.59	
BSP	Kapildeo Yadav	189,082	30.51	
BJP	Parmatma Nand Tiwari	109,499	17.67	
SBSP	Om Prakash	28,266	4.56	
IND	7 Independent Candidates	12,353	1.99	
OTH	4 Other Party Candidates	10,426	1.68	
Majority		81,054	13.08	
Turnout		619,531	43.30	
SJP(R) hold		Swing		

=== 1999 ===
1999 Indian general election: Ballia
Party	Candidate	Votes	%	±%
SJP(R)	Chandra Shekhar	235,946	38.62	
BJP	Ram Krishna Gopal	180,271	29.51	
BSP	Ram Deo Verma	142,647	23.35	
INC	Digvijay	36,477	5.97	
AD	Deo Nath Rajbhar	5,607	0.92	
IND	5 Independent Candidates	9,976	1.62	
Majority		55,675	9.11	
Turnout		619,524	48.11	
SJP(R) hold		Swing		

=== 1998 ===
1998 Indian general election: Ballia
Party	Candidate	Votes	%	±%
SJP(R)	Chandra Shekhar	260,544	41.01	
BJP	Ram Krishna urf Gopal	231,060	36.37	
BSP	Col. Bharat Singh	96,884	15.25	
INC	Jagannath Chowdhary	33,764	5.31	
IND	8 Independent Candidates	13,085	2.05	
Majority		29,484	4.64	
Turnout		642,535	49.89	
Swing to SJP(R) from SAP		Swing		

=== 1996 ===
1996 Indian general election: Ballia
Party	Candidate	Votes	%	±%
SJP(R)	Chandra Shekhar	305,592	56.94	
INC	Jagannath Chowdhary	118,987	22.17	
BSP	Rajendra Rajbhar	70,366	13.11	
JD	Dharmanand Tiwari	7,399	1.38	
IND	32 Independent Candidates	31,481	5.87	
OTH	3 Other Party Candidates	2,880	0.54	
Majority		186,605	34.77	
Turnout		541,957	42.47	
Swing to SAP from JP		Swing		

=== 1991 ===
1991 Indian general election: Ballia
Party	Candidate	Votes	%	±%
SJP(R)	Chandra Shekhar	213,066	46.52	
INC	Jagannath Chowdhary	154,518	33.74	
BSP	Rajendra	34,781	7.59	
BJP	Sheo Kumar Rai Vakeel	34,581	7.55	
IND	14 Independent Candidates	17,122	3.75	
OTH	3 Other Party Candidates	3,929	0.86	
Majority		58,548	12.78	
Turnout		476,635	47.49	
Swing to JP from JD		Swing		

=== 1989 ===
1989 Indian general election: Ballia
Party	Candidate	Votes	%	±%
JD	Chandra Shekhar	251,997	52.53	
INC	Jagannath Chowdhary	161,016	33.57	
BSP	Indra Deo	46,913	9.78	
IND	7 Independent Candidates	13,069	2.72	
OTH	3 Other Party Candidates	6,709	1.40	
Majority		90,981	18.96	
Turnout		499,485	50.55	
Swing to JD from INC		Swing		

=== 1984 ===
1984 Indian general election: Ballia
Party	Candidate	Votes	%	±%
INC	Jagannath Chowdhary	225,984	52.60	
JP	Chandra Shekhar	172,044	40.04	
DDP	Babban Verma	2,956	0.69	
IND	9 Independent Candidates	28,662	6.68	
Majority		53,940	12.56	
Turnout		438,137	55.09	
Swing to INC from JP		Swing		

=== 1980 ===
1980 Indian general election: Ballia
Party	Candidate	Votes	%	±%
JP	Chandra Shekhar	159,901	41.37	
INC(I)	Jagannath Chowdhary	136,313	35.27	
JP(S)	Janeshwar Mishra	73,661	19.06	
INC(U)	Chandrika Prasad	7,216	1.87	
IND	Kailash	3,731	0.97	
IND	Gulabchand	3,145	0.81	
IND	Bhagwanji Singh	1,701	0.44	
IND	Omkar Nath	829	0.21	
Majority		23,588	6.10	
Turnout		394,280	52.54	
JP hold		Swing		

=== 1977 ===
1977 Indian general election: Ballia
Party	Candidate	Votes	%	±%
JP	Chandra Shekhar	262,641	72.42	
INC	Chandrika Prasad	95,423	26.31	
IND	Onkar Nath	4,599	1.27	
Majority		167,218	46.11	
Turnout		369,791	55.93	
Swing to JP from INC		Swing		

=== 1971 ===
1971 Indian general election: Ballia
Party	Candidate	Votes	%	±%
INC	Chandrika Prasad	167,724	64.81	
INC(O)	Sheodutt	50,207	19.40	
BKD	Shambhu Nath	22,323	8.63	
PSP	Ram Vichar	6,111	2.36	
IND	Ram Sarikha	5,616	2.17	
IND	Abhai Narain Ram	3,771	1.46	
IND	Indradeo	3,029	1.17	
Majority		117,517	45.41	
Turnout		263,023	45.66	
INC hold		Swing		

=== 1967 ===
1967 Indian general election: Ballia
Party	Candidate	Votes	%	±%
INC	Chandrika Prasad	64,643	26.65	
SSP	Rameshwar	44,930	18.52	
ABJS	K. Nath	39,852	16.43	
IND	R. Ratan	26,373	10.87	
IND	B. Nand	12,766	5.26	
IND	Chandradeo	12,641	5.21	
IND	K. Prasad	9,889	4.08	
SWA	P. Narain	8,742	3.60	
IND	Prabhunath	6,206	2.56	
IND	P. Nand	5,036	2.08	
IND	R. Govind	4,361	1.80	
IND	Algu	4,056	1.67	
IND	L. Bahadur	3,110	1.28	
Majority		19,713	8.13	
Turnout		255,547	50.69	
INC hold		Swing		

=== 1962 ===
1962 Indian general election: Ballia
Party	Candidate	Votes	%	±%
INC	Murli Manohar	106,245	50.13	
PSP	Baijnath	70,452	33.24	
Socialist	Adhatam	24,359	11.49	
ABJS	Raj Narayan	10,873	5.13	
Majority		35,793	16.89	
Turnout		219,215	51.50	
INC hold		Swing		

=== 1957 ===
1957 Indian general election: Ballia
Party	Candidate	Votes	%	±%
INC	Radha Mohan	96,501	51.79	
PSP	Ram Nagina	50,706	27.21	
CPI	Kapil Deo	39,136	21.00	
Majority		45,795	24.58	
Turnout		186,343	46.33	
Swing to INC from Socialist		Swing		

=== 1952 ===
1951–52 Indian general election: Ghazipur District (East) cum Ballia District South (West)
Party	Candidate	Votes	%	±%
Socialist	Ram Nagina	44,195	37.74	
INC	Krishna Nand	43,793	37.39	
RSP(UP)	Lakshmi Shanker	13,601	11.61	
IND	Param Hans	9,103	7.77	
RRP	Shiva Kumar Rai	6,423	5.48	
Majority		402	0.35	
Turnout		117,115	32.45	
Socialist win (new seat)				

== See also ==
- Ballia district
- List of constituencies of the Lok Sabha

== Notes ==
Lok Sabha
Preceded by Fatehpur	Constituency represented by the prime minister 1990–1991	Succeeded by Nandyal
