= Sanatan Pandey =

Indian politician

Member of Parliament, Lok Sabha
- Incumbent
- Assumed office 4 June 2024
- Preceded by: Virendra Singh Mast
- Constituency: Ballia

15th Uttar Pradesh Assembly
- In office 2007–2012
- Constituency: chilkahar

Personal details
- Party: Samajwadi Party
- Parent: Ramji Pandey (father)
- Occupation: Politician

Sanatan Pandey is an Indian politician and a member of the lower house of Indian Parliament, the Lok Sabha. He is affiliated with the Samajwadi Party.

== Political career ==
Pandey was elected in 2024 as a Member of Parliament from Ballia Lok Sabha constituency. He defeated Neeraj Shekhar of Bharatiya Janta Party by 43,801 votes.
