= Laxmi Singh =

Indian police officer

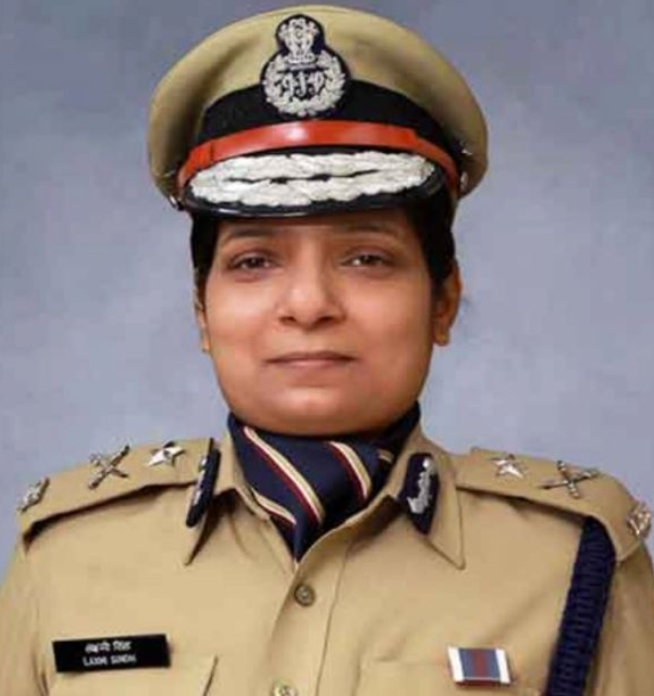
- Born: 2 May 1974 (age 51); Lucknow, India
- Citizenship: India
- Education: B.Tech. (Mechanical Engineering), MA (Sociology)
- Alma mater: Institute of Engineering and Technology, University of Lucknow
- Occupations: Inspector General (IG) of Police, Uttar Pradesh
- Years active: 2000–present
- Employer: Government of India
- Organization: Indian Police Service
- Spouse: Rajeshwar Singh
- Children: 1
- Father: I. D. Singh
- Awards: Received the silver baton from Prime Minister, Rewarded by Prime Minister for her contribution to bringing computerization to the police system, Received a 9 mm pistol as a prize from the Union Home Ministry
- Honours: Honoured with the Chief Minister's Excellence Service Police Medal

Laxmi Singh (born 2 May 1974) is a 2000 batch IPS officer of Uttar Pradesh cadre, who is currently serving as the Inspector General (IG) of Uttar Pradesh Police. She became the first woman police commissioner of Uttar Pradesh on 28 November 2022.

== Early life and education ==
Singh was born on 2 May 1974 to I. D. Singh at Lucknow district in Uttar Pradesh. She did her schooling from Loreto Convent, Lucknow. She received her B.Tech. in Mechanical Engineering from University of Lucknow's Institute of Engineering and Technology and was gold medalist. She also gained an M.A. in Sociology.

== Personal life ==
Singh is married to Rajeshwar Singh, an MLA from Sarojini Nagar Assembly constituency of Lucknow district, with whom she has a daughter. Rajeshwar Singh was also an IPS officer and was retired as joint director of Enforcement Directorate.

== Career ==
Singh joined the Indian Police Service in 2000. In 2004, she was promoted to the rank of Senior Superintendent of Police. She was posted as Deputy Inspector General of Police (DIG) in 2013, as Inspector General of Police (IG) in 2018.

Singh has previously served as the IG/DIG of the Special Task Force (STF) in Gautam Buddha Nagar from 1 January 2018 to 5 March 2018. Thereafter, she was made IG of the police training school in Meerut from March 2018 to 26 May 2020 before being moved as IG Range Lucknow.

On 28 November 2022, she was appointed as the police commissioner of Gautam Buddh Nagar (Noida), becoming the first woman police commissioner in Uttar Pradesh.
