= Koth =

Koth or KOTH may refer to:

- Koth, Ahmedabad, a village in the Ahmadabad district of Gujarat, India
- Koth, Ballia, a village in the Ballia district of Uttar Pradesh, India
- Koth (Conan), a nation in the fictional world of Conan the Barbarian
- King of the Hill, an American animated sitcom
  - King of the Hill (disambiguation), other uses of the term
- Southwest Oregon Regional Airport (ICAO code: KOTH), a public airport located in the city of North Bend, in Coos County, Oregon, USA
- The German soprano Erika Köth
- Koth of the Hammer, a planeswalker in the collectible card game Magic: The Gathering
- Sign of Koth, an element of the Cthulhu Mythos
- Janet Koth, American reality show contestant
