= Ram Nagina Singh =

Member of Parliament, Lok Sabha
- In office 1952–1957
- Succeeded by: Radha Mohan Singh
- Constituency: Ghazipur Distt. (East) cum Ballia Distt. (South-West)

Personal details
- Born: 1916 Katharia, Ballia, United Provinces, British India
- Party: Praja Socialist Party
- Spouse: Jhuna Devi

Ram Nagina Singh was an Indian politician. He was elected to the Lok Sabha, the lower house of the Parliament of India from the Ghazipur Distt. (East) cum Ballia Distt. (South-West) constituency of Uttar Pradesh as a member of the Praja Socialist Party.
