= Maurha =

Maurha Estate
- Taluqdar of British India
- c. 1894–1948
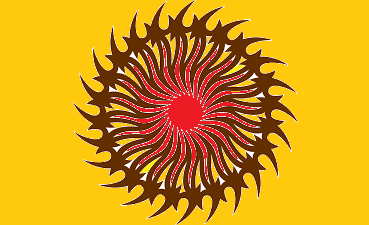
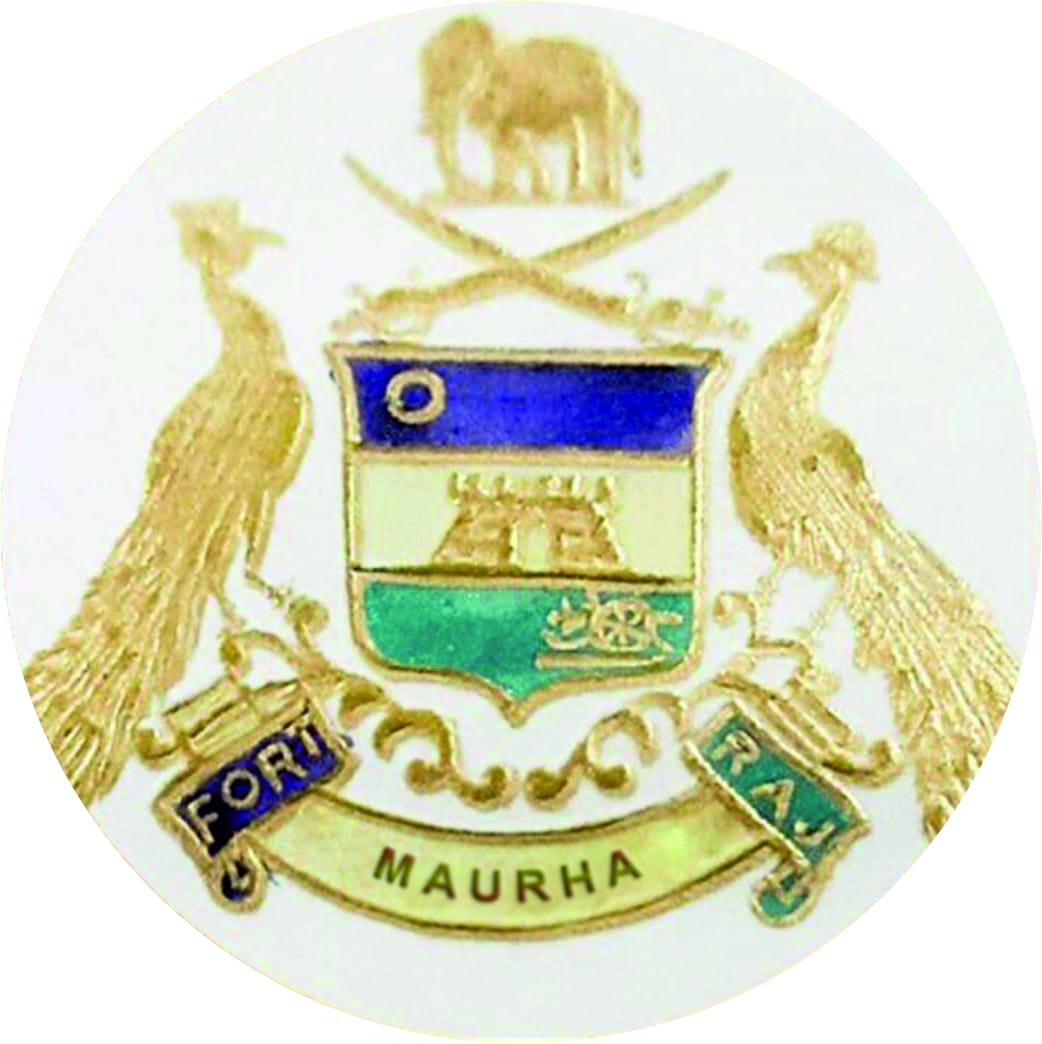
- Flag Coat of arms
- History
  - Established: c. 1894
  - Independence of India: 1948
Succeeded by
India
- Today part of: India

Maurha
- Village
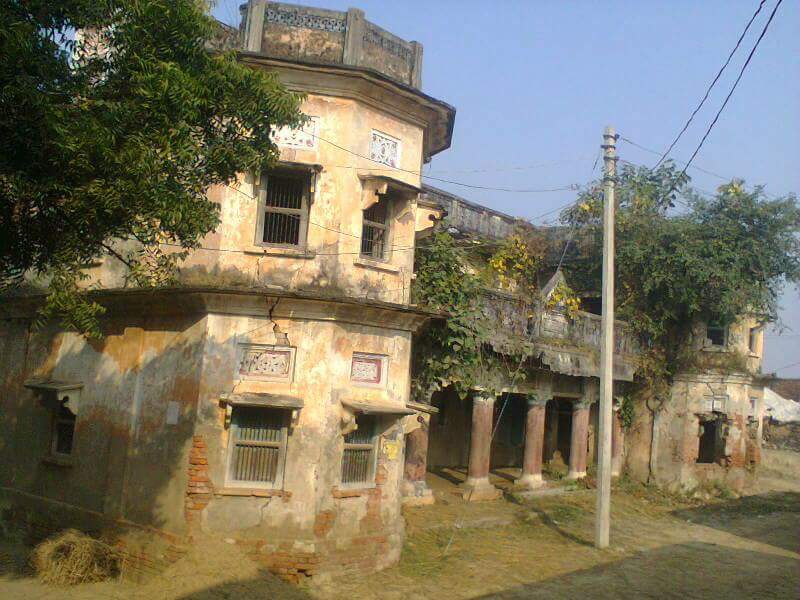
- Maurha Fort

- Location in Uttar Pradesh, India Maurha (India)
- Coordinates: 26.053624°N 83.918529°E
- Country: India
- State: Uttar Pradesh
- District: Ballia
- Founder: Raja Mohar Singh

Government
  - Body: Gram panchayat

Population (2011)
  - Total: 555

Languages
  - Official: Hindi and Bhojpuri
- Time zone: UTC+5:30 (IST)
- PIN: 221718
- Vehicle registration: UP
- Website: up.gov.in

Religions in Maurha
Religion	Percent
Hindus	99.10%
Muslims	00.90%

Maurha is a village and a Gram panchayat in Ballia district in the Indian state of Uttar Pradesh. Its population is 555, per the 2011 Census. Maurha's nearest railway station is Belthara Road. During British India it was a Taluqdari

Maurha has an ancient temple of Lord Shiva on its outskirts, which is believed to have been constructed in the 16th century AD.
