= Jagannath Chowdhary =

Indian politician (1925–1999)

Member of Parliament, Lok Sabha
- In office 1984–1989
- Preceded by: Chandra Sekhar
- Succeeded by: Chandra Sekhar
- Constituency: Ballia

Personal details
- Born: 1 January 1925 Kathora, Ballia, United Provinces, British India
- Died: 31 December 1999 (aged 74) Ballia, Uttar Pradesh, India
- Party: Indian National Congress
- Spouse: Sinhasini Devi
- Children: 2 sons and daughters

Jagannath Chowdhary (1 January 1925 – 31 December 1999) was an Indian politician. He was elected to the Lok Sabha, the lower house of the Parliament of India from the Ballia constituency of Uttar Pradesh in 1984 as a member of the Indian National Congress defeating Chandra Sekhar.

Chowdhary died in Ballia, Uttar Pradesh on 31 December 1999, a day before his 75th birthday.
