= Rajeshwar Singh =

Indian politician

Member of the Uttar Pradesh Legislative Assembly
- Incumbent
- Assumed office 10 March 2022
- Preceded by: Swati Singh
- Constituency: Sarojini Nagar

Personal details
- Born: 11 March 1973 (age 53) Lucknow, Uttar Pradesh, India
- Party: Bharatiya Janata Party
- Spouse: Laxmi Singh
- Children: 1
- Education: Uttar Pradesh Rajarshi Tandon Open University, (PhD, 2011); Indian School of Mines, Dhanbad (B. Tech)
- Occupation: Police officer; politician

Rajeshwar Singh (born 11 March 1973) is an Indian politician and a member of the 18th Legislative Assembly of Uttar Pradesh representing Sarojini Nagar constituency of Lucknow district. He is a member of the Bharatiya Janata Party. Singh is a former joint director of the Enforcement Directorate.

== Personal life ==
Singh was born on 11 March 1973 in Lucknow in the family of Ran Bahadur Singh, a deputy inspector general of police (DIG). A graduate from the Colvin Taluqdars' College in Lucknow, he completed his B. Tech from Indian School of Mines, Dhanbad and a PhD from Uttar Pradesh Rajarshi Tandon Open University in 2011. Singh is married to Laxmi Singh, an IPS officer, with whom he has a daughter.

== Career ==
An officer of the Uttar Pradesh Police (Provincial Police Service) since the last 14 years, Singh took a voluntary retirement from the post of the Joint Director of Enforcement Directorate on 31 January 2022 to join politics.

In the 2022 Uttar Pradesh Legislative Assembly election, Singh represented Bharatiya Janata Party as a candidate from Sarojini Nagar and went on to defeat Samajwadi Party's Abhishek Mishra by a margin of 56,186 votes, succeeding own party member and incumbent Swati Singh in the process.

== Other ventures ==
Singh portrayed Rajeshwar Singh in the 2011 Hindi film Kya Yahi Sach Hai, which talked about corruption within the police force and the politician-police nexus.
