= King of the Mountain =

King of the Mountain may refer to:

== Games ==
- King of the mountain (children's game), a playground game also known as king of the hill
- King of the Mountain (board game), a 1980 board game

== Film and television ==
- King of the Mountain, alternative title for Beyond the Summit, a 2018 Russian film starring Vladimir Vdovichenkov
- King of the Mountain (film), a 1981 film starring Harry Hamlin
- The King of the Mountain (film), a 2007 Spanish thriller

== Music ==
- "King of the Mountain" (Kate Bush song), 2005
- "King of the Mountain" (George Strait song), 1996
- "King of the Mountain" (Midnight Oil song), 1990
- "King of the Mountain", a song by Bon Jovi from 7800° Fahrenheit
- "King of the Mountain", a song by Kiss from Asylum
- King of the Mountains, an album by Rodney Carrington

== Sport ==
- King of the Mountain (race), an annual mountain race in Pomona, Queensland, Australia
- King of the Mountain match, a professional wrestling match
- King of the Mountains, a title given to the best climber in a cycling road race
- Peter Brock or "King of the Mountain" (1945–2006), Australian motor racing driver
- Jeff Jarrett or "The King of the Mountain" (born 1967), American professional wrestler

== Literature ==
- The King of the Mountains (Le Roi des montagnes), a 19th-century novel by Edmond About

== See also ==
- King asleep in mountain, a motif in folklore and mythology
- King Under the Mountain, a title for the ruler of Erebor in J.R.R. Tolkien's legendarium
- King of the Hill (disambiguation)
