= Ballia Nagar Assembly constituency =

Constituency of the Uttar Pradesh legislative assembly in India

Coordinates: 25.76°N 84.14°E

Ballia Nagar
- Constituency No. 361 for the Uttar Pradesh Legislative Assembly

Constituency details
- Country: India
- Region: North India
- State: Uttar Pradesh
- District: Ballia
- Reservation: None

Member of Legislative Assembly
- 18th Uttar Pradesh Legislative Assembly
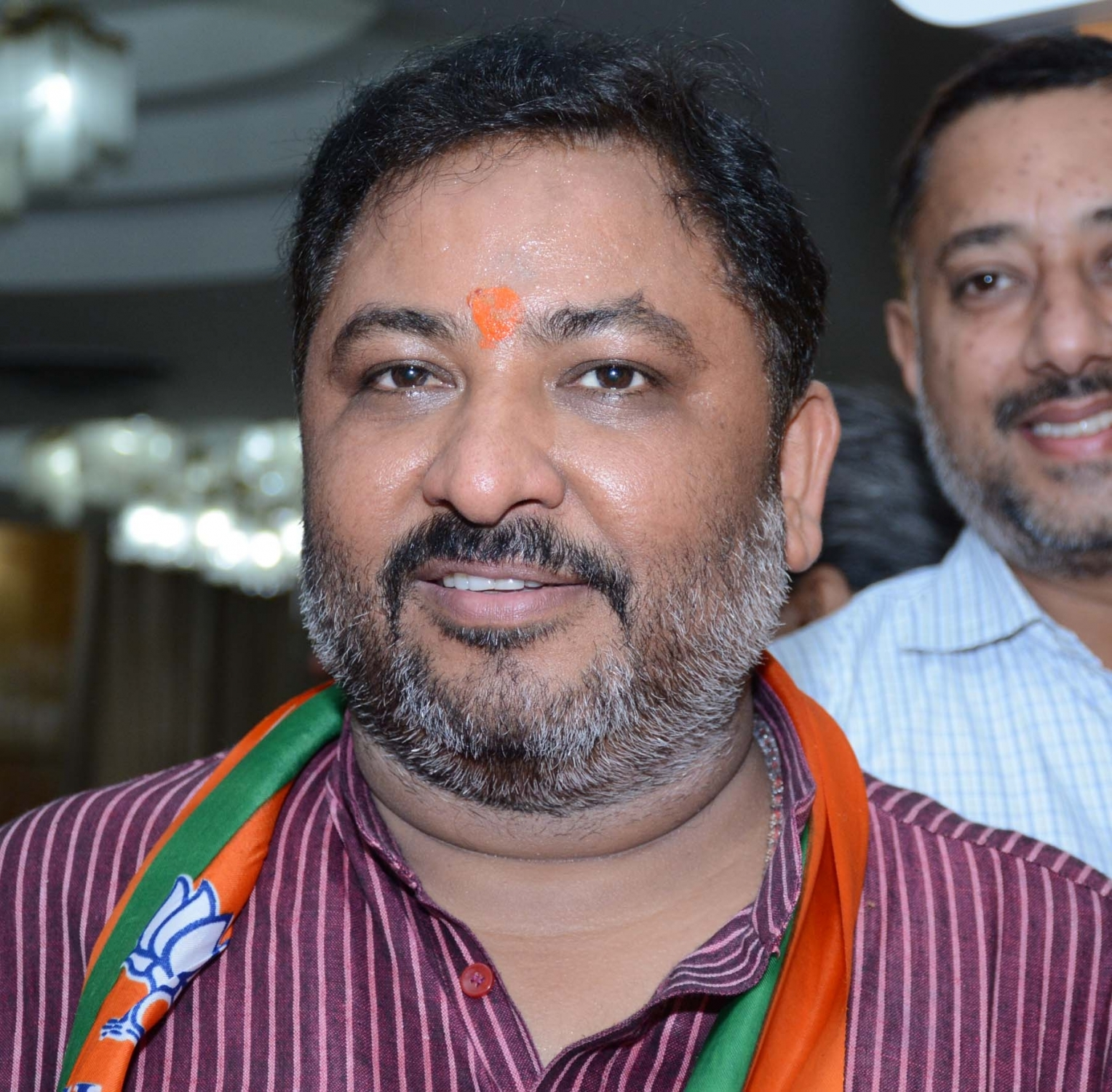
- Incumbent Daya Shankar Singh
- Party: BJP
- Alliance: NDA
- Elected year: 2022
- Preceded by: Anand Swarup Shukla, BJP

Ballia Nagar is a constituency of the Uttar Pradesh Legislative Assembly covering the city of Ballia Nagar in the Ballia district of Uttar Pradesh, India. It is one of five assembly constituencies in the Ballia Lok Sabha constituency. Since 2008, this assembly constituency has been numbered 361 out of 403 constituencies.

== Members of Legislative Assembly ==
Year	Member	Party
Till 2012 : Constituency did not exist
2012	Narad Rai	Samajwadi Party
2017	Anand Swarup Shukla	Bharatiya Janata Party
2022	Daya Shankar Singh	Bharatiya Janata Party

== Election results ==
=== 2027 ===
2027 Uttar Pradesh Legislative Assembly election: Ballia Nagar
Party	Candidate	Votes	%	±%
INDIA				
NDA				
BSP				
NOTA	None of the above			
Majority				
Turnout				
gain from		Swing		

=== 2022 ===
2022 Uttar Pradesh Legislative Assembly election: Ballia Nagar
Party	Candidate	Votes	%	±%
BJP	Daya Shankar Singh	103,873	51.22	▲1.26
SP	Narad Rai	77,634	38.28	▲9.84
BSP	Shivdas Prasad Verma	10,023	4.94	▼12.01
VIP	Jitendra Tiwari	3,872	1.91	
INC	Omprakash	2,166	1.07	
NOTA	None of the above	1,054	0.52	▼0.41
Majority		26,239	12.94	▼8.58
Turnout		202,812	54.04	▲2.12
BJP hold		Swing	-	

=== 2017 ===
Bharatiya Janta Party member Anand Swaroop Shukla was the MLA, who won in the 2017 Uttar Pradesh Legislative Elections, defeating Samajwadi Party candidate Laxman by a margin of 40,011 votes.

2017 Uttar Pradesh Legislative Assembly election: Ballia Nagar
Party	Candidate	Votes	%	±%
BJP	Anand Swarup Shukla	92,889	49.96	
SP	Laxman	52,878	28.44	
BSP	Narad Rai	31,515	16.95	
NOTA	None of the above	1,716	0.93	
Majority		40,011	21.52	
Turnout		185,942	51.92	
BJP gain from SP		Swing		
