= Swati Singh =

Indian politician from Uttar Pradesh (born 1978)

Minister of State (Ind. Charge) in Government of Uttar Pradesh
- In office 19 March 2017 – 12 March 2022

Member of Legislative Assembly
- In office 18 March 2017 – 12 March 2022
- Preceded by: Sharda Pratap Shukla
- Succeeded by: Rajeshwar Singh
- Constituency: Sarojini Nagar

President of BJP Mahila Morcha, Uttar Pradesh
- In office October 2016 – February 10, 2018
- Preceded by: Darshana Singh
- Constituency: Uttar Pradesh

Personal details
- Born: 1 August 1978 (age 48) Bokaro, Jharkhand, India
- Party: Bharatiya Janata Party
- Spouse: Daya Shankar Singh (m:2001;-div:2023;)
- Children: 2
- Education: University of Lucknow (LLM)
- Profession: Business, politician

Swati Singh (born 1 August 1978) is an Indian politician and Minister of State (Independent Charge) for Women Welfare NRI, Flood Control, Agriculture Export, Agriculture Marketing, Agriculture Foreign Trade and state minister in the Ministry of Women Welfare, Family Welfare, Maternity and Child Welfare in the Government of Uttar Pradesh.

== Education ==
- M.M.S. in 2001 from University of Allahabad
- L.L.M. in 2007 from the University of Lucknow

== Political life ==
She came in an active field of politics after her husband Daya Shankar Singh got expelled from the post of vice-president of Bhartiya Janta Party for six years after a comment on BSP Chief Mayawati in a public meeting in September 2016. On 12 March 2017, the BJP revoked her husband's expulsion.

In 2017, she got elected as Member of Legislative Assembly of Uttar Pradesh from Sarojini Nagar, Lucknow as a Bharatiya Janta Party candidate. She got 1,08,506 votes in this election. She became Minister of State (Independent Charge) in Yogi Adityanath's cabinet.

She was appointed to the ministries of NRI, Flood control, Agriculture Marketing and Export, Women Welfare, Maternal and Child welfare.

She also served as president of Uttar Pradesh BJP Mahila Morcha, a women's wing of Bharatiya Janata Party from October 2016 to February 2018.

In November 2019, she was riled up in case in which purported audio clip was released where she was heard allegedly threatening a police officer in Lucknow to drop an FIR against Ansal Builders. She goes on to ask the CO Binu Singh to sit with her to resolve the matter if she wanted to continue working in Lucknow. She was denied ticket by the party in the 2022 Uttar Pradesh Legislative Assembly election.
