= Chandrika Prasad =

Indian politician

Member of Parliament, Lok Sabha
- In office 1967–1977
- Preceded by: Murli Manohar
- Succeeded by: Chandra Sekhar
- Constituency: Ballia

Personal details
- Born: 1 July 1917 Ballia, United Provinces, British India
- Party: Indian National Congress

Chandrika Prasad was an Indian politician. He was elected to the Lok Sabha, the lower house of the Parliament of India from the Ballia constituency of Uttar Pradesh as a member of the Indian National Congress.
