= Surendra Nath Singh =

Indian politician (born 1962)

Member of Uttar Pradesh Legislative Assembly
- In office 19 March 2017 – 25 March 2022
- Preceded by: Jai Prakash Anchal
- Succeeded by: Jai Prakash Anchal
- Constituency: Bairia

Personal details
- Born: 1 October 1962 (age 64) Ballia, Uttar Pradesh, India
- Party: Vikassheel Insaan Party (2022-present)
- Other political affiliations: Bharatiya Janata Party (2017-2022)
- Spouse: Jayamala Singh (m. 1986)
- Children: 3
- Parent: Ram Narayan Singh
- Education: Master of Education; Master of Arts
- Profession: Politician

Surendra Nath Singh (born 1 October 1962) is an Indian politician and was a member of 17th Legislative Assembly of Uttar Pradesh of India. He represented the Bairia constituency in Ballia district of Uttar Pradesh and as a member of the Bharatiya Janata Party but switched to Vikassheel Insaan Party to fight the 2022 Uttar Pradesh Legislative Assembly Elections.

== Early life and education ==
Singh was born 1 October 1962 in Bairiya, Ballia district, Uttar Pradesh to his father Ramnarayan Singh. In 1986, he married Jayamala Singh, they have one son and two daughters. He belongs to Rajput Kshatriya community. In 1992, he got degree of Master of Education from Himachal Pradesh University, Himachal Pradesh and in 1994, he received a degree in Master of Arts in Sociology from Veer Bahadur Singh Purvanchal University, Jaunpur.

== Political career ==
Since 2017, he represents Bairiya constituency as an MLA of Bhartiya Janata Party. He defeated Samajwadi Party candidate Jai Prakash Anchal by a margin of 17,077 votes.

== Controversy ==
In April 2018, Surendra Nath Singh defended rape accused Kuldeep Singh Sengar by saying that a mother of three children cannot get raped. In May 2021, he claimed that cow urine will guarantee protection from the novel coronavirus. On 16 October 2019, BJP leader's daughter accused him of harassment for marrying the son of another politician.

== Crime ==
He has 8 criminal cases registered against Surendra Nath Singh as of 2019 and all these cases are under trial.

== Posts held ==
#	From	To	Position	Comments
01	March 2017	March 2022	Member, 17th Legislative Assembly of Uttar Pradesh	
