= Phephana Assembly constituency =

Constituency of the Uttar Pradesh legislative assembly in India

Coordinates: 25.78°N 84.04°E

Phephana
- Constituency No. 360 for the Uttar Pradesh Legislative Assembly

Constituency details
- Country: India
- Region: North India
- State: Uttar Pradesh
- District: Ballia
- Total electors: 331,153
- Reservation: None

Member of Legislative Assembly
- 18th Uttar Pradesh Legislative Assembly
- Incumbent Sangram Singh
- Party: Samajwadi Party
- Elected year: 2022

Phephana is a constituency of the Uttar Pradesh Legislative Assembly covering the city of Phephana in the Ballia district of Uttar Pradesh, India.

Phephana is one of five assembly constituencies in the Lok Sabha constituency of Ballia. Since 2008, this assembly constituency is numbered 360 among 403 constituencies.

== Members of Legislative Assembly ==
Year	Member	Party
Till 2012 : Constituency did not exist
2012	Upendra Tiwari	Bharatiya Janata Party
2017	Upendra Tiwari	Bharatiya Janata Party
2022	Sangram Singh Yadav	Samajwadi Party

== Election results ==
=== 2027 ===
2027 Uttar Pradesh Legislative Assembly election: Phephana
Party	Candidate	Votes	%	±%
INDIA				
NDA				
BSP				
NOTA	None of the above			
Majority				
Turnout				
gain from		Swing		

=== 2022 ===
2022 Uttar Pradesh Legislative Assembly election: Phephana
Party	Candidate	Votes	%	±%
SP	Sangram Singh	92,516	48.78	▲20.78
BJP	Upendra Tiwari	73,162	38.57	▼0.94
BSP	Kamaldev Singh Yadav	14,154	7.46	▼22.03
VIP	Vivek	2,256	1.19	
INC	Jayendra Pandey	2,229	1.18	
NOTA	None of the above	1,117	0.59	▼0.24
Majority		19,354	10.21	▲0.19
Turnout		189,662	57.27	▲0.54
SP gain from BJP		Swing		

=== 2017 ===
Bharatiya Janta Party candidate Upendra Tiwari won in last Assembly election of 2017 Uttar Pradesh Legislative Elections defeating Bahujan Samaj Party candidate Ambika Choudhary by a margin of 17,897 votes.

2017 Uttar Pradesh Legislative Assembly Election: Phephan
Party	Candidate	Votes	%	±%
BJP	Upendra Tiwari	70,588	39.51	
BSP	Ambika Choudhary	52,691	29.49	
SP	Sangram Singh Yadav	50,016	28.0	
NOTA	None of the above	1,473	0.83	
Majority		17,897	10.02	
Turnout		178,647	56.73	

== Members of Legislative Assembly ==
#	Term	Member of Legislative Assembly	Party	From	To	Days	Comment
01	16th Vidhan Sabha	Upendra Tiwari	Bhartiya Janata Party	March 2012	March 2017	1,829	
02	17th Vidhan Sabha	Upendra Tiwari	Bhartiya Janata Party	March 2017	March 2022	3476	
03	18th Vidhan Sabha	Sangram Singh	Samajwadi Party	March 2022	Incumbent	1659	
