= King of the Hill (disambiguation) =

King of the Hill is an American animated sitcom.

King of the Hill may also refer to:

== Games ==
- King of the hill (game), a children's game and related uses
- King of the Hill, a board game by Schaper Toys
- King of the Hill, a chess variant

== Film and television ==
- King of the Hill (1993 film), a film by Steven Soderbergh
- King of the Hill (2007 film) or The King of the Mountain, a Spanish thriller
- "King of the Hill" (Cheers), a 1985 television episode
- "King of the Hill" (Saved by the Bell), a 1989 television episode
- "King of the Hill" (The Simpsons), a 1998 television episode
- King of the Hill, a 1975 game show pilot hosted by Robert Earle

== Literature ==
- "King of the Hill", a 1955 short story by James Blish
- King of the Hill, a 1965 novel by Thomas Fleming
- King of the Hill, a 1973 memoir by A. E. Hotchner; basis for the 1993 film
- "King of the Hill!", a comic story featured in The Transformers #27 (April 1987), written by Bob Budiansky
- King of the Hill, a 1987 novel by Emma Goldrick
- King of the Hills, a 1933 novel by Stephen W. Meader
- Kings of the Hill, a 1983 non-fiction book by Dick Cheney and Lynne Cheney
- The King of the Hill, a 1991 short story collection by Paul J. McAuley

== Music ==
- King of the Hill (soundtrack), a 1999 soundtrack album from the TV series
- "King of the Hill", a song by Quiet Riot from QR
- "King of the Hill", a song by Roger McGuinn from the album Back from Rio
- "King of the Hill", a song by Thundercat from the album It Is What It Is
- "King of the Hill", a song by Minutemen from the EP Project: Mersh
- "King of the Hill", a song by Westside Connection from Bow Down

== Other uses ==
- King of the Hills Gold Mine, the current name for what was known as Tarmoola Gold Mine in Western Australia
- King of the Hill, the prototype name for the Chevrolet Corvette ZR-1

== See also ==
- King of the Mountain (disambiguation)
- KOTH (disambiguation)
