= Banaras Hindu University Students' Union =

Student organisation

The Banaras Hindu University Students' Union generally abbreviated as BHU Students' Union or BHUSU, was the students' union of Banaras Hindu University. The Students' Union had been responsible for representing students, both within the university and externally for all academic, non-academic and student welfare purposes.

== History ==
Banaras Hindu University Students' Union was established in the early 20th century (exact year not known). In its entire existence, the Students' Union has been suspended and banned several times. Its structure has also been changed from Students' union to Students' council and vice versa. The Students' Union in the Banaras Hindu University has a precedence of violence, strikes, lockdowns, expulsions, rioting and deaths.

=== 1958–1966 ===
In 1958, The Banaras Hindu University witnessed a students' strike. This resulted in banning of the BHU Students' Union for a period of eight years; from 1958 to 1966.

=== Early 1990s ===
In the early 1990s, when professor R. P. Rastogi was the Vice-Chancellor of the Banaras Hindu University, another student strike took place which resulted in banning of the BHU Students' Union.

=== 1997–2010 ===
The student union was banned abruptly when large-scale violence paralyzed the university campus on 20 February 1997. A student was killed during a blatant display of firearms while an election rally was underway at the amphitheater ground. The then Vice-Chancellor of the University Dr. Hari Gautam ordered an indefinite ban on union elections within the campus and disbanded the student wings of political parties (ABVP, SFI, NSUI, etc.). In order to curb the violence and lawlessness, the VC appointed Professor Omkar Nath Singh of Department of Geography and empowered the proctorial office by tripling the amount of funds it was allocated. To this date, an ordinary student at the university associates the student union with utter lawlessness and pompous display of power which serves no apparent purpose. VC Simhadri introduced new practice where professors were asked to sign to their presence in the attendance register everyday because some were working elsewhere despite being on the payroll of the university. He also expelled more than 50 students (many of whom were even gold medalists) on criminal charges. The university did not witness any violence, strike or dharnas since then. Shakti Sharan Singh was the last student union leader.

=== 2011 ===
In 2011, the Students' Union was replaced by a "Students' Council". Vikas Singh was elected as First General Secretary of BHU Students Council. He was removed on 7 April 2012 from his post for allegedly giving false information in his affidavit during university elections. On 30 April 2012 university reinstated Vikas Singh as the Students Council General Secretary following an order by the Allahabad High Court.

Unlike the Students' Union where the president was elected directly, in the Students' Council, every class elected its representative and the elected representatives in-turn elected the General Secretary (and other office bearers).

=== 2012–2016 ===
In Aug 2013, the Students' Council was disbanded and the university administration; based on the directions of Supreme Court of India (which was based on recommendations from Lyngdoh Committee section 6.2) decided to re-introduce the "Students' Union".

In Oct 2014, some students went on hunger strike, demanding student union elections. Instead of union election council election dates were subsequently announced on 11 November 2014 and the process was due to be completed by 30 November 2014. However, the elections had to be cancelled and the Students' Council had to be kept on hold due to violence, arson and clashes between students and police.

Elections were not held in 2015 and 2016, following ban introduced in 2014.

== Banaras Hindu University Students Council ==
Currently, BHU does not have an active political student union, but an administrative student council called the Banaras Hindu University Students Council to represent and safeguard the interests of the students.

== Notable student leaders ==
- Manoj Sinha, Governor of Jammu & Kashmir (formerly, Bharatiya Janata Party)
- Mohd Zama Khan (Janata Dal United)
- Rajesh Kumar Mishra (Indian National Congress)
- Veena Pandey (Bhartiya Janata Party)
- Mahendra Nath Pandey (Bhartiya Janata Party)
- Anil Srivastava (Indian National Congress)
- Kedar Nath Singh (Bhartiya Janata Party)
- Bharat Singh (Bhartiya Janata Party)
- Om Prakash Singh, Samajwadi Party 7 time MLA one time MP (two time former cabinet minister)

== See also ==
- Banaras Hindu University
- Delhi University Students' Union
- Jawaharlal Nehru University Students' Union
