= Bairia Assembly constituency =

Constituency of the Uttar Pradesh legislative assembly in India

Coordinates: 25.77°N 84.48°E

Bairia
- Constituency No. 363 for the Uttar Pradesh Legislative Assembly

Constituency details
- Country: India
- Region: North India
- State: Uttar Pradesh
- District: Ballia
- Reservation: None

Member of Legislative Assembly
- 18th Uttar Pradesh Legislative Assembly
- Incumbent Jai Prakash Anchal
- Party: Samajwadi Party
- Elected year: 2022
- Preceded by: Surendra Nath Singh

Bairia is a constituency of the Uttar Pradesh Legislative Assembly covering the city of Bairia in the Ballia district of Uttar Pradesh, India. Bairia is one of five assembly constituencies in the Lok Sabha constituency of Ballia. Since 2008, this assembly constituency is numbered 363 amongst 403 constituencies.

== Members of Legislative Assembly ==
Year	Member	Party
Till 2012 : Constituency did not exist
2012	Jai Prakash Anchal	Samajwadi Party
2017	Surendra Nath Singh	Bharatiya Janata Party
2022	Jai Prakash Anchal	Samajwadi Party

== Election results ==
=== 2027 ===
2027 Uttar Pradesh Legislative Assembly election: Bairia
Party	Candidate	Votes	%	±%
INDIA				
NDA				
BSP				
NOTA	None of the above			
Majority				
Turnout				
gain from		Swing		

=== 2022 ===
2022 Uttar Pradesh Legislative Assembly election: Bairia
Party	Candidate	Votes	%	±%
SP	Jai Prakash Anchal	71,241	40.33	▲10.85
BJP	Anand Swarup Shukla	58,290	33.0	▼7.02
VIP	Surendra Nath Singh	28,615	16.2	
BSP	Subhash Yadav	12,695	7.19	▼10.07
NOTA	None of the above	1,958	1.11	▲0.64
Majority		12,951	7.33	▼3.21
Turnout		176,654	48.11	▲0.77
SP gain from BJP		Swing		

=== 2017 ===
Bharatiya Janata Party candidate Surendra Nath Singh won in last Assembly election of 2017 Uttar Pradesh Legislative Elections defeating Samajwadi Party candidate Jai Prakash Anchal by a margin of 17,077 votes.

2017 Uttar Pradesh Legislative Assembly election: Bairia
Party	Candidate	Votes	%	±%
BJP	Surendra Nath Singh	64,868	40.02	
SP	Jai Prakash Anchal	47,791	29.48	
BSP	Javahar	27,974	17.26	
Independent	Ashani Singh	6,122	3.78	
Independent	Manoj	5,946	3.67	
Independent	Sanjay	2,197	1.36	
NOTA	None of the above	762	0.47	
Majority		17,077	10.54	
Turnout		162,100	47.34	
BJP gain from SP		Swing		
