= Manager Singh =

Indian activist

Manager Singh (20 January 1920 – 28 October 1993), widely known as Malviya of Dwaba or JanNayak (leader of the common people), was an Indian independence activist and political leader. He was elected five times as the MLA from Duab Assembly constituency.

== Early life ==
Manager Singh was born in Karmanpur village of Ballia District of Uttar Pradesh. He is worshipped and glorified by people of Ballia District of Uttar Pradesh.
