= Sangram Singh (politician) =

Member of Uttar Pradesh Legislative Assembly

Sangram Singh Yadav
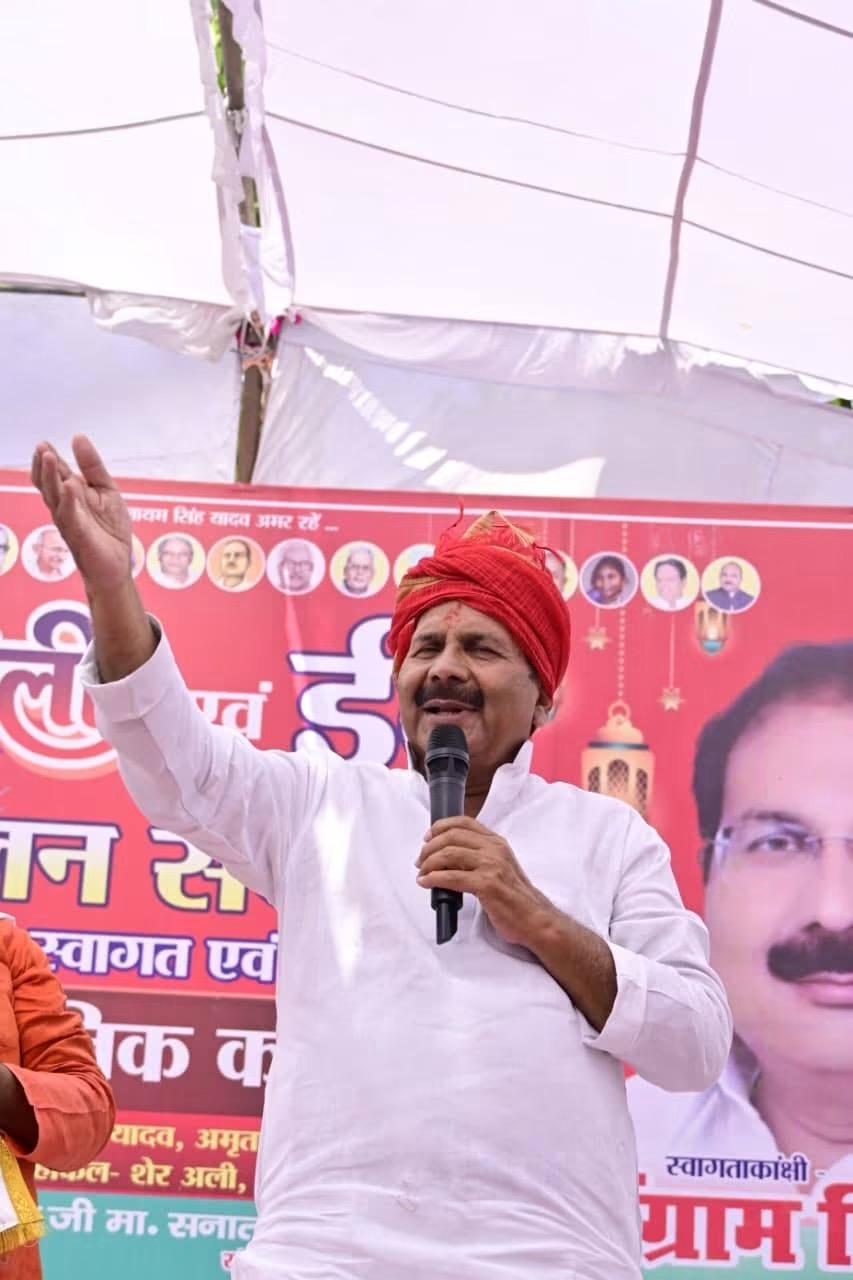

Member of the Uttar Pradesh Legislative Assembly
- In office 1993–1995
- Preceded by: Ram Akbal Singh
- Constituency: Chilkahar

Member of the Uttar Pradesh Legislative Assembly
- Incumbent
- Assumed office March 2022
- Preceded by: Upendra Tiwari
- Constituency: Phephana

Personal details
- Born: 1 June 1961 (age 65) Ballia, Uttar Pradesh
- Party: Samajwadi Party
- Spouse: Pinki Devi
- Children: 3
- Parent: Hardev Singh Yadav (father)
- Education: Bachelor of Science
- Alma mater: DDU Gorakhpur University
- Occupation: Politician, Farmer

Sangram Singh Yadav is an Indian politician, farmer, and a member of the 18th Uttar Pradesh Assembly from the Phephana Assembly constituency. He is a member of the Samajwadi Party.

== Early life ==
Sangram Singh was born on 1 June 1961 in Ballia, Uttar Pradesh, to a Hindu family of Hardev Singh Yadav. He married Phool Kumari on 11 May 1983, and they have three children.

== Education ==
Sangram Singh completed his education with a Bachelor of Science at Deen Dayal Upadhyay Gorakhpur University, Gorakhpur, in 1982. Later, he joined Veer Bahadur Singh Purvanchal University, Jaunpur, where he completed a Bachelor of Education in 1989.

== Posts held ==
#	From	To	Position	Comments
01	2022	Incumbent	Member, Uttar Pradesh Legislative Assembly	
