= Katghara, Jaunpur =

Katghara, Ram Nagar, Mariahu, Jaunpur
- village
- Location in Uttar Pradesh, India Katghara, Ram Nagar, Mariahu, Jaunpur (India)
- Coordinates: 25°34′0″N 82°36′0″E
- Country: India
- State: Uttar Pradesh
- District: Jaunpur

Government
  - Body: Gram Panchayat
- Elevation: 87 m (285 ft)

Population
  - Total: 1,000 (Approx)

Languages
  - Official: Hindi
  - Local: Awadhi-Mixed Bhojpuri
- Time zone: UTC+5:30 (IST)
- Postal code: 222161
- Vehicle registration: UP-62
- Coastline: 0 kilometres (0 mi)

Katghara is a village in Ram Nagar Block of Mariahu Tehsil of Jaunpur district of Uttar Pradesh, India. Its Postal Zip Code is 222161

== Geography ==
Katghara rises 285 feet above sea level. Its geographical position is 25°34' North, 82°36' East.

== Inside the village ==
A canal runs through the village from north to south. There is also a lake (Talab or Pokhara) and Shiv Temple.

=== Government offices ===
Katghara has various government offices and educational institutes such as a veterinary hospital, government telephone exchange office, Government Model School and a Jawahar Navodaya Vidyalaya.

=== Social structure ===
People of this village belonging to various castes like Mirza, Kayastha, Yadav, Rajputs, Brahmins, Pal (Shepherd), Harijans (or Dalit), Kahars.
