= Jai Prakash Anchal =

Indian politician

Member of the Uttar Pradesh Legislative Assembly
- In office 2012–2017
- Preceded by: constituency established
- Succeeded by: Jai Prakash Anchal
- Constituency: Bairia (Assembly constituency)
- Incumbent
- Assumed office 2022
- Preceded by: Jai Prakash Anchal

Personal details
- Born: Ballia Uttar Pradesh
- Party: Samajwadi Party
- Children: two sons and one daughter
- Education: Gorakhpur University; Mahatma Gandhi Kashi Vidyapith
- Occupation: Politician
- Profession: Samajwadi party leader

Jai Prakash Anchal is an Indian politician and a member of the Samajwadi Party from the state of Uttar Pradesh. Anchal is a member of the 18th Uttar Pradesh Assembly representing the Bairia Vidhan Sabha constituency.

He lost his seat in the 2017 Uttar Pradesh Assembly election to Surendra Nath Singh of the Bharatiya Janata Party.
