= Upendra Tiwari =

Indian politician

Minister of Youth Affairs & Sports Government of Uttar Pradesh
- In office 21 August 2019 – 25 March 2022
- Chief Minister: Yogi Adityanath
- Preceded by: Chetan Chauhan
- Succeeded by: Girish Yadav

Minister of Water Resources Government of Uttar Pradesh
- In office 19 March 2017 – 21 August 2019
- Chief Minister: Yogi Adityanath
- Succeeded by: Mahendra Kumar Singh

Member of Uttar Pradesh Legislative Assembly
- In office 2012–2022
- Preceded by: Constituency Created
- Succeeded by: Sangram Singh Yadav
- Constituency: Phephana

Personal details
- Born: 10 January 1973 (age 53) Ballia, Uttar Pradesh
- Party: Bharatiya Janata Party
- Spouse: Dipika Tiwari (m. 2004)
- Children: 2
- Parent: Vishwanath Tiwari (father)
- Education: Bachelor of Laws; Master of Arts
- Profession: Politician

Upendra Tiwari is an Indian politician and Minister of State (Independent Charge), of the Bharatiya Janata Party. Tiwari is a member of the Uttar Pradesh Legislative Assembly from the Phephana Vidhan Sabha constituency in Ballia district. He defeated a big leader of UP Ambika Chaudhari BSP (Ex-SP Leader). He was a student at the University of Allahabad.

== Early life and education ==
Tiwari was born 10 January 1973 in Ballia, Uttar Pradesh to his father Vishwanath Tiwari in a Bhumihar family. In 2004, he married Dipika Tiwari, they have two daughters. He got Master of Arts (Hindi) degree in 1999 and Bachelor of Laws degree in 1996 from Allahabad University. In 2002 he got Master of Arts in Ancient History degree from Chattarpati Sahu Ji Maharaj College Kanpur.

== Political career ==
He has been an MLA since 2012, from Phephana constituency in Ballia district of Uttar Pradesh. In the first term 2012 Uttar Pradesh Legislative Assembly election he defeated Samajwadi Party candidate Ambika Chaudhary by a margin of 7,387 votes.

In second term 2017 Uttar Pradesh Legislative Assembly election he again defeated Bahujan Samaj Party candidate Ambika Choudhary by a margin of 17,897 votes.

In March 2017, he got State Ministry (Independent charge) of Water compensation, Land Development, Water Resources, Barren Land Development, Forest and Environment, Uddyan, Cooperatives in Yogi Adityanath ministry.

== Controversy ==
On 21 October 2021, Tiwari said that "95% Indians Don't Need Petrol" while trying to justify fuel price hike during a press conference.

== Posts held ==
#	From	To	Position	Comments
01	March 2012	March 2017	Member, 16th Legislative Assembly of Uttar Pradesh	
02	March 2017	March 2022	Member, 17th Legislative Assembly of Uttar Pradesh, Minister of State (Independent Charge)	
