= Doaba Assembly constituency =

Former assembly constituency of Uttar Pradesh, India

Coordinates: 25°45′30″N 80°8′56″E

Doaba
- Former constituency for the Uttar Pradesh Legislative Assembly

Constituency details
- Country: India
- Region: North India
- State: Uttar Pradesh
- District: Ballia
- Lok Sabha constituency: Ballia
- Established: 1974
- Abolished: 2012
- Total electors: 45,199 (in 2007)

Doaba was a constituency of the Uttar Pradesh Legislative Assembly covering the city of Bairia in the Ballia district of Uttar Pradesh, India.

Doaba was one of five assembly constituencies in the Ballia (Lok Sabha constituency). After 2008, this constituency has been replaced by the Bairia Assembly Constituency.

== Members of the Legislative Assembly ==
Election	MLA	Party	Total Vote
1974	Rudra Prasad	INC	26,298
1977	Manager Singh	JP	30,038
1980	Lokpati	INC(I)	36,163
1985	Manager Singh	JP	29,944
1989	Rudra Prasad	JD	31,392
1991	Bhagawat	BSP	20,979
1993	Bhagawat	BSP	53,971
1996	Ram Chandra	BJP	54,472
2002	Dr Ramesh Chand Bind	BSP	46,146
2007	Dr Ramesh Chand Bind	BSP	45,199

== See also ==
- Bairia (Assembly Constituency)
- Ballia (Lok Sabha Constituency)
- Ballia District
- Uttar Pradesh
- Uttar Pradesh Legislative Assembly
