= Anand Swarup Shukla =

Indian politician

Minister of state for Rural Development Government of Uttar Pradesh
- In office 21 August 2019 – 25 March 2022
- Chief Minister: Yogi Adityanath
- Minister: Rajendra Pratap Singh

Minister of state for Parliamentary Affairs Government of Uttar Pradesh
- In office 21 August 2019 – 25 March 2022
- Chief Minister: Yogi Adityanath
- Minister: Suresh Khanna

Member of Uttar Pradesh Legislative Assembly
- In office 2017–2022
- Preceded by: Narad Rai
- Succeeded by: Daya Shankar Singh
- Constituency: Ballia Nagar

Personal details
- Born: 6 October 1979 (age 46) Ballia, Uttar Pradesh
- Party: Bharatiya Janata Party
- Parents: Harihar Nath Shukla (father); Sita Shukla (mother)
- Education: M.Sc, M.A., B.Ed
- Profession: Politician

Anand Swarup Shukla is an Indian politician and a member of 17th Legislative Assembly of Uttar Pradesh in India. He represented the Ballia Nagar constituency in Ballia district and was Minister of State for Parliamentary Affairs and Rural Development, Overall Village Development in Uttar Pradesh Government. He lost U.P. state election 2022. He is currently a member of the Bharatiya Janata Party.

== Early life and education ==
Shukla was born 6 October 1979 in Ballia, Uttar Pradesh to his father Harihar Nath Shuklaji. He has completed M.Sc. in Mathematics, M.A. in Political science and B.Ed. He completed his schooling from Nagaji Saraswati Vidya Mandir Senior Secondary School, Maldepur Ballia.

== Political career ==
Shukla has been MLA for one term. Since 2017, he represents Ballia Nagar constituency as a member of Bhartiya Janata Party. In 2017 Uttar Pradesh Legislative Assembly election, he defeated Samajwadi Party candidate Laxman by a margin of 40,011 votes. He has been appointed Minister of state in a Yogi Adityanath cabinet on 21 August 2019.

In March 2021, Shukla called for the banning of the Burka in India.

== Posts held ==
#	From	To	Position	Comments
01	March 2017	March 2022	Member, 17th Legislative Assembly of Uttar Pradesh	
