= Sarojini Nagar Assembly constituency =

Assembly constituency in Uttar Pradesh, India

Coordinates: 26.75°N 80.86°E

Sarojini Nagar
- Constituency No. 170 for the Uttar Pradesh Legislative Assembly

Constituency details
- Country: India
- Region: North India
- State: Uttar Pradesh
- District: Lucknow
- Lok Sabha constituency: Mohanlalganj
- Total electors: 5,67,252
- Reservation: None

Member of Legislative Assembly
- 18th Uttar Pradesh Legislative Assembly
- Incumbent Rajeshwar Singh
- Party: BJP
- Alliance: NDA
- Elected year: 2022

Sarojini Nagar is one of the 403 assembly constituencies of the Uttar Pradesh Legislative Assembly covering the area of Sarojini Nagar in the Lucknow district. It is one of five assembly constituencies in the Mohanlalganj Lok Sabha constituency.

Since 2008, this assembly constituency is numbered 170 amongst 403 constituencies.

In 2022 Uttar Pradesh Legislative Assembly elections, Bharatiya Janata Party (BJP) candidate Rajeshwar Singh won the elections defeating Samajwadi Party candidate Abhishek Mishra by the margin of 56,186 votes. He is an ex-ED Joint Director IPS officer who has taken VRS from the service to contest the elections.

== Members of Legislative Assembly ==
Year	Member	Party
1967	Vijay Kumar Tripathi	Indian National Congress
1969	Chandra Bhanu Gupta	Indian National Congress
1974	Vijay Kumar Tripathi	Indian National Congress
1977	Chheda Singh Chauhan	Janata Party
1980	Vijay Kumar Tripathi	Indian National Congress
1985	Sharda Pratap Shukla	Independent
1989	Sharda Pratap Shukla	Janata Dal
1991	Vijay Kumar Tripathi	Indian National Congress
1993	Shyam Kishore Yadav	Samajwadi Party
1996	Shyam Kishore Yadav	Samajwadi Party
2002	Mohammad Irshad Khan	Bahujan Samaj Party
2007	Mohammad Irshad Khan	Bahujan Samaj Party
2012	Sharda Pratap Shukla	Samajwadi Party
2017	Swati Singh	Bharatiya Janata Party
2022	Rajeshwar Singh	Bharatiya Janata Party

== Election results ==
=== 2027 ===
2027 Uttar Pradesh Legislative Assembly election: Sarojini Nagar
Party	Candidate	Votes	%	±%
INDIA				
NDA				
BSP				
NOTA	None of the above			
Majority				
Turnout				
gain from		Swing		

=== 2022 ===
2022 Uttar Pradesh Legislative Assembly election: Sarojini Nagar
Party	Candidate	Votes	%	±%
BJP	Rajeshwar Singh	160,626	49.07	+11.76
SP	Abhishek Mishra	104,440	31.9	+6.34
BSP	Mohd. Jaleesh Khan	33,356	10.19	−14.49
INC	Rudra Daman Singh	19,711	6.02	
NOTA	None of the above	1,822	0.56	−0.11
Majority		56,186	17.17	+5.42
Turnout		327,373	57.71	−0.63
BJP hold		Swing		

=== 2017 ===
2017 Uttar Pradesh Legislative Assembly Election: Sarojini Nagar
Party	Candidate	Votes	%	±%
BJP	Swati Singh	108,506	37.31	
SP	Anurag Yadav	74,327	25.56	
BSP	Shiv Shankar Singh	71,791	24.68	
Independent	Rudra Daman Singh	20,607	7.09	
RLD	Sharda Pratap Shukla	4,489	1.54	
Rashtriya Shoshit Samaj Party	Kamlesh Kumar	3,378	1.16	
NOTA	None of the above	1,926	0.67	
Majority		34,179	11.75	
Turnout		290,847	58.34	

=== 2012 ===
2012 Uttar Pradesh Legislative Assembly election: Sarojini Nagar
Party	Candidate	Votes	%	±%
SP	Sharda Pratap Shukla	67,601	28.88	
BSP	Shiv Shankar Singh	59,236	25.30	
RSBP	Rudra Daman Singh	41,386	17.68	
BJP	Virendra Kumar Tiwari	29,510	12.61	
INC	Gaurav Choudhry	22,003	9.40	
AD(K)	Sher Bahadur Singh (Shera)	2,581	1.10	
Majority		8,365	3.58	
Turnout		2,34,090	59.17	
SP gain from Bahujan Samaj party (mayawati)		Swing		

=== 2007 ===
2007 Uttar Pradesh Legislative Assembly election: Sarojini Nagar
Party	Candidate	Votes	%	±%
BSP	Mohammad Irshad Khan	65,736	36.99	
SP	Shyam Kishore Yadav	60,312	33.93	
BJP	Virendra Kumar Tiwari	21,364	12.02	
INC	Ajay Kumar Tripathi	10,487	5.90	
JM	Lalloo Yadav	3,434	1.93	
RSBP	Bachan Singh Yadav	1,952	1.10	
Majority		5,424	3.06	
Turnout		1,77,723	43.56	
BSP hold		Swing		
