= Ibrahimpatti =

Village in Ballia district of Uttar Pradesh

Ibrahimpatti near Koth is a village in Ballia district of Uttar Pradesh, India. It is situated 69 kilometres (43 mi) from Ballia. As of 2011 Census of India, this village has a population of 1,674.

A former Prime Minister of India, Chandra Shekhar, was a native of Ibrahimpatti. Ibrahim Patti's nearest railway station is Kirihrapur.
