= Neeraj Shekhar =

Indian politician

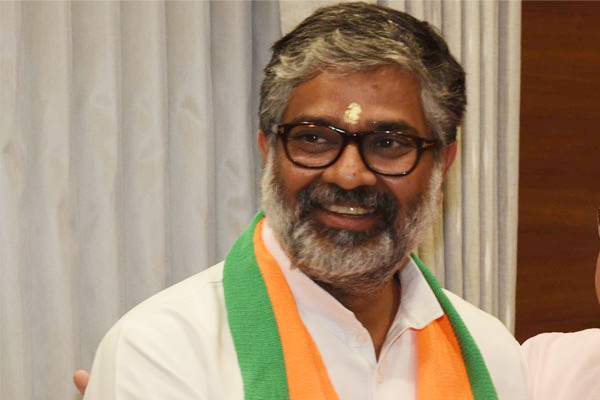
- Neeraj Shekhar in 2019

Member of Parliament, Rajya Sabha
- In office 26 November 2014 – 26 November 2026
- Preceded by: Avtar Singh Karimpuri
- Constituency: Uttar Pradesh

Member of Parliament, Lok Sabha
- In office January 2008 – 16 May 2014
- Preceded by: Chandra Shekhar
- Succeeded by: Bharat Singh
- Constituency: Ballia

Personal details
- Born: 10 November 1968 (age 57) Ibrahimpatti, Uttar Pradesh, India
- Party: Bharatiya Janata Party
- Other political affiliations: Samajwadi Party, Samajwadi Janata Party (Rashtriya)
- Spouse: Sushma Shekhar
- Children: 2
- Parents: Chandra Shekhar (father); Duja Devi (mother)

Neeraj Shekhar Singh (born 10 October 1968) is an Indian politician from the Bharatiya Janata Party (BJP). He was a Lok Sabha MP from Ballia and a Rajya Sabha MP

== Early life ==
He was born to the former Prime Minister Chandra Shekhar and Duja Devi, in Ibrahimpatti in Ballia district, Uttar Pradesh. He belongs to a Rajput family.

== Political career ==
On 29 December 2007, he contested and won from the Ballia constituency as a Samajwadi Party candidate, in the by-election held due to the death of his father. He got over 295,000 votes.

In 2009, he was re-elected to the 15th Lok Sabha from the same constituency. However, he was defeated in 2014 by Bharat Singh of BJP. Currently, he is a Rajya Sabha member.

His election campaign was supported by Communist Party of India (Marxist), Communist Party of India and former Bharatiya Janata Party MP Rajnath Singh. He left Samajwadi Party on 15 July 2019 and resigned as Rajya Sabha MP on the same date and joined the BJP.

== Personal life ==
He is married Sushma Shekhar and has 2 children.

== Elections Contested ==
=== Rajya Sabha ===
Position	Party	Constituency	From	To	Tenure	Remarks
Member of Parliament, Rajya Sabha (1st Term)	SP	Uttar Pradesh	26 November 2014	15 July 2019	4 years, 231 days	Resignation before term end on 25/11/2020
Member of Parliament, Rajya Sabha (2nd Term)	BJP	Uttar Pradesh	20 August 2019	25 November 2020	1 year, 97 days	elected in bye-election resignation by himself
Member of Parliament, Rajya Sabha (3rd Term)	BJP	Uttar Pradesh	26 November 2020	25 November 2026	5 years, 364 days	

Lok Sabha
Preceded by Chandra Shekhar	Member of Parliament for Ballia; 2007 – 2014	Succeeded by Bharat Singh
Rajya Sabha
Preceded by Avtar Singh Karimpuri	Member of Parliament for Rajya Sabha (Uttar Pradesh); 2014 - 2019	Succeeded by Vacant
