= Raja Mohar Singh =

Ruler of Mahura from 1894 to 1923

- The Ruler of Maurha
- Reign: 1894-1923
- Successor: Babu Jai Prasad Singh
- Born: Maurha, Uttar Pradesh, British India
- Died: 1923; Maurha
- Issue: Babu Ram Prasad Singh; Babu Jai Prasad Singh
- House: Chandravanshi, Rajput
- Religion: Hinduism

Raja Mohar Singh was a Rajput of Chandravanshi (Somavanshi) dynasty. Raja Mohar Singh was the Raja of Maurha from 1894 until 1923.

== History ==
There he built a Bhawan and called it Mohar Bhawan after himself. Subsequently, the area around the Bhawan became known as Maurha.
