= Katghara, Deoria =

Katghara, Deoria Katghara
- village
- Location in Uttar Pradesh, India Katghara, Deoria (India)
- Coordinates: 26°14′35.77″N 84°2′23.37″E
- Country: India
- State: Uttar Pradesh
- District: Deoria

Population (2001)
  - Total: 1,221

Languages
  - Official: Hindi
- Time zone: UTC+5:30 (IST)

Katghara is a village in the Deoria district in the state of Uttar Pradesh, India.

== Geography ==
Katghara falls under the Bhatpar Rani block. It has its own gram panchayat.

== Demographics ==
As of the 2001 Indian census, Kathaghara had a population of 1,221. Males constitute 47% of the population and females 53%.

== Cities, towns, and neighborhoods ==
The nearest place for shopping is Aktahi. The nearest town is Bhatpar Rani.

== Schools ==
Katghara village has primary school funded by the state government. It also has a privately owned middle school (up to class 10). There are schools in Bahiyari and Sohanpur for 10+2. The only option for graduation is Madan Mohan Malviya University situated at Bhatpar Rani.
