= Murli Manohar =

Indian politician

Murli Manohar Advocate (born 17 December 1895) was an Indian politician from Uttar Pradesh state, and the member of parliament in 1962 for the Ballia Lok Sabha constituency from Indian National Congress.
