= Daya Shankar Singh =

Indian politician

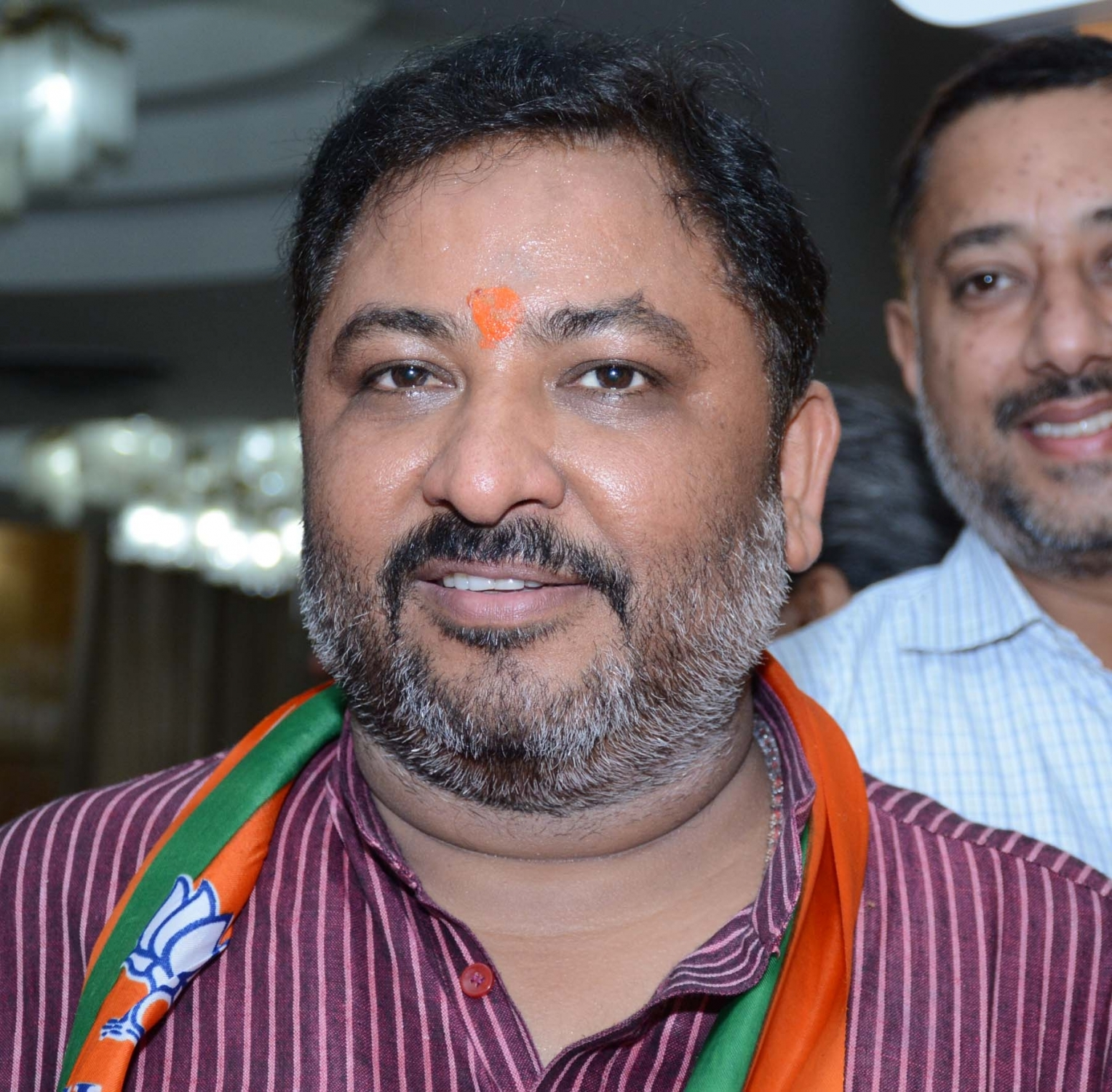

Minister of State (Independent Charge) Government of Uttar Pradesh
- Incumbent
- Assumed office 25 March 2022
- Chief Minister: Yogi Adityanath
- Ministry & Department's: Transport
- Preceded by: Ashok Katariya

Member of Uttar Pradesh Legislative Assembly
- Incumbent
- Assumed office March 2022
- Preceded by: Anand Swaroop Shukla
- Constituency: Ballia Nagar

Personal details
- Born: 1970 or 1971 (age 55–56)
- Party: Bharatiya Janata Party
- Spouse: Swati Singh (m. 2001; div. 2023)
- Education: Lucknow University, (M.A, 1998)
- Profession: Businessperson, lawyer

Daya Shankar Singh is an Indian politician and a member of 18th Legislative Assembly of Uttar Pradesh representing Ballia Nagar. He is a member of the Bharatiya Janata Party as well as the state vice-president of the party.

== Personal life ==
Daya Shankar Singh was born to Vindyachal Singh and hails from Rajpur village in the Buxar district of Bihar. He is a postgraduate and has a Masters of Arts in Medieval History from Lucknow University, received in 1998. Singh is a businessperson and a lawyer by profession. He married politician Swati Singh on 18 May 2001 and divorced her in April 2023. Singh lives in Lucknow.

== Political career ==
Active in the politics of Ballia, Singh started his career in 1991 by contesting in student union elections in Lucknow University as an ABVP candidate. He was the national secretary and vice-president of the Bharatiya Janata Yuva Morcha. Singh had also contested unsuccessfully from Ballia in the 2007 Uttar Pradesh Legislative Assembly election.

In the 2022 Uttar Pradesh Legislative Assembly election, Singh represented Bharatiya Janata Party as a candidate from Ballia Nagar constituency and went on to defeat Samajwadi Party's Narad Rai by a margin of 23,239 votes, succeeding own party member Anand Swaroop Shukla in the process.

Singh assumed office as the Minister of Transport on 25 March 2022.
