= Chandra Shekhar =

Prime Minister of India from 1990 to 1991

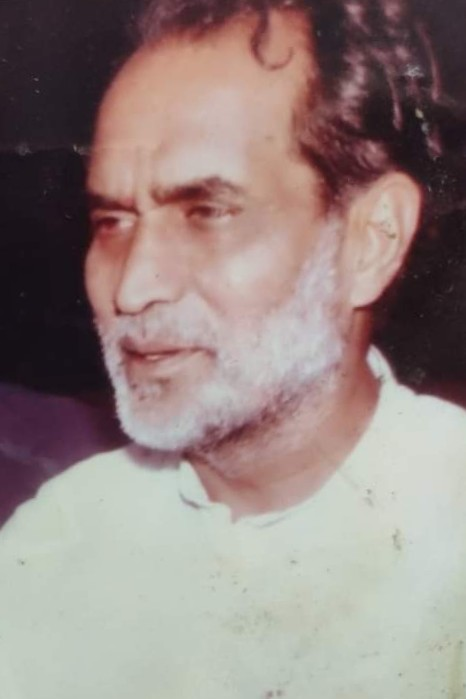
- Chandra Shekhar in 1991

Prime Minister of India
- In office 10 November 1990 – 1 June 1991
- President: Ramaswamy Venkataraman
- Vice President: Shankar Dayal Sharma
- Deputy: Chaudhary Devi Lal
- Preceded by: Vishwanath Pratap Singh
- Succeeded by: P. V. Narasimha Rao

Member of Parliament, Rajya Sabha
- In office 3 April 1962 – 22 March 1977
- Constituency: Uttar Pradesh

Member of Parliament, Lok Sabha
- In office 2 December 1989 – 8 July 2007
- Preceded by: Jagannath Chowdhary
- Succeeded by: Neeraj Shekhar
- Constituency: Ballia, Uttar Pradesh
- In office 22 March 1977 – 31 October 1984
- Preceded by: Chandrika Prasad
- Succeeded by: Jagannath Chowdhary
- Constituency: Ballia, Uttar Pradesh

President of the Janata Party
- In office 1977 – 1988
- Preceded by: Office established
- Succeeded by: Ajit Singh

Personal details
- Born: Chandra Shekhar; 17 April 1927 Ibrahimpatti, United Provinces of Agra and Oudh, British India
- Died: 8 July 2007 (aged 80) New Delhi, Delhi, India
- Party: Samajwadi Janata Party (Rashtriya) (1990–2007)
- Other political affiliations: Congress Socialist Party (before 1964); Indian National Congress (1964–1975); Independent (1975–1977); Janata Party (1977–1988); Janata Dal (1988–1990)
- Spouse: Duja Devi
- Children: 2 (including Neeraj Shekhar)
- Education: Allahabad University (M.A)
- Monuments: Jannayak Sthal

Chandra Shekhar (17 April 1927 – 8 July 2007) was an Indian politician and the prime minister of India, between 10 November 1990 and 21 June 1991. He headed a minority government of a breakaway faction of the Janata Dal with outside support from the Indian National Congress. He was the second Indian Prime Minister who had never held any prior government office.

His government was formed with the fewest party MPs in the Lok Sabha. His government could not pass the budget at a crucial time when Moody's had downgraded India's credit rating, after Shekhar's government was unable to pass the budget, global credit-rating agencies further downgraded India from investment grade, making it impossible to even get short-term loans, and in no position to give any commitment to reform, the World Bank and IMF stopped their assistance. Shekhar had to authorise the mortgaging of gold to avoid default of payment, and this action came in for particular criticism, as it was done secretly in the midst of the election. The 1991 Indian economic crisis and the assassination of Rajiv Gandhi plunged his government into crisis. Granting the permission for US military planes to refuel at Indian airports during the Gulf War improved the Prime Minister's image with the West.

== Personal life ==
=== Early years and education ===
Chandra Shekhar was born on 17 April 1927 in a Rajput family at Ibrahimpatti, a village in Ballia, Uttar Pradesh. He came from a farming background. He was awarded a Bachelor of Arts (graduate) degree at Satish Chandra P.G. College. He attended Allahabad University, obtaining his master's degree in political science in 1950. He was known as a firebrand student leader in student politics and started his political career with Ram Manohar Lohia. After completing his graduation, he became active in socialist politics.

=== Family ===
Chandra Shekhar married Duja Devi. Duja Devi Degree College, founded in 1999 in Ballia district, Uttar Pradesh, is named after her.

He had two sons with her, Pankaj Shekhar and Neeraj Shekhar.

== Political life ==
=== Start of career ===
He joined the socialist movement and was elected secretary of the district Praja Socialist Party (PSP), Ballia. Within a year, he was elected joint secretary of the PSP's State unit in Uttar Pradesh. In 1955–56, he took over as general secretary of the party in the State. His career as a parliamentarian began with his election to the Rajya Sabha from Uttar Pradesh in 1962. He came under the spell of Acharya Narendra Dev, a fiery Socialist leader at the beginning of his political career. From 1962 to 1977, Shekhar was a member of Rajya Sabha, the Upper house of the Parliament of India. He was elected to Rajya Sabha from Uttar Pradesh on 3 April 1962 as an independent candidate and completed his tenure on 2 April 1968. After this, he was re-elected twice to Rajya Sabha from Uttar Pradesh as an INC candidate from 3 April 1968 to 2 April 1974 and from 3 April 1974 to 2 April 1980. He resigned from Rajya Sabha on 2 March 1977 after he had been elected to Lok Sabha from Ballia. When the emergency was declared, even though he was a Congress party politician, he was arrested and sent to Patiala jail.

=== Join Congress ===
Chandra Shekhar was a prominent leader of the socialists. He joined Congress in 1964. From 1962 to 1967, he was a member of the Rajya Sabha. He first entered the Lok Sabha in 1977. He came to be known as a 'young Turk' for his conviction and courage in the fight against the vested interests. The other 'young Turks', who formed the 'ginger group' in the Congress in the fight for egalitarian policies, included leaders like Feroze Gandhi, Satyendra Narayan Sinha, Mohan Dharia, Chandrajit Yadav, and Ram Dhan. As a member of the Congress Party, he vehemently criticised Indira Gandhi for her declaration of emergency in 1975. Chandrashekhar was arrested during the emergency and sent to prison along with other "young turks".

=== Bharat Yatra (1983) ===
Chandra Shekhar went on a nationwide padayatra in 1983 from Kanyakumari to New Delhi, to know the country better, which he claimed gave jitters to Prime Minister Indira Gandhi. He was called a "Young Turk". He travelled nearly 4,260 km and nearly six months. Chandra Shekhar started his Bharat Yatra from Kanyakumari on 6, the same day that his party, Janata Party was swept to power in Karnataka. He finished his march at Rajghat in New Delhi on 25 June, the eighth anniversary of the declaration of the Emergency and also the day India won the Cricket World Cup.

Chandra Shekhar established Bharat Yatra Centres in various parts of the country and set up a Bharat Yatra Trust in Bhondsi village in Haryana's Gurgaon to focus on rural development. "Bharat Yatra Kendra" "Bhondsi ashram" was set up by the Chandra Shekhar in 1983 on 600 acre of panchayat land, where godman Chandraswami and godman's associate Adnan Khashoggi (a Saudi Arabian billionaire international arms dealer embroiled in various scandals) use to visit him. Before 2002, some of the government land of the ashram was taken back by the Government of Haryana on the instructions of then Chief Minister Om Prakash Chautala (in office 1989–91 and 1999–2004). In 2002, Supreme Court of India returned most of the land, barring some land, to the Bhondsi gram panchayat.

=== In Janata Party ===
Chandrasekhar was jailed during the emergency and after, he became the President of Janata Party. In the parliamentary elections, Janata Party formed the government after the 1977 Indian general election headed by Morarji Desai. However the party lost the 1980 elections and were routed in 1984 Indian general election winning just 10 seats and Chandrasekhar losing his own Ballia seat to Jagannath Chowdhary.

In May 1988, he resigned from Janata Party's President post when Lok Dal (A) was merged with Janata Party. Ajit Singh was made president of Janata Party. George Fernandes, Biju Patnaik, Madhu Dandavate and Ramakrishna Hegde opposed this merger with Lok Dal (A) but Subramanian Swamy, Yashwant Sinha and Suryadeo Singh supported this move.

In 1988, his party merged with other parties and formed the government under the leadership of V.P. Singh. Again his relationship with the coalition deteriorated and he formed another party, Janata Dal (Socialist) faction. With the support of Congress (I) headed by Rajiv Gandhi, he replaced V.P. Singh as the Prime Minister of India in November 1990. After 1977, he was elected to Lok Sabha in all the elections, except in 1984 when the Congress swept the polls after Indira Gandhi's assassination. The post of Prime Minister, which he thought he genuinely deserved, eluded him in 1989 when V. P. Singh pipped him at the post and was chosen to head the first coalition government at the centre.

=== Deposing V. P. Singh ===
Chandra Shekhar seized the moment and left the Janata Dal with several of his own supporters to form the Samajwadi Janata Party/Janata Dal (Socialist). He won a confidence motion with the support of his 64 MPs and Rajiv Gandhi, the leader of the Opposition, and was sworn in as Prime Minister. Eight Janata Dal MPs who voted for this motion were disqualified by the speaker Rabi Ray.

=== In Parliament ===
Chandra Shekhar was a member of Rajya Sabha from 1962 to 1977, 1962 to 1968 as an independent supported by Socialist Party and later as member of Congress. He was jailed during the Emergency. After his release from jail in 1977, he joined Janata Party. He was elected to Lok Sabha from Ballia as a member of various incarnations of Janata Party in 1977, 1980, 1989, 1991, 1996, 1998, 1999, and 2004. He lost that seat only once in that span, in 1984 election. After his death, his son Neeraj Shekhar won the ensuing by-poll in 2008.

== Other Ministries ==
=== Minister of Information and Broadcasting (1990–1991) ===
Chandra Shekhar remained the Minister of Information and Broadcasting from 21 November 1990 to 21 June 1991 from Samajwadi Janata Party (Rashtriya) and at that time he was himself the Prime Minister of India. He was preceded by V. P. Singh and succeeded by P. V. Narasimha Rao to the position after he resigned from the position of Prime Minister due to loss of support of the alliances.

=== Minister of Home Affairs (1990–1991) ===
Like the Minister of I and B, he remained Minister of Home Affairs for the time period of 7 months. He was himself the Prime Minister at that time and was preceded by Mufti Mohammad Sayeed and succeeded by Shankarrao Chavan of Indian National Congress.

=== Minister of Defence (1990–1991) ===
Along with Ministry of Home Affairs and Information and Broadcasting, he also handled Ministry of Defence under him as the Prime Minister of India. He was Minister of Defence for a very short time of 7 months and didn't present the Defence budget. He was preceded by V. P. Singh and succeeded by P. V. Narasimha Rao as the Minister of Defence.

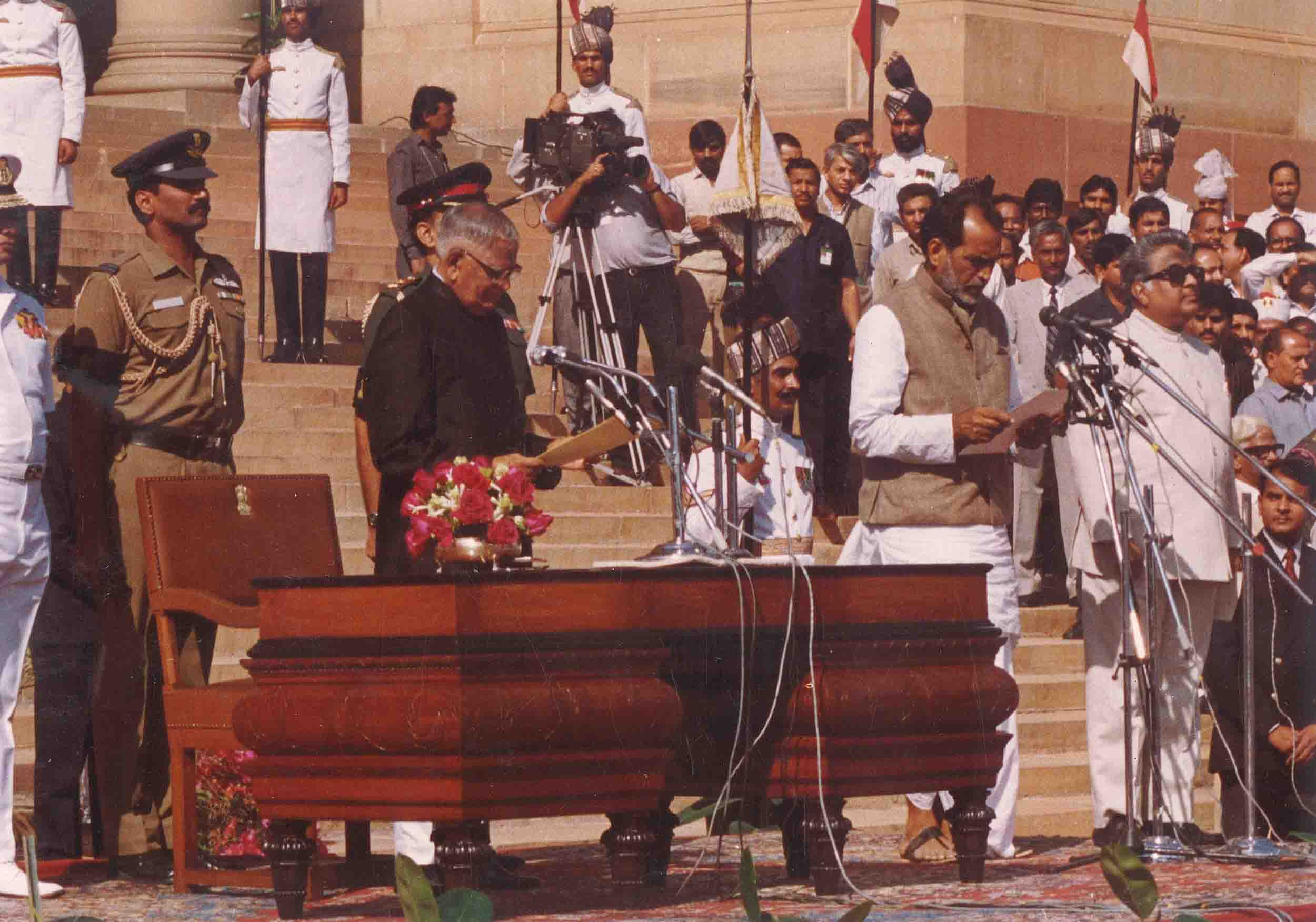
Chandra Sekhar being sworn in as Prime Minister of India at Rashtrapati Bhavan forecourt. He was the first prime minister to take the oath of office in the Rashtrapati Bhavan forecourt.

== Premiership (1990-91) ==
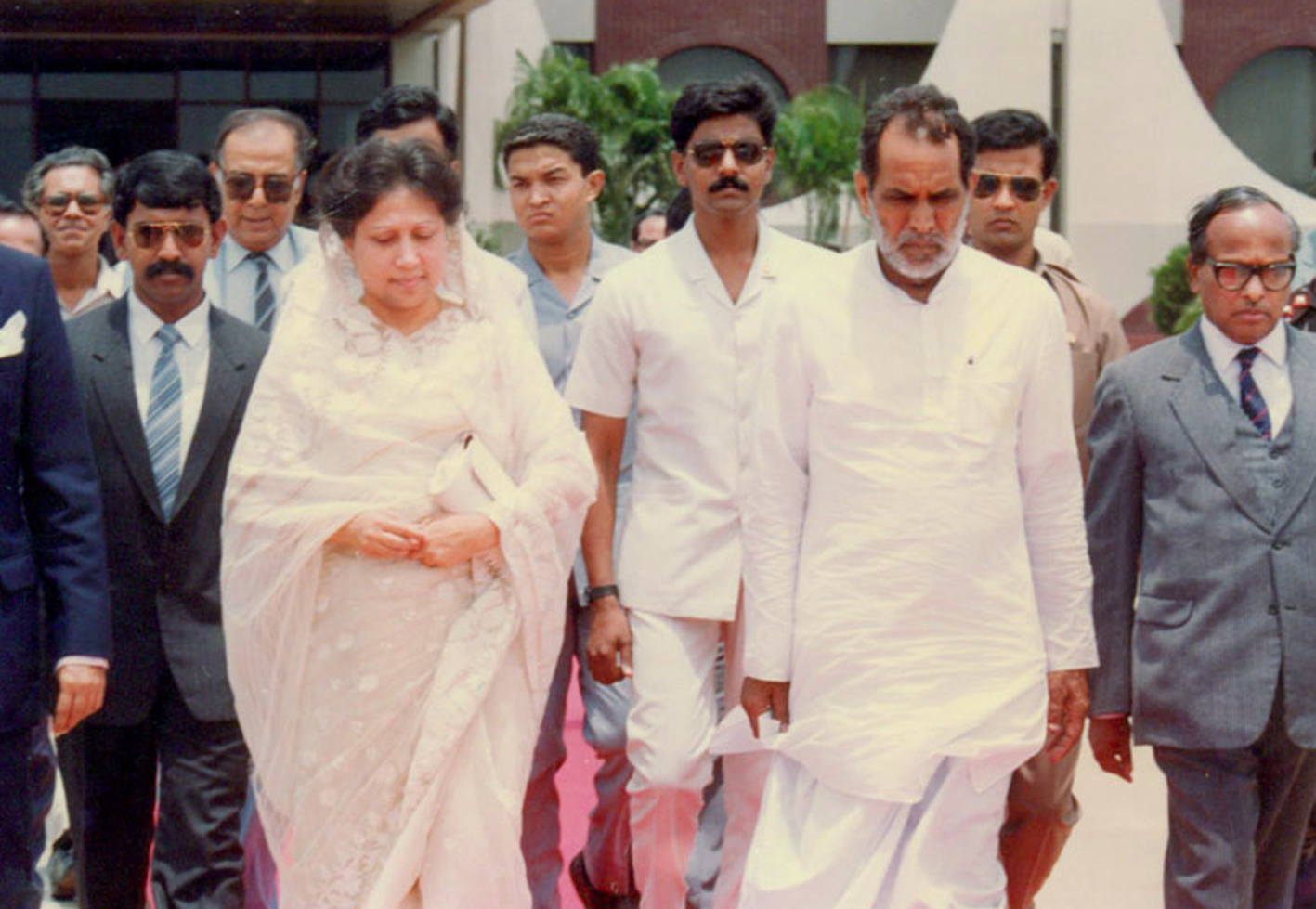
Mohammad Mosaddak Ali met with Prime Minister of India Chandra Shekhar at Zia International Airport in Dhaka

Chandra Shekhar was prime minister for seven months, the second shortest period after that of Charan Singh. Subramanian Swamy was instrumental in forming this government with the support of Congress. He also handled the portfolios of Defence and Home Affairs during this period. However, his government could not introduce a full budget because on 6 March 1991 Congress withdrew support during its formulation. As a result, Chandra Shekhar resigned the office of the prime minister after 15 days on 21 March.

Manmohan Singh was his Economic Advisor. Subramanian Swamy along with Manmohan Singh and Montek Singh Ahluwalia prepared a series of documents on economic liberalization but could not pass in parliament because Congress withdrew support. Jairam Ramesh in his book To the Brink and Back: India's 1991 Story has written that "Chandrashekhar's Cabinet Committee on Trade and Investment (CCTI) itself had on 11 March 1991 approved the new export strategy which contained the main elements of the 4 July package".

== Post-premiership ==
After handing the premiership to P. V. Narasimha Rao, Chandra Shekar's political importance was reduced, although he was able to retain his seat in the Lok Sabha for many years afterward.

== Election Contested ==
=== Lok Sabha ===
Year	Constituency	Party	Votes	%	Opponent	Opponent Party	Opponent Votes	%	Result	Margin	%
2004	Ballia	SJP(R)	270,136	43.6	Kapildeo Yadav	BSP	189,082	30.5	Won	81,054	13.1
1999	Ballia	SJP(R)	235,946	38.1	Ram Krishna Gopal	BJP	180,271	29.1	Won	55,675	9
1998	Ballia	SJP(R)	260,544	40.5	Ram Krishna Gopal	BJP	231,060	36	Won	29,484	4.5
1996	Ballia	SJP(R)	305,592	56.4	Jagannath Chowdhary	INC	118,987	22	Won	186,605	34.4
1991	Ballia	SJP(R)	213,066	44.7	Jagannath Chowdhary	INC	154,518	32.4	Won	58,548	12.3
1989	Ballia	JD	251,997	52.53	Jagannath Chowdhary	INC	161,016	33.57	Won	90,981	18.96
1984	Ballia	JP	172,044	40.04	Jagannath Chowdhary	INC	225,984	52.6	Lost	-53,940	-12.56
1980	Ballia	JP	159,901	41.37	Jagannath Chowdhary	INC(I)	136,313	35.27	Won	23,588	6.1
1977	Ballia	JP	262,641	72.42	Chandrika Prasad	INC	95,432	26.31	Won	167,209	46.11

=== Rajya Sabha ===
Position	Party	Constituency	From	To	Tenure
Member of Parliament, Rajya Sabha (1st Term)	PSP	Uttar Pradesh	3 April 1962	2 April 1968	5 years, 365 days
Member of Parliament, Rajya Sabha (2nd Term)	INC	Uttar Pradesh	3 April 1968	2 April 1974	5 years, 364 days
Member of Parliament, Rajya Sabha (3rd Term)	Ind.	Uttar Pradesh	3 April 1974	2 April 1980	2 years, 353 days (Elected to Lok Sabha on 22 March 1977)

== Death ==
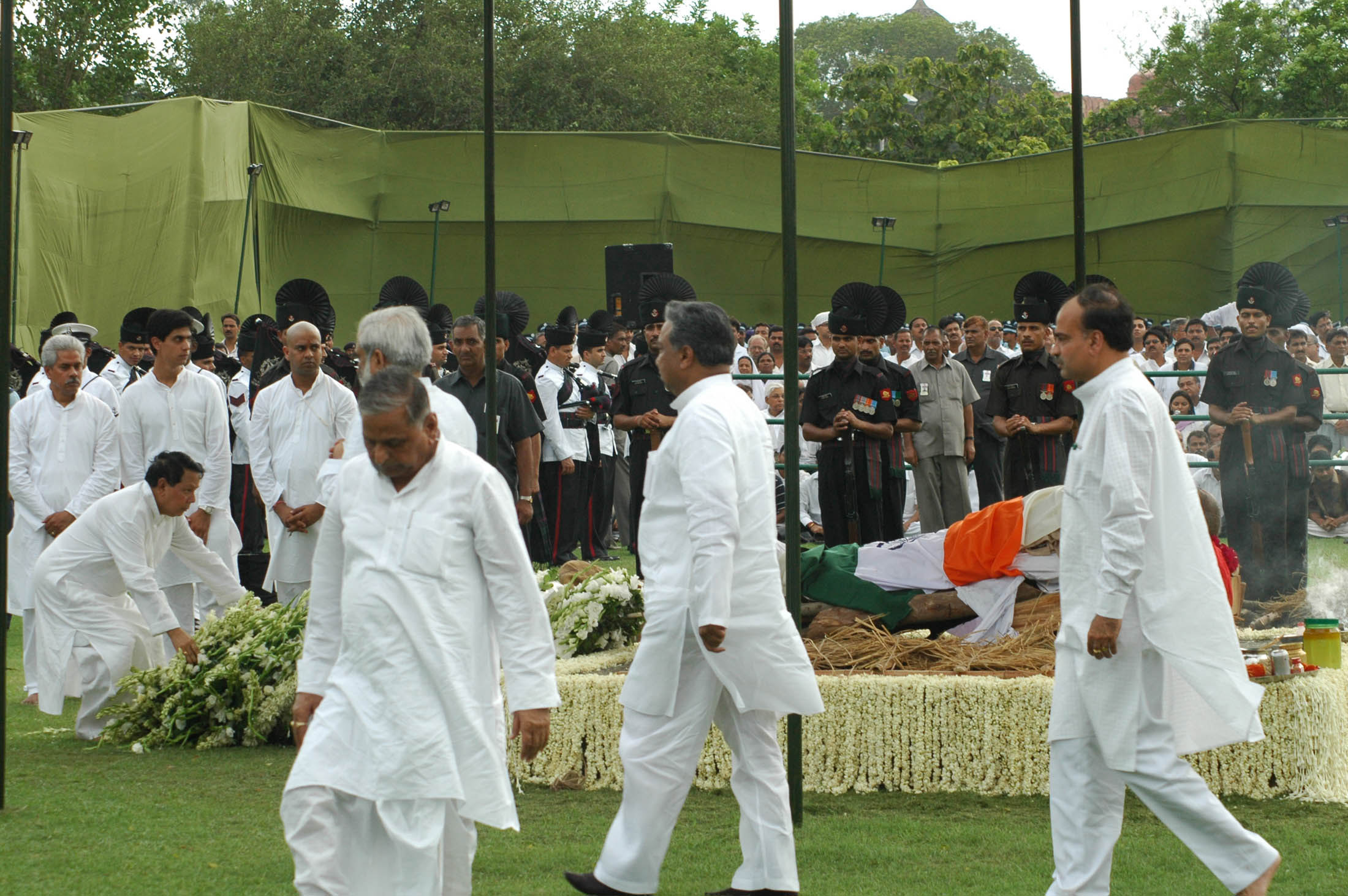
Priyaranjan Dasmunsi laying wreath at the mortal remains of the former Prime Minister, Shri Chandra Shekhar at the funeral pyre, in Delhi on 9 July 2007

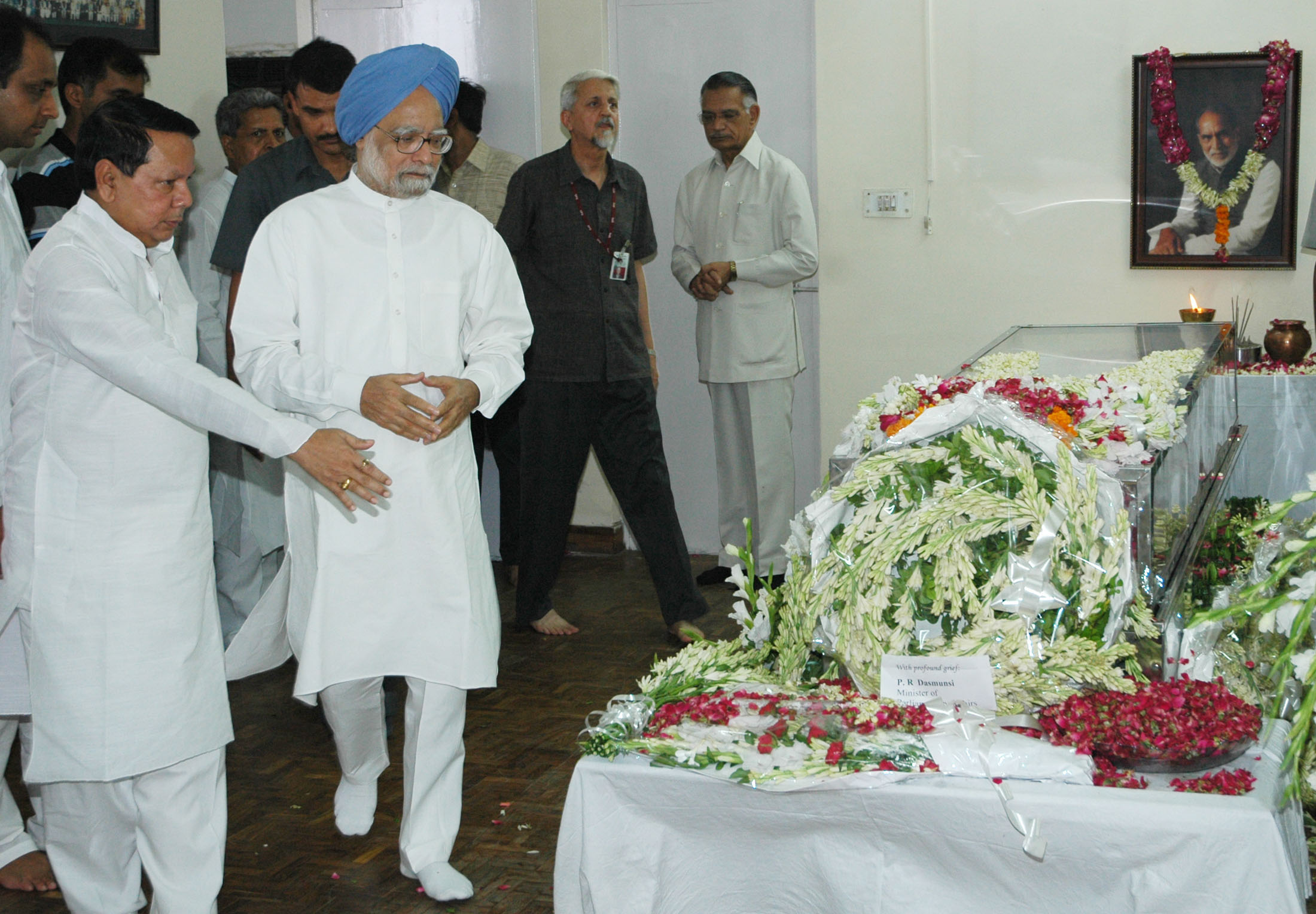
Prime Minister Dr. Manmohan Singh paying tribute to the mortal remains of the former Prime Minister Shri Chandra Shekhar, in New Delhi on 8 July 2007

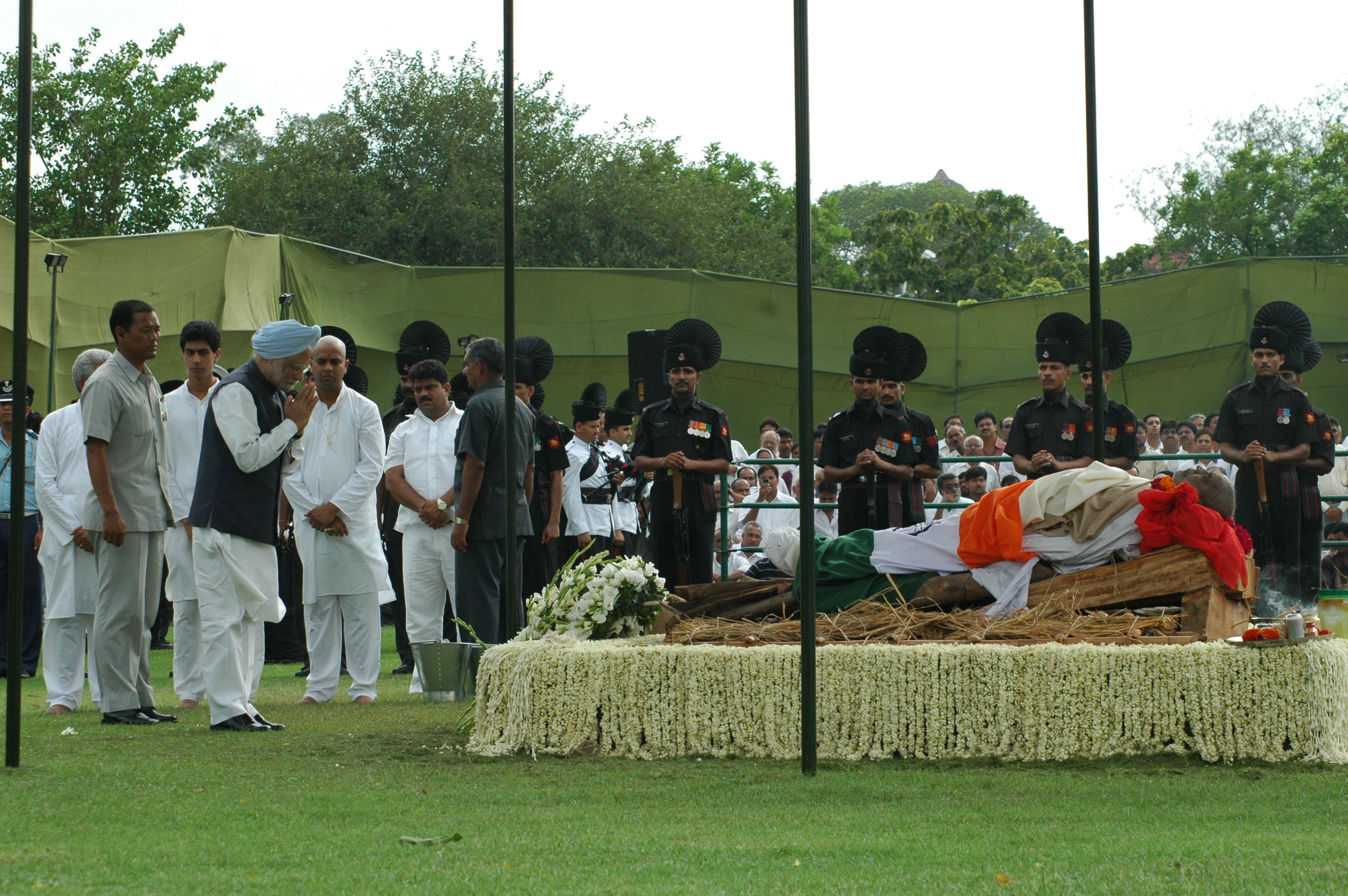
The Prime Minister, Dr. Manmohan Singh paying homage to the mortal remains of the former Prime Minister, Shri Chandra Shekhar at the funeral pyre, in Delhi on 9 July 2007

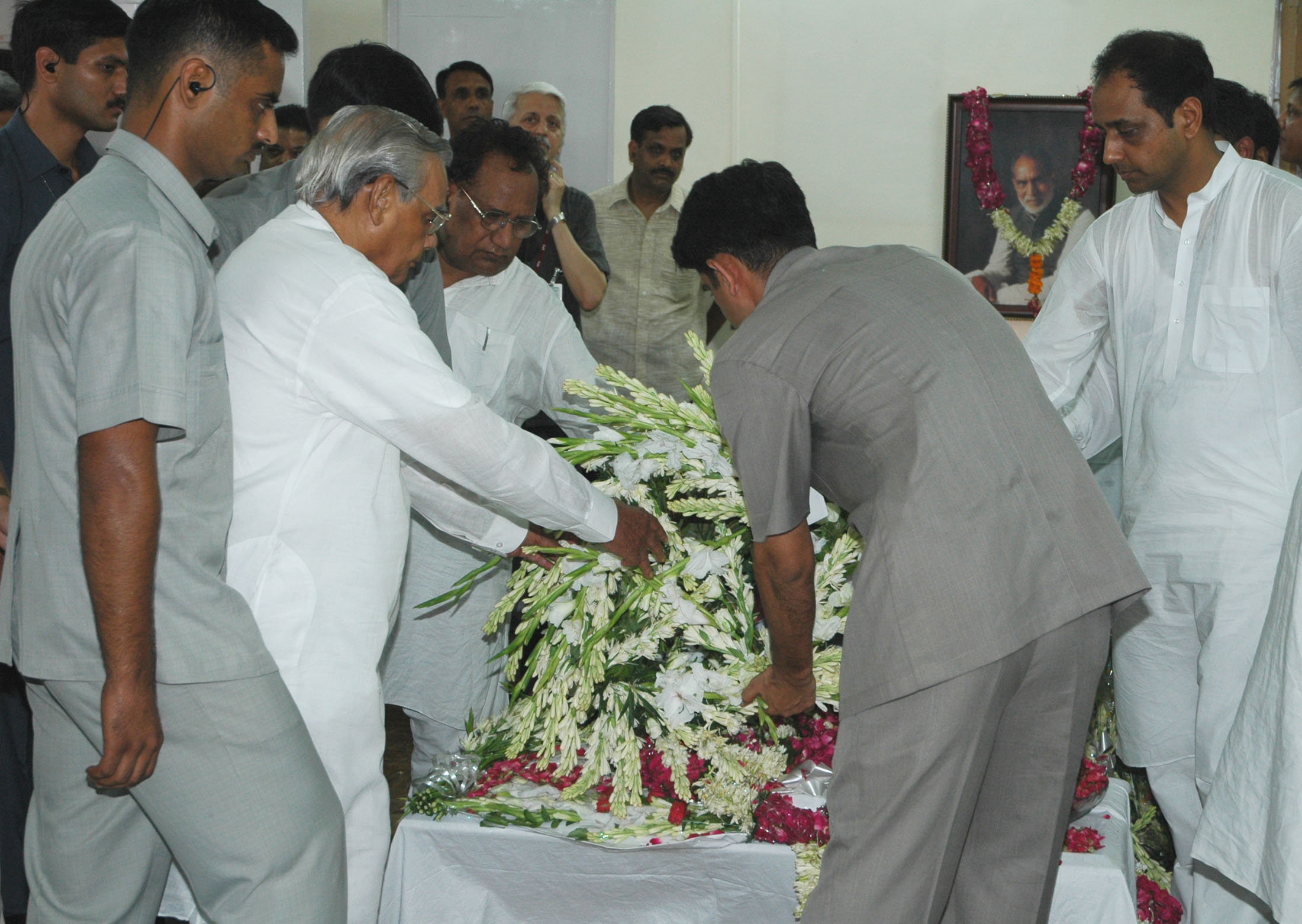
The former Prime Minister Shri Atal Bihari Vajpayee paying tribute to the mortal remains of the former Prime Minister Shri Chandra Shekhar, in New Delhi on 8 July 2007

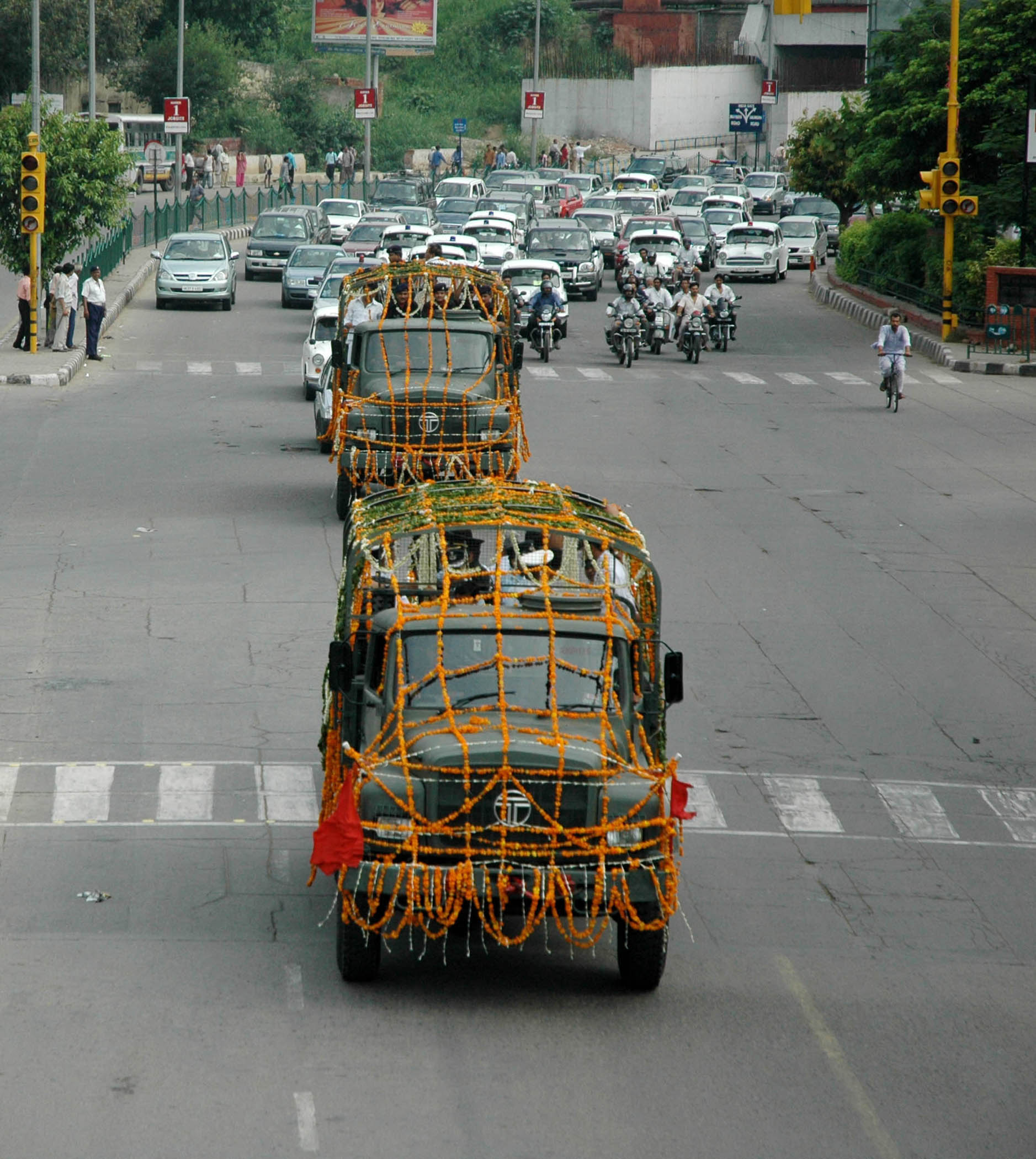
The carriage carrying the mortal remains of the former Prime Minister, Shri Chandra Shekhar making its way to Ekta Sthal for the state funeral, in Delhi on 9 July 2007

Chandra Shekhar died on 8 July 2007. He had been suffering with multiple myeloma for some time and had been in the Apollo Hospital at New Delhi since May. He was survived by two sons.

Politicians from across the spectrum of Indian parties paid tribute to him and the government of India declared seven days of state mourning. He was cremated with full state honours on a traditional funeral pyre at Jannayak Sthal, on the banks of the river Yamuna, on 10 July. In August, his ashes were immersed in the river Siruvani.

== Positions held ==
Timeline of political career
Year	Event
2004	Re-elected to 14th Lok Sabha (8th term)
2000–2001	Chairman, Committee on Ethics
1999	Re-elected to 13th Lok Sabha (7th term)
1998	Re-elected to 12th Lok Sabha (6th term)
1996	Re-elected to 11th Lok Sabha (5th term)
1991	Re-elected to 10th Lok Sabha (4th term)
1990–91	Prime Minister and in charge of various Ministries/Departments including: Defence, Home Affairs, Atomic Energy, Science and Technology, Ocean Development, Personnel, Public Grievances and Pensions, Electronics, Space, Information and Broadcasting, Industry, Labour, Welfare, Planning and Programme Implementation, External Affairs, Health and Family Welfare, Water Resources and Surface Transport
1989	Re-elected to 9th Lok Sabha (3rd term)
1980	Re-elected to 7th Lok Sabha (2nd term)
1977–78	President, Janata Party (J.P.)
1977	Elected to 6th Lok Sabha
1967	General Secretary, Congress Parliamentary Party (C.P.P.)
1962	Member, Rajya Sabha
1959–62	Member, National Executive, P.S.P.
1955	General Secretary, P.S.P., Uttar Pradesh
1952	Joint Secretary, P.S.P., Uttar Pradesh
1951	Secretary, Praja Socialist Party (P.S.P.), Distt. Ballia

== See also ==
- Pradhanmantri Sangrahalaya

Political offices
Preceded by V. P. Singh	Prime Minister of India; 1990–91	Succeeded by P. V. Narasimha Rao
Preceded by V. P. Singh	Minister of Defence; 1990–91	Succeeded by Sharad Pawar
Preceded by Mufti Mohammad Sayeed	Minister of Home Affairs; 1990–91	Succeeded by Shankarrao Chavan
