= Koth, Ballia =

Koth
- Village
- Location in Uttar Pradesh, India
- Coordinates: 26°05′N 84°00′E
- Country: India
- State: Uttar Pradesh
- District: Ballia District

Population (2011)
  - Total: 9,345

Languages
  - Official: Hindi
  - Additional official: Urdu
- Time zone: UTC+5:30 (IST)
- PIN: 221717
- Vehicle registration: UP

Koth is a village in the Ballia District of Uttar Pradesh, India. As of 2011 census, this village had a population of 9,345.
