= Akhil Bharatiya Kshatriya Mahasabha =

Indian social community organisation

- Abbreviation: ABKM
- Formation: 19 October 1897 (129 years ago)
- Founder: Raja Balwant Singh of Awaghar
- Type: Rajput Community Organization
- Headquarters: New Delhi
- Region served: India
- Key people: Mahender Singh Tanwar (National President)
- Affiliations: Rajputs

Akhil Bharatiya Kshatriya Mahasabha, also known as All India Kshatriya Mahasabha, was founded in the year 1897. The organization was formed to promote, protect, and fight for rights and interests of the Rajput community of the Indian society.

== Early years ==
After the Revolt of 1857, many Taluqdars and Rajput Estate Holders who supported the revolutionists or participated with them were compromised. The British impounded many of their lands and properties and they were taxed with heavy fines. Raja Hanumant Singh, the Chief of Kalakankar, was one such Taluqdar, who was dispossessed of his many properties for supporting the Revolt of 1857. Raja Hanumant Singh believed a pan-India organization was necessary to correct the injustice faced by their community. He founded the association in 1857 with other Taluqdars of Oudh and named it the Ram Dal. It was renamed Kshatriya Hitkarni Sabha in 1860. The association was formed to protect and fight for rights and interests of Rajput communities. In 1897, Kshatriya Mahasabha became the successor to the Kshatriya Hitkarni Sabha, under the leadership of Raja Balwant Singh of Awagarh with Thakur Umarao Singh of Kotla, Raja Rampal Singh of Kalakankar, and Raja Uday Pratap Singh of Bhinga. Akhil Bhartiya Kshatriya Mahasabha came into existence on 19 Oct 1897, creating a platform to promote the cause of the Kashatriyas and Rajputs

A newsletter called Rajput Monthly was launched in 1898. The association had its first conference in the Rajput Boarding House at Agra. Maharaja Sir Pratap Singh of Jammu & Kashmir sponsored the launching of an Urdu publication called the Rajput Gazette as a fortnightly from Lahore. In the early 1900s, princely states rulers and large zamindars started various schools and colleges in their territories, giving preference to students of the Kshatriya community.

After independence of India in 1947, the situation changed dramatically for the upper Kshatriya caste and its influential members. The princely states were merged into the Union of India, Zamindari was also abolished, and the association was directionless. In 1955, the association was revived at a meeting in Ujjain under Babu Ram Narayan, a prominent Rajput politician from Bihar, who was elected its president the association got fresh leadership. The centenary celebration of the association was held in 1987 at New Delhi under president-ship of Raja Digvijaysinhji Prajapsinhji Jhala.

== Activities ==
=== Re-conversion of Muslim Rajputs ===
In 1922 under chairmanship of Raja Nahar Singh, the organization decided to bring four lakh-converted Muslim Rajputs back into the Hindu fold by way of a purification ritual. The historic meeting where the decision was taken was held at Agra on 31 December 1922. Later on, under guidance of Madan Mohan Malviya, thousands were brought back in to the Hindu fold after purification. Inspired by this pioneering effort of the Kshatriya Mahasabha, Akhil Bharatiya Hindu Mahasabha (which was founded by Madan Mohan Mavaiy) also passed similar resolution a few months later to bring back converted Muslims into the Hindu fold by purification rites.

=== Role in Resolution of Jagirdari Act ===
During 1952–1954, the organization played a pivotal role in respect to the Jagirdari Case. They filed writs in the Supreme Court of India with respect to the Resumption of Jagirdari Act. The Supreme Court of India accepted the role of Mahasabha as a central co-ordinator in the case. The Prime Minister of India, Jawaharlal Nehru, advised Govind Vallabh Pant, the earstwhile Chief Minister of Uttar Paradesh, to negotiate with Akhil Bharatiya Kshatriya Mahasabha to end the stalemate.

=== Demanding Reservation on Economic Basis ===
In 1980, the organization demanded that reservation should be given on economic basis rather than on caste basis. Again in the year 2001, a memorandum containing lacs of signatures was submitted to Hon'ble President of India through District Collectors, demanding reservation on economic basis rather than on caste basis. A nationwide rath yatra from Jammu to Kanyakumari demanding reservation on economic basis rather than on caste basis was flagged off in October 2010, which ended in March 2011.

=== Successful agitation for declaration of birthday of Maharana Pratap as public holiday ===
In 2013, Akhil Bharatiya Kshatriya Mahasabha started an agitation and demanded Chief Minister of Uttar Pradesh, Akhilesh Yadav, to announce a public holiday on 9 May, the birthday of legendary warrior Maharana Pratap, similar to Rajasthan and Madhya Pradesh, where 9 May is a public holiday. After continuous efforts of two years, the Uttar Pradesh government in 2015 declared Maharana Pratap Jayanti a public holiday on 9 May every year.

=== Raising Issues of Atrocities on Rajputs ===
The organization today is active in raising issues related to the Thakur and Rajput community. For example, in 2004, they launched a major campaign for release of various Thakur caste members jailed by the Mayavati government. The organization has a strong presence in Bihar.

The organization is known for taking up the rights, issues, and cases related to Rajput and Kshatriya members on its own or together with other Kshatriya organizations in India like Karni Sena, Hadoti Mahasabha.

=== Publication of books ===
The organization also helps publish research books on Rajput history and kings, like Prithiviraj Chauhan and Maharana Pratap.

The Kshtra Dharma magazine published by the organization has been edited by historians like Raghuvir Sinh and Hindu saints like Krishnananda Saraswati.

== Past Presidents ==
Several have headed the organization since its inception:

- Raja Balwant Singh of Awagadh - 1897
- Maharaja Sahab Rampal Singh of Kalakankar - 1899
- Maharaja Sir Partap Singh of Jammu & Kashmir - 1902 & 1913
- Lt. Col. Partap Singh of Idar - 1903
- General Maharaja Sir Ganga Singh of Bikaner - 1904
- Raja Kaushal Kishor Singh of Manjholi - 1906
- Raja Pratap Bahadur Singh of Partapgarh -1907
- Maharaja Sir Jaswant Singh of Sailana - 1911
- Maharaja Dhalip Singh of Sailana - 1920
- Maharajadhiraj Sir Nahar Singhji of Shahapura - 1922
- Rao Sahab Gopal Singh Kharwa of Ajmer - 1924
- Maharaja Sawaj Jai Singhji of Alwar - 1925
- Maharaja Sahab Sajjan Singh of Ratlam - 1929
- Maharaja Dhalip Singh of Sailana - 1930
- Maharaja Ram Singh of Orchha - 1933
- Kunwar Saheb Sir Vijay Partap Singh of Bagla -1940
- Maharaja Ram Ranvijay Partap Singh Bahadur of Dumraon - 1941
- Maharaja Kumar Vijay Anand of Motihari - 1942
- Raja Kamakhya Narayan Singh of Ramgarh - 1942 & 1953
- Maharaja Yadvendra Singh Judeo of Panna - 1946
- Maharaja Sawai Tej Singh of Alwar - 1947
- Thakur Sahab Col. Maan Singhji Bhati of Jodhpur - 1948
- Babu Ram Narayan Singh of Hazaribagh - 1955
- Maharawal Lakshman Singh of Dungarpur - 1960
- Raja Shripal Singh of Singramau, Jaunpur - 1986
- Raja Dr. Digvijay Singhji of Wankaner - 1997
- Sh. Mahender Singh Tanwar - 2019
