= Balwant Singh of Awagarh =

Indian zamindar and philanthropist

Balwant Singh, Raja of Awagarh, CIE, OBE (1852–1909) was a noted zamindar and philanthropist from Awagarh belonging to the Jadaun Rajputs.

He was noted for his philanthropy in field of education. He purchased land and started Rajput High School in 1885 at Agra with a donation of Rs. 12,00,000, which has now grown into Raja Balwant Singh College. He made an further endowment of Rs. 9,30,000 in year 1909 before his death for the college. He also donated more than 100 acres in Agra for agriculture known as Khandari Farm, attached to Rajput High School. He was a close friend of Sir Harcort Butler, who later became Governor of United Provinces and we can find mention of it in speeches of Sir Harcourt.

Balwant Singh was also a close friend and associate of Madan Mohan Malviya. In 1898, he was party to the delegation led by Malviyaji along with Maharaja Pratap Narayan Singh of Ayodhya, Raja Ramprasad Singh of Mandu, Sri Krishna Joshi, Dr. Sunderlal to Sir Antony McDonald, then deputy Viceroy requesting for inclusion of Hindi as one of the working languages in courts and government documents. It was due to their efforts Hindi was added as one of the working languages in government documents and courts. He along with Thakur Umarao Singhji of Kotla, Raja Uday Pratap Singh of Bhinga was instrumental in founding of Akhil Bharatiya Kshatriya Mahasabha in year 1897 He also presided over the Mahasabha for year 1897. He died in 1909.

Raja Balwant Singh College is named after him.
