= Brajesh Singh =

Indian politician (1900–1966)

- Predecessor: Raja Ramesh Singh
- Born: c. 1909
- Died: 31 October 1966 (aged 57–58)
- Burial: Kalakankar
- Spouse: Kunwarani Laxmi Devi; Leela (an Austrian woman); Svetlana Alliluyeva
- Issue: Asha Pal; Usha Pande; Victor Singh
- Father: Raja Ramesh Singh
- Religion: Hinduism

Brajesh Singh, Kunwar Brijesh Singh or Brajesh Singh Lal; c. 1909 (Note: Svetlana once stated in her memoir Only one year that Singh was older than her by seventeen years.Since she was born in 1926, that would make 1909 as his possible birth year.) – 31 October 1966) was an Indian politician belonging to the Communist Party of India (CPI). He hailed from the royal family of Kalakankar near Allahabad, and his nephew Dinesh Singh was a minister in the Indian cabinet.

His first wife was Kunwarani Laxmi Devi, followed by Leela, an Austrian woman with whom he had a son named Victor Singh. Victor later moved to England, where he became a photographer. In 1963, while recuperating from bronchitis, Singh met Svetlana Alliluyeva, the only daughter of Joseph Stalin. The two fell in love while Singh was critically ill with bronchiectasis and emphysema. The romance deepened while the couple were recuperating in Sochi near the Black Sea.

Singh returned to Moscow in 1965 to work as a translator, but he and Alliluyeva were not allowed to marry. He died the following year, on 31 October 1966. In an interview on 26 April 1967, Alliluyeva said that she considered Singh to be her husband but that Aleksei Kosygin never allowed them to legally marry.

== Biography ==
Singh was born in Rajput family to Raja Ramesh Singh, the taluqdar royal of the Kalakankar. His birthdate is uncertain. His father Raja Rampal Singh was a founding member of the Indian National Congress (INC) and his grandfather Lal Pratap Singh was a leader in the Indian Rebellion of 1857.

Singh studied English at a college in Lucknow. He later moved to Berlin, to pursue an engineering education. In 1928, M. N. Roy was expelled from the Communist International, he then moved to Berlin and from there he enlisted the help of several Indian students. Singh was one of those students who became an active communist and began closely working with him (Note: other students working closely with Roy included Tayab Shaikh, Anadi Bhaduri, and Sundar Kabadi.) to establish the Group of Oppositional Indian Communists that would be affiliated with the Communist Party of Germany Opposition and INC. The primary reason for the establishment of the organisation was to protest the Ultra-leftist attitude of the Communist International in India. While in India, Roy also suggested that Indian communists were distancing themselves from the Nationalist movement.

During the course of this campaign, Singh served as Roy's right-hand man. He also financed Roy's health care in Switzerland and his trip to India. However in 1931 when Roy was arrested in India, Singh decided to relinquish Roy's principles and defected back to the orthodox communist stronghold in Europe. When he arrived in London in September 1932, he came across his brother Raja Awadhesh Singh, who had been regularly commuting from London to Dublin. Brajesh's previous passport was impounded in India, so he had been to Ireland using his brother's passport. While he was crossing over to Ireland, the Indian Political Intelligence was actively monitoring Singh's activities.

It will be seen from independent information that BRAJESH SINGH LAL and his brother are actively supporting the Indian-Irish Independence League in Dublin, which is under the control of the group composed of V. J. Patel, R. B. Lotwala and I. K. Yajnik.

After arriving in Dublin, Singh applied for an Irish Free State emergency passport that would be valid for five years, which provided him with ample time in Europe. Later he managed to make his way back to Berlin. The Indian Political Intelligence Office failed to prove his fraudulent use of passports in order to revoke his emergency passport, and concluded that it was better to have him outside India, because his financial assets in support of the Communist Party of India would cause difficulties for the British Raj. His file was closed in the mid-1930s. Singh's nephew Dinesh Singh become the successor after his father, Raja Awadhesh Singh.

Singh's first wife was Kunwarani Laxmi Devi, followed by Leela, an Austrian Jewish woman from Vienna whom Singh married during the Second World War. Singh and Leela both fled to India to escape Nazi persecution, where they lived for 16 years. After the war, Leela moved to England with their son Victor. Singh followed her, but due to his inability to find work in England, he returned back to India after divorcing her. While there, his son Victor became a photographer.

=== Stay in Soviet Union ===
In October 1963, while recuperating from bronchitis at Kuntsevo Hospital, Singh met Svetlana Alliluyeva, who was there for a tonsillectomy. At the time, Svetlana was reading a biography on Mahatma Gandhi and wanted to ask an Indian like Singh about the subject. After bumping into each other in the corridors, they took a seat on a nearby couch and had keen conversation for an hour.

A romantic relationship followed. As per the terms of his visa, Singh's return to India was scheduled after he was discharged from the Kuntsevo Hospital. However, he and Svetlana came up with a new plan, where Singh would go to Russia from India and work as a translator of Russian texts into Hindi. He left for India in December 1963 and went to Russia in March 1965. He landed in Sheremetyevo Airport on 7 April and was welcomed by Svetlana and her son Joseph Alliluyev. Joseph's remarks regarding meeting Singh is quoted below:

Singh was a nice sort of person, cultured, kind. . . . It was very enjoyable to be with him. . . . He was calm and patient and also knew how to look upon things with a certain sense of humour. . . . He came to live with us, and to Katya (Note: Yekaterina "Katya" Zhdanova (b. 1950) was the daughter of Svetlana and Yuri Zhdanov and worked as a volcanologist in Kamchatka) and he was our mother's husband, and we treated him with respect. I think she was happy.

Svetlana had hastily married three times before making the urgent decision to marry Singh due to his critical health; Singh also had refused to return to India without her, and she was required to be his wife to travel with him. To register for marriage due to being a foreigner, he and Svetlana had visited Moscow office on 3 May. The next day Svetlana was ordered to summon to Alexei Kosygin's office in Kremlin. After arriving in the office which once belonged to her father, she was asked why she had stopped attending party meetings. Svetlana answered that "she had to take care of her family and now she had a sick husband." Angered at the word husband, Kosygin is recorded to have said about Singh:

What have you cooked up? You, a young healthy woman, a sportswoman, couldn't you have found someone here, I mean someone young and strong? What do you want with this old sick Hindu? No, we are all positively against it, positively against it!

Svetlana was officially disallowed the right to register to marry Singh. Due to the turmoil and unrest in the Gorky institution due to it publishing anti-Soviet propaganda and organising political rallies where Svetlana worked. Singh was isolated after falling under the government's scrutiny, his Indian friends in Moscow stopped visiting him. Indian Ambassador to Moscow, Triloki Nath Kaul and Ambassador of the United Arab Republic, Mohammed Murad Ghaleb were the only friends who continued to visit. Dinesh Singh, his nephew, who under the pro-Soviet government headed by Indira Gandhi, had become the deputy minister of the Department of Foreign Affairs stopped responding to him. Only Suresh Singh, his brother, continued to write from Kalakankar.

The translation work Singh did for the publishing house Progress also came under the scrutiny of Vladimir N. Pavlov, the English Division's chief editor and former translator at Yalta and correspondent to Churchill under Stalin. It had now become increasingly clear to Singh that political machinations were trying to disrepute him as being incompetent so that his legal right to stay in the USSR could be revoked. Singh soon became critically ill. After being admitted and wrongly diagnosed with tuberculosis at Intourist Polyclinic, he was taken back into Kuntsevo Hospital by Svetlana. She began spending her entire day with him at the hospital, where they talked about India and sometimes read the Vedic hymns. Singh was also visited by his ambassador friends during his stay at the hospital. But despite all the visits made, each time he became more ill.

=== Singh's death ===
On Sunday 30 October, after being visited by his friends and colleagues from the publishing house, Singh had a dream of a white bullock pulling a cart. Afterward he told Svetlana that in India, the dream was considered as an omen of approaching death, "Sveta, I know that I will die today." At 7 A.M, Monday, 31 October 1966, Singh while pointing at his heart and then at his head, said that he felt something throbbing, and then he died at his home. Singh's death was quick and calm. Svetlana did not weep at Singh's death and shortly afterward she contacted his Indian friends who lived in Russia. When Singh's friends arrived, they burned sandalwood, recited verses from the Bhagavad Gita, and the next day they took Singh's body to the crematorium.

=== Funeral ===
Svetlana had made a resolution that she would personally immerse Singh's ashes into the Ganga. She was given special permission by Kosygin to go to India on a condition that she would avoid contact with foreign press. Dinesh Singh, his nephew, wrote to Svetlana, stating that she was invited to stay at his house and that he had managed to secure a funeral in traditional manner. Although her passport for India was issued on 11 November. Dinesh Singh requested her to delay her visit until next month, on 12 December, when he would be free from parliamentary work.

After landing at Lucknow airport, they drove to Raj Bhavan, the palace of the royal family of Kalakankar. After their arrival, the urn containing Singh's ashes was handed over to Suresh Singh, who led a group of men onto the sandy shore. From there boats sailed to the middle part of the Ganges, where the ashes were slowly immersed per Hindu customs, Svetlana along with other women observed from the terrace since only men were allowed to carry the ashes.

=== Namesake hospital ===
You know, what does the medical help mean for a large rural area, where thousands of people—women and children—have no doctor. This hospital will provide for them a free treatment. It makes me feel perfectly satisfied that after all—I have done something for the real people.

— Svetlana Alliluyeva, in a letter to Joan Kennan, dated Oct. 29, 1968

Brajesh Singh Memorial Hospital building now serves as a private school due to Svetlana's inability to provide funds for it during her financial crisis.
