= Rampal =

Rampal or Ram Pal may refer to:

== People ==
=== Given name ===
- Ramapala, emperor of the Pala dynasty of medieval India
- Ram Pal Rajwanshi (born 1958), Indian politician
- Ram Pal Singh (1922–?), Indian politician from Uttar Pradesh
- Ram Pal Verma (born 1959), Indian politician
- Rampal (spiritual leader) (born 1951), Indian Spiritual leader
- Rampal Chahar (born 1989), Indian Paralympic high jumper
- Rampal Singh Gonda (born 1937), Indian politician
- Rampal Majra (born 1954), Indian politician
- Rampal Meghwal, Indian politician
- Rampal Singh (disambiguation)
  - Raja Rampal Singh (1849–1909), ruler of Kalakankar estate of Oudh in British India
  - Rampal Singh (INC politician) (born 1976), Indian politician from Madhya Pradesh
  - Rampal Singh (Madhya Pradesh politician) (born 1956), Indian politician
  - Rampal Singh (Uttar Pradesh politician) (born 1930), Indian politician
- Rampal Upadhyay (born 1935), Indian politician
- Rampal Yadav (born 1964), Indian politician

=== Surname ===
- Arjun Rampal (born 1972), Indian model and actor
- Jean-Pierre Rampal (1922–2000), French flautist and son of Joseph Rampal
- Joseph Rampal (1898–1983), French flautist

== Places ==
- Rampal Upazila, an upazila (sub-district) of Bagerhat District, Bangladesh
  - Rampal Union, Rampal
  - Rampal Power Station
  - Rampal Village, Munshigonj
