= Raja Balwant Singh College =

College in Bichpuri, Agra, India

Raja Balwant Singh College, Agra
- Type: Government Aided
- Established: 1885
- Affiliations: Dr. Bhimrao Ambedkar University & Dr. A.P.J. Abdul Kalam Technical University
- Location: Agra, Uttar Pradesh, India; 27.2005998°N 77.994588°E
- Website: rbscollegeagra.edu.in & fetrbs.org

Raja Balwant Singh College is located at Bichpuri, Agra, Uttar Pradesh, India. The college is affiliated to Dr. Bhimrao Ambedkar University, Agra and Dr. A.P.J. Abdul Kalam Technical University, Lucknow.

The college has its beginning as a small boarding house for the Rajput community in 1885, before becoming a high school in 1899, an Intermediate College in 1928, and a Degree College in 1940. It is the first college in India to award a postgraduate degree in agriculture.

RBS College has eight faculties – Arts, Commerce, Education, Science, Agriculture, Engineering pharmacy and Technology, and Management and Computer Application, and six campuses – three in Agra itself besides Bichpuri, Mathura and Awagarh.

== History ==
Established in 1885, Raja Balvant Singh College owes its existence to Raja Balwant Singh of Awagarh who enabled the institution to grow as one of the oldest and biggest colleges of Uttar Pradesh.

Raja Balwant Singh College, formerly known as Balwant Rajput College, was started with the help of Raja Balwant Singh of Awagarh Estate, Etah, Uttar Pradesh. It started in 1878 as Rajput Boarding House for education and upliftment of Rajputs of India. In 1885, it was upgraded as Balwant Rajput High School in 1899, with Col. Dobson and Sir E.H. Forsyth as headmasters, and Rajput community given preference.

In 1949 R.K. Singh started the Rural Engineering Institute at Bichpuri. A research lab for space science and seismo-electromagnetics is running on the Bichpuri campus and headed by Dr. Birbal Singh.

== Notable alumni ==
- Mulayam Singh Yadav
- Ram Gopal Yadav
- Shilendra Kumar Singh, IAS and Ex-Governor of Rajasthan
- Raj Babbar (Actor and Politician)
- Panjab Singh, former DG-ICAR and Secretary DARE
- Mangala Rai, former DG-ICAR and Secretary DARE
