= Ikauna =

- Town
- Location in Uttar Pradesh, India Ikauna (India)
- Coordinates: 27.55°N 81.97°E
- Country: India
- State: Uttar Pradesh
- District: Shrawasti
- Elevation: 108 m (354 ft)

Population (2011)
  - Total: 14,869

Languages
  - Official: Hindi
- Time zone: UTC+5:30 (IST)
- Vehicle registration: up
- Website: up.gov.in
- Ikauna is well nourished by the nature, and full with social harmony.

Ikauna is a town and nagar panchayat in the Shrawasti district in the Indian state of Uttar Pradesh. It is closely attached to the Shrawasti. There are five blocks in the Shrawasti district: Ikauna, Jamunha, Sirsiya, Gilaula, and Bhinga.

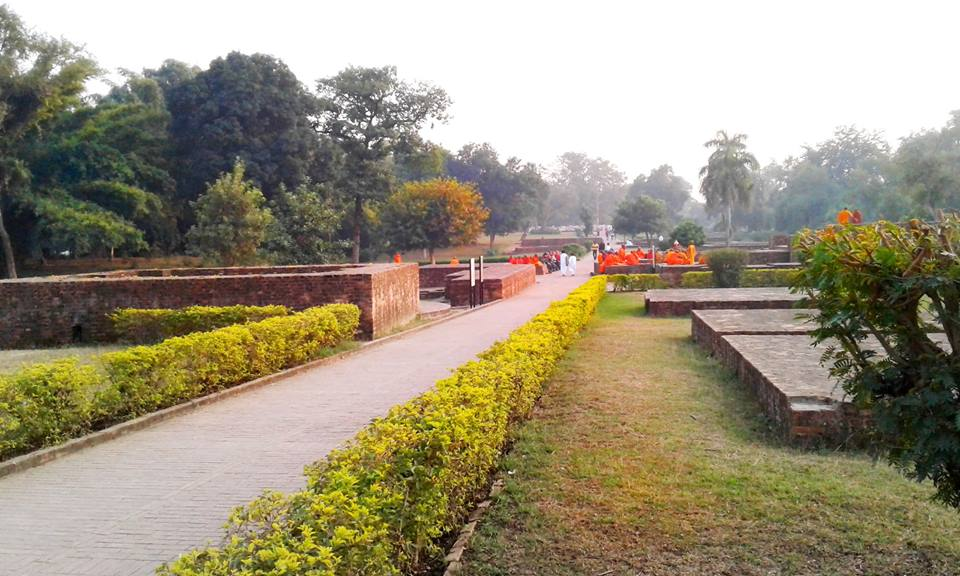
Ikauna Shrawasti

== Geography ==
Ikauna is located at 27.55°N 81.97°E. It has an average elevation of 109 metres (357 feet). It is near to Shrawasti (where Mahatma Gautam Buddha spent 11 years).

== Educational institutes ==
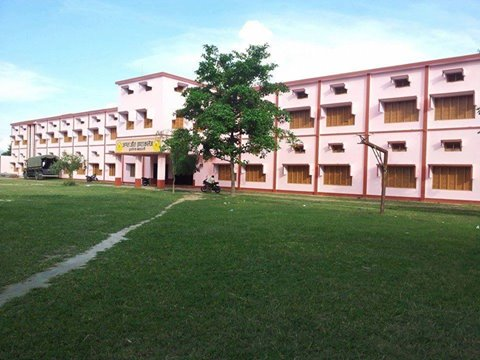
Jagat Jeet Inter College, Ikauna

There are several educational institutes in this district:

*Subhash Chandra Bose Inter College

*Moon And Sun Junior High school

- Sunshine Public School, Bypass Road. Ikauna Shrawasti
- Mahamaya Govt degree college
- Jagat Jeet Inter College
- Swami Vivekananda Inter college
- Mahamaya Rajkiya Balika Inter College
- Madarsa islamia furqania ahle sunnat ikauna

== Demographics ==
As of 2011, the census in India determined Ikauna had a population of 14,869. A majority of the town is made up of males, and a significant amount of the population is Muslim.
