= Souhardya De =

Indian author and columnist

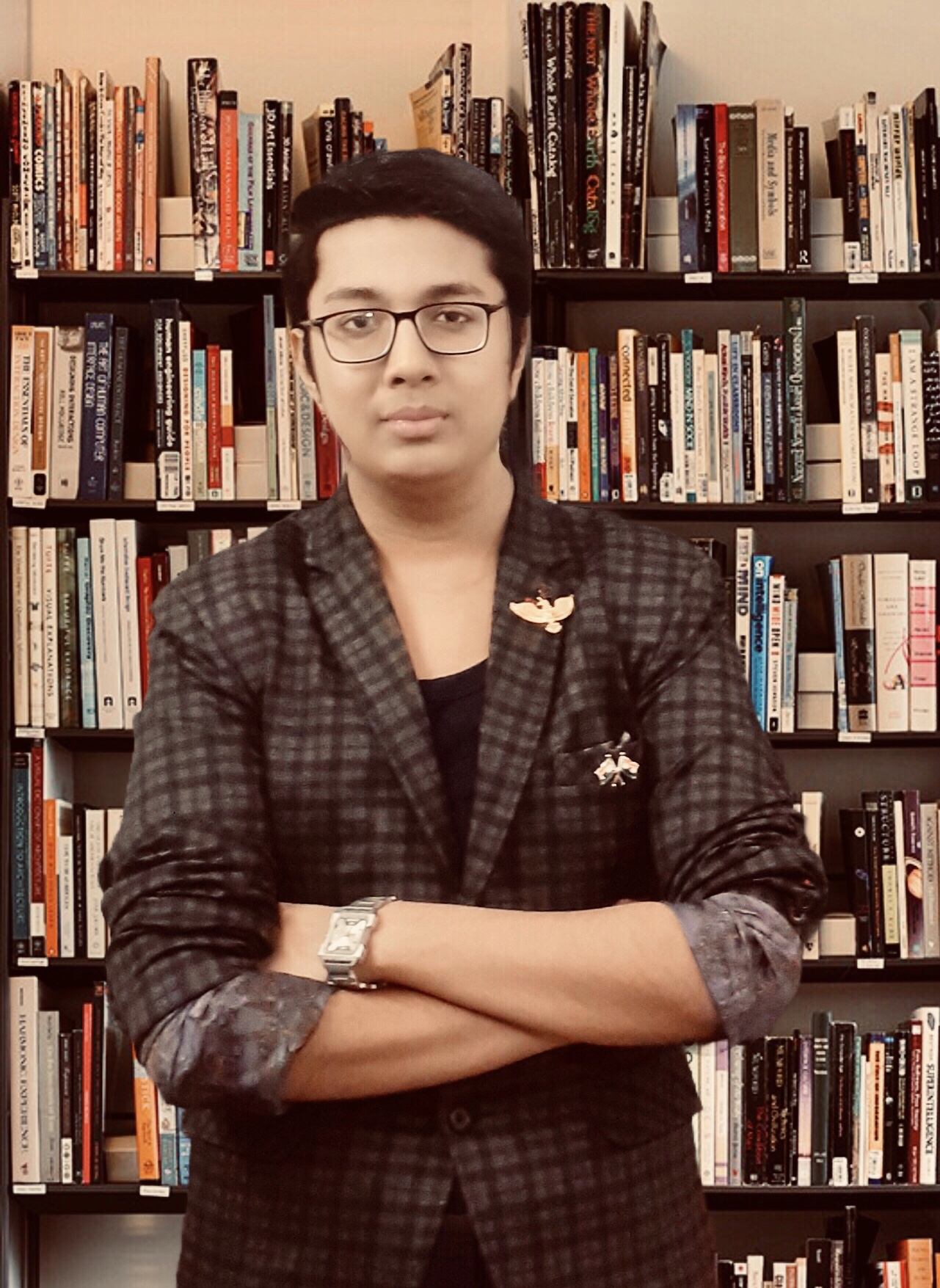
- De at an event in 2020
- Born: 9 January 2004 (age 22); Midnapore, West Bengal
- Education: Vidyasagar Shishu Niketan (CISCE affiliation) University of Cambridge University of Bristol
- Occupations: Author, columnist and podcaster
- Family: Mallick Bari (Midnapore)
- Honours: Pradhan Mantri Rashtriya Bal Puraskar 2021
- Website: www.souhardyade.co.in

Souhardya De (born 9 January 2004) is an Indian writer, columnist, and commentator from Midnapore, West Bengal. He is a recipient of the Pradhan Mantri Rashtriya Bal Puraskar, a civilian award for Indian citizens under the age of 18, in 2021. He is a Think Big scholar at the University of Bristol and a Don Lavoie Fellow in political economy at the Mercatus Center. De was one of the young authors commissioned by the Government of India to commemorate Lal Pratap Singh on the occasion of India’s 75th anniversary of Independence.

== Personal life ==
De pursued high school studies at the Vidyasagar Shishu Niketan in Midnapore, West Bengal, graduating in July, 2022. He did an undergraduate certificate in History from the University of Cambridge Professional and Continuing Education with a bursary. Later, he was awarded a Think Big scholarship for his undergraduate education in History at the University of Bristol, where he also worked as a student fundraiser.

His father, Shakti Prasad De, is a professor in the faculty of history at Midnapore College and his mother, Jayati De, is a teacher at a government school in West Bengal. De is a member of the erstwhile aristocratic Mallick Bari family.

== Career ==
He was a columnist for the Sunday Guardian and a podcaster, hosting a show called Cosmographia: The Graeco Romans, the Egyptians and Us. In 2021, Souhardya was one of the recipients of the PM-YUVA Fellowship, a stipend for young authors writing about the Indian independence movement, announced by the Ministry of Education. His book Pratap Jung: The Ultimate Sacrifice was published by the National Book Trust as part of the PM-YUVA series in 2023.

In foreign policy, De has worked with the Hudson Institute, where he was associated with the South Asia centre. As a policy commentator, he has also written in The SAIS Review of International Affairs, the Critical Asian Studies, and the Global Taiwan Institute, among other places. In 2024, De also briefly worked on a research stint at the University of Dhaka in Bangladesh.

== Bibliography ==
- 2017 - Scion Of Suryavansh: The Ramayana in English (Poetry). Self Published. 2017. ISBN 9781545262658.
- 2019 - The Chronicles of Suryavansh: The Rise and Fall of the Suryavanshis. Self Published. 2019. ISBN 9781797920498.
- 2023 - Pratap Jung: The Ultimate Sacrifice. PM-YUVA Series. National Book Trust. 2023. ISBN 978-93-549-1489-8.

== Honours and awards ==
- Inducted to the Science Olympiad Foundation Hall of Fame in 2019.
- Nominated for the 2020 International Children's Peace Prize from the KidsRights Foundation in Amsterdam, for his educational philanthropy.
- Pradhan Mantri Rashtriya Bal Puraskar by the Ministry of Women and Child Development, Government of India in 2021.
