= Udai Pratap Singh of Bhinga =

Zamindar and philanthropist

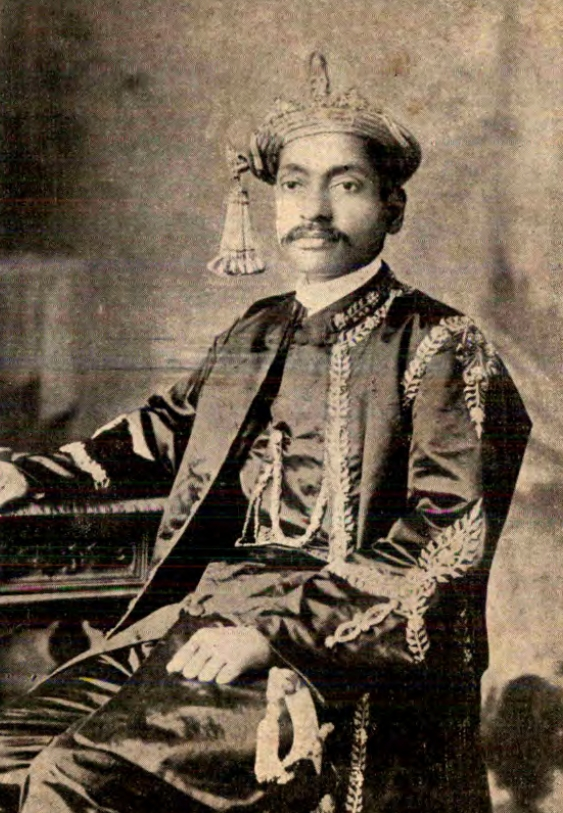

Raja Uday Pratap Singh, Raja of Bhinga, C.S.I. (3 September 1850 – 1913) was a noted zamindar and philanthropist from Bhinga.

== Family and education ==
He succeeded his father, the late Raja Krishna Datta Singh in 1862 and took charge of the estate of Bhinga in 1869. He was educated at the Court of Wards Institute, Lucknow.

== Philanthropic activity ==
He founded Hewett Kshatriya High School in Varanasi in 1909 which has grown into Udai Pratap Autonomous College. He also founded Udai Pratap Public School at Varanasi. He also established an orphans' home - Bhinga Raj Anathalaya at Kamachchha in Varanasi and also created a permanent fund by donating it Rs. 1,23,000/- to meet the recurring expenses. He donated thousands and lacs of rupees to several social organizations, to name a few- King George Medical College, Lucknow; Moolghandh Kuti Vihar, Sarnath; Calvin Taluqedar College, Lucknow; Hindi Pracharini Sabha, etc. He also created several permanent funds for providing scholarships to students from the interest earned.

He was also founder of the "Kshatriya Upkarni Mahasabha" for which he has made an endowment of Rs. 35,000; and was instrumental in founding of Akhil Bharatiya Kshatriya Mahasabha. He along with Thakur Umarao Singhji of Kotla, Raja Balwant Singh of Awagarh was instrumental in founding of Akhil Bharatiya Kshatriya Mahasabha in year 1897 He was advisor to Education Commission. He was made member of Union Public Service Commission in the year 1886. In acknowledgement and recognition to his education, he was chosen fellow of Allahabad and Calcutta Universities.

In later years of his life, he stayed in Varanasi, where he met Swami Vivekananda. Charmed by his Advaita Vedantik knowledge, the Raja of Bhinga gave him Rs 500 for preaching Vedanta. Swamiji handed the money over to one of his brother disciple, Swami Shivananda, asking him to start an Ashrama with the money at Varanasi. Swami Shivananda started Ramakrishna Advaita Ashrama, Varanasi in 1902.

== Writings ==
He is the author of books - A history of the Bhinga Raj Family (1883); Democracy not suited to India (1888), The decay of the landed Aristocracy in India (1892); Memorandum on the education of the sons of Landlords (1882); Minute on the Law of Sedition in India (1892); The Russul Question (1893) and Views and Observations (1907).
