= Kaitha, Firozabad =

Village in Uttar Pradesh, India

Kaitha
- Village
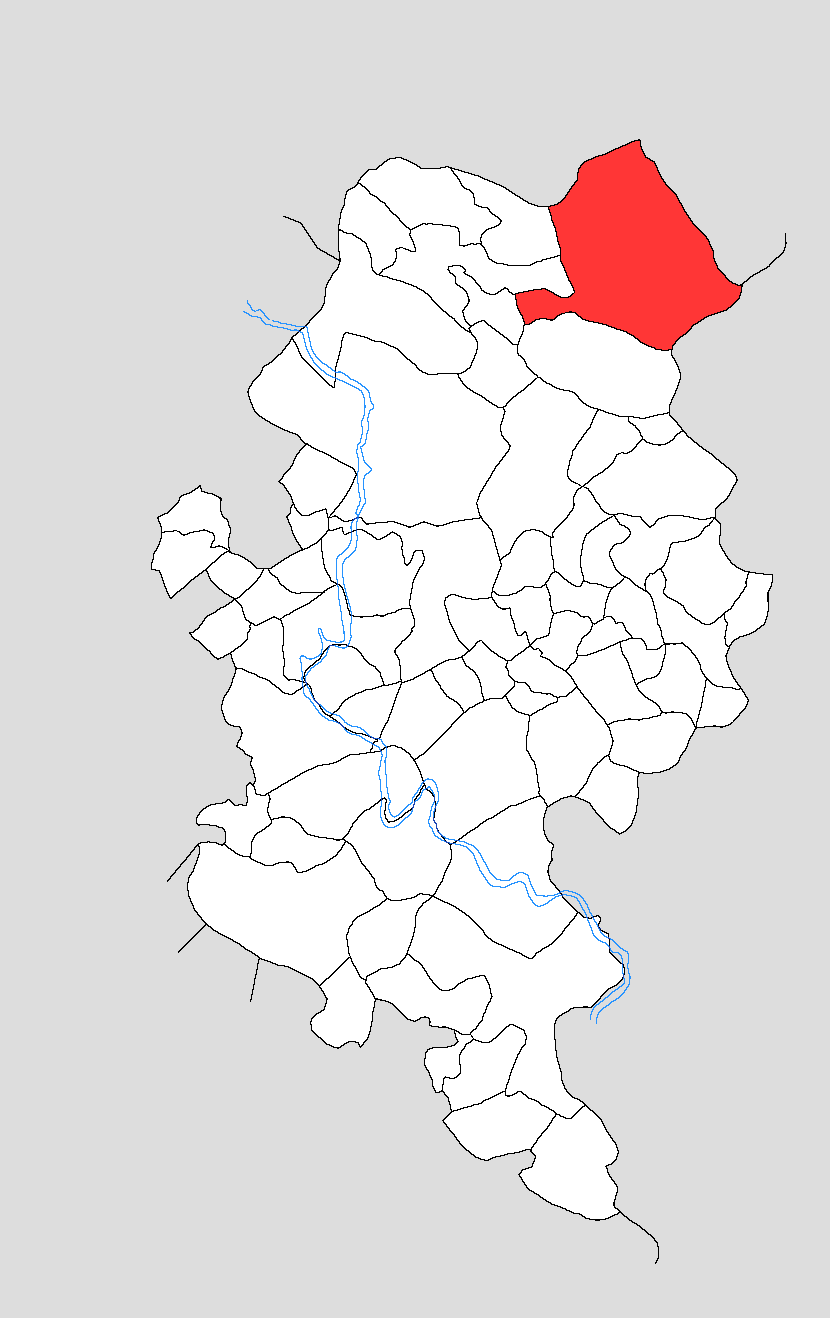
- Map showing Kaitha in Kotla block

- Location in Uttar Pradesh, India
- Coordinates: 27.35646°N 78.45778°E
- Country: India
- State: Uttar Pradesh
- District: Firozabad
- Tehsil: Firozabad

Area
  - Total: 11.865 km^{2} (4.581 sq mi)

Population (2011)
  - Total: 7,813
  - Density: 658.5/km^{2} (1,705/sq mi)
- Time zone: UTC+5:30 (IST)
- PIN: 207301

Kaitha (Kāythā) is a large village in Kotla block of Firozabad district, Uttar Pradesh, India. It is located in the northern part of the district, on the border with Etah district. As of 2011, it had a population of 7,813, in 1,348 households.

== Geography ==
Kaitha is located at the northern end of the Firozabad tehsil, on the border with Etah district. It is located about 10 km northeast of Narki, 26 km from Firozabad, and 55 km from the city of Agra. The village lands cover a large area and are irrigated by the Pilkhatra distributary canal which crosses through them.

== History ==
At the turn of the 20th century, Kaitha was described as a large and prosperous agricultural village, which was then part of the zamindari estate of the Raja of Awagarh. It then had a lower primary school, an indigo factory owned by the Raja of Awagarh, and a canal bungalow on the Pilkhatra distributary. It also then held a small fair for the Phul dol festival. As of 1901, its population was 3,118; this included 2,484 Hindus, 171 Muslims, and 63 others.

== Demographics ==
As of 2011, Kaitha had a population of 7,813, in 1,348 households. This population was 54.1% male (4,226) and 45.9% female (3,587). The 0-6 age group numbered 1,402 (747 male and 655 female), making up 17.9% of the total population. 1,861 residents were members of Scheduled Castes, or 23.8% of the total.

The 1981 census recorded Kaitha as having a population of 4,393 people (2,406 male and 1,987 female), in 730 households and 715 physical houses.

The 1961 census recorded Kaitha as comprising 9 hamlets, with a total population of 3,024 people (1,658 male and 1,366 female), in 588 households and 417 physical houses. The area of the village was given as 3,022 acres and it had a medical practitioner at that point.

== Infrastructure ==
As of 2011, Kaitha had 3 primary schools; it did not have any healthcare facilities. Drinking water was provided by tap, hand pump, and tube well/borehole; there were no public toilets. The village had a sub post office and public library, as well as at least some access to electricity for residential and agricultural (but not commercial) purposes. Streets were made of both kachcha and pakka materials.
