= Persaura =

Parsoura
- village
- Location in Uttar Pradesh, India Parsoura (India)
- Coordinates: 27°37′N 81°55′E
- Country: India
- State: Uttar Pradesh
- District: Shrawasti

Government
  - Body: Gram panchayat

Languages
  - Official: Hindi
- Time zone: UTC+5:30 (IST)
- Postal code: 271831

Parsoura is a village in Bhinga City, under the Shrawasti district of the state of Uttar Pradesh, India. It is known for its celebrations of Muharram and Jashn-e-eidmiladunnabi.

== Geography ==
Persaura is located at 27°37′43″N 81°55′30″E. It is 3 km (1.9 mi) from the West Rapti River.
