= Nauner =

Village in Uttar Pradesh, India

- Village
- Location in Uttar Pradesh, India
- Coordinates: 27.23917°N 78.91154°E
- Country: India
- State: Uttar Pradesh
- District: Mainpuri
- Tehsil: Mainpuri

Area
  - Total: 40.942 km^{2} (15.808 sq mi)

Population (2011)
  - Total: 15,516
  - Density: 378.98/km^{2} (981.54/sq mi)
- Time zone: UTC+5:30 (IST)

Nauner (Nauner) is a village in Mainpuri block of Mainpuri district, Uttar Pradesh. A large village with many constituent hamlets, Nauner is located west of Mainpuri and a bit off the highway to Agra. An old fort in the village is popularly attributed to a governor under the Nawabs of Awadh. As of 2011, Nauner has a population of 15,516, in 2,701 households.

== Geography ==
Nauner is located about 13 km west of Mainpuri, a short distance from the Agra highway. The main village site is located on a high mound, or khera.

== History ==
According to tradition, an Ahir named Bhola was the zamindar of Nauner sometime around the year 1700. Many wells and tanks on the village lands are popularly attributed to him. The local garhi, or fort, is popularly attributed to Almas Ali Khan, who served as a governor under the Nawabs of Awadh.

At the turn of the 20th century, Nauner was described as a large agricultural village that included 42 hamlets. With a population of 6,020 as of the 1901 census, it was one of the most populous settlements in the entire district at that point. It had one school for boys and another for girls. The village was jointly held by the Raja of Awa (in Etah district) and the Thakur of Kotla.

== Demographics ==
As of 2011, Nauner had a population of 15,516, in 2,701 households. This population was 53.1% male (8,234) and 46.9% female (7,282). The 0-6 age group numbered 2,129 (1,135 male and 994 female), or 13.7% of the total population. 3,766 residents were members of Scheduled Castes, or 24.3% of the total.

The 1981 census recorded Nauner as having a population of 10,589 people, in 1,703 households.

The 1961 census recorded Nauner as comprising 35 hamlets, with a total population of 7,900 people (4,087 male and 3,813 female), in 1,705 households and 1,201 physical houses. The area of the village was given as 10,117 acres and it had a post office at that point.

== Infrastructure ==
As of 2011, Nauner had 6 primary schools and 1 veterinary hospital but no healthcare facilities for humans. Drinking water was provided by tap, well, hand pump, and tube well; there was at least one public toilet. The village had a post office and public library, as well as at least some access to electricity for residential and commercial purposes. Streets were made of both kachcha and pakka materials.
