= Rampal Singh =

Rampal Singh may refer to:

- Ram Pal Singh (1922–?), Indian politician from Uttar Pradesh
- Rampal Singh (INC politician), Indian politician in the Madhya Pradesh Legislative Assembly
- Rampal Singh (Madhya Pradesh politician) (born 1956), Indian politician, belonging to Bhartiya Janata Party
- Rampal Singh (Uttar Pradesh politician) (1930–2020), Indian politician, belonging to Bhartiya Janata Party
- Raja Rampal Singh (1849–1909), ruler of Kalakankar estate of Oudh in British India

== See also ==
- Rampal (disambiguation)
- List of people with surname Singh
