= Shravasti district =

Coordinates: 27.701958°N 81.934845°E

- District of Uttar Pradesh
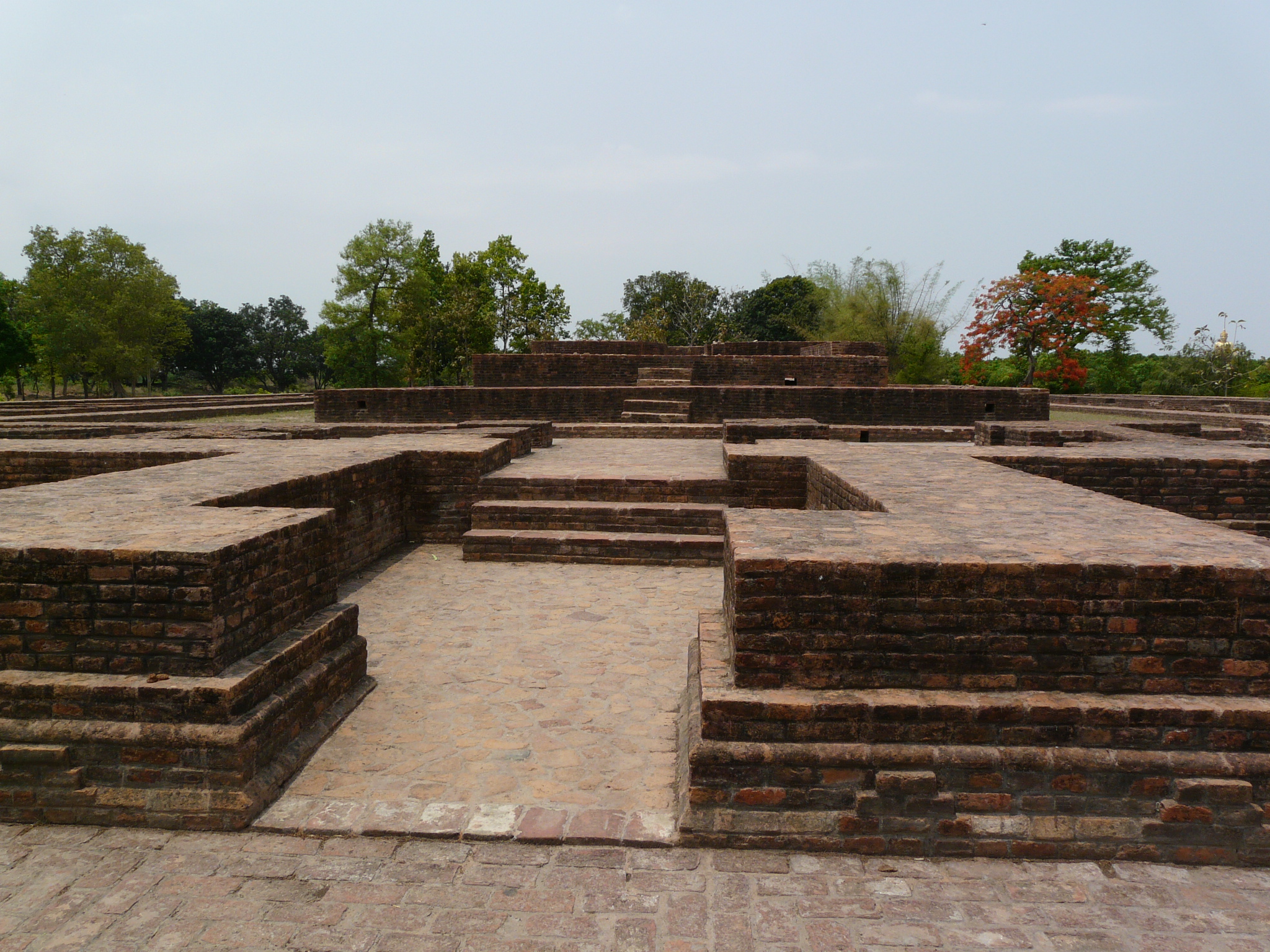
- Jetavana Monastery in Shravasti

- Location of Shravasti district in Uttar Pradesh
- Country: India
- State: Uttar Pradesh
- Division: Devipatan
- Headquarters: Bhinga
- Tehsils: Ikauna, Bhinga, Jamunaha

Government
  - Lok Sabha constituencies: Shravasti
  - Vidhan Sabha constituencies: Shravasti and Bhinga

Area
  - Total: 1,640 km^{2} (630 sq mi)

Population (2011)
  - Total: 1,117,361
  - Density: 681/km^{2} (1,760/sq mi)
  - Urban: 38,649

Demographics
  - Literacy: 46.74 per cent
  - Sex ratio: 881
- Time zone: UTC+05:30 (IST)
- Major highways: SH-26, SH-96A
- Website: shravasti.nic.in

Shravasti district is one of the districts of the Uttar Pradesh state of India, with Bhinga town as its district headquarters. Shravasti district is a part of Devipatan Division. According to Government of India, it is among the 121 minority concentrated districts in India. It is the fourth most backward district in India, according to the 2018 Niti Aayog ranking. It is the most poverty-stricken district in the country.

== History ==
Shravasti, the north-eastern town of Uttar Pradesh, is located near the West Rapti River. This town is closely associated with the life of Gautama Buddha, who is believed to have spent 24 Chaturmases here. Age-old stupas, majestic viharas and several temples near the village of "Sahet-Mahet" establish Buddha's association with Shravasti. According to Nagarjuna, the city had a population of 900,000 in 5th century BCE and it even overshadowed Magadha's capital, Rajgir.

As mentioned in the 'Bruhatkalpa' and various Kalpas of the fourteenth century, the name of the city was Mahid. There are subsequent mentions showing that the name of this city was Sahet-Mahet. It is also mentioned that a vast fort covered this city in which there were many temples having idols of Devkulikas.

Today a great rampart of earth and brick surrounds this city. During excavation in 'Sahet-Mahet' near Shravasti City, many ancient idols and inscriptions were found. They are now kept in museums of Mathura and Lucknow. At present, the archaeological department of the Indian Government is doing excavation to perform allied research.

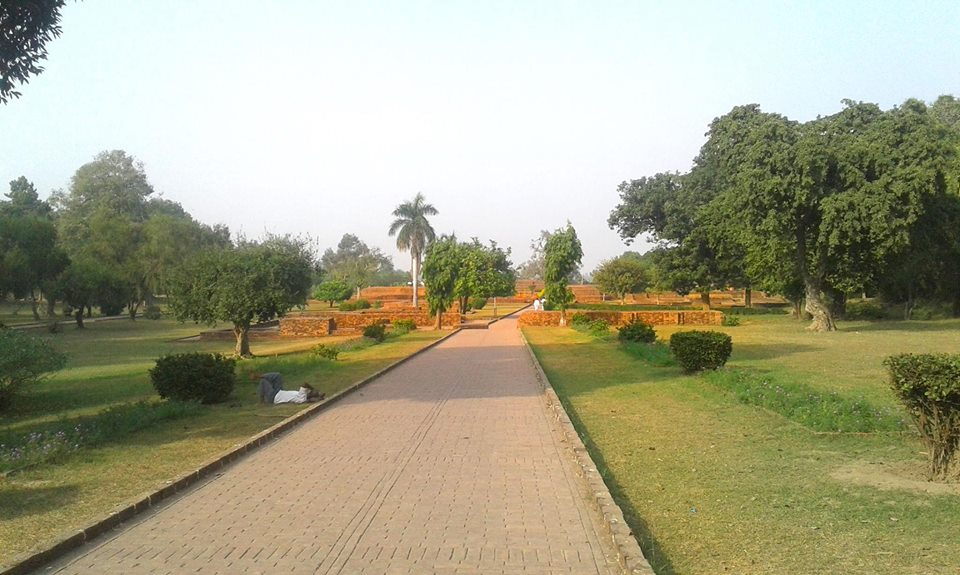
Buddha Park

Shravasti was formed in May 1997 when Bahraich district was divided.

=== Jaina sources ===
Shravasti is often mentioned in Jaina sources. It is also called Chandrapuri or Chandrikapuri or Ārya Kṣetra, because Jaina texts state that two of their Tirthankaras were born here millions of years ago, in prehistoric times – Sambhavanatha (3rd of 24) and Chandraprabha (8th of 24). Shravasti is also known as the capital city of Kunala's kingdom.

Sambhavanatha is said to have had taken initiation, donated all his belongings, and broken his first fast in Shravasti after begging for alms from King Surendradatta. Munisuvrataswami, the 20th Tirthankara, visited Shravasti and initiated several members of the royal family. As per the Jaina text Jnatadharmakathah, Parshvanatha, the 23rd Tirthankara, also visited Shravasti and inspired several lay-followers to accept initiation.

Further, Shravasti is the place of the bitter arguments and meeting between Mahavira – the 24th Tirthankara, and Gosala Mankhaliputta – the founder of Ajivikas and a rival. According to the Jain texts, the Mahavira visited Shravasti many times and spent his tenth varsha monsoon season here before attaining omniscience. He was hosted by a wealthy merchant named Nandinipriya. Ancient Jain scholars such as Kapila, Maghavan and Keshi studied in Shravasti. At Shravasti, Jamāli, Mahavira's son-in-law, created the first of the eight heretical sects by opposing tenets of Jainism as taught by Mahavira himself. The eighth heretical sect, Digambara sect, was created by Sivabhuti at Rathavirapur. As described in the Jaina text Uttaradhyayana Sutra, the discussion between Keśiśramanācharya and Mahavira's first disciple, Gautama Swami, is said to have had taken place at Shravasti. This was the place where Upkeśa Gaccha was established by Keśiśramanācharya after he accepted Mahavira's conduct and became a white-clad monk along with all his disciples who were initially following Parshvanatha's conduct. Moreover, the Pattavali described in the Kalpa Sūtra, states the existence of "Śrāvastikā Śākhā", one of the four branches of the "Veṣavāṭikgaṇa" of the Jaina sangha. It had originated from Ācārya Kāmardhi, a disciple of Ācārya Suhastisuri, belonging to the beginning of the 3rd century BCE. Ācārya Jinaprabhasuri, in his Vividha Tirtha Kalpa confirms that a Jaina temple with an image of Sambhavanatha was renovated multiple times until it was finally completely desecrated during the reign of Alauddin Khilji.

== Geography ==
Shravasti—part of historic Awadh—was carved out from Gonda district on the south and Bahraich district on the west. Shrawasti also borders Balrampur on the east, and Banke and Dang districts of Nepal to the north. Shravasti district headquarters Bhinga is about 170 kilometres from Lucknow, the state capital.

== Economy ==
In 2006 the Ministry of Panchayati Raj named Shravasti one of the country's 250 most backward districts (out of a total of 640). It is one of the 34 districts in Uttar Pradesh currently receiving funds from the Backward Regions Grant Fund Programme (BRGF).

== Demographics ==
Historical population
Year	Pop.	±% p.a.
1901	285,233	—
1911	284,164	−0.04%
1921	288,905	+0.17%
1931	308,159	+0.65%
1941	336,423	+0.88%
1951	365,107	+0.82%
1961	401,234	+0.95%
1971	444,754	+1.04%
1981	543,835	+2.03%
1991	672,898	+2.15%
2001	855,985	+2.44%
2011	1,117,361	+2.70%

According to the 2011 census Shravasti district has a population of 1,117,361, roughly equal to the nation of Cyprus or the US state of Rhode Island. This gives it a ranking of 414th in India (out of a total of 640). The district has a population density of 681 inhabitants per square kilometre (1,760/sq mi). Its population growth rate over the decade 2001–2011 was 30.54%. Shrawasti has a sex ratio of 881 females for every 1000 males, and a literacy rate of 46.74%. Male literacy rate is 57.16% while that of female is 34.78%. 3.46% of the population lives in urban areas. Approximately 0.11% (1,253 people) of the total population of the district lives on footpath or without any roof cover. Scheduled Castes and Scheduled Tribes made up 16.94% and 0.50% of the population respectively.

=== Religion ===
Religions in Shravasti district (2011)
Religion	Percent
Hinduism	68.79%
Islam	30.79%
Other or not stated	0.42%

Shravasti district is Hindu-majority, but has a large minority of Muslims. The district headquarters, Bhinga, is Muslim-majority. Although formerly a centre of Buddhism, only 323 Buddhists live in the district at the present-time.

=== Language ===
Languages of Shravasti district (2011)
1. Hindi (87.5%)
2. Awadhi (11.2%)
3. Urdu (1.15%)
4. Others (0.13%)

At the time of the 2011 Census of India, 87.55% of the population in the district spoke Hindi, 11.17% Awadhi and 1.15% Urdu as their first language. The local dialect is Awadhi.

== Villages ==
- Persaura

== Sources ==
- Law, B.C. (1935). Sravasti in Indian Literature. Memoirs of the Archaeological Survey of India: Number 50, ASI.
