= Dinesh Singh (politician, born 1925) =

Indian politician

Raja Dinesh Singh
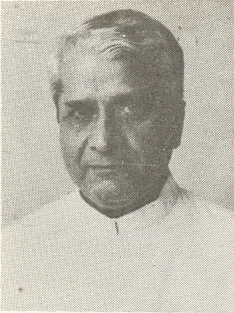

Union Minister of External Affairs
- In office 1969–1970
- Prime Minister: Indira Gandhi
- Preceded by: Indira Gandhi (Acting)
- Succeeded by: Sardar Swaran Singh
- In office 1993–1995
- Prime Minister: P. V. Narasimha Rao
- Preceded by: P. V. Narasimha Rao (Acting)
- Succeeded by: Pranab Mukherjee

Union Ministry of Water Resources
- In office 14 February 1988 – 25 June 1988
- Prime Minister: Rajiv Gandhi
- Preceded by: Ram Niwas Mirdha
- Succeeded by: B. Shankaranand

Member of Parliament, Lok Sabha
- In office 1967–1977
- Preceded by: Ajit Pratap Singh
- Succeeded by: Roop Nath Singh Yadav
- Constituency: Pratapgarh
- In office 1984–1991
- Preceded by: Ajit Pratap Singh
- Succeeded by: Abhay Pratap Singh
- Constituency: Pratapgarh
- Pretender information
- Title(s): Raja of Kalakankar
- Throne(s) claimed: Kalakankar
- Pretend from: 1971–1995
- Monarchy abolished: Sovereign Monarchy; 1947 (Instrument of Accession); Titular Monarchy; 1971 (26th Amendment of the Indian Constitution)
- Last monarch: Himself
- Successor: Vacant

Raja of Kalakankar
- Reign: 1933–1947
- Predecessor: Raja Awadhesh Singh
- Titular Reign: 1947–1971
- Born: 19 July 1925; Kalakankar, United Provinces, British India
- Died: 30 November 1995 (aged 70); Delhi, India
- Spouse: Neelima Kumari
- Father: Raja Awadhesh Singh
- Education: University of Lucknow; The Doon School
- Political party: Indian National Congress
- Children: 6 (including Rajkumari Ratna Singh)

Raja Dinesh Singh (19 July 1925 – 30 November 1995) was an Indian politician. His family is from Kalakankar. He served as a Member of Parliament on several occasions, and twice served as the Minister of External Affairs of India.

== Early life and education ==
Dinesh Singh was born on 19 July 1925, to Raja Awadhesh Singh, the taluqdar, or landed nobleman, of Kalakankar in Uttar Pradesh. He was educated at The Doon School, Dehradun and at Lucknow University.

== Political career ==
In 1962-66 he was Deputy Minister in the Ministry of External Affairs 1962–66, Minister of State 1966–67, and Minister of Commerce 1967-69 and 1988–89, Minister of Industrial Development and Internal Trade 1970–71. He was Minister of External Affairs 1969-70 and 1993–1995.

He was elected from Pratapgarh for seven terms from the Second Lok Sabha (1957–62), to the Fifth Lok Sabha (1971–77), and then again for the Eighth and Ninth Lok Sabha 1984–1991, serving in the Rajya Sabha in the interregnum.

== Personal life ==
He married Neelima Kumari of the Tehri-Garhwal ruling family, in 1944, and had six daughters. His sixth daughter is Ratna Singh, who was also a member of Lok Sabha from the same Pratapgarh constituency.

He died on 30 November 1995 in New Delhi, due to various diseases. At the time of his death, he was a minister without portfolio in the Cabinet headed by P. V. Narasimha Rao.

== See also ==
- Brajesh Singh, uncle of Dinesh Singh.

Preceded by Indira Gandhi	Minister for External Affairs of India; 1969–1970	Succeeded by Sardar Swaran Singh
Preceded by P V Narasimha Rao	Minister for External Affairs of India; 1993–1995	Succeeded by Pranab Mukherjee
