= Kunwar Suresh Singh =

Kunwar Suresh Singh was an Indian author and independence activist. Singh wrote the book titled Pant Ji Aur Kalakankar and Yadon Ke Jharokhe. He was also active in the Indian independence movement and was closely associated with Mahatma Gandhi.

== Early life ==
He hailed from the Bisen Rajput family of Kalakankar, zamindari of Oudh.

He was elder brother of King Awadhesh Pratap Singh of Kalakankar.

Suresh was married to Prakashvati; she died on 28 May 1987.

== Career ==
Suresh Singh and his brother Raja Awadhesh Singh first met Mahatma Gandhi in Sabarmati Ashram and later at Kalakankar Bhavan in Lucknow. On 14 November 1929, Gandhi visited Kalakankar (now in district Pratapgarh). Kunwar Suresh Singh became a close associate. Bapu wrote many letters to him for guidance.

He wrote about Hindi literature and art . He was associated with poet Sumitranandan Pant, lyricist Naeem, and actor Mani Madhukar.

== See also ==
- Pratapgarh Estate
