= Nahar Singh of Shahpura =

HH Raja Sir Nahar Singh
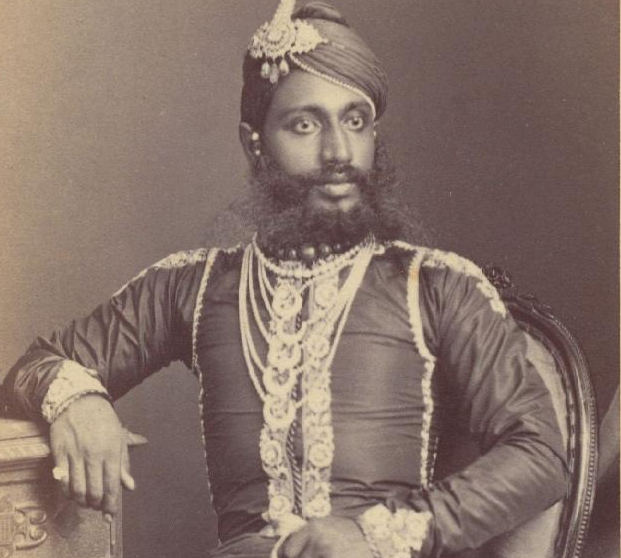
- Rajadhiraj Nahar Singh (1900)
- Reign: 1870–1932
- Predecessor: Raja Lakshman Singh
- Successor: Raja Sir Umaid Singh II
- Born: 7 November 1855; Dhanope,Shahpura State, Rajputana
- Died: 24 June 1932 (aged 76); Shahpura, Shahpura State, Rajputana
- Spouse: Maharaniji Sa Rathorji of Baghera in Ajmer; Mahahraniji Sa Chauhanji (Khichanji) of Madhusudangarh in Central Provinces of India; Maharaniji Sa Jhaliji Shri Swarup Kanwarji Saheba of Sokhada in Dhrangadhra State; Maharaniji Sa Chauhanji (Khichanji) Vakhat Kanwarji of Chhota Udaipur State
- Issue: Raja Umaid Singh II; Maharajkumarji Sardar Singh; Maharajkumariji Baiji Lal Shri Gulab Kanwarji m.to HH Maharana Raj Amarsinhji Banesinhji of Wankaner State; Maharajkumariji Baiji Lal Shri Phool Kanwarji m.to HH Maharana Jorawar Sinhji Pratap Sinhji of Santrampur State; Maharajkumariji Baiji Lal (name unknown) (died young); Maharajkumariji Baiji Lal Shri Lakshmi Kanwarji m.to HH Maharana Raj Jorawar Sinhji Jaswant Sinhji of Wadhwan State }}
- House: Sisodia
- Father: Raj Thakuran Dhirat Singh
- Mother: Rathorji d.of Thakur Megh Singh of Kotri in Kishangarh State

HH Swasti Shri Rajadhiraj Sir Nahar Singh Bahadur KCIE (7 November 1855 – 24 June 1932) was the Sisodia Rajput ruler of the erstwhile Shahpura State in central Rajputana (now Rajasthan) from the year 1870 to 1932. He succeeded Raja Lakshman Singh his distant cousin and a childless predecessor.

He attended the Coronation of the King-Emperor Edward VII and Queen-Empress Alexandra at Westminster Abbey in London in 1902. He was granted a permanent salute of 9-guns in the year 1925.

He mortgaged the family jewels and private property to construct two massive irrigation tanks named Nahar Sagar and Umaid Sagar to assist his drought-ridden subjects. He established a system of local government, with a large measure of representation, modeled on the London County Council. An energetic and modern ruler, he built schools, hospitals and roads, which transformed his little state out of all recognition.

He was the Chairman of Paropkarini Sabha 1893–1932, Member of Mahand Raj Sabha He served as President of the All India Kshatriya Mahasabha - 1922. In 1922 under his chairmanship, the organization decided to bring four lakh-converted Muslim Rajputs back into the Hindu fold by way of a purification ritual. The historic meeting where the decision was taken was held at Agra on 31 December 1922, under president ship of Raja Nahar Singh. Later on, Nahar Singh invited Sir Madan Mohan Malviya under whose guidance thousands of Muslim Rajput families were brought back in to the Hindu fold after purification. Inspired by this pioneering effort of the Kshatriya Mahasabha, Akhil Bharatiya Hindu Mahasabha (which was founded by Madan Mohan Malviya) also passed similar resolution a few months later to bring back converted Muslims into the Hindu fold by purification rites.

He received the imperial Prince of Wales's Medal (1876), Kaiser-i-Hind Medal (1877), Coronation Medal (1902), and the Delhi Durbar Medals of 1903 and 1911. He was created a Knight Commander of the Order of the Indian Empire(KCIE) in the 1903 Durbar Honours.

Raja Nahar Singh was one of the devotees and wellwisher of Swami Dayanand Saraswati and he welcomed him with open heart when visit Shahpura on 9th March 1883. While Swamiji was in Shahpura, he received invitation to come to Jodhpur State but Raja Nahar Singh had warned him against going to Jodhpur.

He is listed amongst one of the longest ruling monarchs of the 20th century.
