= Hanumant Singh of Kalakankar =

Raja Hanumant Singh (1826-1885) was the Talukdar of Kalakankar. He was awarded the title of Raja by the King of Awadh, Wajid Ali Shah in 1849. Raja Hanumant Singh belonged to Bisen Rajput clan and were the Talukdars of Kalakankar of which Rampur was the capital for the state known as Rampur–Dharupur. This branch of the family had descended from Roop Mull, younger brother to a ruler of Majhauli in today’s Gorakhpur District. The branch moved to Manikpur near Allahabad till it was finally established in what came to be called Kalakankar by Raja Hanumant Singh.

Raja Hanumant Singh was onr of the leaders in the Revolution of 1857 along with his son Lal Pratap Singh. At the behest of the Begum Hazrat Mahal of Awadh, Raja Hanumant Singh raised a battalion of 1000 soldiers under the command of his eldest son, Lal Pratap Singh. This battalion, called ‘Pratap Jang’, rose to action in February 1858 when the English under Colin Campbell attempted to recapture Lucknow. Colin Campbell was aided by a Gurkha battalion and two Company Battalions. The three forces summoned by the Begum, including the one from Kalakankar, camped at Chande in Sultanpur district.Raja Hanumant Singh's younger brother Madhav Singh and his son Lal Pratap Singh were martyred here fighting with British East India Company's forces in Revolt of 1857.

After the Revolt of 1857, many Taluqdars and Rajput Estate Holders who supported the revolutionists or participated in the revolt, faced punishment by the British. Their properties and assets were either seized or reduced and their social status was compromised. The British impounded many of their lands and properties and they were taxed with heavy fines. Raja Hanumant Singh, was dispossessed of his many properties by British for supporting and taking active role the Revolt of 1857. Raja Hanumant Singh believed a pan-India organization was necessary to correct the injustice faced by their community. So, he founded an association of jagirdars and taluqdars belonging to Kshatriya and Rajput communities in year 1857 with other Taluqdars of Oudh and named it the Ram Dal. after Shri Ram. It was renamed Kshatriya Hitkarni Sabha in 1860. The association was formed to protect and fight for rights and interests of Rajput communities. In 1897, Kshatriya Mahasabha became the successor to the Kshatriya Hitkarni Sabha, Akhil Bharatiya Kshatriya Mahasabha came into existence on 19 Oct 1897, creating a platform to promote the cause of the Kshatriyas and Rajputs. Thus Raja Hanumant Singh is considered as original founder of the institution.

He died in 1885 succeeded by his grandson, Raja Rampal Singh (son of Lal Pratap Singh ), who became Taluqdar of Kalakankar
