= Mangala Rai =

Indian sculptor (born 1947)

- Born: 1947 (age 78–79); Ghazipur, India
- Occupation: Agricultural Scientist

Mangala Rai (born June 30, 1947) is an Indian agriculture scientist. He served as Secretary of the Department of Agricultural Research and Education (DARE) and Director General of the Indian Council of Agricultural Research (ICAR).

== Early life ==
He was born into a farming family in Ghazipur, Uttar Pradesh. Rai earned his B.Sc. (Ag.) from Gorakhpur University in 1967, followed by an M.Sc.(ag.) in 1969 and a Ph.D. in 1973 from Banaras Hindu University, Varanasi.

== Career ==
Rai began working as a Junior Plant Breeder at R.B.S. College, Agra (1973–1975). He held positions in multiple organizations, eventually rising to the top of India's agro-research and dissemination network. He has visited more than 50 countries while leading several national delegations. He has published nearly 200 research papers in national and international journals.

In 2022, he chaired a committee focused on the holistic development of agriculture and allied sectors in the Union Territory of Jammu and Kashmir.

== Recognition ==
Rai has been awarded honorary Doctor of Science degrees by 16 universities. He is a fellow of several professional bodies.

- U.S. Awasthi IFFCO Lifetime Achievement Award for 2023–24.
