= Mallick Bari (Midnapore) =

- মল্লিক বাড়ি
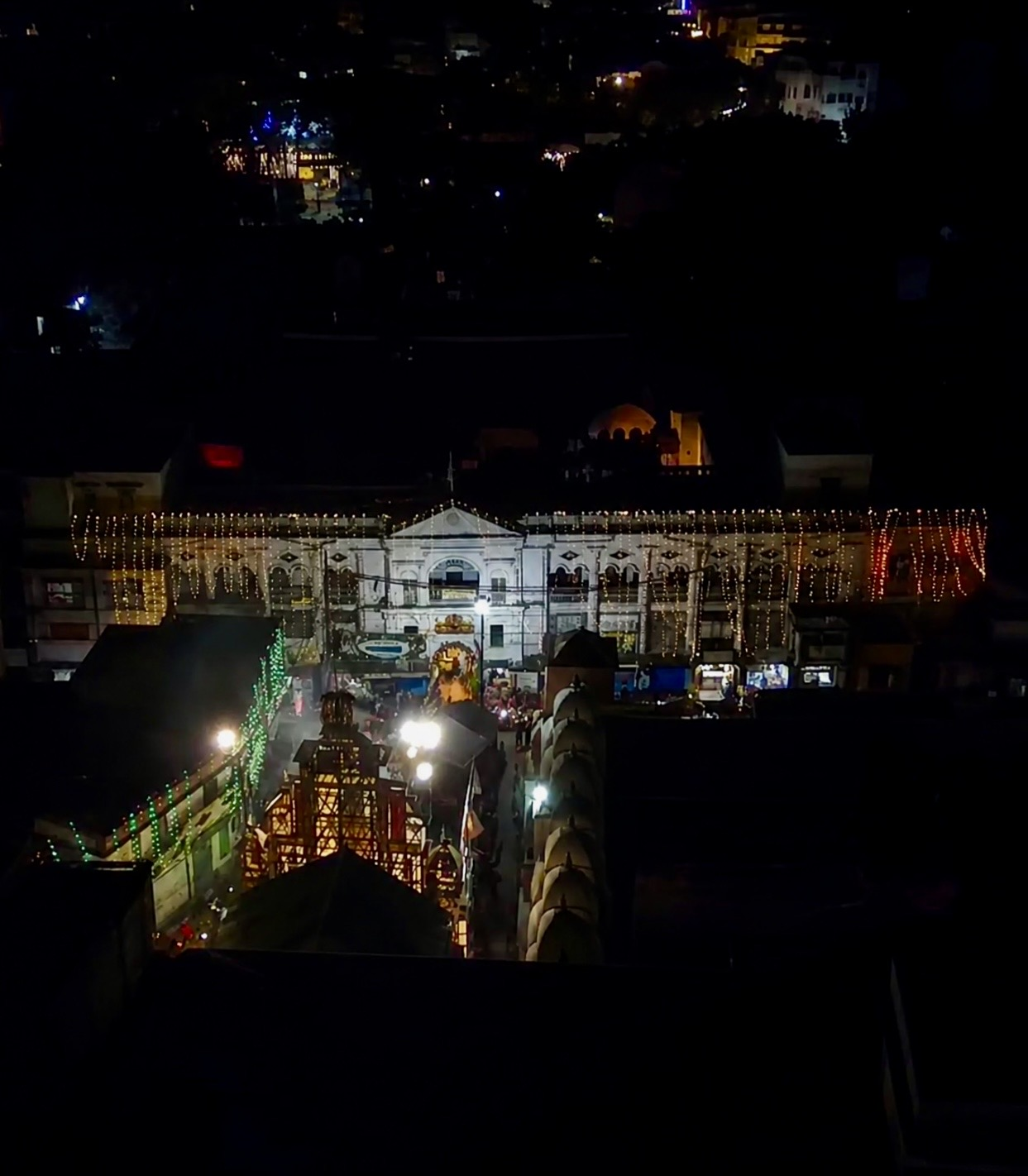
- Mallick Bari

General information
- Architectural style: Neoclassical
- Location: Midnapore, West Bengal

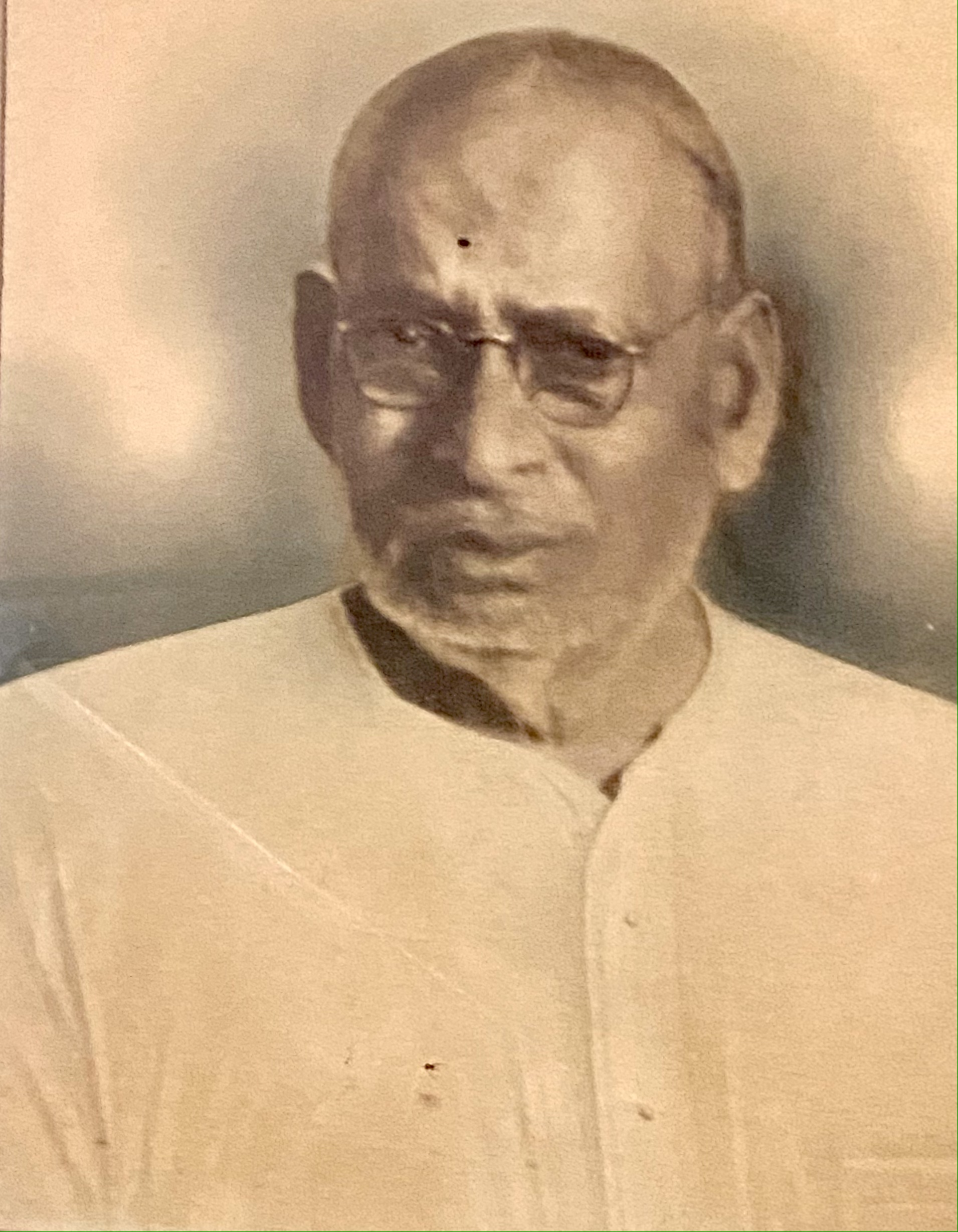
Chowdhuri Satish Chandra Kar Bahadur, the last Estate Zamindar.

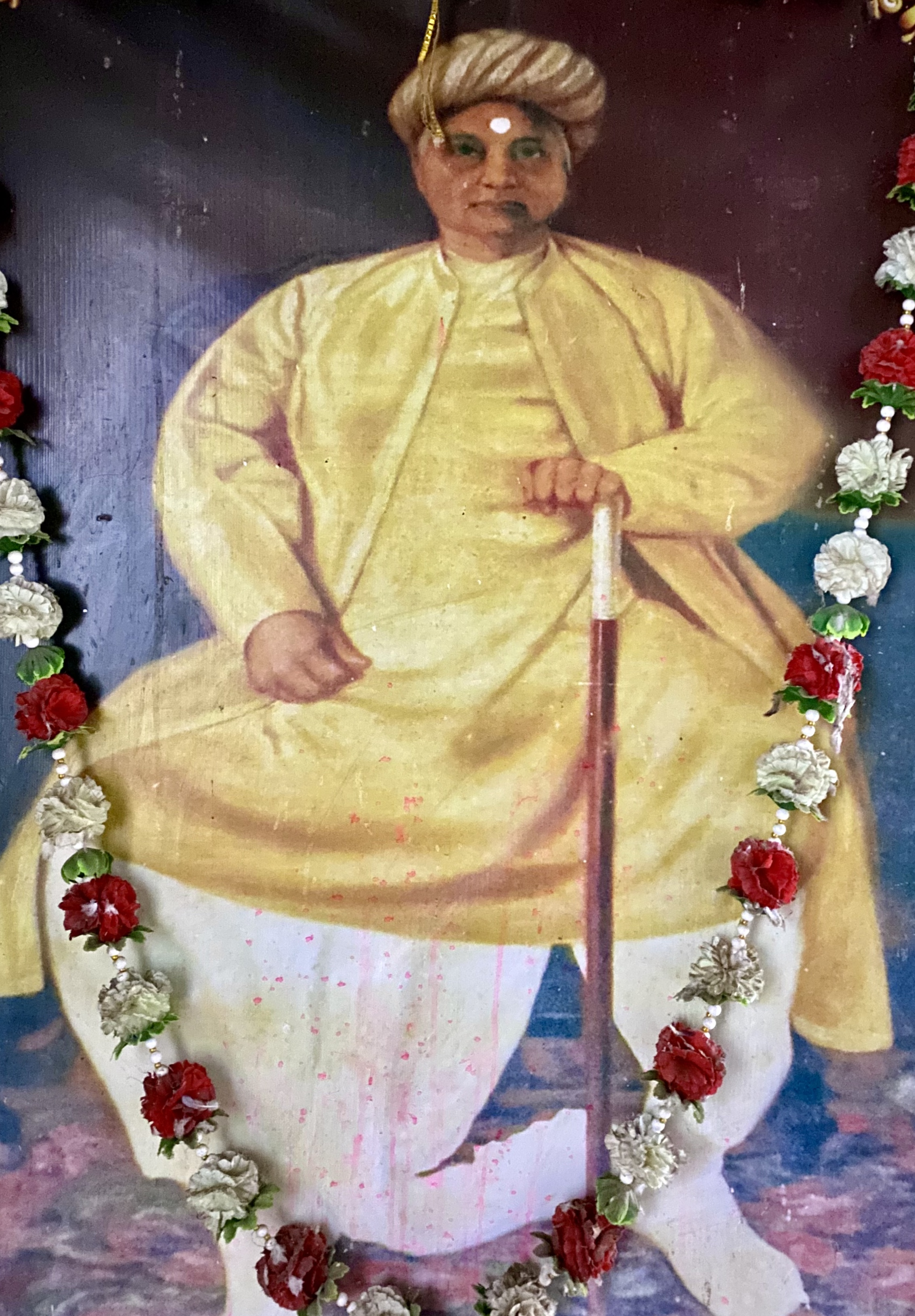
Chowdhuri Janmenjay Mallick Bahadur, one of the most prominent of the Estate Zamindars

The Mallick Bari is an erstwhile Zamindari palace or rajbari located in the district of Paschim Medinipur, West Bengal, India. The rajbari is considered one of Midnapore's most prominent heritage sites today. Constructions commenced under Midnapore's Zamindar Janmenjay Mallick in the early 19th century. In 1922, estate administration was briefly taken over by the Court of Wards. Swapan Dasgupta has suggested that the estate's extent included areas of modern day Kharagpur, Debra, Moyna, Daspur, Midnapur, Narsingarh, Bhagwanpur, Patashpur, Dantan and Binpur, making it one of the largest zamindari estates by area in Southern Bengal. The estate is most notable for its historical association with the revolutionary movement for Indian independence and its impressive architectural details, temples, and prominent bonedi festivities.

== History ==
Mallick Bari was the official residence of the Zamindars of Midnapore, among whom Chowdhury Zamindar Jamini Nath Mallick is the most well-recognised. It is after the titular surname that the location has been named Mallick Chowk. Among the notable aspects is the family's historic Durga Puja, started almost three centuries back during the Maratha invasion of Bengal under the command of Raghuji Bhonsale, later King of Nagpur in today's Maharashtra. Among the traditions are the practices of firing a cannon at the commencement of the Sandhi Puja to notify the other publicly organised pujas and pandals in the vicinity and Kobi-Ganer Lorai, a form of Bengali folk performance that entailed a verbal duel among opponent poets, patronised by former aristocrats in the Bengal region. Apart from the familial Durga Puja, Jamini Mallick also patronised a prominent Chandi Puja that continues in today's East Midnapore region.

In 1877, during the Delhi Durbar celebrations for Queen Victoria, Janmenjay Mallick was presented with a sanad. The estate itself also evolved through the acquisition of other dispossessed local zamindaris like the medieval Mājnāmuṭhā estate and the Karnagarh Raj. In 1851, Janmenjay constructed the famous Jagannath temple in Sujaganj, which conducts the annual local Ratha Yatra. The temple is south-facing and has a shikhar deul rising 70 feet in height. Besides that, Janmenjay also commissioned the construction of twelve temples dedicated to Shiva in the Shibbazar area and a Rashmancha hosting Rashutsab.

== Independence Movement ==
Active in the political sphere, in 1865, Janmenjay Mallick Bahadur, along with other prominent individuals like Babu Rajnarayan Basu, Prasanna Chandra Bandyopadhyay and Maulavi Khairat Ali, founded the Midnapore Municipality, under the aegis of then District Magistrate and Collector. Jamini Nath Mallick, Janmenjay's successor and one of the district's wealthiest individuals, was also reprimanded by the colonial government for his association with revolutionaries and funding several movements. He was convicted, along with Narendralal Khan of the Narajole Raj Estate, in the Midnapore Bomb Conspiracy Case in 1911. In the case that followed, Jamini Mallick was defended by the barrister Byomkesh Chakraborty while the government prosecution was led by the Lord Satyendra Prasanna Sinha, 1st Baron Sinha. In his pamphlet titled 'Why India is in Revolt against British Rule?', written in 1916 in New York, Indian revolutionary and later President of the Indian National Congress at the 1920 Calcutta special session Lala Lajpat Rai alluded to the conviction of Jamini Mallick as part of the Bomb Conspiracy case as an example of the 'British tyranny' even in peacetime.

Over the years, the family built long-standing ties with the Anushilan Samiti and Jugantar Dal. In December, 1907, Khudiram Bose, Barindra Kumar Ghosh, and Satyendranath Basu stayed at the rajbari and Chaudhuri Jamini Mallick played a key role in the unsuccessful wrecking attempt on the Lieutenant Governor Andrew Henderson Leith Fraser's train near Narayangarh, Medinipur.

== Architecture ==
Among the notable architectural standards are the estate rajbari, built in the neoclassical style, and the Durga Dalan, built in the navaratna style. Next to the Durga Dalan is the family deity Shri Radhakanta Jiu's temple, which is similarly built in the navaratna style and has several ornate terracotta friezes, with an intricate silver-clad wooden door to the temple that contains scenes from the Dashavataras. Apart from these, there are twelve temples dedicated to the Hindu God Shiva at Shibbajar, a Rasmancha, site of the Ras Purnima celebrations, and water bodies and canals constructed by Janmenjay Mallick. The Jagannath temple in Sujaganj, the Rudreshwar Shiva temple in Sabang, and the Rupeshwara Shiva temple in Kharagpur, are some of the other examples of temples commissioned by this family in the Odia deula style of Hindu temple architecture.

In 1878, one of the district's first theatrical performances was held at the Natmandir, constructed in the at-chala style, within the rajbari quarters. The rajbari itself also has an impressive andar-mahal. This was for the first time that the foot-light technique had come to be used in dramatics. Among the most prominent personalities who advocated for and regularly patronised dramatics were Chowdhuri Kumar Joggeshwar Mallick and Chowdhuri Kumar Jogendranath Mallick, brothers of Chowdhuri Jamini Mallick Bahadur. Two of the first dramatic performances - ‘Ramabhishek’ and ‘Pravabati’, were organised by their theatrical association, which also included several Magistrates and zamindari rajas, and was patronised by Sir Nilratan Sircar.

== Gallery ==
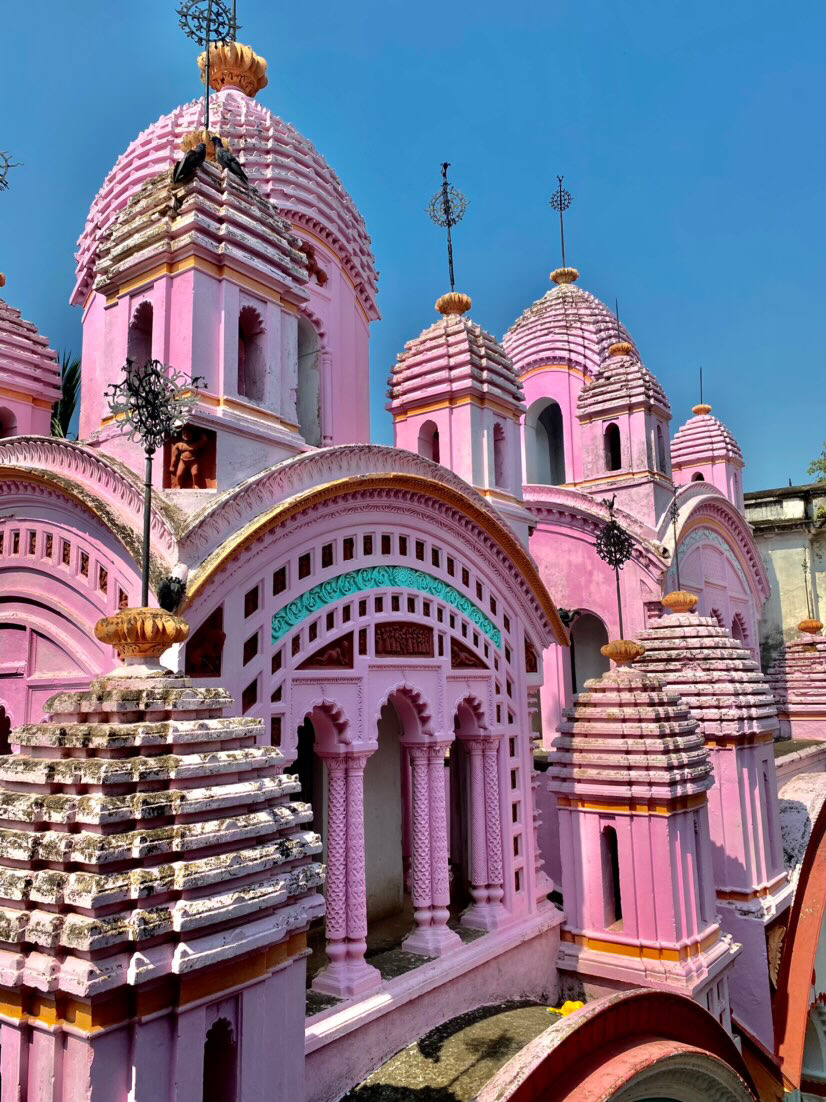
Radhakanta Temple and Durga Dalan

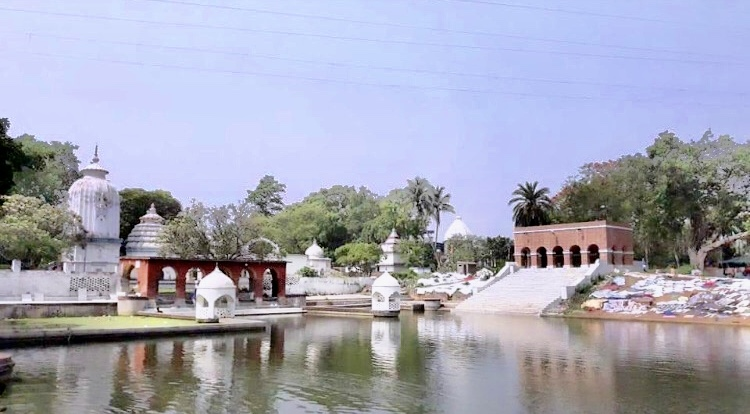
Rupeshwara Temple in Kharagpur, family temple of the Mallicks, built in the Deul style

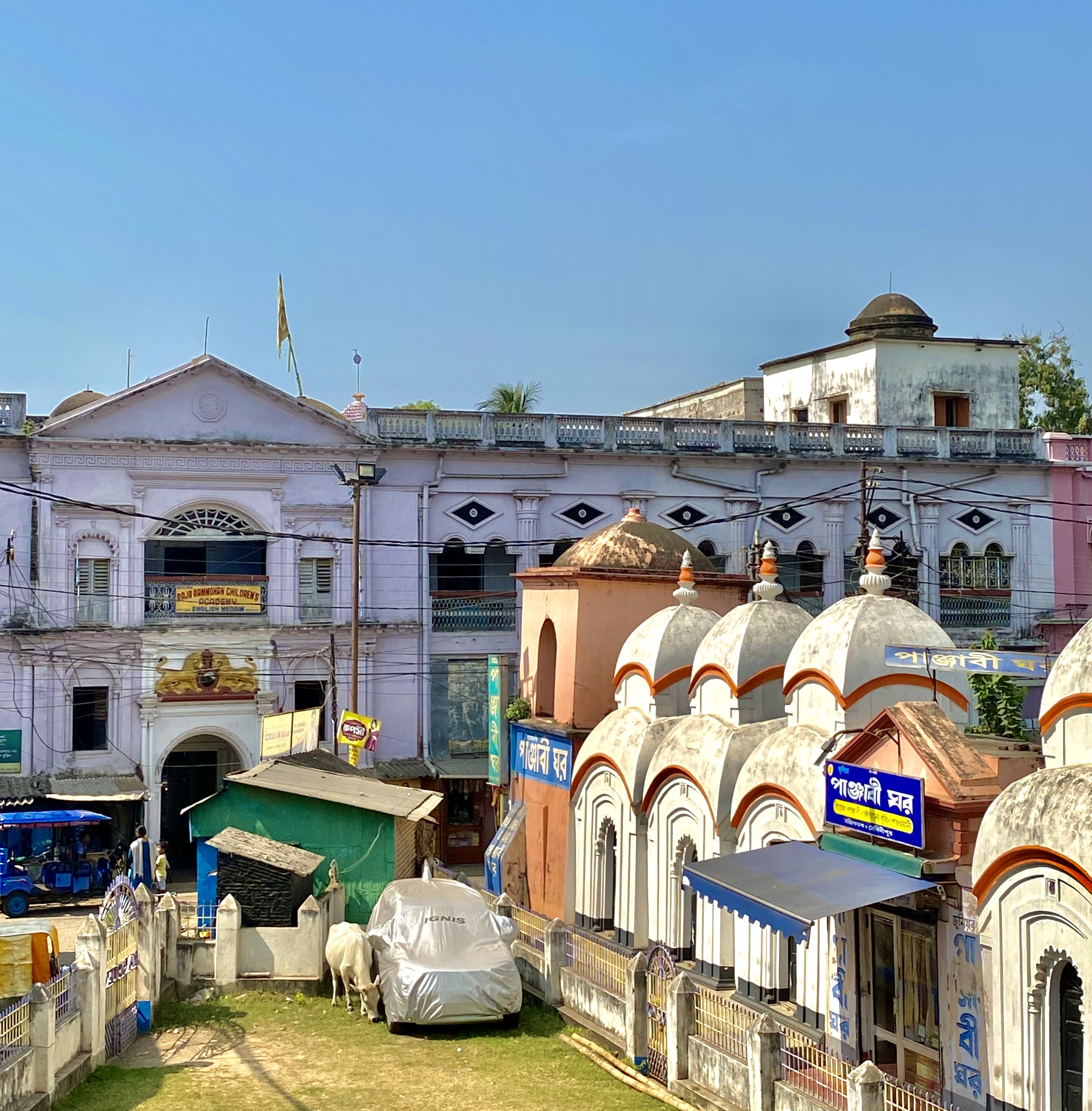
Front Facade of the Mallick Bari, with four of the twelve Shiva temples visible

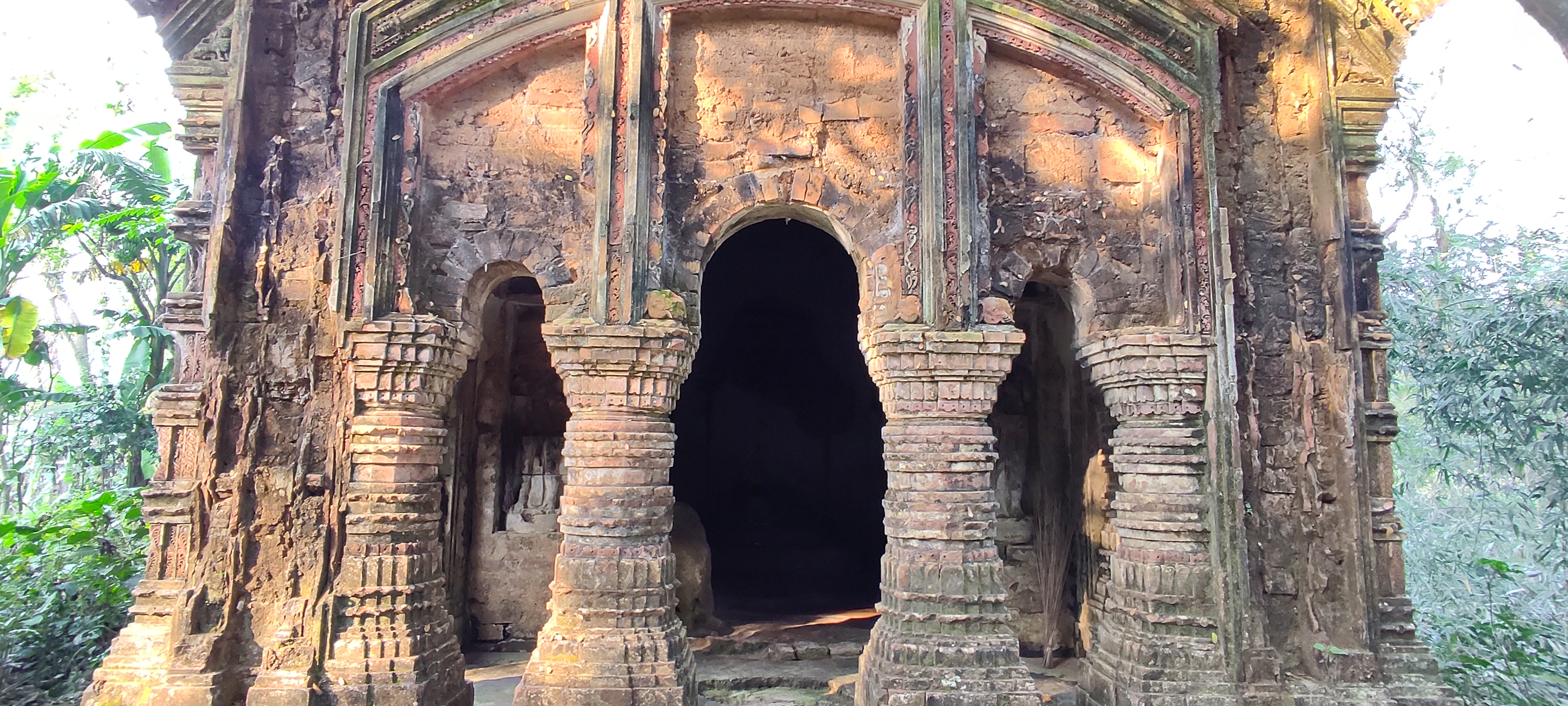
Sitaram Temple of the Mallicks in Debra

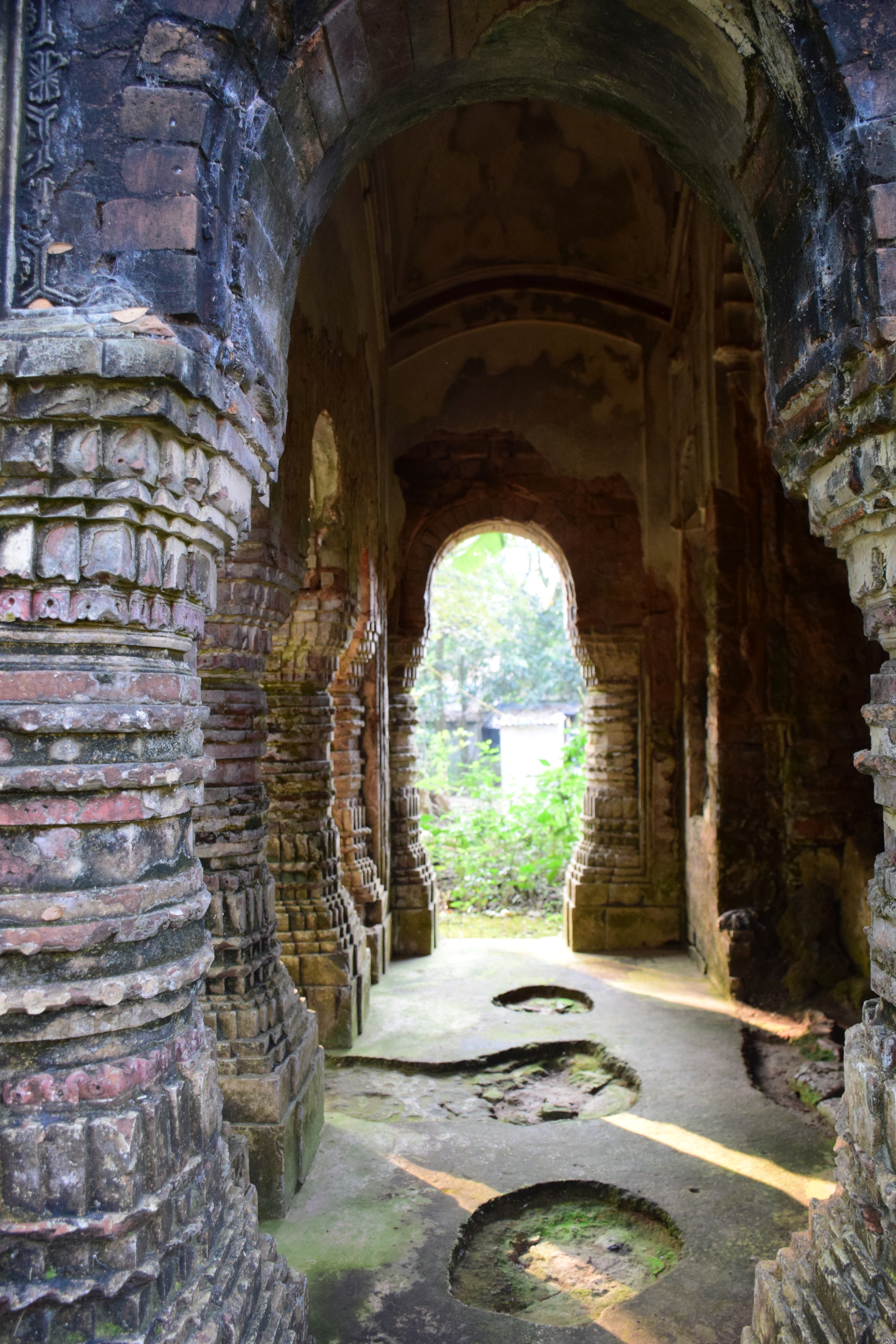
Sitaram Temple, Debra

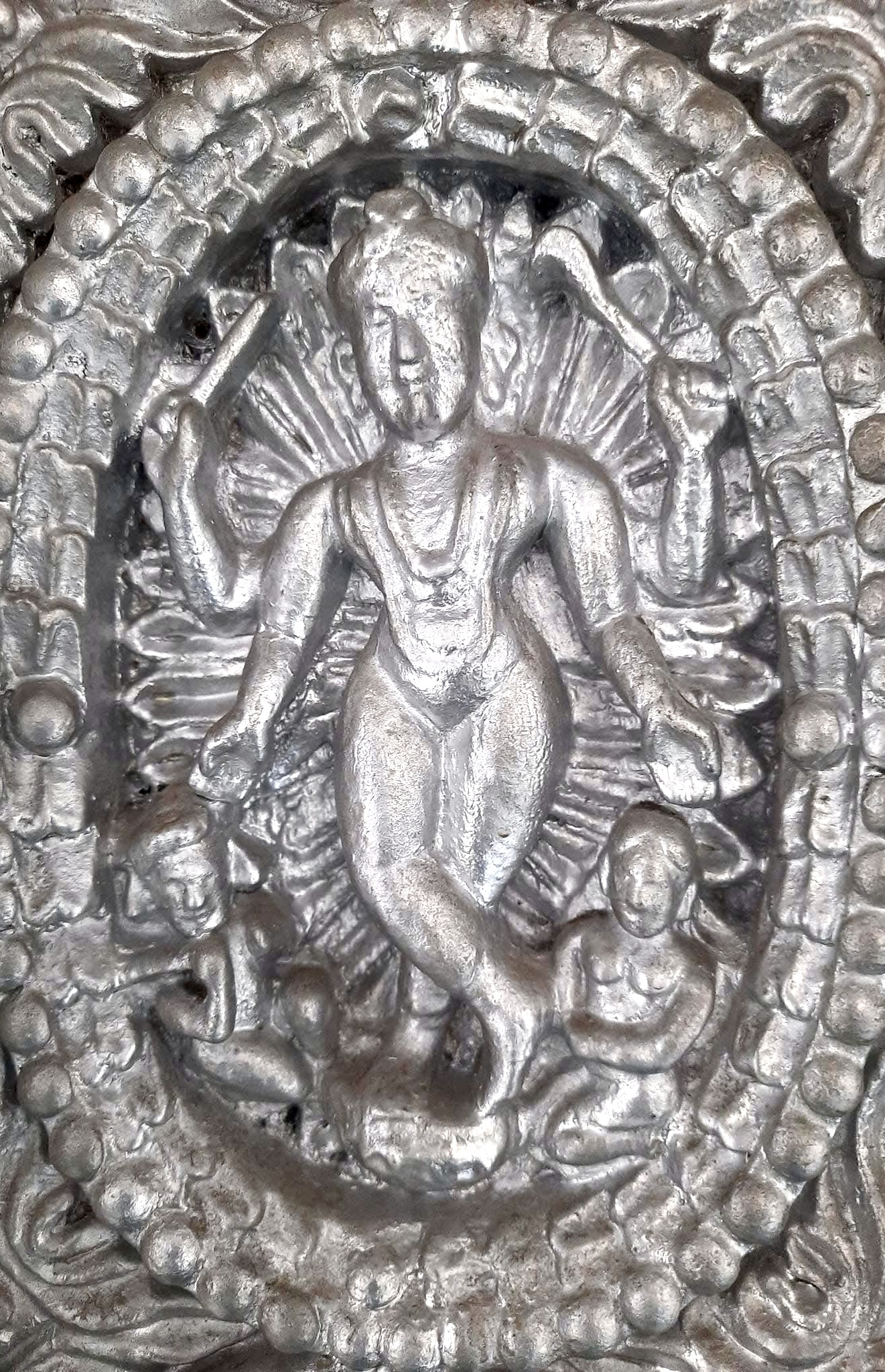
Silverclad KrishnaKali, Radhakanta Jiu

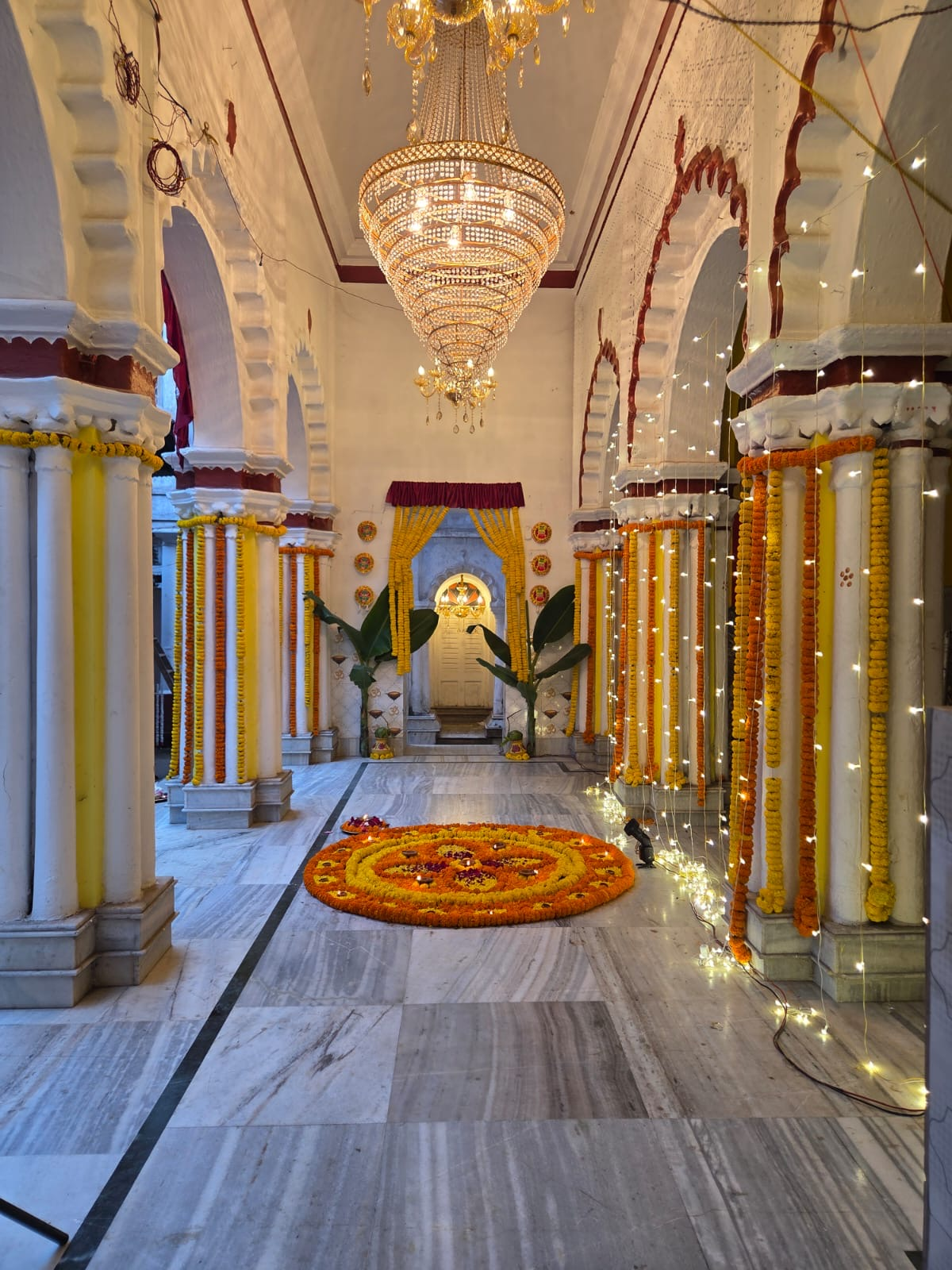
Durga Dalan

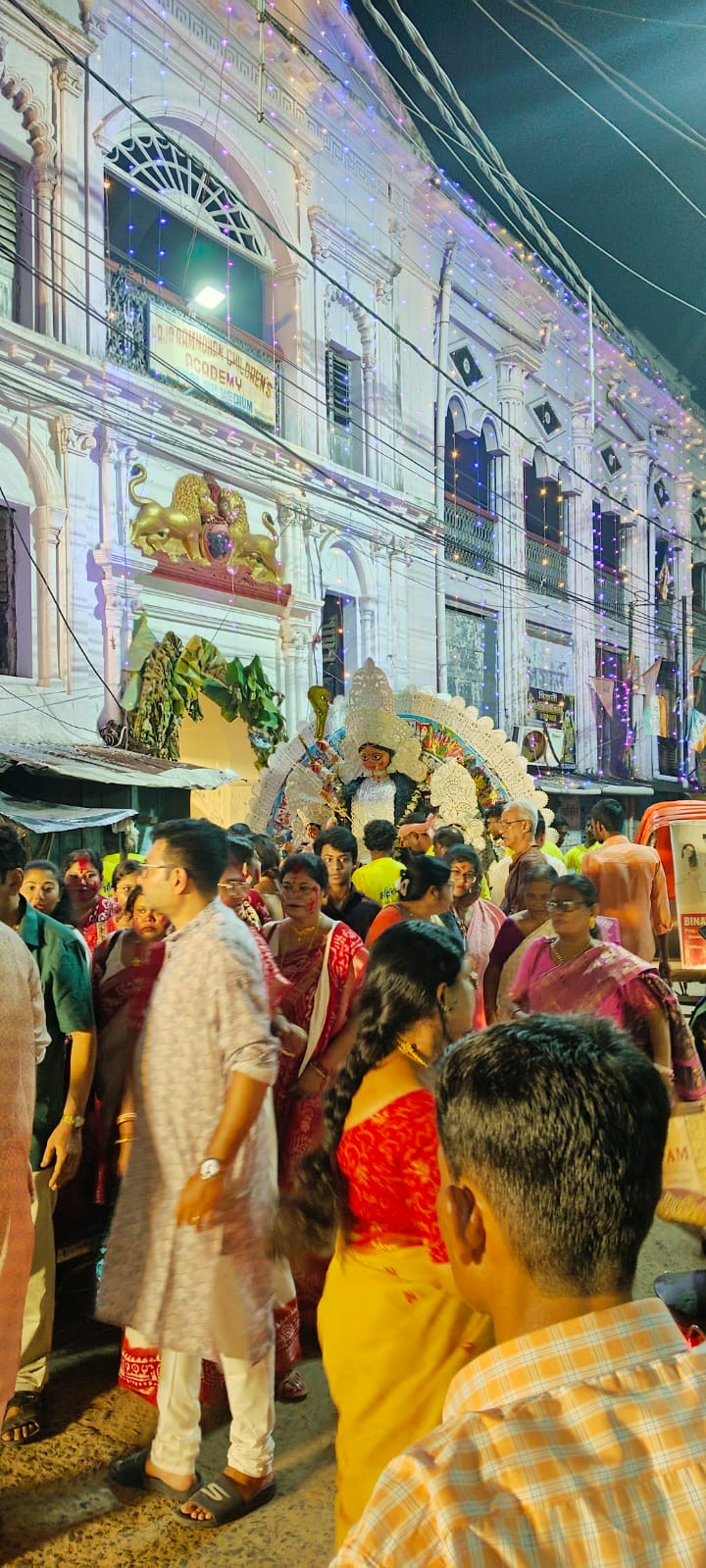
Bisharjan, Durga Puja

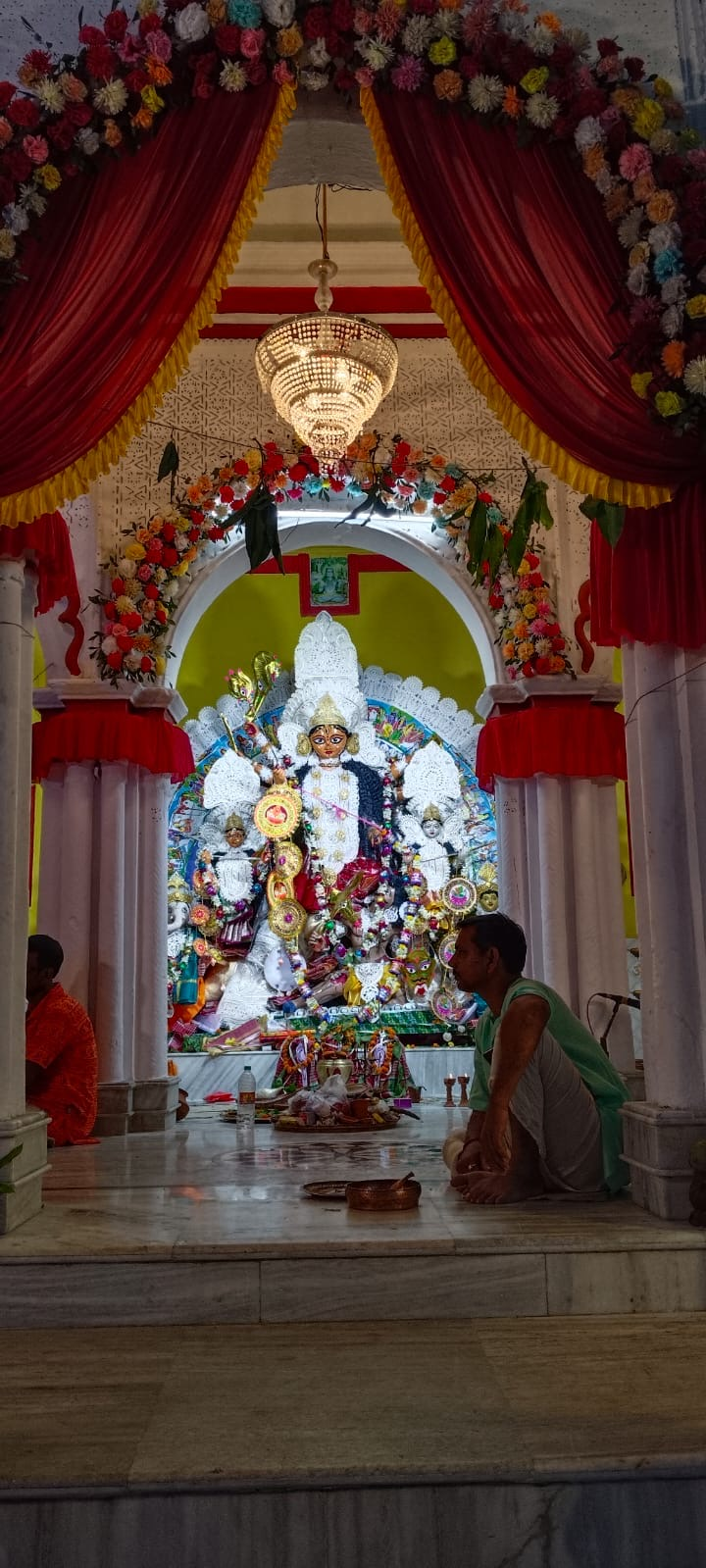
Durga Puja, 2024

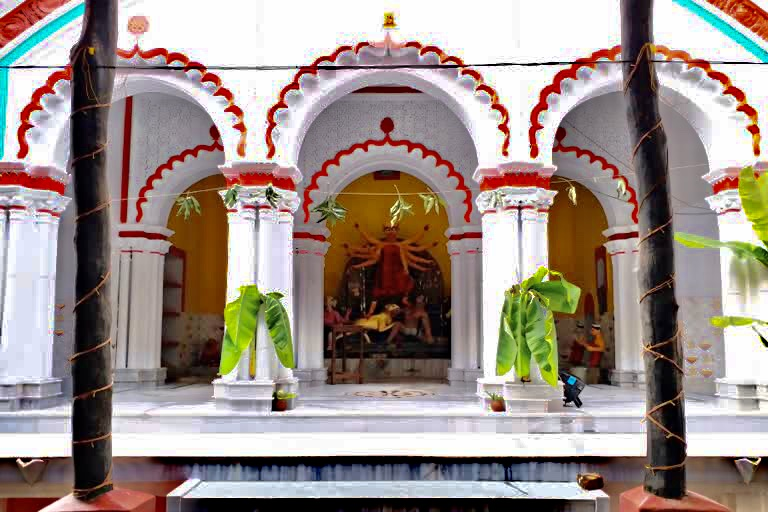
Durga Puja Dalan
