= Bagla =

- Village
- Location within Haryana Location within India
- Coordinates: 29.190120°N 75.464100°E
- Country: India
- State: Haryana
- District: Hisar

Government
  - Type: Local government
  - Body: Panchayat

Languages
  - Official: Hindi
- Time zone: UTC+5:30 (IST)
- PIN: 125052
- Vehicle registration: HR-20
- Website: haryana.gov.in

Bagla is a small village in Adampur Mandal, Hisar District, Haryana State, India. Bagla is 13 km from its mandal main town Adampur along the Hisar-Adampur road. Bagla is 26 km from its district main city Hisar, and 265 km from its state main city Chandigarh.

== History ==
When the first families settled in the village, they brought bullock carts called buggi. The village was called "buggi wala" because these buggi were a new thing for this area. Over time, "buggi wala" was shortened to Bagla.

== Transportation ==
The road connecting with district headquarters is known as Bagla Road, and in modern times this road has become a national highway.

== People ==
Members of several castes live together in the village. The main occupation of the villagers in the past has been agriculture but in modern times many young people are finding occupations according to their interests. Many youngsters of this village currently doing business in the field of transportation and packing, moving companies. Moreover there is a renowned name in the field of vehicle electronic manufacturer UNO MINDA is also from bagla. The founder of this company Shri Shadi Lal Minda was born and brought up in this Village. Also there is a NGO in the village which name is Bagla Yuva Shakti which is focused on the greenery in the village. They planted more than 3000 plants in past 3 years to develop the village environment.

== Infrastructure ==
Bagla has a government high school and two primary schools. There is a private senior secondary school, Moga Devi Minda Memorial School.

Bagla also has a temple of Jwala Mata, a multipurpose hall. and a multispeciality hospital named SL Minda Memorial Hospital. Bagla also has a historic temple called Nyolgar Dada Mandir.

== Government ==
Bagla is in the Adampur Assembly segment constituency. The local governing body in Bagla is Panchayat. The current head of Panchayat, called as Sarpanch, is Jugan Kishore.
