= Kotla, Himachal Pradesh =

Kotla Shahpur kotla
- town
- Location in Himachal Pradesh, India Kotla (India)
- Coordinates: 32°14′0″N 76°2′0″E
- Country: India
- State: Himachal Pradesh
- District: Kangra

Government
  - Body: gram sabha
- Elevation: 400 m (1,300 ft)

Population
  - Total: 5,000

Languages
  - Official: Hindi
- Time zone: UTC+5:30 (IST)
- PIN: 176205
- Telephone code: 01893
- Vehicle registration: HP- 54
- Coastline: 0 kilometres (0 mi)
- Nearest city: Nurpur
- Literacy: 50%%
- Lok Sabha constituency: Kangra
- Civic agency: gram sabha
- Climate: Moderate (Köppen)
- Avg. summer temperature: 37 °C (99 °F)
- Avg. winter temperature: 6 °C (43 °F)

Kotla is a small hill town situated on the Pathankot–Dharamshala road, in Himachal Pradesh, India. It is located in the Kangra district. The town is about 45 kilometres (28 mi) from Pathankot and the same distance from Dharamshala. Its geographical coordinates are 32° 15' 0" North, 76° 2' 0" East.

This hill town is situated in the lap of the Dhauladhar hills, in the Kangra valley of Himachal Pradesh. A hill stream cuts through the town. Across the stream is a 100-year-old bridge connecting the two sides of the town but now a new morden engineering bridge comes in use instead of old one. The town is famous for Kotla Fort, the Bagula Mukhi temple, and a number of additional religious places.

The Dehar Khad stream is an all-season stream, with fresh water coming from the higher Chamba ranges. The stream has a water mill, the ancient water-run Gharat, which is used to make flour from grains. There is another unit which makes local ice cream with the refrigeration machine powered by the flow of river water.

There is a fish tank situated about 5 km from the hill town, in the village of Soldha, which is also an interesting locality. Nearby there is a Tibetan monastery with excellent carvings and a large statue of Buddha. Just 1 km away on the Dharamshala road is Ram Tirath Ashram. Another 1 km further on there is a Hanuman mandir on the roadside. About 3 km from the town of Kotla is the Trilokinath Temple, famous for its natural cave with a Shiva lingam.
