= Lal Pratap Singh =

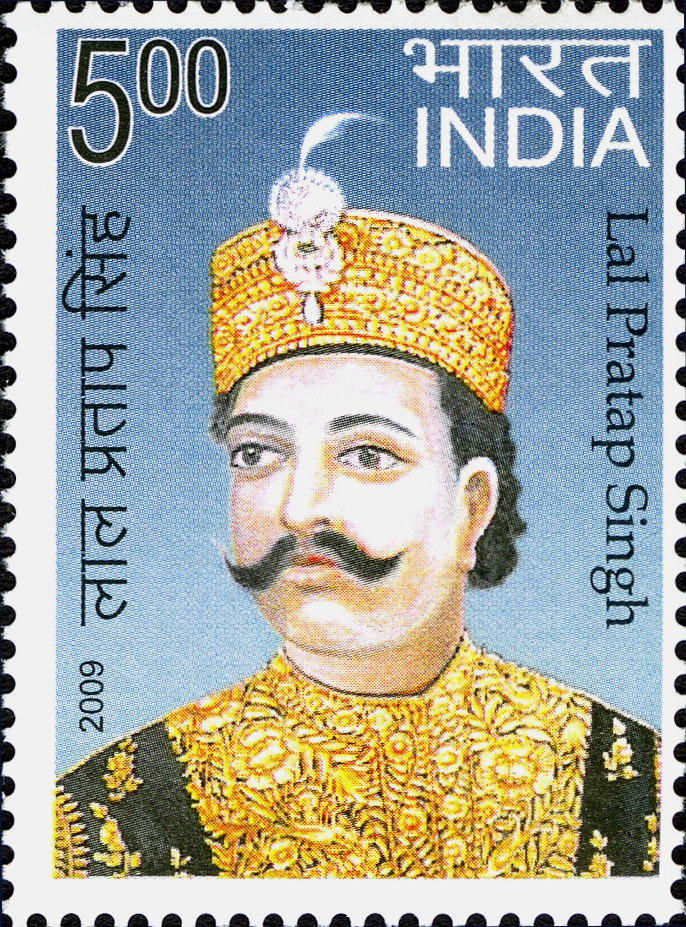
- Born: Kalakankar, Uttar Pradesh, India
- Died: 19 February 1858; Chanda, Sultanpur, Uttar Pradesh, India
- Relatives: Raja Rampal Singh(son)
- Military career
- Allegiance: Rajkumar of Kalakankar

Lal Pratap Singh was a member of the Bisen Rajput dynasty of Kalakankar. He was prominent leader in the Indian Rebellion of 1857. He was killed during the 1858 Battle of Chanda. The Government of India issued a postage stamp on 17 December 2009 to commemorate him. In 2023, a historical fiction work was published by the National Book Trust and authored by Souhardya De as part of the 75th anniversary of Indian Independence.

== Early life ==
Lal Pratap Singh born to Raja Hanumant Singh (1826–1885) in the zamindar of the Kalakankar of Partabgarh (now spelt Pratapgarh) near Allahabad in the Bengal Presidency of Colonial India during Company rule.

== Revolt of 1857 ==
During the turbulent period of 1857 Wajid Ali Shah, ruler of Awadh, was ousted by the East India Company and exiled to Calcutta. Begum Hazrat Mahal took over the regency of the State for her twelve-year-old son Birjis Qadr.

During these time Hanumant Pratap Singh (father of Lal Pratap Singh) was the Talukdar of Kalakankar.

The East India Company had enforced a system of taxation called "Mahalwari", which involved constantly increasing revenue demands with consequences disastrous to the landlords and farmers.

Their increasing indebtness led to dissatisfaction and the Talukdars sided with the Begum to reinstate the Nawab and overthrow the British. Their trained armies stood ready to assist Awadh at short notice.

== Pratap Jang Contingent ==
At the behest of the Begum, Hanumant Singh raised a battalion of 1000 soldiers under the command of his eldest son Lal Pratap Singh. This battalion, called "Pratap Jang" rose to action in February 1858 when the British under Colin Campbell, 1st Baron Clyde and Commander-in-Chief, India attempted the Capture of Lucknow.

Lord Campbell was aided by a Gurkha battalion and two Company battalions. The three forces summoned by the Begum, including the one from Kalakankar camped at Chanda in Sultanpur district of Uttar Pradesh awaiting the signal for battle.

On 19 February 1858, as the 'Pratap Jang' contingent sat down to breakfast, the army of East India Company attacked them. The soldiers of the 'Pratap Jang' picked up whatever weapon came to hand and pitched into the battle until ammunition ran out. Reinforcements were cut off by the Company troops and scattered remnants of other forces of the Talukdars had been forced to retreat.

== Killed by British ==
Lal Pratap Singh was advised to withdraw so that he could fight another day but the young warrior Lal Pratap led his troop into the final battle, of which the result was inevitable. many Indian soldiers and warriors died that day, among them was Lal Pratap Singh for whom a glorious death was preferable to the shame of cowardice. The humiliation inflicted on his body by the company troop commanders could not decimate the glory of great warrior Lal Pratap Singh. His untimely death devastated his father Hanumant Singh.

He left behind a young widow princess Diggach Kunwari and a son Raja Rampal Singh Singh who born in August 1848.

Lal Pratap Singh led a disciplined life and has been remembered by later generations.

== Commemoration ==
=== Postage stamp ===
The government of India commemorated Lal Pratap Singh by issuing a postage stamp and accompanying first day cover were designed by artist Suresh Kumar and Alka Sharma. The stamp is printed by Security Printing Press in Hyderabad.

=== Book ===
In 2023, Souhardya De published a historical fiction work called Pratap Jung: the Ultimate Sacrifice, inspired by Lal Pratap Singh. The book was published as part of India's 75th anniversary of Independence by the National Book Trust.

== See also ==
- List of people from Pratapgarh
