= Jagat Singh =

Jagat Singh may refer to:

== Rulers ==
- Raja Jagat Singh (1575–1646), Rajput soldier and ruler of the Nurpur kingdom, 1618–1646
- Jagat Singh I (1607–1652), Maharana of Mewar (Udaipur State), 1628–1652
- Jagat Singh II (1709–1751), Maharana of Mewar (Udaipur State), 1734–1751
- Jagat Singh of Amber (1786–1818), Maharaja of Amber and Jaipur, 1803-1818

== Others ==
- Jagat Singh (Sant) (1884–1951), Indian Surat Shabd Yoga practitioner
- Jagat Singh Mehta (1922–2014), Indian politician, Foreign Secretary of India
- Jagat Singh Jagga (1901/02–1931/32), Punjabi bandit
- Jagat Singh Negi (born 1957), Indian politician
- Jagat Singh (born 1968), Indian politician
