= Rampal Singh Gonda =

Indian politician (1937–2024)

Rampal Singh
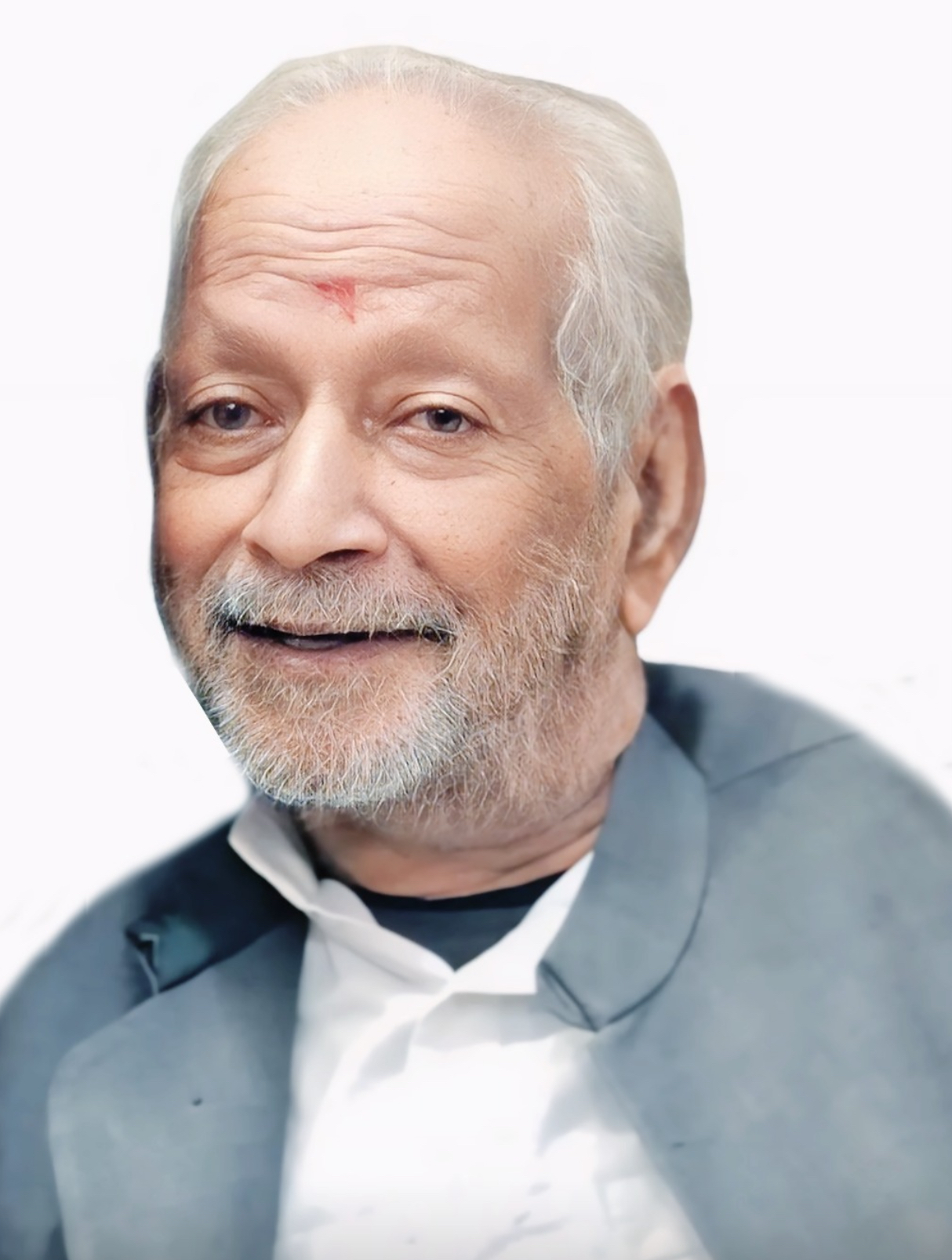
- Constituency: Mehnaun (formerly Mujehna)

Member of Uttar Pradesh Legislative Assembly
- In office 1985 – 1989 INC
- In office 1989 – 1995 INC
- In office 1996 – 2002 SP

Personal details
- Born: 10 July 1937 Bhorha Village, Uttar Pradesh, India
- Died: 23 March 2024 (aged 86) Gonda, Uttar Pradesh, India
- Party: Indian National Congress, Samajwadi Party
- Spouse: Late Vaidehi Singh
- Education: Lucknow University

Rampal Singh (10 July 1937 – 23 March 2024) was an Indian politician. He represented the Mehnaun constituency (formerly Mujehna) in Gonda, Uttar Pradesh, and was elected to the state assembly three times.

== Life and career ==
Rampal Singh studied at Lucknow University. He practiced law for several years. Later, he transitioned into politics.

As a member of the Indian National Congress, Singh held several key positions within the party. He served as the District President of the Indian National Congress Gonda. He actively participated in rallies and was known for his close association with senior leaders from the Gandhi family, Rajesh Pilot, N. D. Tiwari and Kunwar Anand Singh (Mankapur). Later in his career, Singh transitioned to the Samajwadi Party. During his political career, Singh was also sent to London as part of a delegation of MLAs to attend a political summit, representing India on an international platform.

In addition to his political career, Singh was a lawyer and an agriculturist. He was married to late Shrimati Vaidehi Devi.

After a prolonged illness and treatment at Medanta Hospital in Lucknow, Rampal Singh died on 23 March 2024 at his Gonda residence. He was 86.

== Sources ==
- "Mujehna Assembly Election 1996, Uttar Pradesh". www.empoweringindia.org.
- "State Election of 30 September 1996". 30 September 1996.
- "Statistical Report on General Election, 1996 to The Legislative Assembly of Uttar Pradesh" (PDF). Election Commission Of India.
