= Kalakankar =

- Village
- Location in Uttar Pradesh, India Kalakankar (India)
- Coordinates: 26.12458°N 81.53279°E
- Country: India
- State: Uttar Pradesh
- District: Pratapgarh

Government
  - Body: Gram panchayat

Languages
  - Official: HindiAwadhi
- Time zone: UTC+5:30 (IST)
- Vehicle registration: UP-72
- Website: up.gov.in

Kalakankar is a village in Pratapgarh district of Indian state Uttar Pradesh.

Kalakankar was a Taluqdari in British India. The famous Hindi poet Sumitranandan Pant lived here.

== Kalakankar estate ==
Kalakankar was an estate (taluqdari) of Oudh. The Taluqdari was controlled by Bisen clan of Rajputs.

Rulers and other prominent members of Kalakankar estate:-

- Roop Mall
- Hom Mall
- Purandar Mall
- Gopal Mall
- Ram Mall
- Askaran Mall
- Rudra Pratap Mall
- Todar Mall
- Dharu Shah Mall
- Varlas Rai Mall
- Jai Singh
- Shyam Singh
- Maau Singh
- Kamal Singh
- Lal Balwant Singh
- Lal Verisat Singh
- Raja Hanumant Singh
- Lal Pratap Singh
- Raja Rampal Singh
- Raja Awadhesh Singh
- Kunwar Suresh Singh
- Kunwar Brajesh Singh
- Raja Dinesh Singh
- Rajkumari Ratna Singh
