= Churthara =

- Village/Town
- Location in Uttar Pradesh Churthara (India)
- Coordinates: 27.415°N 78.435°E
- Country: India
- State: Uttar Pradesh
- District: Etah
- Tehsil: Awagarh
- Elevation: 170 m (560 ft)

Population (2011)
  - Total: 1,528

Languages
  - Official: Hindi
- Time zone: UTC+5:30 (IST)
- PIN: Awagarh Code - 207301
- Vehicle registration: UP 82

Churthara is a village in Awagarh tehsil, 23 kilometres (14 mi) from the district of Etah, in the Indian state of Uttar Pradesh. It is connected by State Highway 31 to other towns and villages. The nearby cities are Agra (50 kilometres (31 mi) southwest), Aligarh (70 kilometres (43 mi) northwest), and Vrindavan (80 kilometres (50 mi) west-northwest). The nearby railway station is located in Etah while the nearby airport is the Agra airport, 5 kilometers ( 3.1 ) From the sub district of Awagarh.

== Geography and climate ==
Churthara is located at the coordinates 27°24′54″N 78°26′06″E, at an elevation of approximately 170 metres (560 ft). The village is in the middle portion of the doab, the land between the Ganges and the Yamuna rivers.

Churthara features a semi-arid climate that borders on a humid subtropical climate, with mild winters, hot and dry summers and a monsoon season. The monsoons are not quite as heavy as the monsoon in other parts of India.

Churthara has four seasons. The winter season begins in December and ends in February. The month of January is the coldest month of the year. The spring begins in March, when hot and dry weather returns, and the temperatures start to rise until May, which is the hottest month of the year. The summer season begins in May and ends in September with the monsoon season starting in July preceded by the pre-monsoon by the end of June. August is the wettest month of the year, but the intensity of rainstorm decreases in the month of September as monsoon starts to withdraw. The autumn season begins in October, when post-monsoon rains occur. November is the driest month of the year.
