= Raja Awadhesh Singh =

- Raja of Kalakankar
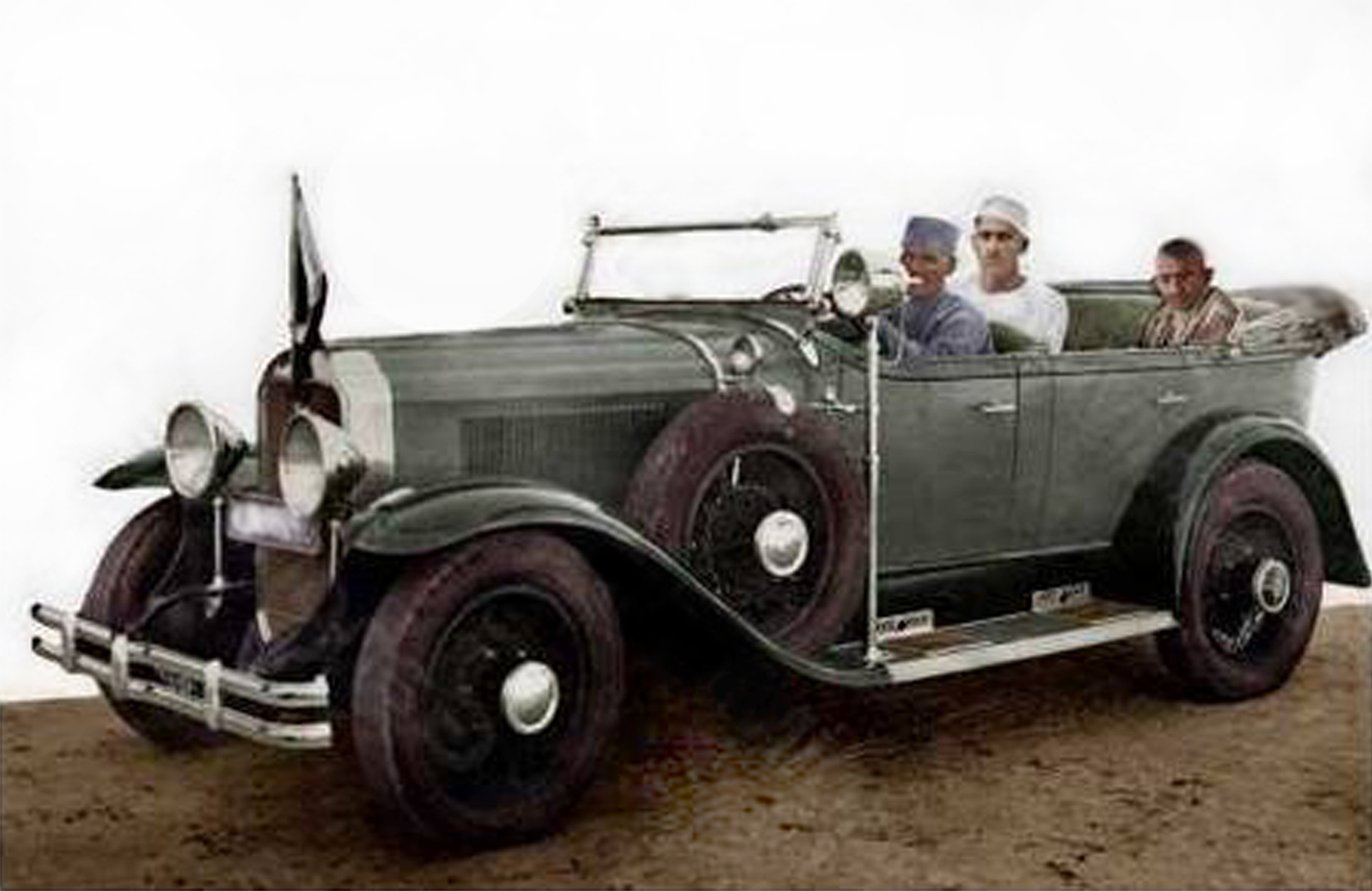
- Mahatma Gandhi with ruler of Kalakankar estate on 14 November 1929
- Predecessor: Raja Ramesh Singh
- Successor: Raja Dinesh Singh
- Born: 18 July 1848
- Died: 1 January 1933 (aged 84)
- Burial: Kalakankar
- Spouse: Laxmi Devi
- Issue: Dinesh Singh
- House: Bisen Rajput
- Religion: Hinduism

Raja Awadhesh Singh (died 1933) was Raja of Kalakankar estate of Oudh of British India, succeeded by Raja Ramesh Singh.

On 14 November 1929, Raja Awadhesh Singh met Mahatma Gandhi during his visit of Kalakankar. Kunwar Suresh Singh was his elder brother who was close to poet Sumitranandan Pant as well as associated with Mahatma Gandhi and took active participation in Gandhi's movement.

His son Raja Dinesh Singh served as minister of external affair in prime minister Indira Gandhi’s cabinet.

Raja Awadhesh (Avadesh) Singh Memorial Educational Society is named after him, its vice-president is his grand daughter Ratna Singh.

== See also ==
- Pratapgarh Estate
