= Raja Rampal Singh =

- Raja of Kalakankar
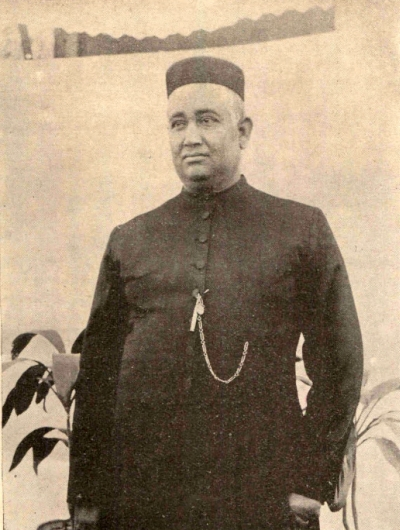
- Reign: 1885–1909
- Predecessor: Raja Hanumant Singh
- Successor: Raja Ramesh Singh
- Born: 22 August 1849; Rampur Dharupur, Kalakankar, Oudh, British India
- Died: 28 February 1909
- Spouse: Subhag Kunwar; Princess Alice (an English lady); Rani Radha (a muslim girl)
- Issue: Ramesh Singh
Names
- Raja Sir Rampal Singh of Kalakankar
- Father: Lal Pratap Singh
- Mother: Princess Diggach Kunwari
- Religion: Hinduism

Raja Rampal Singh (22 August 1849 – 28 February 1909) was a ruler of Kalakankar estate of Oudh (Now in Pratapgarh, Uttar Pradesh) from 1885 to 1909. Rampal Singh was a Congress sympathizer. He was one of the founding member of Indian National Congress Party. In consequence, Mahatma Gandhi and other congress leader used to visit him quite frequently. Pandit Madan Mohan Malviya had very intimate relations with Raja of Kalakankar. The Raja Saheb of Kalakankar had started a Hindi weekly, Hindusthan, in 1883 to spread the message of freedom.

His father Lal Pratap Singh, was a revolutionary during the Indian Rebellion of 1857 and was killed in the Battle of Chanda.

== Publication of Hindosthan ==
The Hindusthan was started by Raja Rampal Singh of Kalakankar. Even though, from the point of view of communications, this place was hardly suitable for publishing a newspaper, the Raja was fond of it and had it connected telegraphically. The only son of his father, Rampal Singh was ambitious. He learnt Hindi, English and Sanskrit, and became an honorary magistrate at the age of eighteen. He went to the United Kingdom, along with his wife. After two years she died and he came back to India with an English wife. He again returned to Britain. In August 1883, he started the monthly Hindosthan from the UK. This was in English and Hindi. Its Urdu edition was also brought out for some time. Later, it became a weekly. The articles in Hindi and Urdu were the Raja's own, those in English of Mr. George Temple's. He returned to Kalakankar in 1885, and started the country's first Hindi daily newspaper Hindosthan.

Hindosthan Published by Raja Rampal Singh and was edited by none other than the founder of the Benaras Hindu University, Madanmohan Malviya. Malviya joined work on two conditions: Raja would never meet him in an inebriated state and would not influence the newspaper’s editorial policy.

== Personal life ==
Raja Rampal Singh married firstly, to Rani Subhag Kunwar, who died about 1871 in London, and married secondly, Princess Alice (an English lady). He married thirdly, Rani Radha (a Muslim).

== Other ==
He was president of Akhil Bharatiya Kshatriya Mahasabha for year 1899. In 1905, Sir Chhotu Ram worked as the assistant Private Secretary to Raja Rampal Singh.
