= Awagarh =

Awagarh Municipal Council
- Municipal Council
- Awagarh
- Nickname: Awa
- Location in Uttar Pradesh, India
- Coordinates: 27°27′26″N 78°29′14″E
- Country: India
- State: Uttar Pradesh
- District: Etah
- Established: 12TH CENURTY thumbnail
- Founder: Raja Balwant Singh Ji

Government
  - Type: MLA, Chairman
  - Body: Municipal council

Area
  - Total: 6 km^{2} (2.3 sq mi)
  - Rank: 2nd

Population (2011)
  - Total: 59,990
  - Rank: 2nd in District
  - Density: 6/km^{2} (16/sq mi)
- Demonym: Awgarhites

Languages
  - Official: Hindi
- Time zone: UTC+5:30 (IST)
- Postal code: 207301
- Vehicle registration: UP-82

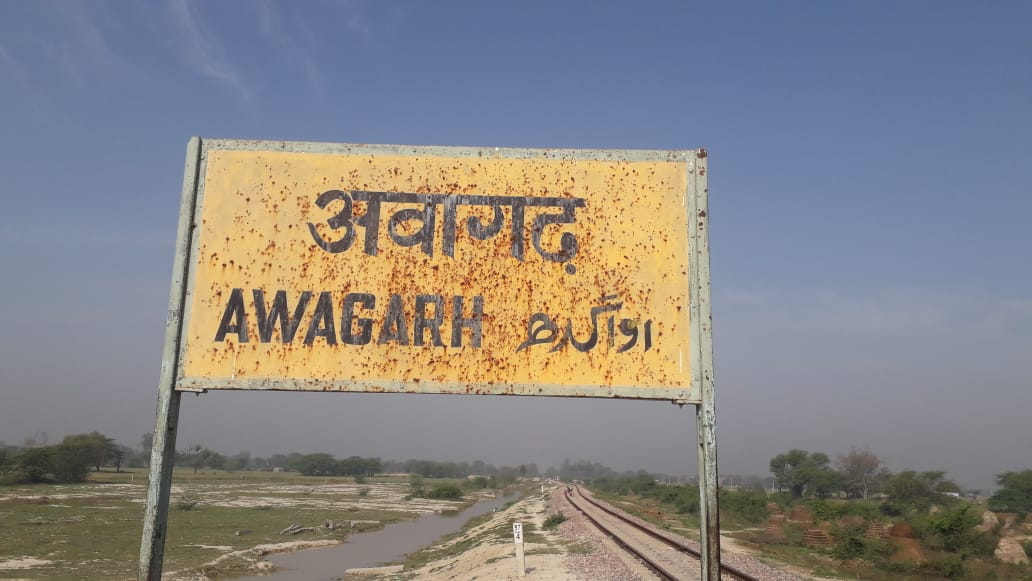

Awagarh is a historic town and municipality in Etah district in the state of Uttar Pradesh, India. Here stands a 108-acre pristine fort of yadav of the yaduvanshi clan, who after migration from Karauli had built this magnificent fortress in the 12th century on a tiny mound, claiming the biggest moat encircling around it. The fort is surrounded by lush green fields.

Raja Balwant Singh Ji of Awagarh, built a college named after him as Raja Balwant Singh College at Agra. He donated hundreds of acres of land to the college. He also helped Rabindra Nath Tagore to set up Shantiniketan. This city ranked first in district in Swachh Bharat Mission (Sahari) 2019 and second in state.

Awagarh is the largest town after the district.

== Amenities ==
The town has two police stations: Thana Kotwali, Kachpura and Mahila Thana, Main Chauraha.

Awagarh was built around a market which is roughly 3 kilometers in length.

Has its own Bus Stand and well connected to other cities.

== Buses and taxis are available to major cities of state and other parts of the country. ==
=== Railway ===
- Awagarh Railway Station
- Nearby (Tundla railway station)
- Nearby (Agra Cantonment)

== See also ==
- Churthara
- List of forts in Uttar Pradesh

== Events ==
- Shashtra Pujan every year on Vijay Dussehra held by Rajputs inside the fort.
- Rally of lord Shri Ram every year on Vijay Dussehra.
