= Bhinga =

- Nagar Palika
- Location in Uttar Pradesh, India Bhinga (India)
- Coordinates: 27.72°N 81.93°E
- Country: India
- State: Uttar Pradesh
- District: Shravasti
- Elevation: 120 m (390 ft)

Population (2011)
  - Total: 23,780

Languages
  - Official: Hindi
- Time zone: UTC+5:30 (IST)
- Vehicle registration: UP 46
- Website: up.gov.in

Bhinga is a town, Nagar Palika and the district headquarters of Shravasti district in the state of Uttar Pradesh, India.

== Genealogy ==
- Bhawani Singh
- Sarv Daman Singh
- Sheo Singh
- Jagat Singh
- Sarabjit Singh
- Krishna Dutt Singh
- Udai Pratap Singh
- Rajendra Bahadur Singh
- Virendra Kant Singh
- Chandra Mani Kant Singh
- Rudra Mani Kant Singh

== Geography ==
Bhinga is located at 27.72°N 81.93°E. It has an average elevation of 120 metres (393 feet). Shravasti shares its border with Balrampur district, Uttar Pradesh, Gonda district and Bahraich district and neighbouring nation Nepal. Bhinga, the district headquarters of Shravasti, is approximately 166 kilometres away from the state capital, Lucknow. Shravasti, located on the northeastern border of Uttar Pradesh, is close to River Rapti.

== Demographics ==
Religions in Bhinga town(2011)
Religion	Percent
Islam	56.95%
Hinduism	42.53%
Other or not stated	0.52%

As of the 2011 Census of India Bhinga had a population of 23,780. Males constitute 53% of the population and females 47%. Bhinga has an average literacy rate of 45%, lower than the national average of 59.5%; with male literacy of 53% and female literacy of 37%. 18% of the population is under 6 years of age.
