= List of people from Pratapgarh =

This is a list of notable personalities from Pratapgarh, Uttar Pradesh, India.

== Literature and science ==
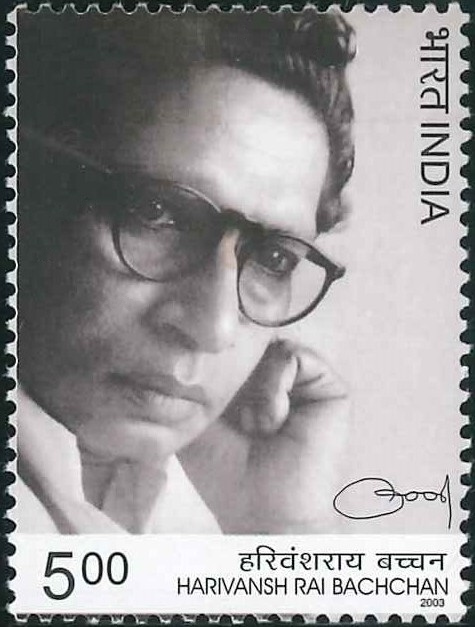
Harivansh Rai Bachchan

- Harivansh Rai Bachchan
- Sumitranandan Pant
- Imran Pratapgarhi
- Nazish Pratapgarhi
- Nirjhar Pratapgarhi
- Jumai Khan Azad
- Bhikhari Das
- Deepak Dhar

== Independence activists ==
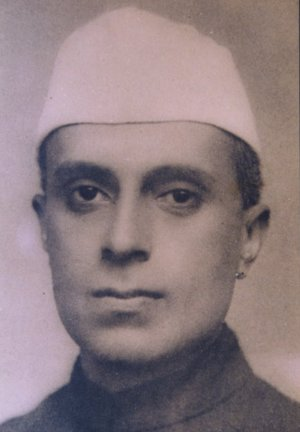
Jawaharlal Nehru

- Baba Ram Chandra
- Lal Pratap Singh
- Pandit Munishwar Dutt Upadhyay
- Roop Nath Singh Yadav
- Pandit Jawaharlal Nehru
- Pandit Madan Mohan Malaviya
- Rajaram Kisan

== Saints and religious icons ==
- Swami Karpatri
- Jagatguru Kripalu Maharaj
- Ram Vilas Vedanti
- Avimukteshwarananda Saraswati

== Politicians ==
- Pandit Munishwar Dutt Upadhyay
- Ajit Pratap Singh
- Deenanath Sewak (Ex. M.L.A. and Ex. Minister, Government of Uttar Pradesh)
- Dinesh Singh
- Swami Karpatri
- Brajesh Singh
- Roop Nath Singh Yadav
- Feroze Gandhi
- Ram Vilas Vedanti
- Raghuraj Pratap Singh alias Raja Bhaiya
- Rajkumari Ratna Singh
- Akshay Pratap Singh
- Pramod Tiwari
- Nagendra Singh Munna Yadav
- Shyama Charan Gupta
- Babulal Gaur
- Abhay Pratap Singh
- Raja Ram Pandey
- Rajendra Pratap Singh alias Moti Singh
- Vinod Saroj
- Aradhana Misra
- Shivakant Ojha
- Sangam Lal Gupta
- Ram Singh Patel
- Brijesh Mishra Saurabh

== Bollywood ==
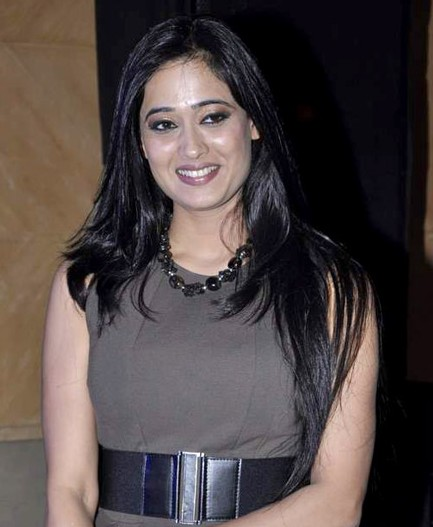
Shweta Tiwari

- Bachchan family, origins lay in the village of Babupatti in Pratapgarh district
- Anupam Shyam Ojha
- Shweta Tiwari
- Abhay Shukla

== Sport ==
- Manoj Tiwary

== Holders of High Constitutional Offices ==
=== Lieutenant Governor of other states ===
- Rai Bajrang Bahadur Singh (Himachal Pradesh)

=== Minister of External affair, India ===
- Dinesh Singh

== See also ==
- List of people from Uttar Pradesh
- Pratapgarh district, Uttar Pradesh
