= Medni Singh =

Kunwar Medni Singh (around 1857) was a member of royal family of Pratapgarh of Oudh, British India. He established a town near Pratapgarh of Uttar Pradesh, at present known as Katra Medniganj after him.

== Biography ==
He was a sibling of Babu Gulab Singh, a freedom fighter of First Independence War of 1857 and Taluqdar from Pratapgarh Estate, Awadh. His brother Babu Gulab Singh who established a village, at present known as Katra Gulab Singh, located on the bank of Bakulahi River; 30 km toward south from Pratapgarh district headquarters Bela Pratapgarh. It is said that Medni Singh also participated in 1857 Revolution War against British Raj along with his brother. Possibly, he was son of Raja Chhatradhari Singh Somavanshi of Pratapgarh (now part of Uttar Pradesh).

== Legacy ==
Katra Medniganj, a town and Nagar Panchayat in Pratapgarh district of Indian Uttar Pradesh state, is named after him.
