= Heeraganj =

Heeraganj, Uttar Pradesh Heeraganj, Pratapgarh
- Village
- Location in Uttar Pradesh, India Heeraganj, Uttar Pradesh (India)
- Coordinates: 25.91613°N 81.86077°E
- Country: India
- State: Uttar Pradesh
- District: Pratapgarh

Government
  - Body: Gram panchayat

Languages
  - Official: HindiAwadhi
- Time zone: UTC+5:30 (IST)
- Vehicle registration: UP

Heeraganj is a village in Kunda tehsil, Babaganj block basically famous by her attitude Posted by gaurav pandit Pratapgarh district of Indian state Uttar Pradesh.

The village is known for pilgrim destination of ancient Nayar Devi Temple.

== Geography ==
Heeraganj located at 25.91613°N 81.86077°E. It elevates (altitude) 110 meter above sea level. It is about 45 kilometer away from the district headquarters Bela Pratapgarh.

== Tourism ==
Nayar Devi Temple is an old shrine situated in Heeraganj village. It is dedicated Hindu mother goddess Nayar, which said to be appeared from earth.

== Transport ==
All kinds of road and railway facilities are easily accessible to reach Heeraganj. It has distance of 55 from Allahabad and 45 kilometer from Pratapgarh. Heeraganj is reachable by nearest railway station such as Kunda Harnamganj, Garhi Manikpur, Bhadri.Lalganj, Kunda, Kalakankar, Babaganj are the nearby towns to Heeraganj.
