= Sarabjit =

Sarabjit or Sarbjit is a gender-neutral Punjabi Indian and Pakistani given name. Notable people with the name include:

- Rai Sarabjit Singh (1853–1910), Ruler of Bhadri (estate)
- Sarabjit Ladda (born 1982), Indian cricketer
- Sarabjit Singh (1963/1964–2013), Indian national convicted of terrorism in Pakistan
- Sarabjit Singh Dhillon, Indian general
- Sarbjit Cheema, Punjabi singer
- Sarbjit Dusang (born 1952), Canadian field hockey player
- Sarbjit Singh Chadha (born 1952), Indian singer
