= Nayar Devi Temple =

Hindu temple in Uttar Pradesh, India

Maa Nayar Devi Temple is old Hindu temple located in the village of Heeraganj, Kunda, Pratapgarh of Uttar Pradesh, India.

The temple is mainly dedicated to the mother goddess Nayar, considered to be the same as Shakti. The ideal of goddess Nayar is a natural rock in the form of Shakti, which is said to have appeared from the earth for benefit of devotees.

== History ==
Once upon a time in the village of Heeraganj, a group gypsy was staying. The nomad moved and left his treasure buried in the ground; coming back to the place where the treasure had been, he found it had been dug up and received a statue of the goddess Nayar.

On the temple premises, a fair is organized every Thursday. Navratri and other religious events are celebrated here. The shrine Nayar Devi is 55 kilometers from Allahabad Prayag and 45 kilometers from Belha Pratapgarh.
