= Munishwar =

Munishwar is a masculine given name found in India. Notable people with this name include:

- Munishwar Chandar Dawar (born 1946), an Indian physician
- Munishwar Dutt Upadhyay (1898–1983), an Indian politician
- Munishwar Nath Bhandari (born 1960), an Indian judge
