= Jeet Lal =

Indian politician

Jeet Lal Patel

Member of the Uttar Pradesh Legislative Assembly
- Incumbent
- Assumed office 2022
- Preceded by: Rakesh Kumar Verma
- Constituency: Vishwanathganj

Personal details
- Born: 1969 (age 55–56); Vishwanathganj, Pratapgarh district, Uttar Pradesh
- Political party: Apna Dal (Soneylal)

Jeet Lal Patel (born 1969) is an Indian politician from Uttar Pradesh. He is a member of the Uttar Pradesh Legislative Assembly from Vishwanath Ganj Assembly constituency in Pratapgarh district. He won the 2022 Uttar Pradesh Legislative Assembly election representing the Apna Dal (Soneylal).

== Early life and education ==
Patel is from Vishwanath Ganj, Pratapgarh district, Uttar Pradesh. He is the son of Mata Pher. He completed his graduation at a college affiliated with Allahabad University in 1991.

== Career ==
Patel won from Vishwanath Ganj Assembly constituency representing Apna Dal (Soneylal) in the 2022 Uttar Pradesh Legislative Assembly election. He polled 89,762 votes and defeated his nearest rival, Saurabh Singh of the Samajwadi Party, by a margin of 48,052 votes.
