= Rai Jagat Bahadur Singh =

- Ruler of Bhadri
- Predecessor: Rai Jagmohan Singh
- Successor: Rai Sarabjit Singh
- Died: 15 February 1878; Ramchaura Ghat
- House: Bisen
- Father: Sheoratan Singh
- Religion: Hinduism

Rai Jagat Bahadur Singh (died 15 February 1878) was the ruler of Bhadri (estate) of Oudh. After the murder of Rai Jagmohan and his son Bishnath by Nazim at Ramchaura Ghat on the bank of Ganges, Bhadri was then given to Amarnath Singh, nephew and adopted son of Rai Jagmohan Singh, who was succeeded by his adopted son, Jagat bahadur Singh, whose father Sheoratan Singh, was hanged at Allahabad in 1857. Jagat Bahadur Singh also died without issue, and adopted Rai Sarabjit Singh, who received the hereditary title of Rai from the British government in November 1879.

== See also ==
- Pratapgarh Estate
- Bhadri
