= Raghuraj Pratap Singh =

Indian politician

- Raja Bhaiya in 2026

Leader, JD(L) in Uttar Pradesh Legislative Assembly
- Incumbent
- Assumed office 29 March 2022
- Deputy: Vinod Saroj

Member of the Legislative Assembly, Uttar Pradesh
- Incumbent
- Assumed office 1993
- Preceded by: Shiv Narain Mishra
- Constituency: Kunda

Minister of Food and Civil Supplies & Prison
- In office 2004–2007; 2012–2017

Minister of Sports and Youth Welfare, Prantiya Vikas Dal
- In office 1999–2000; 2000-2002

Minister of Programme Implementation
- In office 1997–1999

Personal details
- Born: 31 October 1969 (age 57) Calcutta (present-day Kolkata), West Bengal, India
- Party: Jansatta Dal (Loktantrik) (2018–present)
- Other political affiliations: Independent (1993–2018)
- Spouse: Bhanvi Kumari (m. 1995)
- Relations: Bajrang Bahadur Singh (grandfather); Radha Charan Singh (maternal grandfather); Ranjeet Singh Judeo (maternal uncle)
- Children: 4 (2 sons and 2 daughters)
- Education: University of Lucknow (1989)
- Profession: Politician
- Nickname: Raja Bhaiya
- Pretender information
- Title(s): Heir apparent of Bhadri
- Monarchy abolished: Sovereign Monarchy; 1947 (Instrument of Accession); Titular Monarchy; 1971 (26th Amendment of the Indian Constitution)
- Last monarch: Rai Bajrang Bahadur Singh

Raghuraj Pratap Singh, (born 31 October 1969), commonly known as Raja Bhaiya, is an Indian politician, currently serving as a Member of Legislative Assembly (MLA) in the 18th Uttar Pradesh Assembly, representing the Kunda assembly constituency of Pratapgarh.

He has been elected as an MLA for the seventh consecutive time since 1993 from the same constituency. In 2018, he founded and became the national president of Jansatta Dal Loktantrik party. Singh has held various Cabinet Minister positions in the Government of Uttar Pradesh of both Samajwadi Party and Bharatiya Janata Party administrations.

== Early life and education ==
Raja Bhaiya was born on 31 October 1969 in Calcutta (now Kolkata), West Bengal in a Rajput family. His father is Uday Pratap Singh and hails from the Bhadri (estate) of Oudh. His mother is Manjul Raje, daughter of last ruling Maharaja Radha Charan Singh of Samthar State and sister of six-term MLA Ranjeet Singh Judeo. His grandfather, Bajrang Bahadur Singh, served as the first vice-chancellor of Pant Nagar Agriculture University and subsequently as the second Lieutenant Governor of Himachal Pradesh state. Raghuraj was the first in his family to enter politics; his father is largely a recluse. Bajrang Bahadur Singh had no son, so he adopted his nephew Uday Pratap Singh as his son.

He graduated from University of Lucknow in 1989. He married Bhanvi Kumari Singh on 15 February 1995, with whom he has two sons and two daughters. As per his election affidavit, Singh is an agriculturalist by profession.

== Political career ==
In the 2007 Uttar Pradesh Legislative Assembly election, he was overwhelmingly elected from Kunda with a margin of nearly half the votes cast over Shiv Prakash Mishra of the Bahujan Samaj Party. He had stood as an independent.

He also wields considerable influence over five assembly constituencies in the Pratapgarh region, as well as some in neighbouring Bihar. In election rallies in this region where he is present, the actual candidate may never speak or even be mentioned in his speech. After the 2007 elections, when Mayawati swept to power with a majority, Raghuraj again came under the police radar.

In the 2017 Assembly election, Raghuraj Pratap Singh defeated his opponent Janki Sharan from the Bhartiya Janata Party by a huge margin of 103,647 votes and acquired 136,597 votes in total. In November 2018, Singh launched his own party, the Jansatta Dal Loktantrik.

In 2005, he became the minister for Food and Civil Supplies, and despite his pending criminal cases, he came to be assigned the highest level of security (Z-category) provided by the state, though the threats against him were not specified. In 2018, he voted for the Bharatiya Janta Party in the Rajya Sabha polls against the BSP candidate Bhimrao Ambedkar.

In 2019, his party contested the Lok Sabha polls alone on two seats of Pratapgarh and Kaushambi.

In the 2022 Uttar Pradesh Legislative Assembly election, Singh representing Jansatta Dal (Loktantrik) defeated Samajwadi Party's Gulshan Yadav of the Samajwadi Party by a margin of 30,315 votes, acquiring a total of 99,612. Singh has consecutively been elected as the representative of Kunda assembly for the seventh time in 2022.

== Controversies ==
=== POTA charges ===
In 2002, on an FIR filed by a dissident Bharatiya Janata Party (BJP) MLA Puran Singh Bundela of alleged kidnapping and threatening with dire consequences, got Raghuraj arrested on the orders of then Chief Minister Mayawati at the early hours about 4:00 A.M. of 2 November 2002. Later Mayawati-led government in Uttar Pradesh declared him a terrorist, and he was sent to jail under Prevention of Terrorism Act (POTA), along with his father Uday Pratap Singh and cousin Akshay Pratap Singh. Subsequently, Akshay managed to get bail, but Raghuraj's pleas were rejected many times. In June 2006, Raja Bhaiya was acquitted of all charges by a specially designated POTA court.

=== From jail to cabinet minister ===
Within 25 minutes of Mulayam Singh Yadav's government coming to power in 2003, all POTA charges against him were dropped. However, the Supreme Court of India debarred the state government from dismissing POTA charges. Eventually the POTA Act was repealed in 2004, and although the court again refused to release Raghuraj. He subsequently became a powerful man in the government, and was accused by police officer R.S. Pandey (who led the raid on his house) of having launched a vendetta against him. Eventually R.S. Pandey was killed in a road accident, which is currently being investigated by the CBI.

=== DSP Zia Ul Haq murder case ===
On 3 March 2013, Deputy Superintendent of Police (DSP) Zia Ul Haq was killed in Kunda, a constituency represented by Raghuraj Pratap Singh, during clashes that followed the shooting of the village head, Nanhe Lal Yadav. Following a complaint by the deceased officer's wife, Parveen Azad, a case was initiated against Raghuraj for his alleged involvement. The FIR identified Gulshan Yadav, the chairman of Kunda Nagar Panchayat, Harion Srivastava, a representative of Raja Bhaiya, Guddu Singh, Raja Bhaiya's driver, and two other villagers, Kamta Prasad Pal and Rajesh Kumar Pal, as primary suspects. Additional murder charges were filed against others named in the FIR. The Central Bureau of Investigation (CBI) took over the case, for further investigation. On 3 March 2013, Raja Bhaiya resigned from the state cabinet. On 1 August 2013, the CBI filed the final report in the CBI court giving a clean chit to Raja Bhaiya. On 11 October 2013, he was reappointed a cabinet minister with the portfolio of Food and Civil Supplies.

=== Dilerganj massacre ===
His name first surfaced in Dilerganj massacre case when bodies of young girls were found in river. A mob allegedly associated with him had torched a village where villagers had refused to pay protection money to local musclemen.

=== CBI probe ===
The CBI which was probing the killing of DSP Zia Ul Haq gave him a clean chit in 2013.

=== Irregularity in PDS ===
CBI probe in multi crore PDS scam was initiated. It was alleged that wheat & rice were diverged from Public Distribution System and even exported when he was minister of food & civil supplies.

=== Domestic abuse case ===
In 2025, an FIR was filed against him by his wife at a police station in Delhi for alleged physical and mental harassment.

== See also ==
- List of people from Pratapgarh
- Bhadri (estate)
