= Derwa, Uttar Pradesh =

Derwa, Uttar Pradesh Derwa
- Village
- Location in Uttar Pradesh, India Derwa, Uttar Pradesh (India)
- Coordinates: 25.91279°N 82.30666°E
- Country: India
- State: Uttar Pradesh
- District: Pratapgarh

Government
  - Body: Gram panchayat

Languages
  - Official: HindiAwadhi
- Time zone: UTC+5:30 (IST)
- Vehicle registration: UP
- Website: up.gov.in

Derwa is a village in Kunda tehsil of Pratapgarh district in the Indian state of Uttar Pradesh.
