= Rai Zalim Singh =

Ruler of Bhadri

Rai Zalim Singh was the ruler of Bhadri (estate) and from Bisen clan of Rajputs, succeeded in 1798 after the death of his father Rai Daljit Singh. His father was killed by Nazim Mirza Jan when he visited Bhadri and questioned about his revenue, with a view of revision, and quarrel ensured. In 1810, Rai Zalim Singh was thrown into prison at Lucknow for non payment of the revenue and the property was taken under direct management. While Zalim Singh was in prison, Thakurain Sheoraj Kunwar, his wife, visited Bhadri under pretext of performing some religious rites and there she assembled the clan and boldly collected the rents. She was besieged by the Chakladar, Jagat Kishor in the fort at Bhadri for eight days until orders came from Lucknow to stop attack and the courageous lady was permitted to occupy the castle. In 1815 the Rai Zalim Singh was released and recovered the state of Bhadri.

== See also ==
- Pratapgarh Estate
- Bhadri
