= Pratapgarh, Uttar Pradesh Assembly constituency =

Constituency of the Uttar Pradesh legislative assembly in India

Coordinates: 25.90°N 81.94°E

Pratapgarh
- Constituency No. 248 for the Uttar Pradesh Legislative Assembly

Constituency details
- Country: India
- Region: North India
- State: Uttar Pradesh
- District: Pratapgarh
- Lok Sabha constituency: Pratapgarh
- Total electors: 3,55,158
- Reservation: None

Member of Legislative Assembly
- 18th Uttar Pradesh Legislative Assembly
- Incumbent Rajendra Kumar Maurya
- Party: Bharatiya Janata Party
- Elected year: 2022
- Preceded by: Rajkumar Pal

Pratapgarh is a constituency of the Uttar Pradesh Legislative Assembly covering the city of Pratapgarh in the Pratapgarh district of Uttar Pradesh, India.

Pratapgarh is one of five assembly constituencies in the Pratapgarh Lok Sabha constituency. Since 2008, this assembly constituency is numbered 248 amongst 403 constituencies.

== Members of Legislative Assembly ==
Year	Member	Party
1967	Ajit Pratap Singh	Indian National Congress
1969	Ajit Pratap Singh	Indian National Congress
1974	Ajit Pratap Singh	Indian National Congress
1977	Sangamlal Shukla	Janata Party
1980	Lal Pratap Singh	Indian National Congress (I)
1985	Lal Pratap Singh	Indian National Congress
1989	Sangamlal Shukla	Janata Dal
1991	Brijesh Kumar Sharma	Bharatiya Janata Party
1993	Lal Bahadur Singh	Samajwadi Party
1996	Chandra Nath Singh	Samajwadi Party
2000^	Abdul Salam	Apna Dal
2002	Hari Pratap Singh	Bharatiya Janata Party
2007	Sanjay Tripathi	Bahujan Samaj Party
2012	Nagendra Singh Yadav	Samajwadi Party
2017	Sangam Lal Gupta	Apna Dal (Soneylal)
2019^	Rajkumar Pal	Apna Dal (Soneylal)
2022	Rajendra Maurya	Bharatiya Janata Party

== Election results ==
=== 2027 ===
2027 Uttar Pradesh Legislative Assembly election: Pratapgarh
Party	Candidate	Votes	%	±%
INDIA				
NDA				
BSP				
NOTA	None of the above			
Majority				
Turnout				
gain from		Swing		

=== 2022 ===
2022 Uttar Pradesh Legislative Assembly election: Pratapgarh
Party	Candidate	Votes	%	±%
BJP	Rajendra Kumar Maurya	89,762	45.8	
AD(K)	Krishna Patel	64,699	33.01	
BSP	Ashutosh Tripathi	19,249	9.82	−2.92
AIMIM	Israr Ahmed	6,480	3.31	−10.27
INC	Neeraj Tripathi	6,326	3.23	−9.98
NOTA	None of the above	1,336	0.68	−0.37
Majority		25,063	12.79	−7.13
Turnout		195,981	55.18	+11.08
BJP gain from AD(S)		Swing		

=== 2019 bypoll ===
2019 Pratapgarh assembly by election was won by Apna Dal (Sonelal) candidate Rajkumar Pal.

By-election, 2019: Pratapgarh
Party	Candidate	Votes	%	±%
AD(S)	Rajkumar Pal	52,949	35.51	−8.14
SP	Brijesh Verma	23,228	15.57	−.9.42
AIMIM	Israr Ahmad	20,269	13.58	
INC	Neeraj Tripathi	19,715	13.21	
BSP	Ranjeet Singh Patel	19,000	12.74	−9.81
BMP	Harikesh Kumar	3,456	2.32	
NCP	Praveen Kumar	2,531	1.70	
CPI	Nirbhay Pratap Singh	2,237	1.50	
Peace Party (India)	Abdul Mateen	1,612	1.08	
Sarvodaya Bharat Party	Mohammad Irshad	1,440	0.97	
NOTA	None of the above	1,568	1.05	−0.15
Majority		29,721	19.92	+1.26
Turnout		149,184	44.17	−11.80
AD(S) hold		Swing		

=== 2017 ===
Sangam Lal Gupta won in last Assembly election of 2017 Uttar Pradesh Legislative Elections defeating Samajwadi Party candidate Nagrenda Singh by a margin of 34,554 votes.

2017 Uttar Pradesh Legislative Assembly Election: Pratapgar
Party	Candidate	Votes	%	±%
AD(S)	Sangam Lal Gupta	80,828	43.65	
SP	Nagendra Singh Yadav	46,274	24.99	
BSP	Ashok Tripathi	41,750	22.55	
Independent	Shiv Ram Shukla	3,426	1.85	
Independent	Pramod Kumar	3,174	1.71	
NOTA	None of the above	2,191	1.2	
Majority		34,554	18.66	
Turnout		185,179	55.97	
