= Jethwara =

Jethwara, Uttar Pradesh
- Village
- Location in Uttar Pradesh, India Jethwara, Uttar Pradesh (India)
- Coordinates: 25.81221°N 81.77801°E
- Country: India
- State: Uttar Pradesh
- District: Pratapgarh

Languages
  - Official: Hindi Awadhi
- Time zone: UTC+5:30 (IST)
- Postal code: 230129
- Vehicle registration: UP
- Website: up.gov.in

Jethwara is a village in Lakshamanpur Mandal, Pratapgarh District in Uttar Pradesh, India located 14.7 km from its district main city Pratapgarh and 141 km from its state main city Lucknow.
