= Raniganj tehsil =

Raniganj
- Tehsil
- Country: India
- State: Uttar Pradesh
- District: Pratapgarh

Language
  - Official: Hindi
  - Additional official: Urdu
  - Local: Awadhi
- Time zone: UTC+5:30 (IST)
- PIN: 230304
- Telephone code: 05341
- Vehicle registration: UP-72
- Website: pratapgarh.nic.in

Raniganj is a tehsil in Pratapgarh district, Uttar Pradesh, India. It has a police station. It is represented by the Raniganj Uttar Pradesh Assembly constituency.

== Villages ==
As of the 2011 Census of India, the tehsil contains the following 302 villages:

- Almapur
- Amapur Bori
- Amari
- Amarpur
- Amli Dandh
- Arar
- Ashapur
- Ashipur
- Atri
- Audhanpur
- Auwar
- Babu Patti
- Baghevra
- Bairampur
- Bakulahi
- Balipur
- Banrahi
- Banvapur
- Banvarpur
- Barahda
- Barahimpur
- Barsanda
- Basant Patti
- Basha
- Basi
- Basi Adhar Ganj
- Basiraha
- Basirpur
- Baudh Patti
- Beerapur
- Behdaul Kala
- Behdaul Khurd
- Bhabhuvar
- Bhagesara
- Bhagipur
- Bhagwanpur Mufrid
- Bhaidaspur
- Bhaisauna
- Bhat Purwa
- Bhavani Garh
- Bhiti
- Bhojeymau
- Bhuidaha
- Bhujaini
- Bhusalpur
- Bichhur
- Bijemau
- Bikhanapur
- Biraipur
- Biraipur
- Bisambharpur
- Bisunpur Dariyapur
- Bisunpur Kala
- Bithalpur
- Bithalpur- 2
- Borra
- Budha Kumbhapur
- Chaghaipur
- Chaksara
- Chalakpur Bad Farosan
- Chalakpur Kurmiyan
- Chandelepur
- Chandi Patti
- Chandipur Govindpur
- Chandpur
- Chaubey Patti
- Chhanapur
- Chheetpur
- Chhitpalgarh
- Dadupur Mufarid
- Daherkala
- Dahery Khurd
- Daipur Adharganj
- Damdam
- Dariyapur (159666)
- Dariyapur (159693)
- Dauarikapur
- Dayalpur
- Delhupur
- Deva Garh Kamasin
- Devalaha
- Dewasa
- Dhanaupur
- Dhanuha
- Dhanvantari Patti
- Dhari
- Dhorka Mukrid
- Dighvat
- Dileeppur
- Divaini
- Dube Patti Ram Karan
- Dwarikapur
- Fatanpur
- Fatehpur Dariyapur
- Gaiapur
- Gambherpur Patti
- Ganai Dheeh
- Gaura Purey Badal
- Gavan Pati
- Ghatampur
- Ghorka Talukdari
- Gobardhanpur
- Gokula
- Gopalpur
- Gopalpur Mufrid
- Gulra
- Gyanpur
- Halamai
- Harinathpur
- Harparmau
- Harpur Soudh
- Hathaura Sarai
- Hathethi
- Himayunpur
- Husenpur
- Jaddupur
- Jagatpur
- Jagdishpur (159682)
- Jagdishpur (159716)
- Jairampur
- Jajapur
- Jamtali
- Jamunipur
- Jamuri
- Jariyari
- Jolhapur
- Kadipur
- Kahla
- Kaili Deeh
- Kali Muradpur
- Kalyani
- Kamasin
- Kanevra Purey Khushali
- Karka
- Kaseruva
- Kathindra
- Katrauli
- Kaulapur
- Kaulapur Nand Patti
- Kayasth Patti
- Kevara Kala
- Kevara Khurd
- Khakhapur
- Khalispur
- Khampur Dubey Patti
- Khar-Har
- Kharagpur
- Kharwanie
- Khemaipur
- Khushal Garh
- Kodar Deeh
- Kothhara
- Kothiyari
- Koyam
- Krmajeetpur
- Kura Deeh
- Kusfara
- Lachhipur
- Lapkan
- Lohar Tara
- Madhavapur
- Mah Devari
- Mahothari
- Makari
- Makwan
- Malhi
- Malhupur
- Mana Patti
- Manha Kalipur
- Manpur
- Manpur Pasiya
- Masauli
- Mathura
- Mau
- Medhauli Kala
- Medhauli Khurd
- Meerpur
- Meruva Deeh
- Mirjapur
- Mishrudeenpur
- Mohammadpur
- Muar Adhar Ganj
- Nabhapur
- Naharpur
- Nai Koat
- Najiyapur
- Namaksayar
- Narainpur Kala
- Narainpur Khurd
- Narharpur
- Nari
- Narsinghpur
- Naseerpur
- Nasirpur
- Naubasta
- Naudera
- Navhar Husenpur
- Nidhi Patti
- Nirbhay Patti
- Pacharas
- Padhva
- Pali
- Parasrampur
- Pareytara
- Parsa Mau
- Pathari Kala
- Pathariya Khurd
- Pipari
- Prajapatipur
- Premdhar Patti
- Pupipur
- Puranpur Pathkhan
- Pure Goliya
- Pure Hiraman
- Pure Lal Pandey
- Pure Mohan
- Pure Tula
- Purela
- Purey Basau
- Purey Bhaiyaji
- Purey Bhogi
- Purey Bichhur
- Purey Chandan
- Purey Charan
- Purey Dukhan
- Purey Gangaram
- Purey Ghanshyam
- Purey Gosain
- Purey Gosay
- Purey Harsan
- Purey Khararai
- Purey Mahanth
- Purey Panday
- Purey Ram Sahaya
- Purey Saval
- Purey Shekhi
- Raghwapur
- Rahetu Rampur
- Rainipur Sakhariya
- Raipur
- Rajapur
- Rajapur Deva Patti
- Rajapur Kharhar
- Rakha
- Ram Nagar
- Ramapur
- Ramdava Patti
- Ramgarh
- Rampur Adharganj
- Rastipur
- Rasuiya
- Ratanmai
- Risal Garh
- Rohakala Khurd
- Sadhauli
- Sahajvar
- Sahpur
- Sandaura
- Sandh
- Sandila
- Sansaripur
- Sansarpur (159562)
- Sansarpur (159763)
- Sarai Bharat Rai
- Sarai Jamuni
- Sarai Raja
- Sarai Ratau
- Sarai Santram
- Sarai Sher Khan
- Sarai Sultani
- Saray Ganai
- Saray Nakar
- Sarbanka Purva
- Savaiya
- Shekhupur
- Shiv Garh
- Shivgarh
- Shivsat
- Sigahi
- Sighati Khalsa
- Silaudhi
- Sipahmaheri
- Sirnathpur
- Sripur
- Sujanpur
- Sujha
- Sultanpur
- Surva Misirpur
- Suvansa
- Tandwa
- Tardeeh
- Taroi Deeh
- Tavankalpur
- Thahipur
- Thariya
- Tikaita
- Titihiriya Dand
- Tiwaripur (159680)
- Tiwaripur (159753)
- Todar Patti
- Tulsipur
- Ugaipur
