= Kunda Assembly constituency =

Constituency of the Uttar Pradesh legislative assembly in India

Coordinates: 25.72°N 81.51°E

Kunda
- Constituency No. 29 for the Uttar Pradesh Legislative Assembly

Constituency details
- Country: India
- Region: North India
- State: Uttar Pradesh
- District: Pratapgarh
- Total electors: 3,57,938
- Reservation: None

Member of Legislative Assembly
- 18th Uttar Pradesh Legislative Assembly
- Incumbent Raghuraj Pratap Singh
- Party: JD(L)
- Alliance: None
- Elected year: 2022

Kunda is a constituency of the Uttar Pradesh Legislative Assembly covering the city of Kunda in the Pratapgarh district of Uttar Pradesh, India.

Kunda is one of five assembly constituencies in the Kaushambi Lok Sabha constituency. Since 2008, this assembly constituency is numbered 246 amongst 403 constituencies.

== Members of Legislative Assembly ==
Year	Member	Party
1952	Ram Naresh Shukla	Indian National Congress
1952	Ram Swaroop	Indian National Congress
1957	Nand Ram	Independent
1957	Gaya Prasad	Independent
1962	Niyaz Hasan Khan	Indian National Congress
1967	Niyaz Hasan Khan	Indian National Congress
1969	Jai Ram	Samyukta Socialist Party
1974	Niyaz Hasan Khan	Indian National Congress (O)
1977	Shashi Prabha	Janata Party
1980	Niyaz Hasan Khan	Indian National Congress
1985	Niyaz Hasan Khan	Indian National Congress
1989	Niyaz Hasan Khan	Indian National Congress
1991	Shiv Narayan Mishra	Bharatiya Janata Party
1993	Raghuraj Pratap Singh	Independent
1996	Raghuraj Pratap Singh	Independent
2002	Raghuraj Pratap Singh	Independent
2007	Raghuraj Pratap Singh	Independent
2012	Raghuraj Pratap Singh	Independent
2017	Raghuraj Pratap Singh	Independent
2022	Raghuraj Pratap Singh	Jansatta Dal (L)

== Election results ==
=== 2027 ===
2027 Uttar Pradesh Legislative Assembly election: Kunda
Party	Candidate	Votes	%	±%
Jansatta Dal (L)	Raghuraj Pratap Singh			
NDA				
INDIA				
NOTA	None of the above			
Majority				
Turnout				
gain from		Swing		

=== 2022 ===
U. P. Legislative Assembly Election, 2022: Kunda
Party	Candidate	Votes	%	±%
Jansatta Dal (L)	Raghuraj Pratap Singh	99,612	50.58	
SP	Gulshan Yadav	69,297	35.19	
BJP	Sindhuja Mishra	16,455	8.36	−8.03
BSP	Mohd Fahim	3,345	1.70	−6.89
BMP	Dharma Raj	1,985	1.01	−0.04
NOTA	None of the above	2,161	1.1	−0.93
Majority		30,315	15.39	−36.17
Turnout		196,940	55.02	−3.61
Jansatta Dal (L) gain from Independent		Swing		

=== 2017 ===
U. P. Legislative Assembly Election, 2017: Kunda
Party	Candidate	Votes	%	±%
Independent	Raghuraj Pratap Singh	136,597	67.95	
BJP	Janki Sharan	32,950	16.39	
BSP	Parvez Akhtar	17,261	8.59	
Independent	Bhagwandeen	5,514	2.74	
Independent	Ram Kripal	2,615	1.3	
BMP	Jiya Lal	2,109	1.05	
NOTA	None of the above	3,992	2.03	
Majority		103,647	51.56	
Turnout		201,038	58.63	
Independent hold		Swing		

=== 2012 ===
U. P. Legislative Assembly Election, 2012: Kunda
Party	Candidate	Votes	%	±%
Independent	Raghuraj Pratap Singh	1,11,392	67.96	
BSP	Shiv Prakash Mishra	23,137	14.12	
INC	Ram Shankar	14,341	8.75	
BJP	Tribhuvan	3,515	2.14	
Independent	Panna Lal	3,216	1.96	
Majority		88,255	53.84	
Turnout		1,63,912	51.96	
Independent hold		Swing		

=== 2007 ===
U. P. Legislative Assembly Election, 2007: Kunda
Party	Candidate	Votes	%	±%
Independent	Raghuraj Pratap Singh	73,732		
BSP	Shiv Prakash Mishra	20,604		
AD(K)	Thakur Prakash Singh	9,241		
INC	Kunwar Amresh Singh	5928		
Majority		53,128		
Turnout				
Independent hold		Swing		

=== 2002 ===
U. P. Legislative Assembly Election, 2002: Kunda
Party	Candidate	Votes	%	±%
Independent	Raghuraj Pratap Singh	88,446	82.13	
SP	Mohammad Sami	6,768	6.28	
BSP	Yogendra Nath Mishra Maula	3,583	3.33	
Independent	Harivansh Kumar	2,213	2.06	
INC	Shiv Baran Singh	1,823	1.69	
Majority		81,678	75.85	
Turnout		1,07,687	44.92	
Independent hold		Swing		
