= Shiv Pal Singh Patel =

Indian politician

Member of Parliament, Lok Sabha
- Incumbent
- Assumed office 4 June 2024
- Preceded by: Sangam Lal Gupta
- Constituency: Pratapgarh

Personal details
- Born: sadarpur, madhoganj distt.-hardoi UP
- Party: Samajwadi Party
- Occupation: Politician, teacher Business

Shiv Pal Singh Patel is an Indian politician from Uttar Pradesh. Shiv Pal Singh was elected as a member of parliament from Pratapgarh on 4 June 2024.
