= Raniganj Assembly constituency =

Raniganj Assembly constituency may refer to:

- Raniganj, Bihar Assembly constituency
- Raniganj, Uttar Pradesh Assembly constituency
- Raniganj, West Bengal Assembly constituency
