= S. P. Singh Patel =

Indian politician

Member of Parliament, Lok Sabha
- Incumbent
- Assumed office 4 June 2024
- Preceded by: Sangam Lal Gupta
- Constituency: Pratapgarh

Member of Uttar Pradesh legislative council
- In office 5 May 2002 – 4 May 2014
- Constituency: Lucknow Graduate

Personal details
- Born: 1 January 1956 (age 70) Sadarpur, Hardoi district, Uttar Pradesh
- Party: Samajwadi Party
- Spouse: Kanti Singh
- Education: University of Allahabad

S. P. Singh Patel (born 1 January 1956) is an Indian educationist, social worker and politician. He is the founder and chairman of the Lucknow Public Schools and Colleges, a chain of educational institutions in north India. He is also a member of the Samajwadi Party (SP) and was a member of the Uttar Pradesh Legislative Council from 2002 to 2014, elected twice in 2002 and 2008 from the Lucknow Graduates constituency. He is the general secretary of SP's teachers cell.

== Early life and education ==
Patel was born in Sadarpur, Hardoi on 1 January 1956. He completed B.Com., M.Com. and PhD from the Allahabad University. He also has a Masters in Economics, an MBA, a B.Ed. and post graduate degree in botany, among other qualifications.

== Career in education ==
Patel established the first Lucknow Public School in 1983. It has since expanded and has schools and colleges in Vinamra Khand, Gomti Nagar, Lucknow, A-Block, Rajajipuram, Lucknow, B-Block, Rajajipuram, Lucknow, Sahara States, Jankipuram, Lucknow, Sec-9, Vrindavan Yojna, Lucknow, Sec-E, Amrapali Yojna, Lucknow, Anand Nagar, Lucknow, Garden City, DLF, Lucknow, Aseni Mod, Barabanki, Madhoganj, Hardoi, Naveen Chowk, Sitapur, LRP Chauraha, Lakhimpur and Sangam Vihar, New Delhi. He has also been a lecturer in commerce at the KP Jaiswal Inter College, Mutthiganj. He has occasionally led various movements for filling vacancies and pending appointment of teachers, and is well known in Uttar Pradesh as an educationist.

== Political career ==
Patel has been a member of the Uttar Pradesh Legislative Council for two full terms adding up to 12 years from 2002 to 2014. He was first elected on 5 May 2002 from the Lucknow Graduates constituency of the Uttar Pradesh Legislative Council and re-elected from the same on 5 May 2008. He started full time participation in party work from 2015 on. He helped in the campaign of Man Singh and was fielded as a candidate in the MLC elections for teachers constituencies from Allahabad–Jhansi in February 2022 but lost by a slim margin to Babu Lal Tiwari of the Bharatiya Janata Party. In the 2024 Indian general election, he has been fielded as a candidate from Pratapgarh.

== Personal life ==
Patel is married to Kanti Singh, who is also a member of the Samajwadi Party and has also been a member of the Uttar Pradesh Legislative Council from the same Lucknow Graduates constituency from 2014 to 2020.

In 2006, S.P. Singh Patel was charged with the murder of another school owner named C.P. Singh alongwith co-conspirator Shiv Bahadur. Two shooters were hired by Patel and Bahadur.

S.P. Singh Patel was arrested on December 2006. In 2014, was released from jail having served 8 years. Alongwith him, three of his associates were also acquitted due to lack of evidence.
