= Rai Sarabjit Singh =

- Ruler of Bhadri
- Reign: 15 February 1878-1910
- Predecessor: Rai Jagat Bahadur Singh
- Successor: Rai Krishna Pratap Singh
- Born: 10 December 1853
- Died: before 1910
- House: Bisen
- Religion: Hinduism

Rai Sarabjit Singh (1853–1910) was the ruler of Bhadri (estate) of Oudh, belongs from Bisen family, succeeded on 15 February 1878 after the death of the late Rai Jagat Bahadur Singh. He received the hereditary title of Rai from the British government in November 1879. His property was taken under the management of the Court of Wards in 1867, on account of minority and indebtedness of the owner, and released in 1878. The Bhadri taluqa was well managed by Sarabjit Singh, who left it practically unencumbered. Later estate was ruled by Rai Krishna Pratap Singh.

== See also ==
- Pratapgarh Estate
- Bhadri
