= Fatanpur, Uttar Pradesh =

Fatanpur is a small village situated in the Gaura block, Raniganj tehsil, Pratapgarh district, Uttar Pradesh, India.

== Location ==
It is 30 km east from Pratapgarh by road and 45 km north-east from Allahabad by air distance. It is at 25° 44' 02.89" N, 82° 07'27.51"E. Fatanpur is located on the Lacknow-Varansi 36 nu. Highway.

== Facilities ==
Fatanpur has a government primary school and government middle school.

== Economy ==
Most people of the village depend on farming.

== Temples ==
Budiya Mayi is famous temple of the village.
