= Sagra Sunderpur =

- Village
- Nickname: Manish Jaiswal
- Country: India
- State: Uttar Pradesh

Government
  - Body: Gram Panchayat

Languages
  - Official: Hindi
- Time zone: UTC+5:30 (IST)
- Postal code: 230136

Sagra Sundarpur is one of the villages in Lakshamanpur Mandal, Pratapgarh District, Uttar Pradesh State.
