= Chhatar Singh Deo =

Maharaja of Samthar from 1865–1896

HH Maharaja Chhatar Singh Deo Bahadur (8 October 1843 – 16 June 1896) was a ruler of Samthar State from 3 February 1865 till his death on 16 June 1896. His son Bir Singh Judeo succeeded the throne on his death.
