= Pratapgarh Lok Sabha constituency =

Constituency of the Indian parliament in Uttar Pradesh

Coordinates: 25.89°N 91.94°E

Pratapgarh UP-39
- Lok Sabha constituency
- Interactive Map Outlining Pratapgarh Lok Sabha constituency

Constituency details
- Country: India
- Region: North India
- State: Uttar Pradesh
- Assembly constituencies: Rampur Khas; Vishwanathganj; Pratapgarh; Patti; Raniganj
- Established: 1952
- Reservation: None

Member of Parliament
- 18th Lok Sabha
- Incumbent S. P. Singh Patel
- Party: Samajwadi Party
- Elected year: 2024

Pratapgarh Lok Sabha constituency is one of the 80 Lok Sabha parliamentary constituencies in the state of Uttar Pradesh.

== Assembly segments ==
Presently, Pratapgarh Lok Sabha constituency comprises five Vidhan Sabha (legislative assembly) segments. They are:

No	Name	District	Member	Party	2024 Lead
244	Rampur Khas	Pratapgarh	Aradhana Misra	INC	SP
247	Vishwanathganj	Pratapgarh	Jeet Lal Patel	AD(S)	BJP
248	Pratapgarh	Pratapgarh	Rajendra Kumar Maurya	BJP	SP
249	Patti	Pratapgarh	Ram Singh Patel	SP	SP
250	Raniganj	Pratapgarh	Rakesh Kumar Verma	SP	SP

== Members of Parliament ==
Year	Member	Party
1952	Munishwar Datt Upadhyay	Indian National Congress
1957	Munishwar Datt Upadhyay	Indian National Congress
1962	Ajit Pratap Singh	Bharatiya Jana Sangh
1967	Dinesh Singh	Indian National Congress
1971	Dinesh Singh	Indian National Congress
1977	Roop Nath Singh Yadav	Janata Party
1980	Ajit Pratap Singh	Indian National Congress
1984	Dinesh Singh	Indian National Congress
1989	Dinesh Singh	Indian National Congress
1991	Abhay Pratap Singh	Janata Dal
1996	Rajkumari Ratna Singh	Indian National Congress
1998	Ram Vilas Vedanti	Bharatiya Janata Party
1999	Rajkumari Ratna Singh	Indian National Congress
2004	Akshay Pratap Singh	Samajwadi Party
2009	Rajkumari Ratna Singh	Indian National Congress
2014	Harivansh Singh	Apna Dal
2019	Sangam Lal Gupta	Bharatiya Janata Party
2024	S. P. Singh Patel	Samajwadi Party

== Election results ==
=== 2024 ===
2024 Indian general elections:Pratapgarh
Party	Candidate	Votes	%	±%
SP	S. P. Singh Patel	441,932	46.65	▲46.65
BJP	Sangam Lal Gupta	3,75,726	39.66	▼08.04
BSP	Prathmesh Mishra	80,144	8.46	▼26.37
NOTA	None of the Above	2,891	0.31	▼1.02
Majority		66,206	6.99	▼12.56
Turnout		9,47,288	51.67	▼1.89
SP gain from BJP		Swing		

=== 2019 ===
2019 Indian general elections: Pratapgarh
Party	Candidate	Votes	%	±%
BJP	Sangam Lal Gupta	436,291	47.70	
BSP	Ashok Kumar Tripathi	3,18,539	34.83	
INC	Rajkumari Ratna Singh	77,096	8.43	
Jansatta Dal (L)	Akshay Pratap Singh	46,963	5.13	
NOTA	None of the Above	12,159	1.33	
Majority		1,17,752	12.87	
Turnout		9,15,259	53.56	
BJP gain from AD(K)		Swing		

=== 2014 ===
2014 Indian general elections: Pratapgarh
Party	Candidate	Votes	%	±%
AD(K)	Kunwar Harivansh Singh	375,789	42.01	+25.13
BSP	Asif Nizamuddin Siddique	2,07,567	23.20	+1.46
INC	Rajkumari Ratna Singh	1,38,620	15.50	−10.89
SP	Pramod Kumar Singh Patel	1,20,107	13.43	−5.49
AAP	Ashok Shukla (Senani)	9,983	1.12	+1.12
NOTA	None of the Above	9,098	1.02	+1.02
Margin of victory		1,68,222	18.81	+14.16
Turnout		8,94,456	52.12	+7.46
AD(K) gain from INC		Swing	+15.62	

=== 2009 ===
2009 Indian general elections: Pratapgarh
Party	Candidate	Votes	%	±%
INC	Rajkumari Ratna Singh	169,137	26.39	
BSP	Prof. Shivakant Ojha	1,39,358	21.74	
SP	Kunwar Akshaya Pratap Singh	1,21,252	18.92	
AD(K)	Atiq Ahmed	1,08,211	16.88	
BJP	Lakshmi Narain Pandey	45,575	7.11	
Margin of victory		29,779	4.65	
Turnout		6,41,003	44.66	
INC gain from SP		Swing		
