= Daljit =

Daljit is a given name. Notable people with the name include:

- Daljit Ami, Punjabi documentary filmmaker and journalist
- Daljit Singh Cheema (born 1962), Indian politician from the state of Punjab
- Daljit Dhaliwal (born 1962), British newsreader and television presenter
- Daljit Singh Grewal, Indian politician
- Daljit Kaur (born 1982), Indian television actress
- Daljit Nagra MBE FRSL (born 1966), British poet
- Daljit Shah, a Prince of the Gorkha Kingdom
- Daljit Singh Shergill (died 2014), Sikh leader from Punjab, India, president of the first gurdwara in the UK
- Daljit Singh (cricketer, born 1935) (1935–2009), Indian cricketer
- Daljit Singh (cricketer, born 1937) (born 1937), Indian cricketer
- Daljit Singh (cricketer, born 1940s) (born 1940), Indian first-class cricketer and pitch curator
- Daljit Singh (Delhi politician), Indian politician and freedom fighter
- Daljit Singh (footballer) (born 1976), Indian football player
- Daljit Singh (ophthalmologist) (1934–2017), Indian ophthalmologist
- Daljit Singh (politician, born 1882) (1882–1946), Indian politician born in Kapurthala
- Rai Daljit Singh (around 1798), Ruler of Bhadri (estate)
