= Nagendra Singh Yadav =

Indian politician

Nagendra Singh Munna Yadav

MLA
- Constituency: Sadar Assembly Constituency Pratapgarh

Personal details
- Born: 22 November 1961 (age 64) Chaukhad, Pratapgarh, Uttar Pradesh
- Party: Samajwadi Party
- As of 30 December, 2012

Nagendra Singh Yadav (born 22 November 1961) also known as Munna Yadav is an Indian politician.He served as the Member of Legislative Assembly (MLA) from Samajwadi Party and represented Sadar Vidhan Sabha Assembly Constituency of Pratapgarh district in Uttar Pradesh.

== Early life ==
Nagendra Singh alias Munna Yadav was born to father Late Bhishmdev Yadav and mother Kamla Devi a Hindu Ahir (Yadav) family of Uttar Pradesh. He completed graduation in Law from the University of Allahabad in 1982. Nagendra is a professional lawyer who has been elected in Uttar Pradesh Assembly Election 2012 from Pratapgarh constituency.

== Career ==
Nagendra Singh Yadav started his political career as independent member of legislative assembly in the assembly election 2007 in Pratapgarh Vidhan Sabha constituency and secured 6000 votes. In 2012 from the ticket of Samajwadi Party Yadav won the assembly election against Bahujan Samajwadi Party's candidate Sanjay by margin of 7510 votes in Pratapgarh constituency Uttar Pradesh Assembly Election.

== See also ==
- Pratapgarh (Lok Sabha constituency)
- Sadar
- 2007 Uttar Pradesh assembly elections
