= Harivansh Singh =

Indian politician

Member of Parliament, Lok Sabha
- In office 1 September 2014 – 23 May 2019
- Preceded by: Ratna Singh
- Succeeded by: Sangam Lal Gupta
- Constituency: Pratapgarh

Personal details
- Born: 4 September 1950 (age 76) Jaunpur, Uttar Pradesh, India
- Party: Apna Dal
- Spouse: Late Smt. Indrawati Singh
- Children: 2
- Education: University of Gorakhpur
- Occupation: Builder
- As of 17 December, 2016

Harivansh Singh is an Indian politician and a member of the Apna Dal; and has won the 2014 Indian general elections from the Pratapgarh (Lok Sabha constituency).

== Early life and education ==
He hails from Jaunpur, Uttar Pradesh. He has a B.Sc. from T.D. College, Jaunpur, Gorakhpur University, Gorakhpur. He married Indravati Singh on 20 March 1962.

== Career ==
He is a business man from Mumbai. Kunwar Haribansh Singh was elected to 16th Lok Sabha of Indian Parliament on 16 May 2014 from Pratapgarh (Lok Sabha constituency), Uttar Pradesh.
