= Bhadri (estate) =

Taluqdari estate in Oudh

Bhadri Estate
- ?–1947
- Status: Taluqdari estate
- Capital: Bhadri
- Common languages: Awadhi, Hindi
- Religion: Hinduism
- Government: Monarchy
- Rai
  - ?: Rai Sabal Shah (first)
  - 1926–1947: Rai Bajrang Bahadur Singh (last)
- Historical era: Early modern period
  - Established: ?
  - Acceded to India: 1947
Preceded by	Succeeded by
Kalakankar	Dominion of India
- Today part of: Uttar Pradesh, Republic of India

Bhadri was an estate (taluqdari) of Oudh, British India. The Taluqdari was controlled by the Bisen clan of Rajputs. Now it is part of Pratapgarh district in Uttar Pradesh, India.

== History ==
During the time of Oudh Government, Bhadri was scene of numerous of fights, the chief of which occurred in 1798 Fasli between Mirza Jan, the Nazim and the Taluqdar Rai Daljit Singh. The Nazim who had encamped in Bhadri, demanded a higher revenue from the Taluqdar, and in the dispute which followed taluqdar lost his life. After the Battle of Manikpore (now known as Manikpur in Pratapgarh district of Uttar Pradesh), in 1748, they made their peace with the Delhi authorities through the intervention of a Ddroga of artillery; and Jit Singh, the chief of Bhadri, attended a Darbar and obtained title of Rai. In 1798 the Nazim Mirza Jan visited Bhadri; he questioned the Rai Daljit Singh about his revenue, with a view to revision, and a quarrel ensued, in which the Rai Daljit Singh was killed. His son, Rai Zalim Singh, was thrown into prison in 1810 at Lucknow for non payment of the revenue and the property was taken under direct management.

While husband was in prison, His wife, Sheoraj Kunwar, visited Bhadri under pretext of performing some religious rites and there she assembled the clan and boldly collected the rents. She was besieged by the Chakladar, Jagat Kishor in the fort at Bhadri for eight days until orders came from Lucknow to stop attack and the courageous lady was permitted to occupy the castle. In 1815 the Rai was released and recovered the estate.

Again in 1833 the Nazim Ehsan Husain, who is said to have had with him 50,000 men, besieged Rai Jagmohan Singh in Bhadri, on account of refusing to pay revenue. The Bhadri fort was unsuccessfully attacked for twelve days, when a compromise was effected. In the following year the Nazim continued his exactions, and extended them to the other Bisen Rajput Taluqdars, among them was Raja Hanumant Singh of Kalakankar-Dharupur. A fight ensured at the place and the Nazim was defeated with the loss of two guns. He again attacked the Bisens at Benti with a similar result; but nothing daunted. He assembled a larger force and besieged Bhadri for second time. There upon Rai Jagmohan Singh and his son Bishnath Singh fled across the border to British territory. At Ramchaura Ghat on the bank of Ganges, they were surprised and killed by the Nazim and slain was subsequently removed from office because of this great offence and violation of British territory. Taluqdars however remained loyal to British.

The fort of Bhadri was leveled in 1858 by order of government; its ruins are still to be seen, covered with picturesque clumps of bamboos.

Bhadri was then given to Amarnath Singh, nephew and adopted son of Rai Jagmohan Singh, who was succeeded by his adopted son, Rai Jagat Bahadur Singh, whose father Sheoratan Singh, was killed at Allahabad. Rai Jagat Bahadur Singh also died without issue, and adopted Rai Sarabjit Singh, who received the hereditary title of Rai from the British government in November 1879. His property was taken under the management of the Court of Wards in 1867, on account of minority and indebtedness of the owner, and released in 1878. The Bhadri taluqa was well managed by Rai Sarabjit Singh, who left it practically unencumbered. Later estate was ruled by Rai Krishna Pratap Singh, who was succeeded by Rai Bajrang Bahadur Singh around 1926/1930. After Independence of India on 15 August 1947, the Bhadri (Taluq) estate was merged in Republic of India. Rai Bajrang Bahadur Singh (1906–1973), the last ruler of Bhadri, served as Lieutenant Governor of Himachal Pradesh from 1 January 1955 to 13 August 1963. Rai Bajrang Bahadur Singh had no heir, after his death in 1973, his nephew Rai Uday Pratap Singh proceeded as incumbent titular of Bhadri.

Bhadri Estate, also known as Bhadri Raj, is a historically significant zamindari estate located in the region of present-day Uttar Pradesh, India. It holds an important place in the socio-political and cultural history of North India, particularly in the Awadh (Oudh) region. The estate was ruled by a lineage of powerful landholders, often associated with Rajput heritage, who played crucial roles during different phases of Indian history—from the Mughal era to British colonial rule and even during India’s struggle for independence.

The estate included numerous villages, agricultural lands, and administrative centers. Its location allowed it to maintain strong trade connections and sustain a large population dependent on farming and allied activities.

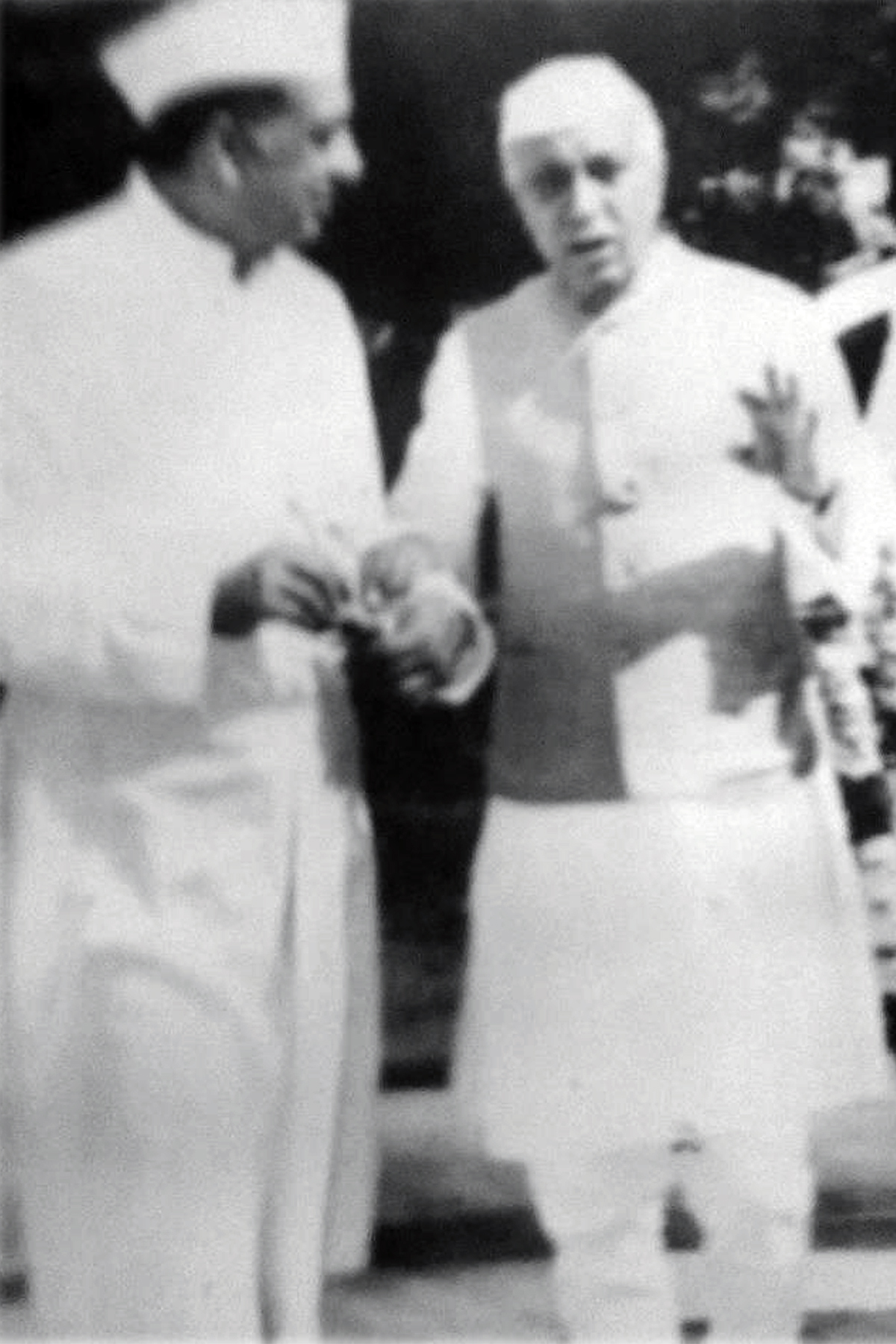
Rai Bajrang Bahadur Singh (1906–1973), with Prime Minister Pt. Jawaharlal Nehru.

== List of rulers ==
The rulers of Bhadri bore the title of Rai. The list of rulers is following as:

- Rai Sabal Shah
- Rai Bikram Shah
- Rai Chhatar Singh
- Rai Ram Singh
- Rai Gaharwar Singh
- Rai Jit Singh fl.1748
- Rai Daljit Singh fl.1798
- Rai Zalim Singh, around 1810
- Rai Jagmohan Singh fl.1833
- Rai Amarnath Singh
- Rai Jagat Bahadur Singh, d.1878
- Rai Sarabjit Singh, b.10 December 1853- died before 1910
- Rai Krishna Pratap Singh, died around 1926/1930
- Rai Bajrang Bahadur Singh, b.1905, d.1973 (reign till 1947)
- Rai Uday Pratap Singh (1973–Present)

== Notable descendants ==
- Rai Bajrang Bahadur Singh (1906–1973), was a Freedom fighter, 2nd Lieutenant Governor of Himachal Pradesh, Vice Chancellor of Govind Ballabh Pant Nagar University of Agriculture and Technology, founder of Hind Flying Club.
- Rai Uday Pratap Singh (1933), Hindu leader associated with RSS & VHP, Chief patron of Trilochan Pratap Singh Baugh Evam Paryavaran Sanrakshan Samiti.
- Raghuraj Pratap Singh alias Raja Bhaiya (1968), Incumbent MLA from Kunda, Cabinet Minister for several times.

== See also ==
- Bhadri
- Pratapgarh Estate
- Amethi Estate
