= Sadar, Uttar Pradesh =

Sadar, Uttar Pradesh Sadar
- city
- Location in Uttar Pradesh, India Sadar, Uttar Pradesh (India)
- Coordinates: 25.89761°N 81.93326°E
- Country: India
- State: Uttar Pradesh
- District: Pratapgarh

Languages
  - Official: HindiAwadhi
- Time zone: UTC+5:30 (IST)
- Vehicle registration: UP
- Website: up.gov.in

Sadar is a town and a tehsil in Pratapgarh district in the Indian state of Uttar Pradesh.
