= Samthar State =

Indian princely state

Coordinates: 25°51′N 78°55′E

- Princely state of British India
- 1760–1947
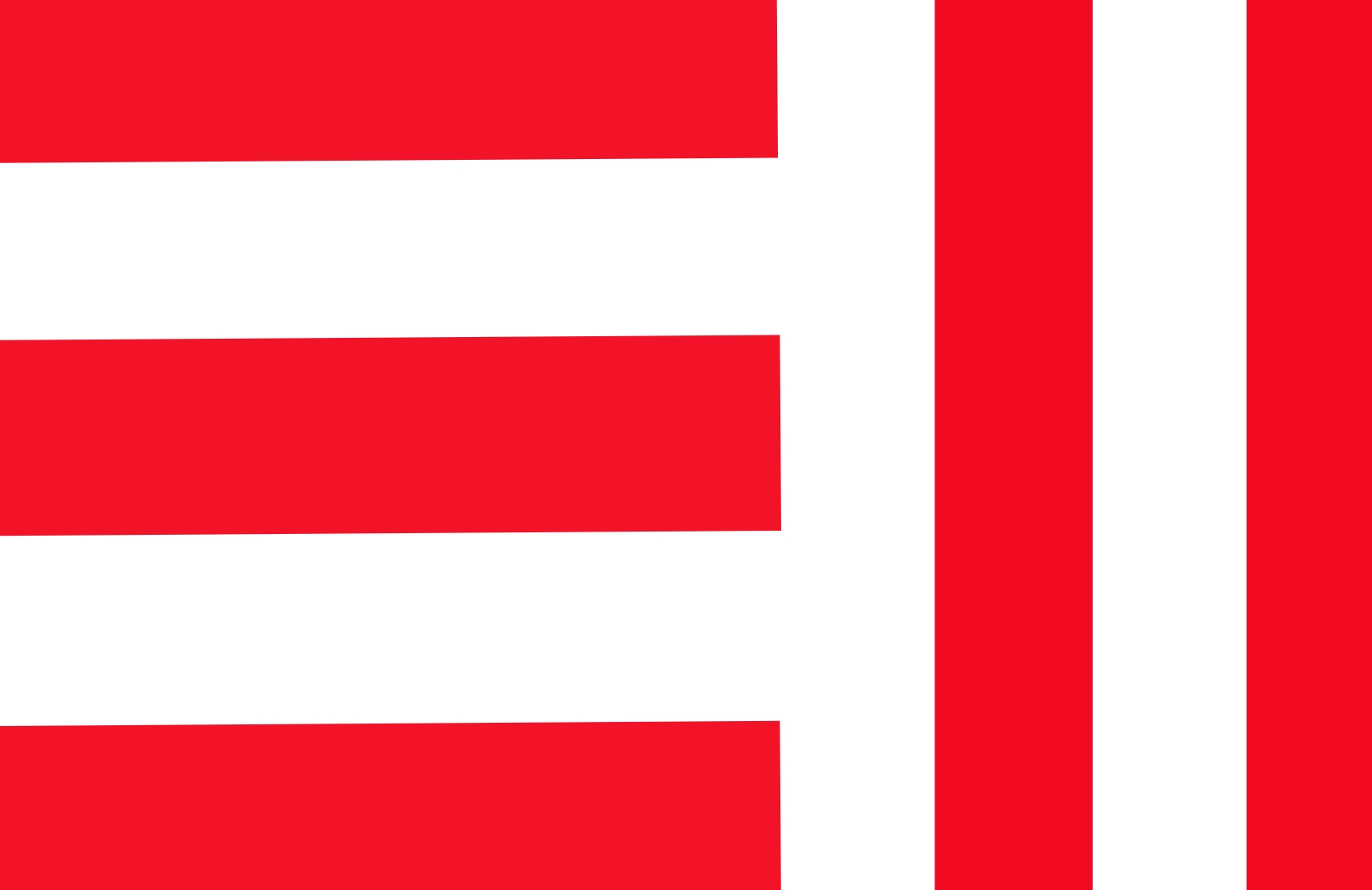
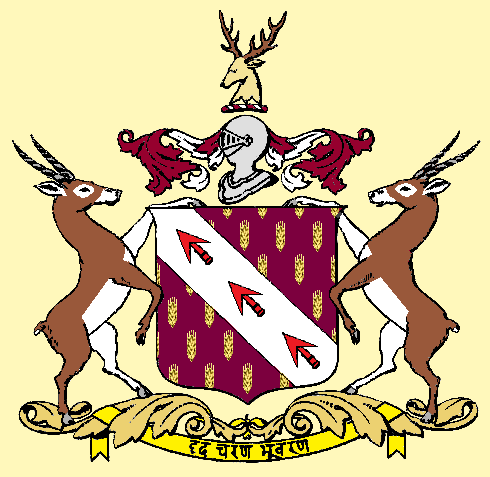
- Flag Coat of arms
- Capital: Samthar
- Area
  - 1901: 461 km^{2} (178 sq mi)
- Population
  - 1901: 33,472
- History
  - Established: 1760
  - Accession to the Union of India: 1947
| Preceded by | Succeeded by |
| Maratha Empire | India |

Samthar State was a 11 gun salute princely state in India during the British Raj. The state was administered as part of the Bundelkhand Agency of Central India. Its capital was Samthar town, located in a level plain in the Bundelkhand region crossed by the Pahuj and the Betwa rivers. The Samthar State was ruled by Bargujar Rajput clan.

The founder was Ranjith Singh who in 1760, profiting from the troubled times of the Maratha invasion, proclaimed his state independent and was acknowledged as a Raja by the Marathas. In 1817 Samthar was recognized as a state by the British. They received a sanad of adoption in 1862. In 1884 the state had to cede some territories for the construction of the railways. In 1947 it signed Instrument of Accession merging into Union of India in August 1947.

Samthar Fort once the center of governance is still being used as residence by royal family.

== Rajas ==
- 1817 – 1827 Ranjit Singh II (d. 1827)
- 1827 – 1864 Hindupat Singh (b. 1823 – d. 1890)
- 1858 – 3 Feb 1865 Rani .... (f) -Regent
- 3 Feb 1865 – 1877 Chhatar Singh (b. 1843 – d. 1896)

== Maharajas ==
- 1877 – 16 Jun 1896 Chhatar Singh Deo (s.a.)
- 17 Jun 1896 – 9 Oct 1935 Bir Singh (b. 1864 – d. 1936) (from 3 Jun 1915, Sir Bir Singh)
- 9 Oct 1935 – 1950 Radha Charan Singh (b. 1914 – d. 1972)
- 1972 – Present Ranjeet Singh Judeo Titular

== See also ==
- Jhansi District
