= Ranjeet Singh Judeo =

Indian politician (died 2023)

Member of the Uttar Pradesh Legislative Assembly
- Constituency: Garautha

Personal details
- Born: 1942/1943
- Died: 8 March 2023 (aged 80)
- Party: Indian National Congress
- Spouse: Ganga Rajya Laxmi
- Children: Niharika Raje
- Parent: Radha Charan Singh (father)
- Occupation: Politician

Ranjeet Singh Judeo (1942/1943 – 8 March 2023) was an Indian politician. Judeo was a member of the Indian National Congress and had been elected from the Garautha Assembly constituency in the state of Uttar Pradesh. He was a six-term Member of the Uttar Pradesh Legislative Assembly and also served as a Member of the Uttar Pradesh Legislative Council.

Judeo was the son of Maharaja Radha Charan Singh, the last ruler of Samthar, a princely state in the British Raj. Judeo's wife was Ganga Rajya Laxmi, was from the former Rana dynasty of Nepal. Their daughter, Niharika Raje, married Dushyant Singh, a politician and the son of Vasundhara Raje Scindia and Hemant Singh. Judeo was the maternal uncle of politician Raghuraj Pratap Singh.
