= Harshpur =

Village in Uttar Pradesh, India

Harshpur (also pronounced Harakhpur) is a village in Pratapgarh District in the Indian state of Uttar Pradesh.

== Demographics ==
As of the 2011 census, 2,057 people and 301 households resided in the village. 28% of residents were members of kshatriyas, a scheduled caste. The village is dominated by somvanshi kshatriyas or Thakur.

76.3% of residents were literate and 29% were employed. People from Harshpur hold high positions in military, law, engineering, healthcare and education.

13.1% of residents were under age 7. The gender makeup of the city was 45.5% male and 54.5% female.

== Economy ==
The economy of Harshpur mostly depends on agriculture, producing crops year round.

== Facilities and services ==
A primary school in the village provides education to impoverished and lower caste children.

The nearest connecting railway station is Bishnathganj, also known as Vishwanath Ganj, which is approximately 9 km away.

The Mandhata police station serves the village and is about 1.25 km away.

== Culture ==
Residents celebrate several festivals including Holi, Vijayadashami, Diwali, Navaratri and Maha Shivaratri.
