= Jumai Khan Azad =

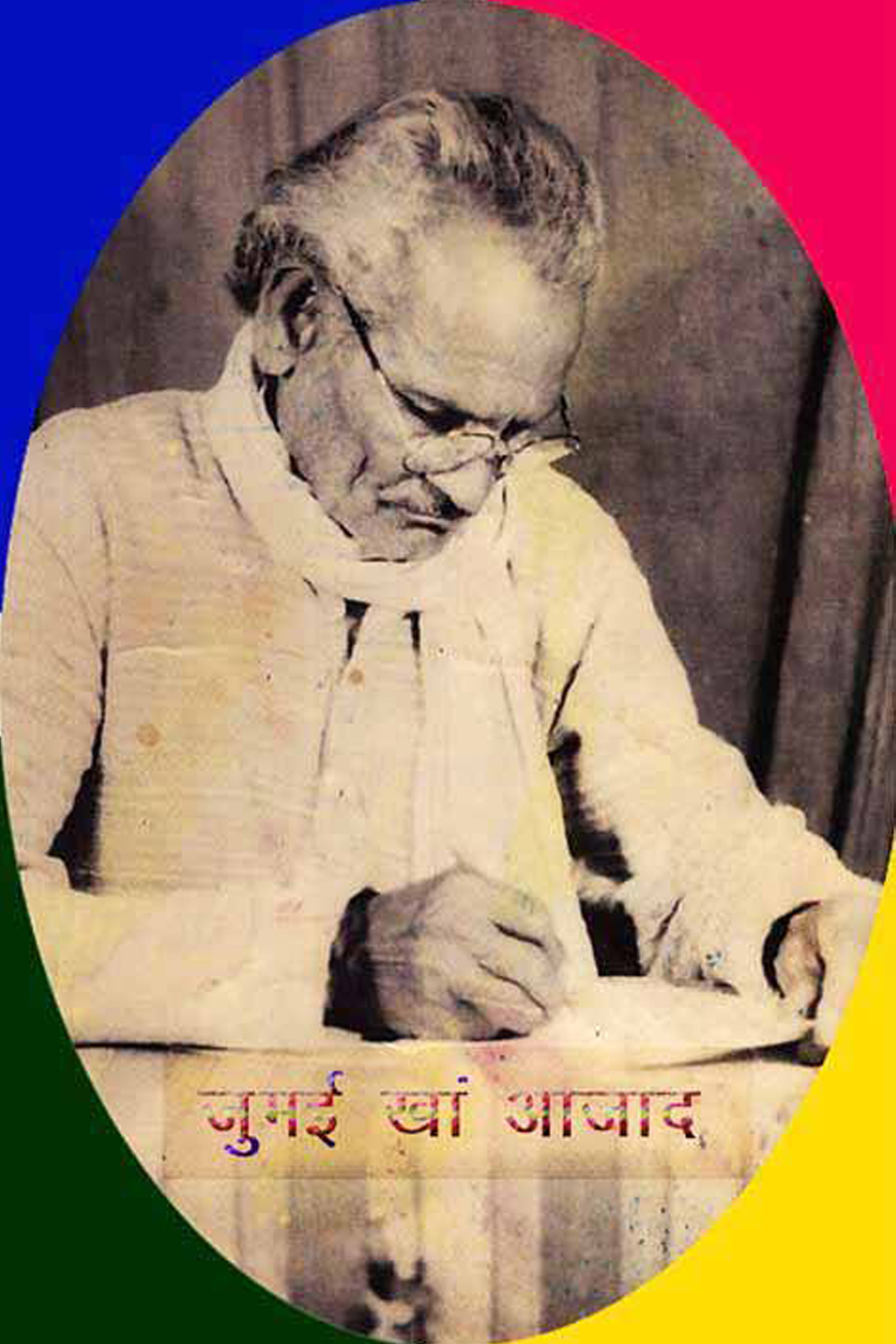
- Jumai Khan Azad
- Born: Jumai Khan Azad; 5 August 1930; Pratapgarh, British Raj
- Died: 29 December 2013 (aged 83); Gobri village, Pratapgarh, India
- Occupation: Poet
- Known for: Poetry in Awadhi language

Jumai Khan Azad (5 August 1930 – 29 December 2013) was an Indian poet of Awadhi language from Pratapgarh, Uttar Pradesh, India. He received the Awadhi Academy Award and Lokabandhu Rajnarayan Memorial Award.

== Biography ==
Azad was born in Gobri village in Pratapgarh in Uttar Pradesh to father Siddiqui Ahmed and mother Hameeda Bano.

Azad published 21 books of poetry.

He died on 29 December 2013.

== See also ==
- List of Indian poets
- List of people from Pratapgarh
- List of Awadhi-language poets
