= Raja Pratap Bahadur Singh =

- Raja Bahadur; Ruler of Pratapgarh Estate
- Reign: 1889–1921
- Predecessor: Raja Ajit Singh
- Successor: Raja Ajit Pratap Singh
- Died: 1921
- Issue: Raja Ajit Pratap Singh; Rani Padmavati Devi
- House: Somvanshi
- Father: Raja Ajit Singh
- Religion: Hinduism

Raja Pratap Bahadur Singh (1889–1921) was taluqdar of Pratapgarh Estate of Oudh, British India. He came from a Somvanshi Rajput family. He was Vice President of British Indian Association from 1911 to till 1918. Singh also represented as President of Akhil Bharatiya Kshatriya Mahasabha in 1907.

== See also ==
- Pratapgarh Estate
