= Sarbjit Dusang =

Canadian field hockey player

Sarbjit Singh Dusang (born 6 September 1952 in Powadra, Punjab, India) is an Indian-born Canadian former field hockey player who competed in the 1976 Summer Olympics.
