= Rajendra Kumar Maurya =

Indian politician

Member of the Uttar Pradesh Legislative Assembly
- Incumbent
- Assumed office 2022
- Preceded by: Rajkumar Pal
- Constituency: Pratapgarh

Personal details
- Born: January 20, 1968 (age 57); Chilbila, Pratapgarh, Uttar Pradesh
- Political party: Bhartiya Janata Party
- Education: Bachelor of Arts (Awadh University)

Rajendra Kumar Maurya (born 20 January 1968) is an Indian politician from Uttar Pradesh. He is a member of Uttar Pradesh Legislative Assembly from Pratapgarh Assembly constituency in Pratapgarh district. He won the 2022 Uttar Pradesh Legislative Assembly election, as a candidate of Bhartiya Janata Party.

== Early life and education ==
Maurya is born in Chilbila, Pratapgarh, Uttar Pradesh. He belongs to Murai caste. He is the son of late Ram Narayan Maurya. He completed his BA in 1987 at Awadh University, Faizabad.

== Career ==
Maurya won from Pratapgarh Assembly constituency representing Bharatiya Janata Party in the 2022 Uttar Pradesh Legislative Assembly election. He polled 89,762 votes and defeated his nearest rival, Krishna Patel of Apna Dal (Kamerawadi), by a margin of 25,063 votes.
