= Rajkumar Pal =

Indian politician

- Constituency: Sadar

MLA of Pratapgarh
- In office 24 October 2019 – Mla sadar pratapgarh
- Preceded by: Sangam Lal Gupta

Personal details
- Born: Pratapgarh Pratapgarh
- Party: Apna Dal (Sonelal)
- Children: En .Kundan Pal

Rajkumar Pal is an Indian politician from Uttar Pradesh in the Apna Dal (Sonelal) party. He was elected as a member of the Uttar Pradesh Legislative Assembly from Pratapgarh on 24 October 2019. Now he is state president of Apna dal s. Rajkumar Pal belongs to a farmer family. After a long struggle finally he became MLA of Sadar constituency in by-election 2019.

The National president of Apna dal S and state union minister Smt Anupriya Patel faithing upon him decided to make him state president of Ads in May 2022.
