= Roop Nath Singh Yadav =

Indian politician

Member of parliament, Lok Sabha
- In office 1977–1980
- Preceded by: Dinesh Singh
- Succeeded by: Ajit Pratap Singh
- Constituency: Pratapgarh

Personal details
- Died: 13 February 2001
- Party: Janata Party
- As of 22 December, 2012

Roop Nath Singh Yadav (Hindi:रूप नाथ सिंह यादव) was an Indian politician and Member of Parliament of 6th Lok Sabha, belongs to Janata Party representing Pratapgarh Parliamentary Constituency of Uttar Pradesh. He was a veteran freedom fighter who took an active part in the Quit Indian independence movement and was imprisoned.

== Life ==
Roop Nath Singh Yadav left practice of Law after he was elected to the legislative assembly of Uttar Pradesh and inducted in the council of minister headed by Late Chaudhary Charan Singh and was a member of legislative assembly for two terms and a member of Lok Sabha for one term. Roop Nath Singh Yadav, Member of Parliament (6th Lok Sabha) in which capacity he moved the private member Bill. The Indian Social Disparity Removal Bill, 1979 The discussion on the Bill in the House led to Constitution of the All India Backward Class Commission headed by Late B.P. Mandal of which Roop Nath Singh Yadav was a co-opted Member for Uttar Pradesh. Joined Indian National Congress (I) in 1985–86 in presence of the then Prime Minister of India, Rajiv Gandhi and was DCC Chief Allahabad. His younger brother Babu Athairam Yadav was also elected three times as member of legislative assembly from Handiya Allahabad constituency.

== Political career ==
Roop Nath Singh Yadav was a member of Sixth Lok Sabha from 1977 to 1979 representing Pratapgarh Parliamentary Constituency of Uttar Pradesh. Earlier, Shri Yadav was a member of Uttar Pradesh Legislative Assembly and served his State as Deputy Minister for Agriculture and Cabinet Minister for Local Self Government during 1967–70.

An active parliamentarian, Yadav was a member of Committee on Absence of Members from the Sittings of the House and Joint Committee on Salaries and Allowances of Members of Parliament.

A veteran freedom fighter, Yadav took part in the Quit India Movement and suffered imprisonment. A keen social and political worker, Shri Yadav worked relentlessly for the uplift of the downtrodden and weaker sections of the society. Roop Nath Singh Yadav died on 13 February 2001 at Allahabad, Uttar Pradesh at the age of 83.

== See also ==
- Pratapgarh (Lok Sabha constituency)
- 12th Lok Sabha
- Member of Parliament
- Pratapgarh, Uttar Pradesh
