= List of Awadhi-language poets =

This is a List of Awadhi language poets.

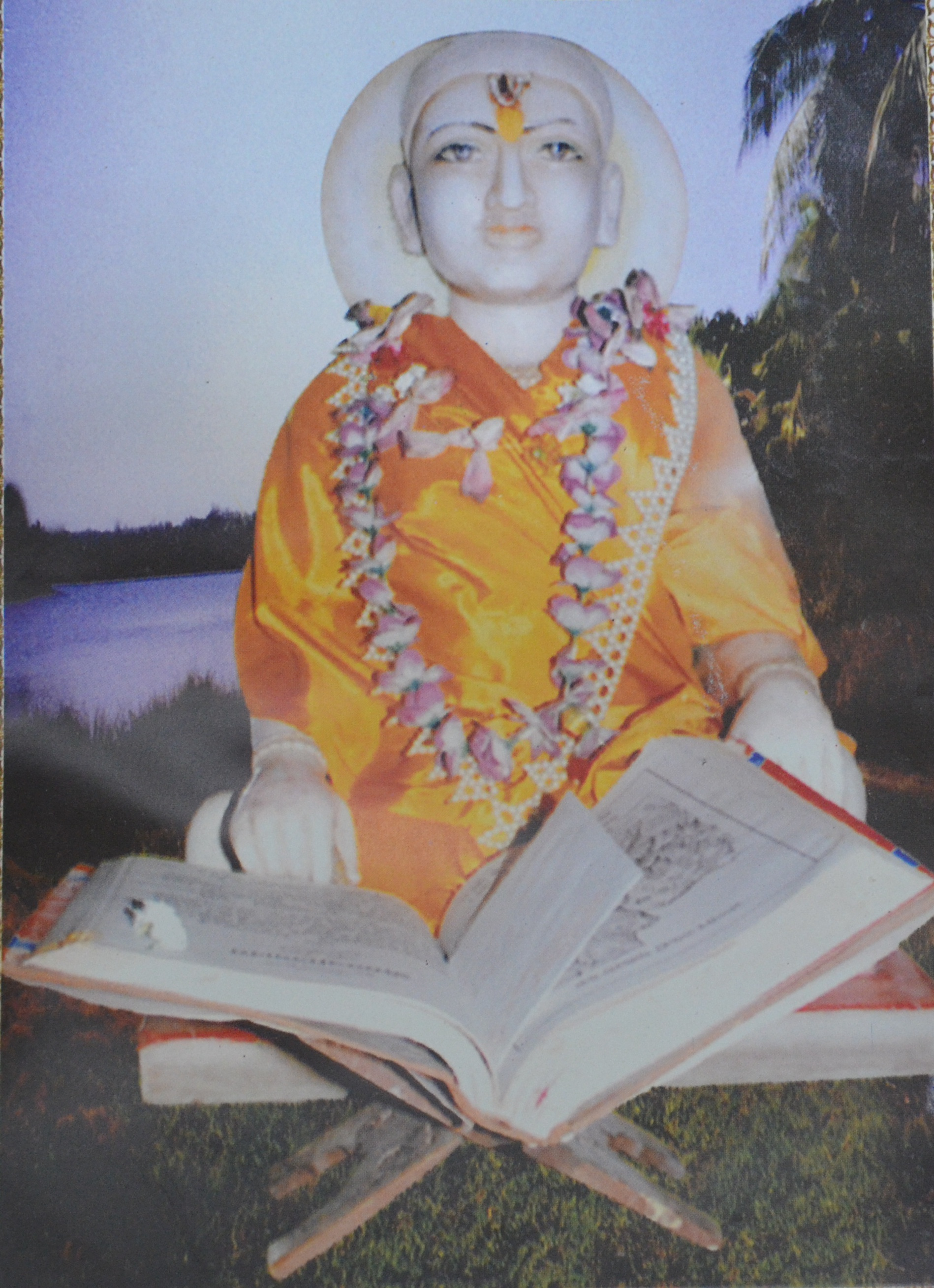
Tulsīdās

- Gosvāmī Tulsīdās तुलसीदास, also known as "Tulasī Dāsa" and "Tulsidas" (11 August 1511 – 30 July 1623) Awadhi poet and philosopher.
- Narottama Dasa, a Gaudiya Vaishnava saint who was responsible for spreading Vaishnava bhakti throughout Odisha in and outside Bengal in India. He had worked in Awadhi.
- Malik Muhammad Jayasi (1477–1542) poet who wrote in the Avadhi dialect, known for his work Padmavat.
- Rambhadracharya (b.14 January 1950)[β] is a Hindu religious leader, educator, Sanskrit scholar, polyglot, poet, author, textual commentator, philosopher, composer, singer, playwright and Katha artist.
- Jumai Khan Azad (b.5 August 1930, d.29 December 2013) a poet.
- Ramai Kaka a.k.a. Chandra Bhushan Trivedi popular for Akashvani play 'Bahire Baba' in Awadhi language.

== See also ==
- List of Hindi authors
- List of Hindi-language poets
- List of Indian poets
- List of Indian writers
