= Abhay Pratap Singh =

Indian politician

Raja Abhay Pratap Singh

Member of Parliament, Lok Sabha
- In office 1991–1996
- Preceded by: Dinesh Singh
- Succeeded by: Rajkumari Ratna Singh
- Constituency: Pratapgarh

Personal details
- Born: 7 December 1936 Pratapgarh, United Provinces, British India
- Died: 7 August 2013 (aged 76) Jaipur, Rajasthan, India
- Party: Janata Dal; Indian National Congress
- Spouse: Asha Kumari
- Children: Rekha Rani Singh Raja Anil Pratap Singh Alka Rani Singh Rani Archana Singh
- Parent: Raja Ajit Pratap Singh (father)
- Pretender information
- Title(s): Raja of Pratapgarh
- Throne(s) claimed: Pratapgarh
- Pretend from: 2000–2013
- Monarchy abolished: Sovereign Monarchy; 1947 (Instrument of Accession); Titular Monarchy; 1971 (26th Amendment of the Indian Constitution)
- Last monarch: Raja Ajit Pratap Singh
- Successor: Raja Anil Pratap Singh

Raja Abhay Pratap Singh (7 December 1936 – 7 August 2013), also known as Bade Raja, was an Indian politician and member of parliament from the party Janata Dal. He represented 10th Loksabha of Pratapgarh constituency in Uttar Pradesh.
