= Vishwanathganj Assembly constituency =

Constituency of the Uttar Pradesh legislative assembly in India

Coordinates: 25.81°N 81.94°E

Vishwanathganj
- Constituency No. 247 for the Uttar Pradesh Legislative Assembly

Constituency details
- Country: India
- Region: North India
- State: Uttar Pradesh
- District: Pratapgarh
- Total electors: 3,99,623
- Reservation: None

Member of Legislative Assembly
- 18th Uttar Pradesh Legislative Assembly
- Incumbent Jeet Lal
- Party: AD(S)
- Alliance: NDA
- Elected year: 2022

Vishwanathganj is a constituency of the Uttar Pradesh Legislative Assembly covering the city of Vishwanathganj in the Pratapgarh district of Uttar Pradesh, India.

Vishwanathganj is one of five assembly constituencies in the Pratapgarh Lok Sabha constituency. Since 2008, this assembly constituency is numbered 247 amongst 403 constituencies.

== Members of the Legislative Assembly ==
Year	Member	Party
Till 2012 : Constituency did not exist
2012	Raja Ram	Samajwadi Party
2014^	Rakesh Kumar Verma	Apna Dal
2017	Rakesh Kumar Verma	Apna Dal (Soneylal)
2022	Jeet Lal Patel	Apna Dal (Soneylal)

== Election results ==
=== 2027 ===
2027 Uttar Pradesh Legislative Assembly election: Vishwanathganj
Party	Candidate	Votes	%	±%
INDIA				
NDA				
BSP				
NOTA	None of the above			
Majority				
Turnout				
gain from		Swing		

=== 2022 ===
2022 Uttar Pradesh Legislative Assembly election: Vishwanathganj
Party	Candidate	Votes	%	±%
AD(S)	Jeet Lal Patel	86,829	43.21	▲1.56
SP	Saurabh Singh	38,777	19.3	
Independent	Sanjay Pandey	22,962	11.43	
JAP	Mohd Ashfaq	20,271	10.09	
BSP	Sanjay	16,633	8.28	▼8.95
INC	Prashant Singh	1,910	0.95	▼28.82
CPI	Maharani Deen	1,871	0.93	▼0.41
NOTA	None of the above	1,900	0.95	▼0.05
Majority		48,052	23.91	▲12.03
Turnout		200,930	50.28	▼1.39
AD(S) hold		Swing		

=== 2017 ===
Apna Dal (Sonelal) candidate Rakesh Kumar Verma won in 2017 Uttar Pradesh Legislative Elections defeating INC candidate Sanjay Pandey by a margin of 23,358 votes.

2017 Uttar Pradesh Legislative Assembly Election: Vishwanathgan
Party	Candidate	Votes	%	±%
AD(S)	Rakesh Kumar Verma	81,899	41.65	
INC	Sanjay Pandey	58,541	29.77	
BSP	Premanand Tripathi	33,878	17.23	
Independent	Rakesh Kumar	5,830	2.97	
CPI	Upendra Narayan	2,627	1.34	
Rashtriya Janta Party	Sushil Kumar	2,053	1.04	
NOTA	None of the above	1,951	1.0	
Majority		23,358	11.88	
Turnout		196,623	51.67	
