= Radha Charan Singh =

Last ruling Maharaja of Samthar from 1935–1950

HH Maharaja Radha Charan Singh Judeo Bahadur (15 May 1914 — 1972) was the last official ruler of Samthar State from 9 October 1935 till 1950. His father Bir Singh Judeo abdicated the throne in his favour due to old age. He reigned in the State of Samthar until 1950, when it was merged in to India. He held the title of Maharaja of Samthar until privy purses and official titles of all the princely states' rulers were abolished in 1971. He was survived by his son Ranjeet Singh Judeo.

His statue was unveiled in 2018 at Jhansi in the presence of several noted politicians including Vasundhara Raje. In 1970, a higher secondary school known as Maharaja Radha Charan Singh Uchh Madhyamik Shala was founded at Moth near Samthar in Jhansi district and named after him.
