= Niyaz Hasan Khan =

Indian politician (1918-2007)

Member of Uttar Pradesh legislative assembly
- Constituency: Kunda

Personal details
- Born: 1 October 1918
- Died: 2007
- Party: Indian National Congress

Niyaz Hasan Khan (1918–2007), also spelled Niaz, was an Indian National Congress leader and former MLA from Kunda (Vidhan Sabha constituency) in Uttar Pradesh.

== Political career ==
Niyaz Hasan Khan was MLA of Kunda (कुंडा / कुंडाहरनामगंज) from 1962 to 1969, 1974 to 1977, 1980 to 1991. He won 6 Vidhan Sabha elections from Kunda and lost three times. He was Speaker of UP Assembly at some point during his long tenure as MLA.
