= Ajit Pratap Singh =

Indian politician

Raja Ajit Pratap Singh

Member of Parliament, Lok Sabha
- In office 1962–1967
- Preceded by: Munishwar Dutt Upadhyay
- Succeeded by: Dinesh Singh
- Constituency: Pratapgarh
- In office 1980–1984
- Preceded by: Roop Nath Singh Yadav
- Succeeded by: Dinesh Singh
- Constituency: Pratapgarh
- Pretender information
- Title(s): Raja of Pratapgarh
- Throne(s) claimed: Pratapgarh
- Pretend from: 1971–2000
- Monarchy abolished: Sovereign Monarchy; 1947 (Instrument of Accession); Titular Monarchy; 1971 (26th Amendment of the Indian Constitution)
- Last monarch: Himself
- Successor: Raja Abhay Pratap Singh

Raja of Pratapgarh
- Reign: 1921–1947
- Predecessor: Raja Pratap Bahadur Singh
- Titular Reign: 1947–1971
- Born: 14 January 1917; Kulhipur, United Provinces of Agra and Oudh, British India
- Died: 6 January 2000 (aged 82); Lucknow, Uttar Pradesh, India
- Spouse: Rani Lakshmi Devi
- Political party: Indian National Congress
- Children: Raja Abhay Pratap Singh; Rajkumar Amar Pratap Singh

Raja Ajit Pratap Singh (14 January 1917 – 6 January 2000) was an Indian politician of Indian National Congress party from Pratapgarh, who was cabinet minister of Government of Uttar Pradesh (1969–77) and also the member of Lok Sabha twice from Pratapgarh constituency in 1962 and 1980.

== Early life and education ==
Born in the ruling family from taluqdari estate of Pratapgarh, established in the 17th century, Raja Ajit Pratap Singh was educated at St. Joseph's College, Allahabad, Senior Cambridge.

== Career ==
He was a member of Uttar Pradesh Legislative Assembly from 1946–52 and again 1967–77, during this period he was Cabinet Minister in the Government of Uttar Pradesh 1969–77. Thereafter remained member of the Rajya Sabha, 1958–62. He was elected to the 3rd Lok Sabha, 1962–67 (this time as a Jan Sangh candidate, opposing Congress), later he joined Congress and was elected again to the 7th Lok Sabha in 1980.

He was the Minister for Excise 1985, Minister for Excise and Forests 1988, Deputy Chairman of the State Planning Commission, Uttar Pradesh 1986–1988.

He was the President of the British India Association (Avadh) 1998/2000, Secretary-cum-Manager for the Colvin Taluqdars' College, Lucknow, 1998–2000.

In 1991, his son Abhay Pratap Singh, was elected from the same constituency from Janata Dal.

== Social work ==
He was Manager and Founder Member, P. B. Degree College, Pratapgarh; Manager, P. B. Inter College; Donated three hospitals to District Board, Pratapgarh and Member, Managing Committee, Colvin Taluqdars College, Lucknow.
