= Bir Singh Judeo =

Maharaja of Samthar from 1896–1935

HH Maharaja Sir Bir Singh Judeo Bahadur, KCIE (1864 - 1936) was a ruler of Samthar State from 17 Jun 1896 – 9 Oct 1935, when he abdicated throne due to old age in favour of his son Radha Charan Singh. He was knighted KCIE on 3 Jun 1915.
