= Powadra =

- Village
- Location in Punjab, India Powadra (India)
- Coordinates: 31.0165089°N 75.616021°E
- Country: India
- State: Punjab
- District: Jalandhar

Government
  - Type: Panchayat raj
  - Body: Gram panchayat
- Elevation: 240 m (790 ft)

Population (2011)
  - Total: 2,221
- Sex ratio 1099/1122 ♂/♀

Languages
  - Official: Punjabi
- Time zone: UTC+5:30 (IST)
- PIN: 144036
- Telephone: 01826
- ISO 3166 code: IN-PB
- Vehicle registration: PB- 37 & 08
- Post Office: Powadra
- Website: jalandhar.nic.in

Powadra is a village in Jalandhar district of Punjab State, India. It is located 3 km from postal head office in Bilga, 12 km from Nurmahal, 14 km from Phillaur, 41.3 km from district headquarter Jalandhar and 127 km from state capital Chandigarh. The village is administrated by a sarpanch who is an elected representative of village as per Panchayati raj (India).

== Transport ==
Nurmahal railway station is the nearest train station; however, Phillaur Junction train station is 15.7 km away from the village. The village is 44.7 km away from domestic airport in Ludhiana and the nearest international airport is located in Chandigarh also Sri Guru Ram Dass Jee International Airport is the second nearest airport which is 137 km away in Amritsar.
