= Raniganj, Uttar Pradesh Assembly constituency =

Constituency of the Uttar Pradesh legislative assembly in India

Coordinates: 25.80°N 82.04°E

Raniganj
- Constituency No. 250 for the Uttar Pradesh Legislative Assembly

Constituency details
- Country: India
- Region: North India
- State: Uttar Pradesh
- District: Pratapgarh
- Total electors: 3,36,072
- Reservation: None

Member of Legislative Assembly
- 18th Uttar Pradesh Legislative Assembly
- Incumbent Dr. R.K.Verma
- Party: Samajwadi Party
- Elected year: 2022

Raniganj is a constituency of the Uttar Pradesh Legislative Assembly covering the city of Raniganj in the Pratapgarh district of Uttar Pradesh, India.

Raniganj is one of five assembly constituencies in the Pratapgarh Lok Sabha constituency. Since 2008, this assembly constituency is numbered 250 amongst 403 constituencies. Dr RK Verma from Samajwadi Party is current MLA.

== Members of the Legislative Assembly ==
Year	Member	Party
Till 2012 : Constituency did not exist
2012	Shivakant Ojha	Samajwadi Party
2017	Dheeraj Ojha	Bharatiya Janata Party
2022	Rakesh Kumar Verma	Samajwadi Party

== Election results ==
=== 2027 ===
2027 Uttar Pradesh Legislative Assembly election: Raniganj
Party	Candidate	Votes	%	±%
INDIA				
NDA				
BSP				
NOTA	None of the above			
Majority				
Turnout				
gain from		Swing		

=== 2022 ===
2022 Uttar Pradesh Legislative Assembly election: Raniganj
Party	Candidate	Votes	%	±%
SP	Dr. R K Verma	75,583	40.05	+18.71
BJP	Abhay Kumar (Dheeraj Ojha)	72,934	38.65	+0.82
BSP	Ajay Yadav	21,411	11.35	−21.4
AIMIM	Anil Kumar	11,748	6.23	
NOTA	None of the above	1,139	0.6	−0.12
Majority		2,649	1.4	−3.68
Turnout		188,715	56.15	+0.05
SP gain from BJP		Swing		

=== 2017 ===
Bharatiya Janta Party's Dhiraj Ojha won in last Assembly election of 2017 Uttar Pradesh Legislative Elections defeating Bahujan Samaj Party candidate Shakeel Ahmad Khan by a margin of 9,009 votes.

2017 Uttar Pradesh Legislative Assembly Election: Ranigan
Party	Candidate	Votes	%	±%
BJP	Abhay Kumar Alias Dhiraj Ojha	67,031	37.83	
BSP	Shakeel Ahmad Khan	58,022	32.75	
SP	Prof.Shivakant Ojha	37,816	21.34	
NISHAD	Shreenath	2,052	1.16	
Independent	Prananjany	1,874	1.06	
NOTA	None of the above	1,259	0.72	
Majority		9,009	5.08	
Turnout		177,190	56.1	
