= Ram Vilas Vedanti =

Indian politician (1958–2025)

Member of Parliament, Lok Sabha
- In office 1996–1998
- Preceded by: Sheo Sharan Verma
- Succeeded by: Swami Chinmayanand
- Constituency: Machhlishahr
- In office 1998–1999
- Preceded by: Rajkumari Ratna Singh
- Succeeded by: Rajkumari Ratna Singh
- Constituency: Pratapgarh

Personal details
- Born: 7 October 1958 Rewa, Madhya Pradesh, India
- Died: 15 December 2025 (aged 67) Rewa district, Madhya Pradesh, India
- Party: Bharatiya Janata Party
- Education: Vedantacharya, Vidya Varidhi (Ph.D.), from Sampurnanand Sanskrit Vishwavidyalaya, Varanasi)
- Profession: Religious missionary, political and social worker, teacher and educationist and agriculturist
- As of 22 December, 2012

Ram Vilas Vedanti (7 October 1958 – 15 December 2025) was an Indian politician, Hindu religious leader and Member of Parliament of 12th Lok Sabha, affiliated with Bharatiya Janata Party serving Pratapgarh (UP) Lok Sabha Constituency. He was member of Shri Ram Janmabhoomi Trust and was a member of the Vishwa Hindu Parishad. Vedanti died on 15 December 2025, at the age of 67.
