= Akshay Pratap Singh =

Indian politician

Akshay Pratap Singh Gopal Ji

Member of Uttar Pradesh Legislative Council
- Incumbent
- Assumed office 2010
- Preceded by: Anand Bhushan Singh
- Constituency: Pratapgarh Local Authorities
- In office 2004–2004
- Preceded by: Himself
- Succeeded by: Anand Bhushan Singh (by-poll)
- Constituency: Pratapgarh Local Authorities
- In office 1998–2004
- Succeeded by: Himself
- Constituency: Pratapgarh Local Authorities

Member of Parliament, Lok Sabha
- In office 2004–2009
- Preceded by: Rajkumari Ratna Singh
- Succeeded by: Rajkumari Ratna Singh
- Constituency: Pratapgarh

Personal details
- Born: 14 April 1970 (age 56) Jamon, Uttar Pradesh, India
- Party: Jansatta Dal (Loktantrik)
- Other political affiliations: Samajwadi Party
- Spouse: Madhurima Singh (m. 1997)
- Relations: Rudra Pratap Singh (uncle)
- Children: 3 (1 son and 2 daughters)
- As of 17 September, 2006

Akshay Pratap Singh alias Gopal Ji (born 14 April 1970) is an Indian politician from Pratapgarh (Lok Sabha constituency) in Uttar Pradesh. He is the member of Uttar Pradesh Legislative Council. He has been elected as a MLC for the fifth consecutive time since 1998 from the same constituency.

== Political career ==
He started his political career in 1998 by contesting Uttar Pradesh Legislative Council elections as an independent candidate from the Pratapgarh seat. He won independently on Pratapgarh seat for 2 consecutive times. He is the Senior Leader and one of the founding members of Jansatta Dal Loktantrik whose President is Raghuraj Pratap Singh. He won the Pratapgarh seat in 2004 from Samajwadi Party. However, he lost the 2009 Indian general elections to Ratna Singh.

Singh has served multiple terms in the Uttar Pradesh Legislative Council and was elected as a Member of Parliament from Pratapgarh in 2004 representing the Samajwadi Party. In April 2022 at Uttar Pradesh Member of Legislative Council election he defeated BJP candidate Haripratap Singh by a margin of 1,091 and becoming MLC for the fifth time at Pratapgarh. As of April 2024, reports indicate that Singh, along with other erstwhile royals from Uttar Pradesh, was notably absent from the Lok Sabha elections, reflecting a shift away from their historical influence in the region.

== Personal life ==
He is the son of Shri Lal Shivpratap Singh, the younger brother of the heir of Jamon estate. He is the nephew of ex-MP Barabanki late Raja Dr. Rudra Pratap Singh (Raja Jamon Estate). He is the cousin of the politician Raja Bhaiya.

== Controversies ==
He is considered one of the most influential and powerful politicians of Uttar Pradesh and his name has been in a lot of controversies in UP politics.

On 2 November 2002, Mayawati-led government in Uttar Pradesh declared him a terrorist, and he was sent to jail under Prevention of Terrorism Act (POTA), along with his cousin's father Raja saheb Uday Pratap Singh and cousin Raghuraj Pratap Singh (Raja Bhaiya). Subsequently, Akshay managed to get bail, but Raghuraj's pleas were rejected many times.

In June 2014, an FIR was filed againist Akshay and 7 other people for the murder of Mahendra Pratap Singh who was the son of a senior INC leader namely Jang Bahadur Singh from Amethi. According to local sources Jang Bahadur and Akshay Pratap have had bad blood between them before the murder took place thats why akshay was the prime suspect in this case. Mahendra Pratap and his driver was shot dead while deshraj was injured in the firing that took place in Daulatpur village of Jagdishpur.

In February 2023, a complaint was filed against him by the wife of Raja Bhaiya, a prominent politician, alleging fraudulent acquisition of majority shares in a company.

Akshay Pratap Singh is facing several criminal cases, including one that is being investigated by the Central Bureau of Investigation.
