= Katra Medniganj =

- nagar panchayat
- Interactive map of Katra Medniganj
- Coordinates: 25.876235°N 81.951337°E
- Country: India
- State: Uttar Pradesh
- District: Pratapgarh

Population (2001)
  - Total: 7,815

Languages
  - Official: Hindi
- Time zone: UTC+5:30 (IST)
- Postal code: 230131
- Vehicle registration: UP-72
- Website: up.gov.in

Katra Medniganj is a town and a nagar panchayat in Pratapgarh district in the Indian state of Uttar Pradesh. The town is named Katra Medniganj to pay the respects to a great freedom fighter of 18th century, Shree Babu Medini Singh, brother of the soldier Babu Gulab Singh.

== Demographics ==
As of 2001 India census, Katra Medniganj had a population of 7,815. Males constitute 49% of the population and females 51%. Katra Medniganj has an average literacy rate of 65%, higher than the national average of 59.5%: male literacy is 72%, and female literacy is 58%. In Katra Medniganj, 16% of the population is under 6 years of age. It is situated near the Bhupiamau and Allahabad Faizabad road. It is situated 49 km from Allahabad and 90 km from District Raebareli.
