= Shivakant Ojha =

Indian politician

Member of the Uttar Pradesh Legislative Assembly for Raniganj
- In office March 2012 – March 2017

Personal details
- Born: 31 July 1951 (age 74) Pratapgarh, Uttar Pradesh
- Party: Bhartiya Janta Party
- Spouse: Madhuri Ojha
- Children: 1
- Profession: Politician

Shivakant Ojha is an Indian politician affiliated with Bhartiya Janata Party. He is member of Uttar Pradesh Legislative Assembly representing Raniganj constituency in Pratapgarh district, of Uttar Pradesh. On 18 January 2014, Prof. Ojha was assigned as Minister for Technical Education in Akhilesh Yadav's cabinet. He was removed as the Minister for Technical Education on 29 October by the Chief Minister of the state, Akhilesh Yadav. Later he was reinducted in the cabinet again as a Health Minister of the state on 26 September 2016.

== Early life and education ==
He lives in Ramaiyapur village, post Prithviganj in Pratapgarh, Uttar Pradesh. He is post graduate in Master of Arts from Allahabad University in 1973 and did Master of Philosophy from Meerut University in 1986. By profession, he teaches in college.

== Political career ==
He was MLA from Raniganj constituency of Pratapgarh district, Uttar Pradesh from 2012–2016. He won 2012 Uttar Pradesh Assembly Election with 38.96% votes gain. On 18 January 2012, Ojha was assigned as minister in Akhilesh Yadav’s cabinet. He was formerly affiliated with Bhartiya Janata Party and Bahujan Samaj Party. He unsuccessfully contested 2009 Lok Sabha elections on the ticket of BSP, defeated by Rajkumari Ratna Singh.
