= Rajaram Kisan =

Indian activist and politician

Pandit Rajaram Shukla Kisan

MLA
- In office 1952-1957
- Constituency: Rampur Khas

Personal details
- Born: 1917 Pratapgarh, British India
- Died: 17 December 2013 (aged 95–96) Lalganj Ajhara
- Party: Indian National Congress
- Spouse: Mrs. Amola Devi
- As of 26 March, 2013

Pandit Rajaram Shukl "Kisan" (1917 – 17 December 2013), also known as Rajaram Kisan, was an Indian Independence activist and politician who belongs to the Indian National Congress Party. He was elected MLA in 1952 and was member of the first state Uttar Pradesh Legislative Assembly (Vidhan Sabha), which had its term from 1952 to 1957.

On 17 December 2013 Rajaram died at Deum, Lalganj Ajhara.
