= Kunda, India =

Kunda
- Town
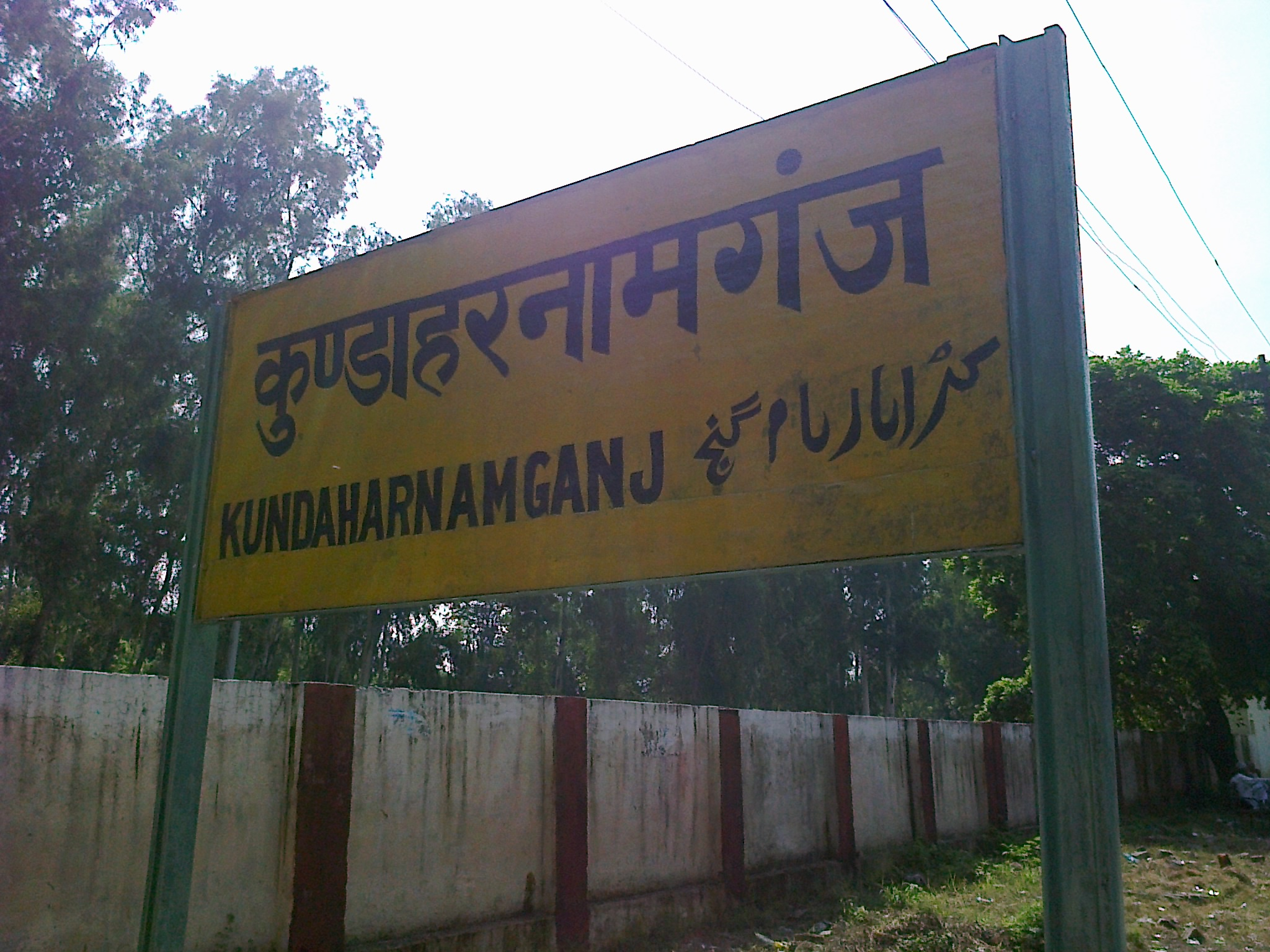
- Kunda Railway Station
- Nickname: Kunda
- Location in Uttar Pradesh, India Kunda (India)
- Coordinates: 25.72°N 81.52°E
- Country: India
- State: Uttar Pradesh
- District: Pratapgarh

Government
  - Body: Gram panchayat
  - MLA: Raghuraj Pratap Singh

Area
  - Total: 15,000 km^{2} (5,800 sq mi)
- Elevation 291: 135 m (443 ft)

Population (2020)
  - Total: 51,500
  - Density: 3,433.3/km^{2} (8,892/sq mi)

Language
  - Official: Hindi
  - Additional official: Urdu
  - Local: Awadhi
- Time zone: UTC+5:30 (IST)
- PIN: 230204
- Telephone code: 05341
- Vehicle registration: UP-72
- Website: pratapgarh.nic.in

Kunda is a town and a Tehsil in Pratapgarh district in the Indian state of Uttar Pradesh.

== Geography ==
Kunda is at 25.72°N 81.52°E. It has an average elevation of 9 metres (291 feet). It is on Prayagraj-Lucknow National Highway 24B.

== Demographics ==
As of the 2011 Census of India, Kunda had a population of 910,447. Males constitute 50% of the population and females 50%. 72% of the whole population are from general caste 27% are from scheduled caste and 0%from scheduled tribe. Kunda has an average literacy rate of 66%, greater than the national average of 59.5%: male literacy is 73%, and female literacy is 59%. In Kunda, 14% of the population is under 6 years of age.

== Government and politics ==
Raghuraj Pratap Singh, founder of Jansatta Dal (Loktantrik) party, is the Member of Legislative Assembly (MLA) from Kunda constituency in Uttar Pradesh Legislative Assembly since 1993.
