= Munishwar Chandar Dawar =

Indian physician (1946–2025)

- Born: 16 January 1946; Punjab Province, British India
- Died: 4 July 2025 (aged 79)
- Other name: Twenty Rupees Doctor
- Known for: Physician
- Awards: Padma Shri (2023)

Munishwar Chandar Dawar (16 January 1946 – 4 July 2025) was an Indian physician who was known for treating needy people for twenty rupees. In 2023, he was awarded the Padma Shri by the Indian Government for his contribution in the field of medicine.

== Early life and education ==
Dawar was born on 16 January 1946 in Punjab, India. After the partition of India and Pakistan, he moved to Jalandhar in Punjab. His schooling was in Jalandhar. He completed his MBBS from Jabalpur in 1967.

== Career ==
Dawar started his career in 1971 by joining the Army as a doctor during the Indo-Pakistani war. In 1972, he started his practice in Jabalpur, and he charged two rupees. In March 2022, he increased his fee to twenty rupees. He died on 4 July 2025, aged 79.

== Death ==
Dawar died on 4 July 2025, at the age of 79. He had been ill for several days.

== Awards ==
- Padma Shri in 2023
