= Rakesh Kumar Verma =

Indian politician

Dr. R.K. Verma

Member of Legislative Assembly of Uttar Pradesh
- Incumbent
- Assumed office 10 March 2022
- Preceded by: Dhiraj Ojha
- Constituency: Raniganj

Member of Legislative Assembly of Uttar Pradesh
- In office 12 March 2017 – 10 March 2022
- Preceded by: Himself
- Succeeded by: Jeet Lal
- Constituency: Vishwanathganj

Member of Legislative Assembly of Uttar Pradesh
- In office 16 May 2014 – 12 March 2017
- Preceded by: Rajaram Pandey
- Succeeded by: Himself
- Constituency: Vishwanathganj

Personal details
- Born: 29 November 1974 (age 51) Saraidevray, Mandhata Pratapgarh
- Party: Samajwadi Party
- Spouse: Anisha Verma
- Education: University of Allahabad (B.Sc.); Hemwati Nandan Bahuguna Garhwal University (B.A.M.S.)
- As of 24 June 2014

Rakesh Kumar Verma also known as Dr. R.K. Verma is a MLA for Raniganj constituency of Pratapgarh, Uttar Pradesh with the Samajwadi Party.

He hails from village Sarai Devrai post Katra Gulab Singh in Pratapgarh.
