= Sangam Lal Gupta =

Indian politician (born 1971)

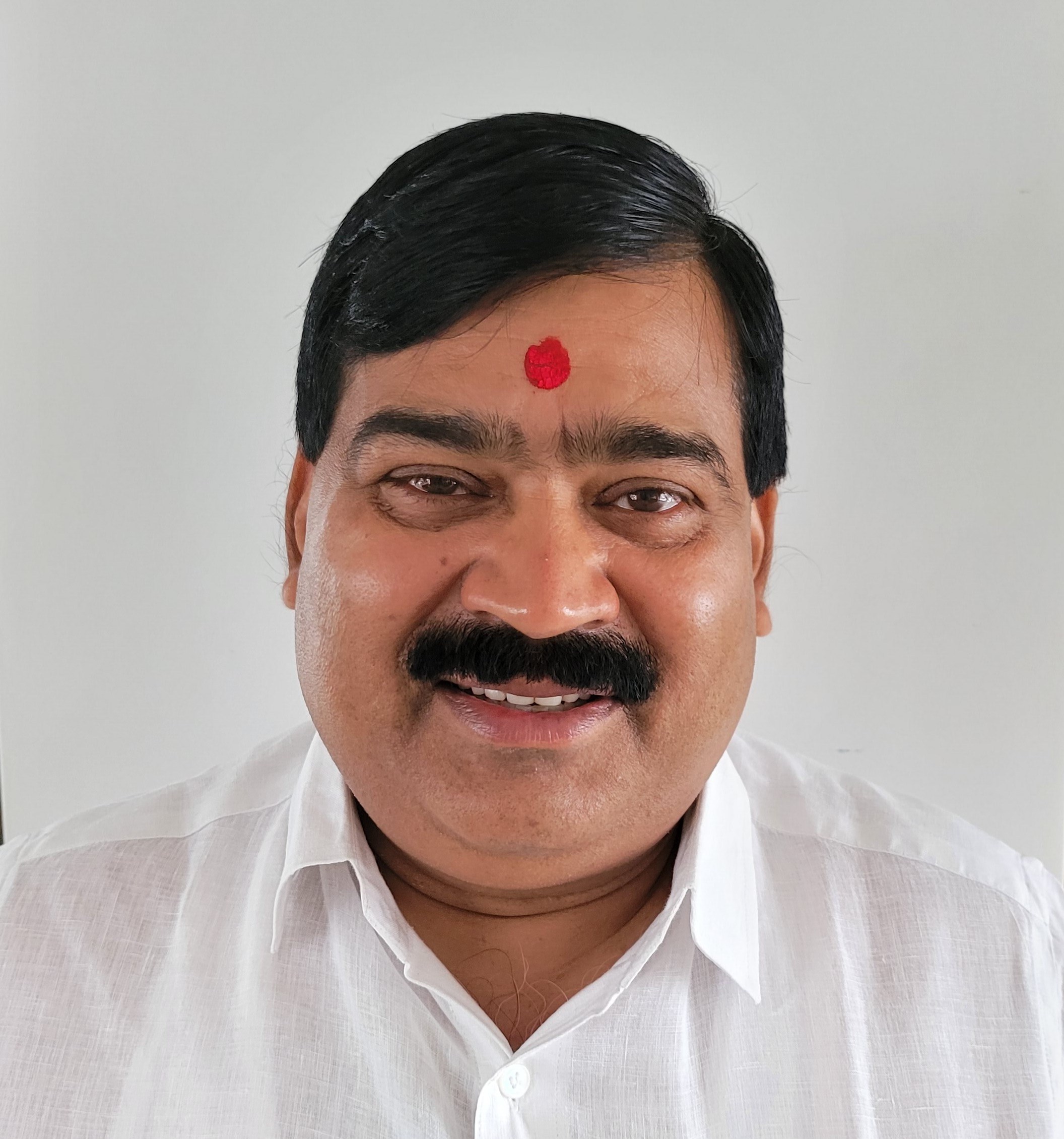

Member of Parliament, Lok Sabha
- In office 23 May 2019 – 04 June 2024
- Preceded by: Harivansh Singh
- Succeeded by: Shiv Pal Singh Patel
- Constituency: Pratapgarh

Member of the Uttar Pradesh Legislative Assembly
- In office 2017–2019
- Preceded by: Nagendra Singh

Personal details
- Born: 1 April 1971 (age 55) Katra Medniganj, Uttar Pradesh, India
- Party: Bharatiya Janata Party (since 2019)
- Other political affiliations: Apna Dal (Sonelal) (2017–2019)
- Spouse: Santra Devi Gupta m.1989
- Children: Rahul, Shubham, Poonam
- Occupation: Politician, Business

Sangam Lal Gupta (born 1 April 1971) is an Indian politician from Uttar Pradesh. Gupta was elected as a member of the Uttar Pradesh Legislative Assembly from Pratapgarh in 2017 as a member of Apna Dal (Sonelal). He was then elected as Bharatiya Janata Party member to Lok Sabha in 2019 from Pratapgarh PC seat. He currently serves as the Member of BJP National Council, National General Secretary of the OBC Morcha of the Bharatiya Janata Party.
