= Ratna Singh =

Indian politician (born 1959)

Rajkumari Ratna Singh
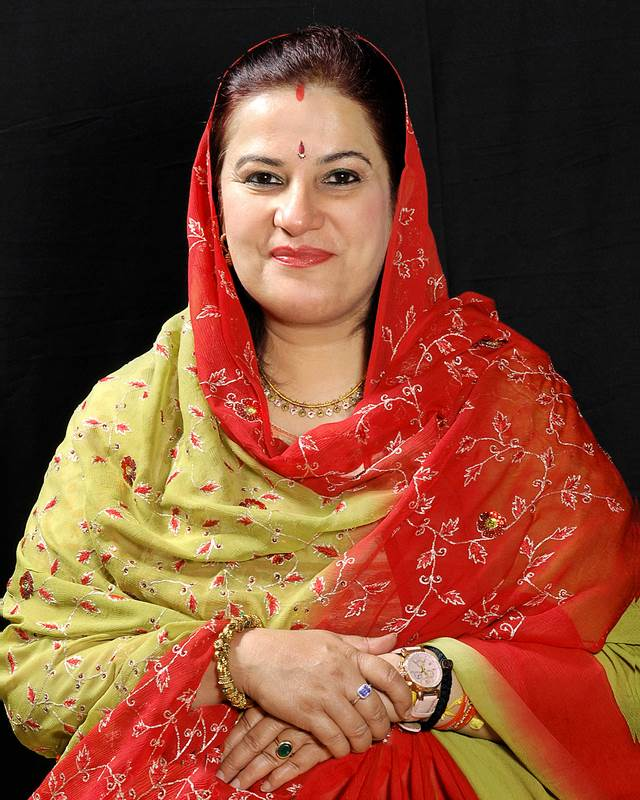

Member of Parliament, Lok Sabha
- In office 1996–1998
- Preceded by: Abhay Pratap Singh
- Succeeded by: Ram Vilas Vedanti
- Constituency: Pratapgarh
- In office 1999–2004
- Preceded by: Ram Vilas Vedanti
- Succeeded by: Akshay Pratap Singh
- Constituency: Pratapgarh
- In office 2009–2014
- Preceded by: Akshay Pratap Singh
- Succeeded by: Harivansh Singh
- Constituency: Pratapgarh

Personal details
- Born: 29 April 1959 (age 67) New Delhi, India
- Party: Indian National Congress (1995–2019); Bharatiya Janta Party (2019–present)
- Spouse: Jaisingh Sisodia (m. 1987)
- Children: 2
- Parent: Raja Dinesh Singh

Rajkumari Ratna Singh (born 29 April 1959) is an Indian politician, daughter of former minister Dinesh Singh. She has been elected MP from Pratapgarh to Lok Sabha thrice from Congress party in 1996, 1999 and 2009. But after coming third in two consecutive Lok Sabha elections (2014 and 2019) on Congress ticket, she left to join Bharatiya Janata Party in October 2019.

== Career ==
She had won from Pratapgarh in 1999, but lost the 2004 elections to Akshay Pratap Singh alias Gopalji. Ratna and Raghuraj Pratap Singh are both related but hail from different branches.

Ratna Singh regained the Pratapgarh constituency in the 2009 Indian general elections, defeating her nearest Samajwadi Party rival Prof. Shivakant Ojha, by over 30,000 votes. Akshay Pratap Singh came in third, and fourth was the noted criminal-politician Ateeq Ahmed who was fighting the elections from prison. Partly, her victory has been attributed to a re-allocation of the boundaries of the electoral district, whereby Raja Bhaiya's Kunda district was re-apportioned to a separate area.

Subsequently, in the 2014 Indian general elections she was defeated by Harivansh Singh of Apna Dal.

== Personal life ==
She is the youngest daughter of former Minister of External Affairs Dinesh Singh. She is married to Jaisingh Sisodia of Pratapgarh, Rajasthan. The couple have a son, Bhuvanyu Singh and a daughter Tanushree Kumari.
