= Samthar =

- city
- Location in Uttar Pradesh, India Samthar (India)
- Coordinates: 25.84°N 78.90°E
- State: Uttar Pradesh
- District: Jhansi

Population (2001)
  - Total: 20,227

Languages
  - Official: Hindi
- Time zone: UTC+5:30 (IST)
- Vehicle registration: UP
- Website: up.gov.in

Samthar is a city and a municipal board in Jhansi district in the Indian state of Uttar Pradesh. Historically before independence of India, it was also known as Samshergarh erstwhile capital of Samthar State.

== Demographics ==
As of 2001 census, Samthar had a population of 20,227. Males constitute 53% of the population and females 47%. Samthar has an average literacy rate of 55%, lower than the national average of 59.5%: male literacy is 66%, and female literacy is 43%. In Samthar, 16% of the population is under 6 years of age.

== History ==
Samthar was formerly known as Samshergarh and was capital of the princely state of Samthar State. The independent state of Samthar was created by king Chandrabhan Singh Judev and his grandson Madan Singh judev.

The founder was Ranjith Singh, who was a diwan of Datia. In 1817 Samthar was recognized as a state by the British.

They received a sanad of adoption in 1862. In 1884 the state had to cede some territories for the construction of the railways.

Mahraja Chattar Singh Bahadar succeeded the throne in 1865. His great-grandson, Raja Ranjit Singh declared himself as the Raja towards the end of the 18th century.
