= Munishwar Dutt Upadhyay =

Member of Parliament, Lok Sabha
- In office 1951–1962
- Preceded by: Position established
- Succeeded by: Ajit Pratap Singh
- Constituency: Pratapgarh

Personal details
- Born: 3 August 1898 Pratapgarh, North-Western Provinces, British India
- Died: 26 June 1983 (aged 84) Pratapgarh, Uttar Pradesh, India
- Party: Indian National Congress
- Spouse: Annapurna Upadhyay
- Children: Kranti Kumar Upadhyay, Geeta Upadhyay & Meera Upadhyay
- As of 13 August, 2012

Munishwar Dutt Upadhyay (3 August 1898 – 26 June 1983) was an Indian politician, statesman, and leader in the Indian independence movement. He was a Member of Parliament from Pratapgarh, Uttar Pradesh, belonging to the Indian National Congress.

== Early life ==
He was born 3 August 1898 in Lakshmanpur Village, Lalganj Tehsil of Pratapgarh district, Uttar Pradesh, to Gazadhar Prasad Upadhyay. He was an exceptionally bright student and learner. He matriculated from Somvanshi Higher Secondary School (PB Inter College), Pratapgarh and did his post-graduation at Kayastha Pathshala, Allahabad, and law education from Allahabad University. Soon he started working with the mayor's office in Allahabad. He married Annapoorna Upadhyay in 1933.

== Political life ==
He was a member of the Constituent Assembly of India and was the only person from Pratapgarh who signed the draft of the Indian Constitution. Post-independence, he became the first candidate from Pratapgarh to become a Member of Parliament twice, once in 1951 in the first Lok Sabha elections, then again in 1957 in the second Lok Sabha elections.

After sweeping wins in the first two elections from the Pratapgarh constituency, he was defeated in the third Lok Sabha election by Jan Sangh candidate, Ajit Pratap Singh.

He was secretary of the Congress Parliamentary Board and chairman of the Railway Reforms Committee. He also held the position of Revenue Minister in Uttar Pradesh Cabinet during C. B. Gupta's Chief Ministry for a short period between 1969 and 1970.

== Literary works ==
- Kisan Sangathan
- Zamindari Pratha

== Death ==
He died on 26 June 1983 in Pratapgarh and was survived by a son and two daughters.

== Books & memoirs ==
- Ek aur Kaljyeyi
- Belha ke laal by Dr. Dayaram Ratna Maurya
