= Bajrang Bahadur Singh =

Rai Bajrang Bahadur Singh
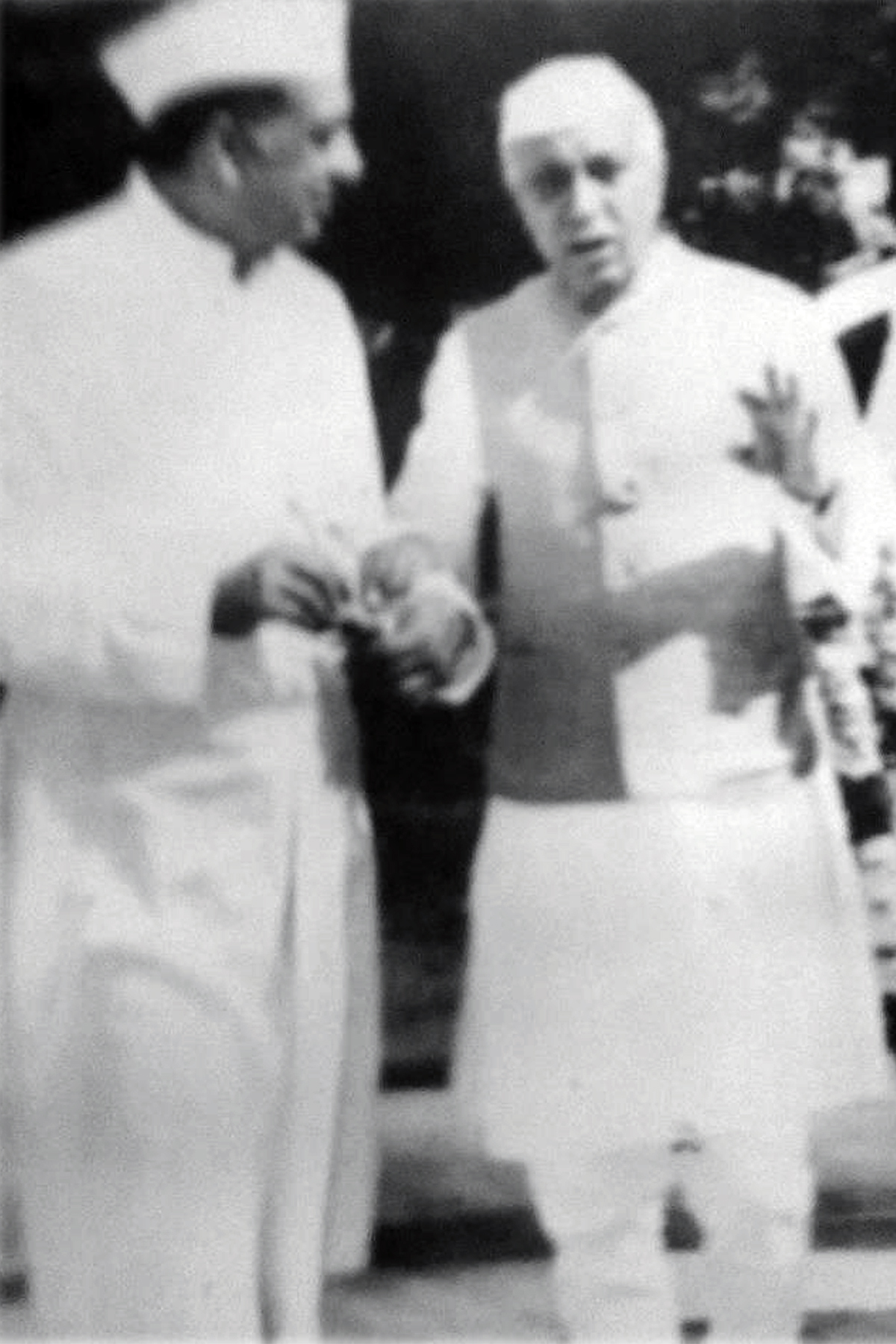
- Rai Bajrang Bahadur Singh of Bhadri (left) with Pandit Jawaharlal Nehru

Lieutenant Governor of Himachal Pradesh
- In office 1 January 1955 – 13 August 1963
- Preceded by: Maj. Gen. Himmatsinhji
- Succeeded by: Bhagwan Sahay
- Pretender information
- Title(s): Rai of Bhadri
- Throne(s) claimed: Bhadri
- Pretend from: 1971–1973
- Monarchy abolished: Sovereign Monarchy; 1947 (Instrument of Accession); Titular Monarchy; 1971 (26th Amendment of the Indian Constitution)
- Last monarch: Himself
- Successor: Rai Uday Pratap Singh

Rai of Bhadri
- Reign: 1926–1947
- Predecessor: Rai Krishna Pratap Singh
- Titular Reign: 1947–1971
- Born: 1906
- Died: 1973 (aged 66–67)
- Spouse: Rani Girija Devi
- Children: one daughter Rai Uday Pratap Singh (nephew & adopted son)

Rai Bajrang Bahadur Singh (1906–1973) was an Indian independence activist and politician, who served as the second Lieutenant Governor of Indian state Himachal Pradesh from 1 January 1955 to 13 August 1963.

He was also the founder Vice-Chancellor of Pantnagar University. He adopted his nephew Rai Uday Pratap Singh as his son. He was ruler of Taluqdari estate of Bhadri in Oudh.

== See also ==
- List of governors of Himachal Pradesh
- Bhadri (estate)
- Pantnagar University

Government offices
Preceded by Maj. Gen. Himmatsinhji	Lieutenant Governor of Himachal Pradesh; 1 January 1955 – 13 August 1963	Succeeded by Bhagwan Sahay
