= Jansatta Dal (Loktantrik) =

Political party in Uttar Pradesh, India

- Abbreviation: JD(L)
- Leader: Akshay Pratap Singh
- President: Raghuraj Pratap Singh
- Founder: Raghuraj Pratap Singh (Raja Bhaiya)
- Founded: 30 November 2018
- Headquarters: Lucknow
- Youth wing: Raja Bhaiya Youth Brigade
- Ideology: Anti-Casteism; Secularism; Political Equality
- Colors: Yellow Green
- Seats in Uttar Pradesh Legislative Council: 1 / 100
- Seats in Uttar Pradesh Legislative Assembly: 2 / 403

Election symbol
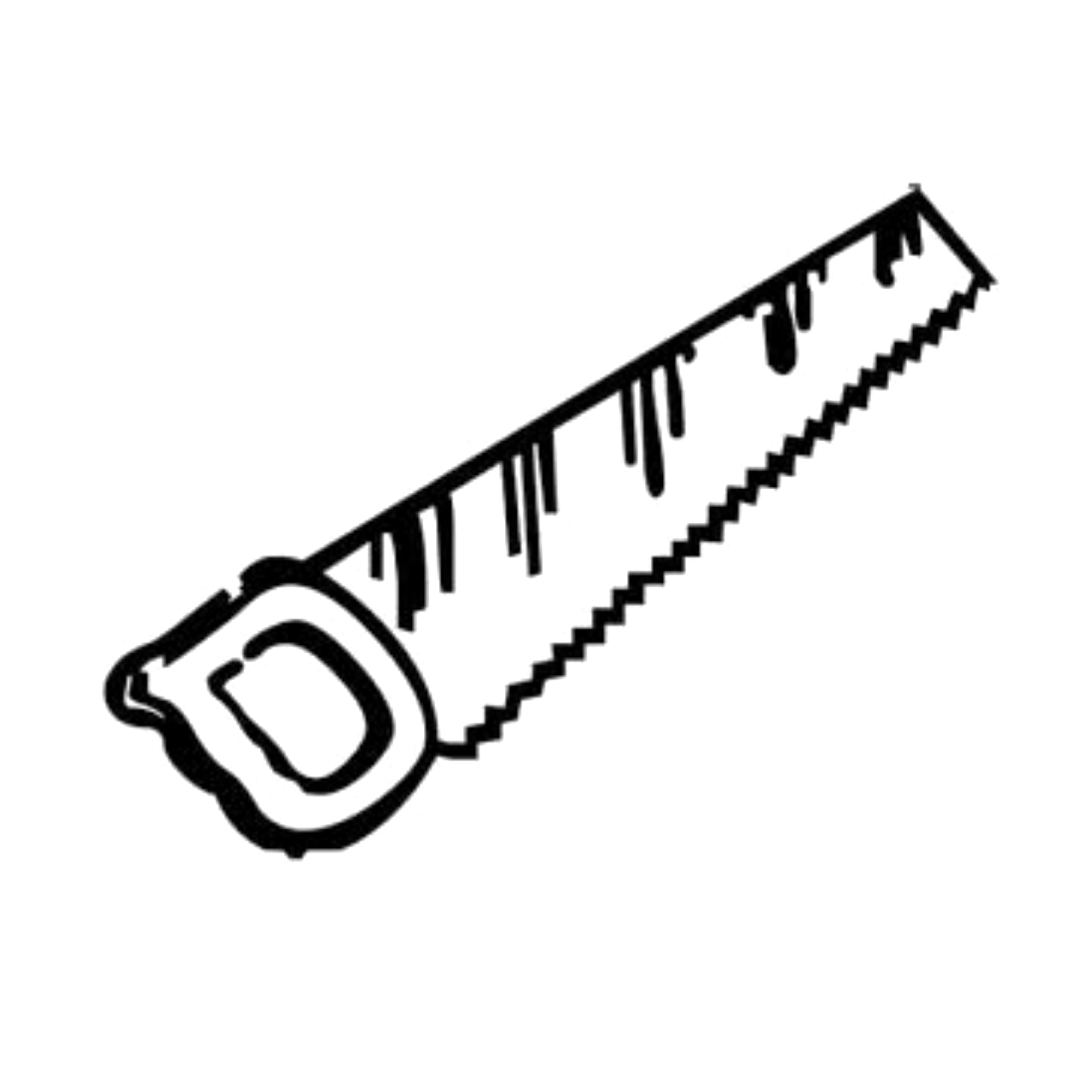

Website
- www.jdl.org.in

Jansatta Dal (Loktantrik) is a political party in Uttar Pradesh, India, launched by Raghuraj Pratap Singh, commonly known as Raja Bhaiya, in November 2018 at Ramabai Park, Lucknow, during a rally marking his 25 years in politics and after taking feedback from his electorate who overwhelmingly supported for forming a new party.

The party has raised the issues related to caste-based preferences in election and stands against casteism in politics. The party has also raised issues regarding disparity in the reservation system and SC/ST act to non-Dalits, in education and employment. Raja Bhaiyya's party won two seats in the Uttar Pradesh elections of 2022. Even after personal targeting by SP candidate Gulshan Yadav and SP president Akhilesh Yadav, Raja Bhaiya won his seat comfortably.

Aside from Raghuraj Pratap Singh, the party had early support from Akshay Pratap Singh, Vinod Saroj and Shailendra Kumar.

== See also ==
- List of political parties in India
