= Pratapgarh Estate =

Taluqdari estate in Oudh (1628–1947)

- 1628–1947
- Status: Taluqdari estate
- Capital: Pratapgarh
- Common languages: Awadhi, Hindi
- Religion: Hinduism
- Government: Monarchy
- Raja
  - 1628–1682: Babu Pratap Singh (first)
  - 1921–1947: Raja Ajit Pratap Singh (last)
- Historical era: Early modern period
  - Established: 1628
  - Acceded to India: 1947
Succeeded by
Dominion of India
- Today part of: Uttar Pradesh, Republic of India

Pratapgarh was an estate (taluqdari) of Oudh, British India. The Taluqdari was controlled by the Somvanshi clan of Rajputs. Now it is part of Pratapgarh district in Uttar Pradesh, India.

== History ==
The rulers of the estate were originally ruling from a place known as Taroul or Tiroul near Allahabad. The ancestor of the family was Babu Sujan Shah, son of Raja Sangram Shah of Tiroul. Later a descendant, Babu Pratap Singh (1628–1682) came to the region known as Rampur and built a fort, and gave the city its current name, Pratapgarh.

== List of rulers ==
- Babu Pratap Singh (1628–1682)
- Babu Jai Singh (1682–1728)
- Babu Chhataradari Singh
- Babu Prithvipat Singh
- Babu Duniapat Singh
- Raja Bahadur Singh
- Raja Abhiman Singh
- Raja Gulab Singh
- Raja Ajit Singh (1857–1889)
- Raja Pratap Bahadur Singh (1889–1921)
- Raja Ajit Pratap Singh (1921–2000), crowned at the age of four, Member of Parliament of 3rd & 4th Lok Sabha.
- Raja Abhay Pratap Singh (2000–2013), Member of Parliament of 10th Lok Sabha.
- Raja Anil Pratap Singh (2013–Present)

== See also ==
- Kalakankar
- Bhadri (estate)
- Amethi Estate
