= Bhadri =

- Village
- Location in Uttar Pradesh, India Bhadri (India)
- Coordinates: 25.6831449°N 81.568419°E
- Country: India
- State: Uttar Pradesh
- District: Pratapgarh

Population (2011)
  - Total: 2,985

Languages
  - Official: Hindi, Awadhi
- Time zone: UTC+5:30 (IST)
- Sex ratio: 1.047 ♂/♀

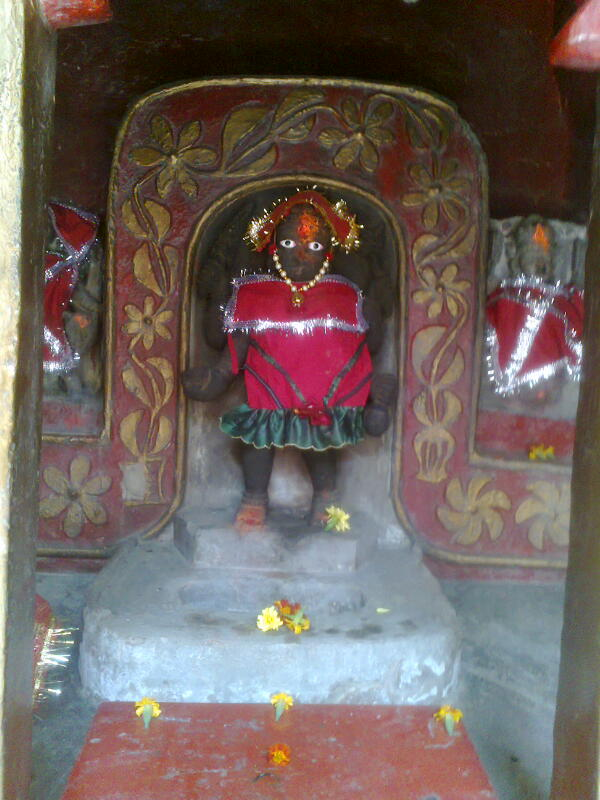
Kali Mata Mandir, Bhadri Kunda, Pratapgarh

Bhadri is a village of Pratapgarh district in the Indian state of Uttar Pradesh.

== Demographics ==
As of 2011 latest census, Bhadri has a population of 2,985 divided into 563 families. Male population is 1,458 and the female population is 1,527. Bhadri has an average literacy rate of 66.23 percent, almost same as state average of 67.68 percent, male literacy is 82.24 percent, and female literacy is 51.59 percent. In Bhadri, 13.50 percent of the population is under 6 years of age.

Caste composition
Caste	Percent
SC	30.95%
Others†	69.05%
Caste composition † Other Backward Class and Forward caste.

=== Work Profile ===
Out of the total population, 972 are engaged in work or business activity. 31.38 percent of workers describe their work as main work, 36 are cultivators while 63 are agricultural labourers. The estate included numerous villages, agricultural lands, and administrative centers. Its location allowed it to maintain strong trade connections and sustain a large population dependent on farming and allied activities. The story of Bhadri Estate is not merely about landownership; it is a narrative of power, resistance, administration, culture, and transformation over centuries.
