= Pratapgarh district, Uttar Pradesh =

Pratapgarh district
- District of Uttar Pradesh
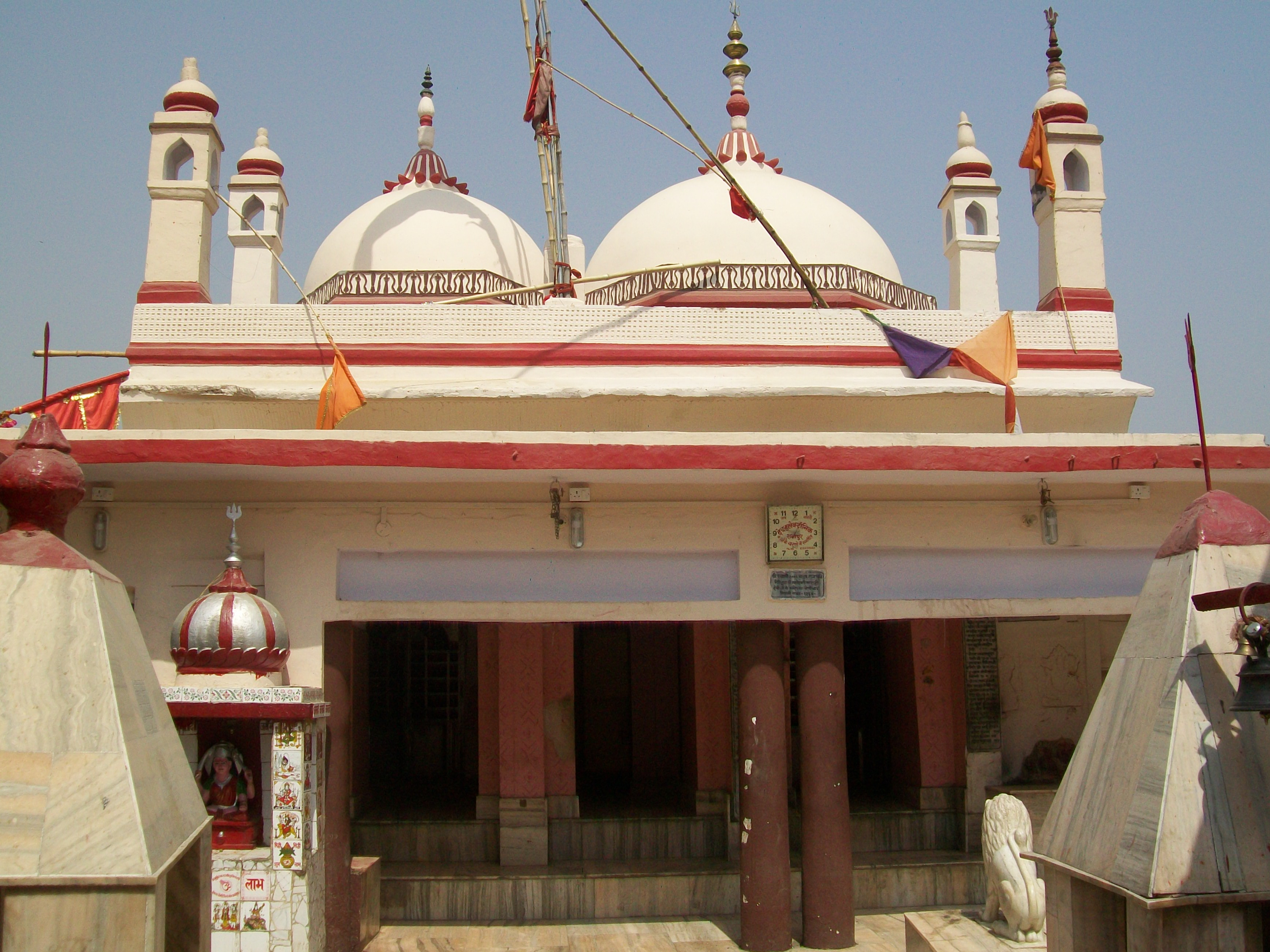
- Chauharjan Devi Temple

- Location of Pratapgarh district in Uttar Pradesh
- Coordinates (Pratapgarh, Uttar Pradesh): 25.897°N 81.945°E
- Country: India
- State: Uttar Pradesh
- Division: Prayagraj
- Headquarters: Pratapgarh
- Tehsils: Raniganj, Kunda, Lalganj, Patti, Sadar

Government
  - Lok Sabha constituencies: Pratapgarh (Lok Sabha constituency)
  - Vidhan Sabha constituencies: 1. Babaganj 2. Kunda 3. Patti 4. Sadar 5. Rampur Khas 6. Raniganj 7. Vishwanathganj

Area
  - Total: 3,730 km^{2} (1,440 sq mi)

Population (2011)
  - Total: 3,209,141
  - Density: 860/km^{2} (2,230/sq mi)
  - Urban: 175,242

Demographics
  - Literacy: 73.1 %
- Time zone: UTC+05:30 (IST)
- Major highways: NH-96, NH-236
- Website: pratapgarh.nic.in

Pratapgarh district is one of the districts of Uttar Pradesh in India. Pratapgarh administrative headquarters is located in Pratapgarh city. The district is part of the Prayagraj division (formerly known as Allahabad). Pratapgarh covers a total area of 3,730 km^{2}.

== Wildlife ==
The district has Ganga Dolphins in its river.

== History ==
The city Pratapgarh is named by Somvanshi Dynasty ruler Raja Pratap Bahadur Singh, a Rajput ruler who built a castle named Pratapgarh Mahal. After time around the areas of the castle was also known by, Pratapgarh; In 1928, the arrival of Simon Commission in India led to widespread agitations against the British government. Many of the talukdars took the lead in the movement and openly displayed their opposition against the Imperial Government. On 10 July the Congress politician Jawaharlal Nehru and Mohanlal Saxena, visited the Pratapgarh district to address a public meeting at Hadi Hall (in Bela Pratapgarh), they were welcomed by Brajesh Singh. The district was also visited by Mahatma Gandhi on 14 November 1929, who addressed a crowd of 5000 and was awarded a purse of Rs 5,570 by then-Raja Awadhesh Singh of Kalakankar.

== Economy ==
In 2006 the Ministry of Panchayati Raj named Pratapgarh one of the country's 250 most backward districts (out of a total of 640). It is one of the 34 districts in Uttar Pradesh currently receiving funds from the Backward Regions Grant Fund Programme (BRGF).

== Demographics ==
Historical population
Year	Pop.	±% p.a.
1901	908,105	—
1911	895,279	−0.14%
1921	850,752	−0.51%
1931	901,618	+0.58%
1941	1,036,496	+1.40%
1951	1,106,805	+0.66%
1961	1,252,196	+1.24%
1971	1,422,707	+1.28%
1981	1,801,049	+2.39%
1991	2,210,700	+2.07%
2001	2,731,174	+2.14%
2011	3,209,141	+1.63%

Religions in Pratapgarh district (2011)
Religion	Percent
Hinduism	85.11%
Islam	14.10%
Other or not stated	0.79%
Distribution of religions

According to the 2011 census Pratapgarh district, Uttar Pradesh had a population of 3,209,141, roughly equal to the nation of Mongolia or the US state of Iowa. This gives it a ranking of 109th in India (out of a total of 640). The district had a population density of 854 inhabitants per square kilometre (2,210/sq mi). Its population growth rate over the decade 2001-2011 was 16.2%. Pratapgarh had a sex ratio of 994 females for every 1000 males, and a literacy rate of 73.1%. 5.46% of the population lives in urban areas. Scheduled Castes make up 22.10% of the population.

Languages of Pratapgarh district (2011)
1. Hindi (90.7%)
2. Awadhi (6.02%)
3. Urdu (3.13%)
4. Others (0.11%)

At the time of the 2011 Census of India, 90.74% of the population in the district spoke Hindi, 6.02% Awadhi and 3.13% Urdu as their first language.

== Administration ==
There are 17 blocks in Pratapgarh district.

== Notable persons ==
- Munishwar Dutt Upadhyay, freedom fighter, later became only member of Constituent Assembly from Pratapgarh and twice elected Member of Parliament from Pratapgarh.
- Swami Karpatri Maharaj, spiritual leader and founder of Ramrajya party
- Rajesh Kumar Mishra, leader and politician at Kisaan Morcha, BJP
- Bajrang Bahadur Singh, founder vice-chancellor of Pant Nagar University and later the second Lieutenant Governor of Himachal Pradesh state of India
- Jagadguru Kripalu Maharaj (1922–2013), Hindu spiritual leader and saint from Mangarh, Pratapgarh
- Dinesh Singh (1925–1995), Deputy Minister in the ministry of external affairs and served as a member of parliament
- Harivansh Rai Bachchan (1907–2003) poet and professor of Allahabad University, best known for his early work Madhushala; father of Bollywood star Amitabh Bachchan
- Raghuraj Pratap Singh (born 1969) known as Raja Bhaiya, politician, independent member of legislative assembly and MLA of Pratapgarh district Uttar Pradesh
- Anupam Shyam Ojha (1957–2021), film and television actor, who usually played villainous role on international films set in India
- Babulal Gaur (born 1930) BJP Leader and Ex. Chief Minister of Madhya Pradesh also hails from Pratapgarh.
- Shweta Tiwari (born 1980), Bollywood and Bhojpuri film actress and winner of the fourth season of the reality show Bigg Boss
- Rajkumari Ratna Singh (born 1959), politician from Indian National Congress Party, member of parliament.
- Pramod Tiwari (born 1956), senior leader of Congress Party and EX MLA from (Rampur Khas), and current MP of Rajya Sabh Pratapgarh, Uttar Pradesh.
- Lal Pratap Singh freedom fighter
- Ajit Pratap Singh, ex-royal and politician
- Sumitranandan Pant, poet

== See also ==
- Munishwar Dutt Upadhyay
- Harivansh Rai Bachchan
- Harshpur
