= Katra Gulab Singh =

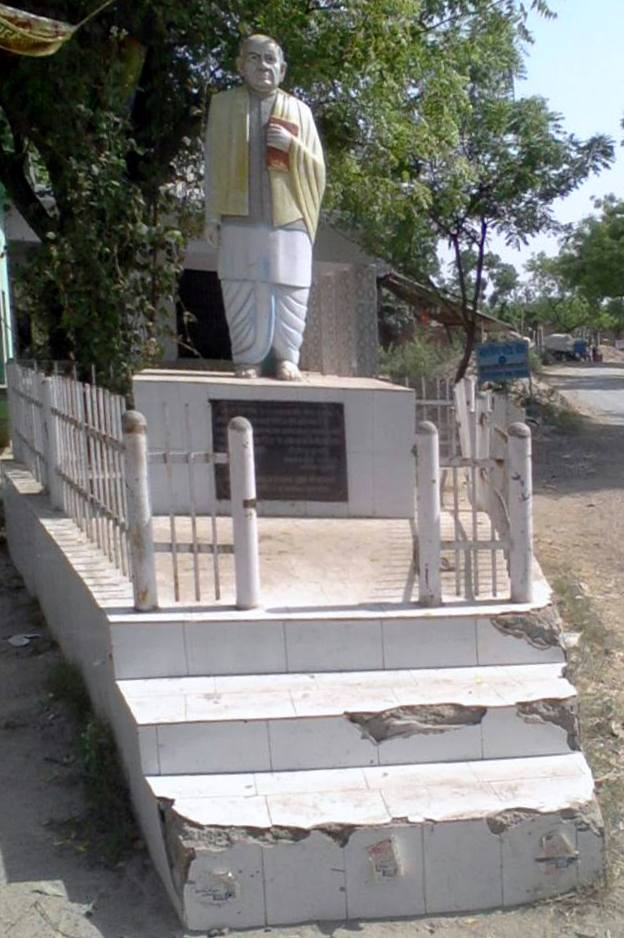
- Sardar Patel's statue at Sardar Vallabhbhai Patel Chowk in Katra Gulab Singh, Pratapgarh

- Location of Katra Gulab Singh in Uttar Pradesh Katra Gulab Singh (India)
- Coordinates: 25.9161°N 81.86074°E
- Country: India
- State: Uttar Pradesh
- District: Pratapgarh

Government
  - Type: Nagar Panchayat
  - Chairman: Ashok Kumar Yadav alias Munna
  - Member (9- Katra Gulab Singh Bajar): Geeta Jaiswal
- Elevation: 110 m (360 ft)
- Time zone: UTC+5:30 (Indian Standard Time)
- Postal Code: 230402
- Telephone Code: 05342
- Vehicle Registration: UP 72
- Website: Katra Gulab Singh

Katra Gulab Singh is a regional market town in Pratapgarh district of Uttar Pradesh state of India. It is about 30 km (19 mi) away from the Pratapgarh headquarters.

== History ==
In the Indian Mutiny of 1857, protestors honored Amar Shaheed Babu Gulab Singh. This is reflected in the yearly festival known as War Citaon. Allahabad from Lucknow for the Suppression of the British soldiers were revolutionaries. Then, with his private army, Bakulai killed many Englishmen in Mandhata near the village of Katra Gulab Singh. The British army was forced to retreat. Babu Gulab Singh was injured when he encountered British soldiers.

== Geography ==
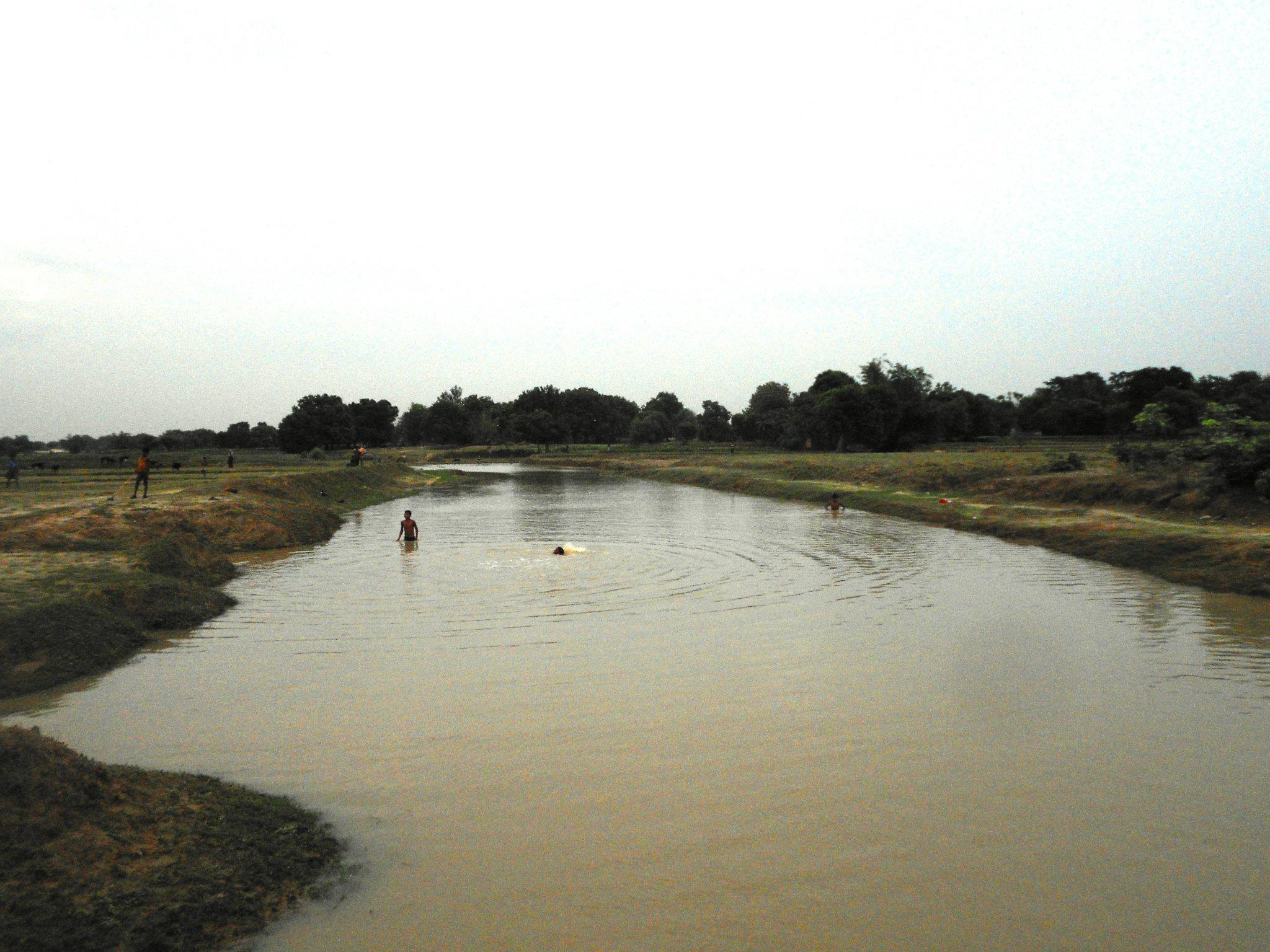
Bakulahi River flows through Katra Gulab Singh, Pratapgarh.

Katra Gulab Singh is located at 25.9161°N 81.86074°E. The town is situated on the bank of the Bakulahi River.

== Education institutes ==
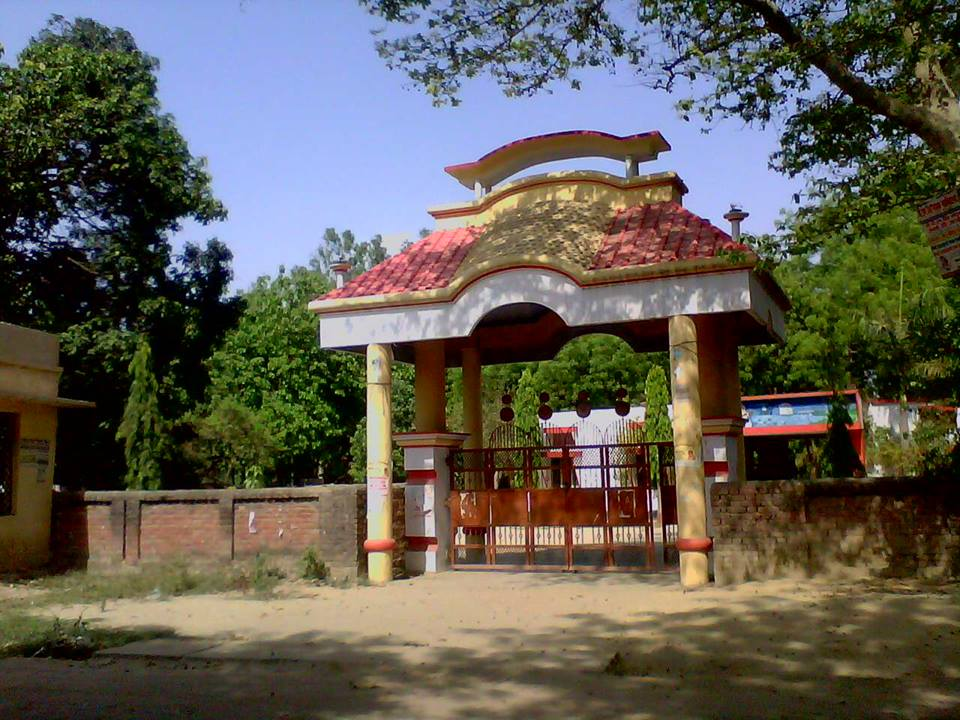
Amar Janta Intermediate College, Katra Gulab Singh, Pratapgarh

- Model UPS Katra Gulab Singh
- Hind Convent Public School
- Jauhar Modern English School
- A.T.S. Academy
- Saraswati Vidya Mandir
- Saray Bhoopati Primary School
- Bhimrao Ambedkar High School and College, Tarual
- Shri om Sai Computer Education and Training Center
- Sri Sri Ravi Sankar Gyan Mandir (Library)
- S P PUBLIC SCHOOL CHHITAHI KATRA GULAB SINGH PRATAPGARH
- S P ITI & LAW COLLEGE CHHITAHI KATRA GULAB SINGH PRATAPGARH

== Transport ==
Katra Gulab Singh is connected by road with Allahabad, Lucknow, Kanpur, Delhi, and many more North Indian cities. The nearest railway station is 12 km (7.5 mi) away in Mau Aima.

== See also ==
- Bakulahi Bridge
- Mandhata, Uttar Pradesh
- Sardar Vallabhbhai Patel Chowk
- Vishwanathganj

== Gallery ==
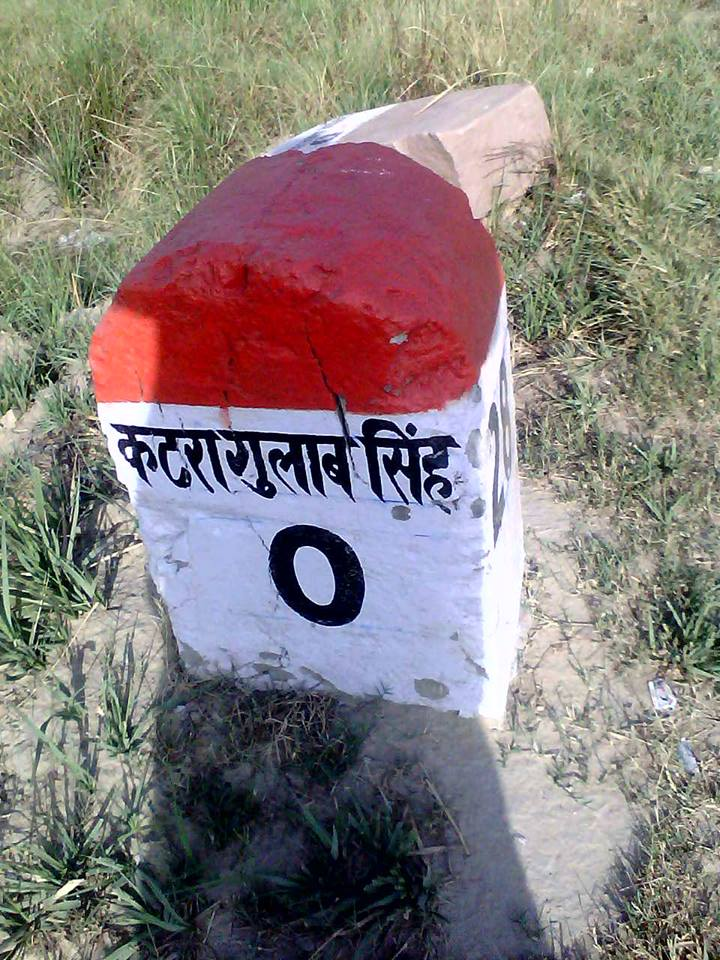
Milestone shows distance about Katra Gulab Singh

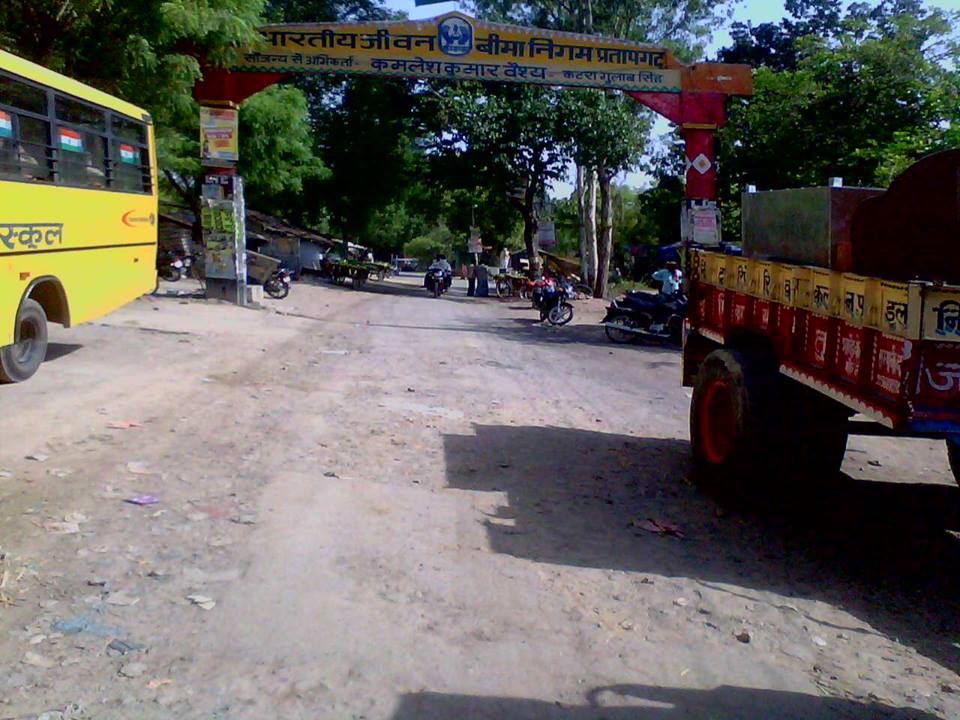
An entrance to Katra Gulab Singh.

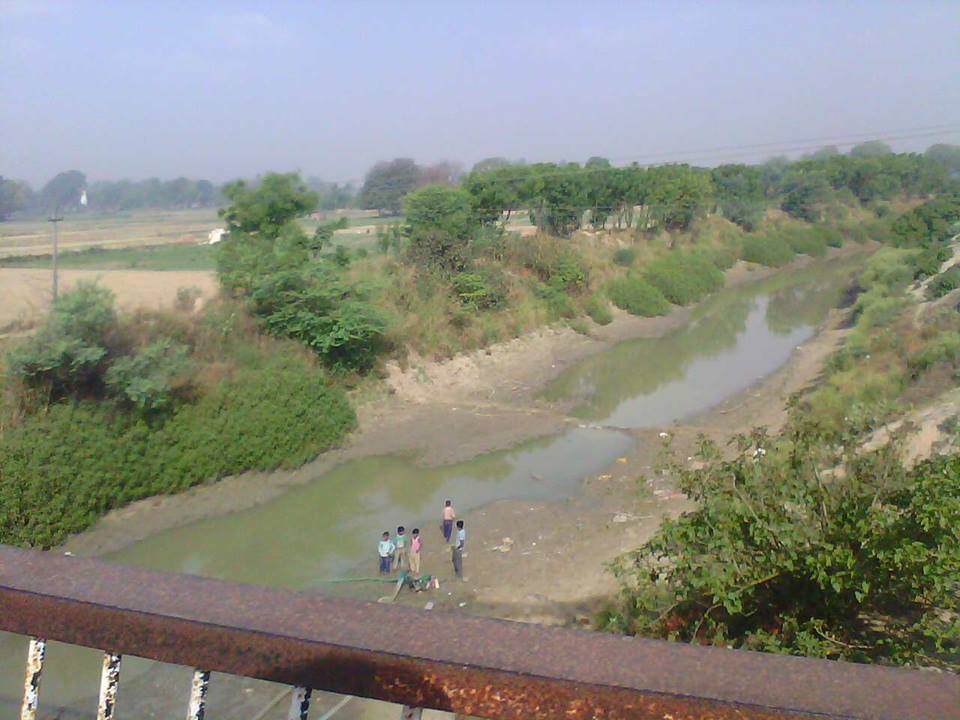
Bakulahi River, Katra Gulab Singh

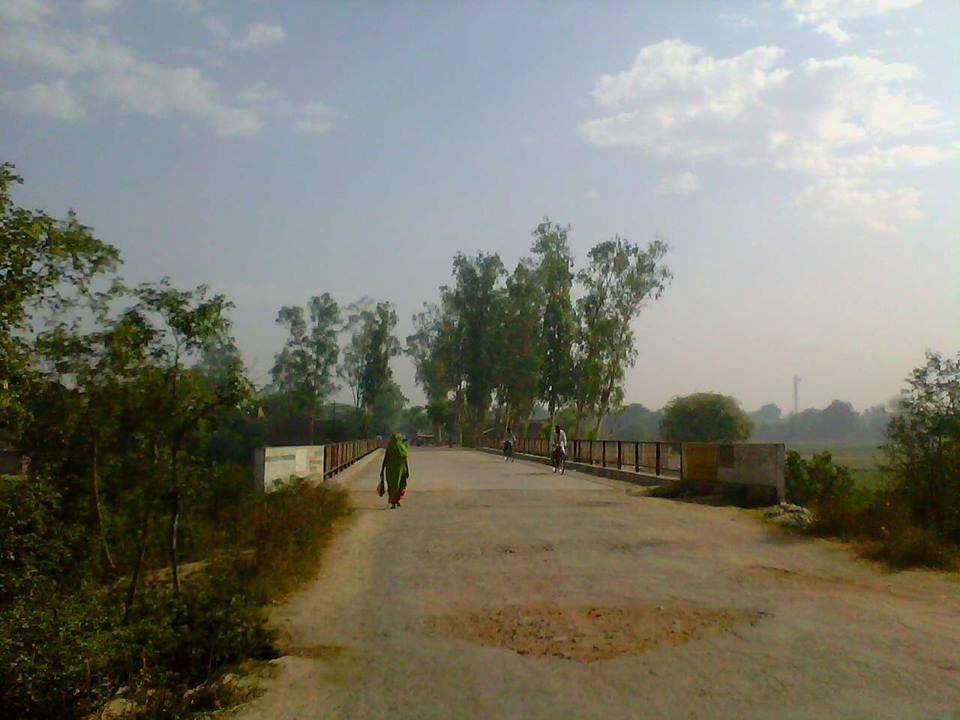
Bakulahi Bridge, Katra Gulab Singh
