= Vallabhbhai =

Vallabhbhai is an Indian masculine given name that may refer to:

- Vallabhbhai Kakadiya (born 1944), Indian politician
- Vallabhbhai Kathiria (born 1954), Indian politician
- Dahyabhai Vallabhbhai Patel (born 1945), Indian politician
- Sardar Vallabhbhai Patel (1875–1950), Deputy Prime Minister of India
  - Sardar Vallabhbhai Patel Chowk
  - Sardar Vallabhbhai Patel National Memorial
  - Sardar Vallabhbhai Patel International Airport
  - Sardar Vallabhbhai Patel Indoor Stadium
  - Sardar Patel Stadium, Motera
  - Sardar Vallabhbhai Patel Stadium, Navrangpura
  - Sardar Vallabhbhai Patel Stadium, Valsad
  - Sardar Vallabhbhai Patel International Hockey Stadium
  - Sardar Vallabhbhai National Institute of Technology, Surat
  - Sardar Vallabhbhai Patel International School of Textiles & Management
  - Sardar Vallabhbhai Patel Police Museum
  - Sardar Vallabhbhai Patel National Police Academy
  - Vallabhbhai Patel Chest Institute
