= Shailendra Kumar =

Indian politician

Member of Parliament, Lok Sabha
- In office 2009–2014
- Preceded by: Constituency established
- Succeeded by: Vinod Sonkar
- Constituency: Kaushambi
- In office 2004–2009
- Preceded by: Suresh Pasi
- Succeeded by: Constituency abolished
- Constituency: Chail
- In office 1998–1999
- Preceded by: Amrit Lal Bharti
- Succeeded by: Suresh Pasi
- Constituency: Chail

Member of the Uttar Pradesh Legislative Assembly
- In office 1985–1991
- Preceded by: Vijay Prakash
- Succeeded by: Dinesh Chandra Sonkar
- Constituency: Chail

Personal details
- Born: 25 July 1960 (age 66) Allahabad, Uttar Pradesh, India
- Party: Indian National Congress; Samajwadi Party; Jansatta Dal (Loktantrik) (2018–)
- Spouse: Usha Shailendra
- Children: 1 son, Shivanku Bhatt, and 2 daughters
- Parents: Dharmavir (father); Indra Devi (mother)
- Relatives: Satyaveer Munna (brother)
- As of 12 March 2010

Shailendra Kumar Pasi (born 25 July 1960) is an Indian politician belonging to the Jansatta Dal (Loktantrik). He was three times member of Lok Sabha from the Kaushambi constituency (2009–2014) & Chail constituency (1998–99) & (2004–2009) in Uttar Pradesh from the Samajwadi Party. He has been a Member of the Legislative Assembly (MLA) twice from Congress.

Furthermore, he is the son of former Union Minister of State in the Fourth Indira Gandhi ministry and senior Indian National Congress leader late Dharmavir and elder brother of ex-MLA for Soraon, Satyaveer Munna.
