= Unchdeeh =

Unchdeeh, Prayagraj Unchdeeh
- Village
- Location in Uttar Pradesh, India Unchdeeh, Prayagraj (India)
- Coordinates: 25.25137°N 82.12534°E
- Country: India
- State: Uttar Pradesh
- District: Prayagraj

Languages
  - Official: Hindi, Awadhi
- Time zone: UTC+5:30 (IST)

Unchdeeh is a village in Holagarh Mandal, Prayagraj district, Uttar Pradesh, India. Unchdeeh is located 32.4 km distance from its District Main City Prayagraj. It is located 151 km distance from its State Main City Lucknow.

Other villages in Holagarh Mandal are Holagarh, Akodhi, Aruwahw, Babhanpur Urf Kalyanpur, Baherpur and Bajha.

Nearby villages are Baladih (1.3 km), Siswan (2.6 km), Kalyanpur (2.6 km), Umariasari (2.7 km), Umaria Badal Urf Gainda (3.2 km).

Towns nearby include Holagarh, Mauaima (13 km), Soraon (13.7 km), Bahria (21.7 km) and Katra Gulab Singh (2 km).
