= Hathigahan =

Village in Uttar Pradesh, India

Hathigahan is a village situated in Prayagraj, Uttar Pradesh, India. The village is about 17 km from the district headquarters on Prayagraj-Lucknow connectivity. Hathigahan comes under the Soraon tahsil and the Kaurihar block. Hathigahan has a population of about 50,000.

== Occupation ==
The most prevailing and prevalent industry in Hathigahan is farming. The Farming industry in Hathigahan employs most of the people in town; predominantly vegetables are grown in Hathigahan. As the village is situated in the flood plain of Ganga, it is quite fertile. Due to excess of vegetable production in the village many markets have emerged in and around the village. Because of this the farming is more of commercial in nature.

== Main Spots ==
=== Chauraha ===
Hathigahan chauraha is the place at which roads from Rampur and Muhammadpur meet the Lucknow-Allahabad main road. This is the main market in the whole village.

=== Shiv Mandir ===
Shiv mandir is the central hall of the village where most of the gatherings of the village take place. Also Panchayat Bhavan is situated near this at which panchayat related work is performed. Co-operative society is also near this.
