= Rekha Mishra =

Indian police officer (born 1986)

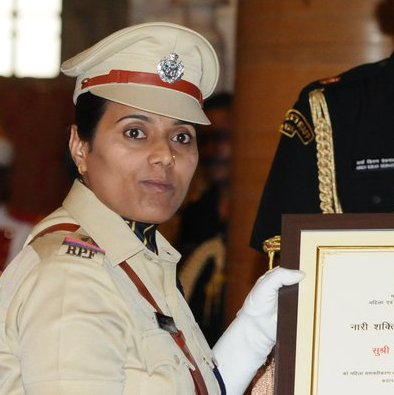
- Born: 1986 (age 39–40); Kanjia Village Kaurihar, Allahabad, Uttar Pradesh
- Occupation: Sub-Inspector
- Employer: Railway Protection Force
- Known for: rescuing children who run away to Mumbai
- Parent(s): Surendra Narayan Mishra; Kamala Mishra

Rekha Mishra (born c. 1986) is an Indian police officer from Railway Protection Force(RPF) who was recognised for finding hundreds of lost children. She was awarded the Nari Shakti Puraskar in 2018.

== Life ==
Mishra was born in about 1986. Her military family comes from Kanjia village of Kaurihar block of District Prayagraj Allabahad in Uttar Pradesh. Her father Surendra Narayan Mishra is retired from Indian Army and her two brothers are also serving in Indian Army. Her Grandfather Surya Narayan Mishra was a freedom fighter.

She joined the Railway Protection Force(RPF) in 2014 and she was posted to the Chhatrapati Shivaji Railway Terminus. As a sub-inspector, she and her colleagues developed expertise in identifying children who arrived at the station after running away from home. By 2018 she had identified and assisted hundreds of children who had travelled to Mumbai, many of whom had come to the city hoping to meet Bollywood actors or individuals they had connected with on Facebook.

On International Women's Day in 2018 Jain was given the Nari Shakti Puraskar at the Presidential Palace (Rastrapati Bhavan) in New Delhi by the President of India Ram Nath Kovind. The ceremony was attended by the Minister for Women & Child Development, Maneka Sanjay Gandhi and the Prime Minister of India, Narendra Modi. About thirty people were recognised that day, receiving the award and a prize of 100,000 rand. After Mishta was awarded the Nari Shakti Puraskar and 100,000 Rand donated the money to the NGO Childline who rescue and care for lost and troubled children. She argued that the charity needed the money more than she did. Her work was also used as an exemplar in school text books in Maharashtra for year 10 students. The book illustrates what can happen to children who run away.
