= Jamuna Prasad =

Indian politician

Dr. Jamuna Prasad Saroj

MLA, 17th Legislative Assembly
- In office 2017–2022
- Preceded by: Satyaveer Munna
- Succeeded by: Geeta Shastri
- Constituency: Soraon

Personal details
- Party: Apna Dal (Sonelal)
- Occupation: MLA
- Profession: Politician

Dr. Jamuna Prasad Saroj is an Indian politician and a member of 17th Legislative Assembly of Soraon, Uttar Pradesh of India. He represents the Soraon constituency of Uttar Pradesh and is a member of the Apna Dal (Sonelal) party.

== Political career ==
Dr. Jamuna Prasad Saroj has been a member of the 17th Legislative Assembly of Uttar Pradesh. Since 2017, he has represented the Soraon constituency and is a member of the AD(S).

== Posts held ==
| # | From | To | Position | Comments |
|---|---|---|---|---|
| 01 | 2017 | Incumbent | Member, 17th Legislative Assembly | |

== See also ==
- Uttar Pradesh Legislative Assembly
