= Bakulahi Bridge =

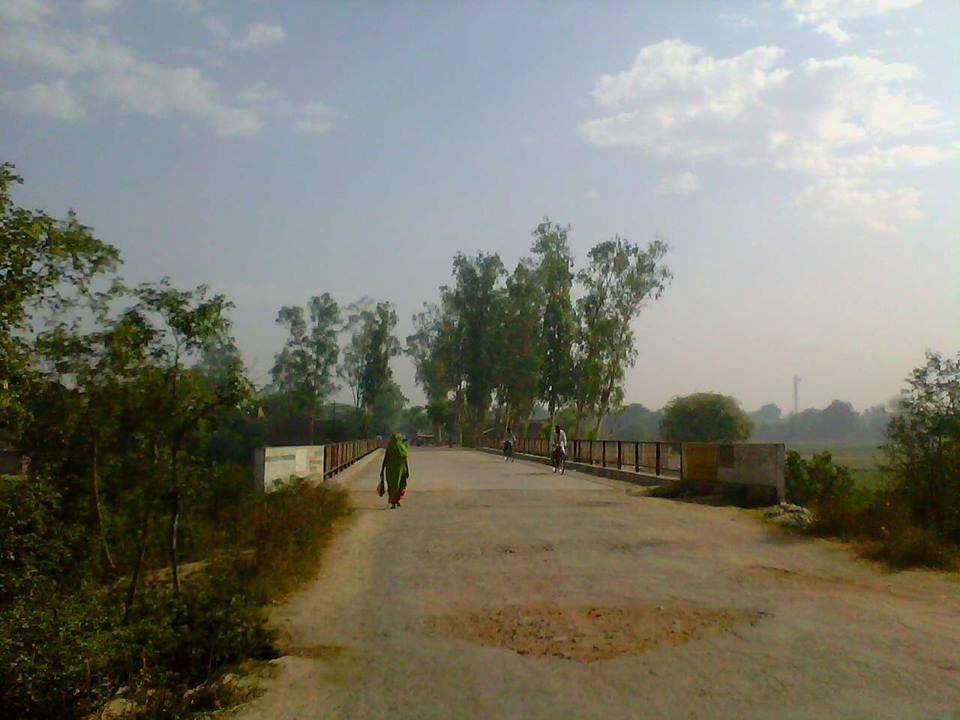
- Bakulahi Bridge at Katra Gulab Singh
- Coordinates: 25.9161°N 81.86074°E
- Carries: Motor vehicles
- Crosses: Katra Gulab Singh and Kalyanpur
- Locale: Katra Gulab Singh, Pratapgarh; Kalyanpur, Allahabad
- Official name: Bakulahi Setu
- Other name(s): Bakulahi Pull

Characteristics
- Total length: 4x13.80

History
- Constructed by: Government of Uttar Pradesh
- Opened: 1989

The Bakulahi Bridge in Katra Gulab Singh, also known as Bakulahi Pull or Bakulahi Pull Chungi, is a bridge, built across the Katra Gulab Singh that connects the two district, Pratapgarh to Allahabad of Indian state Uttar Pradesh. This bridge was built in 1989.

== Gallery ==
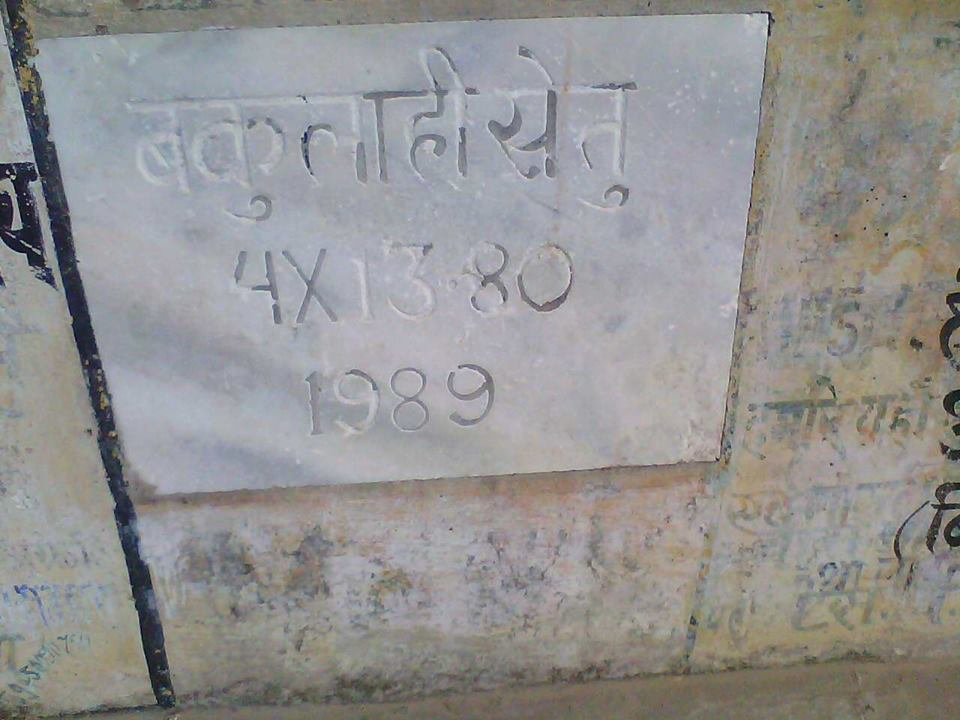
Bakulahi Bridge Katra Gulab Singh

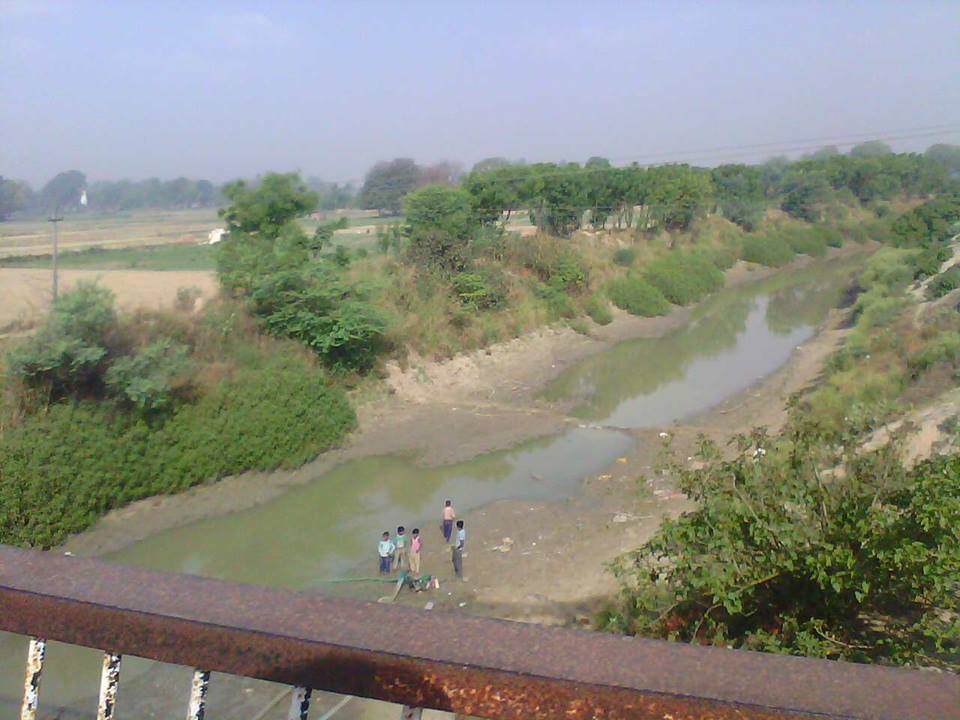
Bakulahi River, Katra Gulab Singh

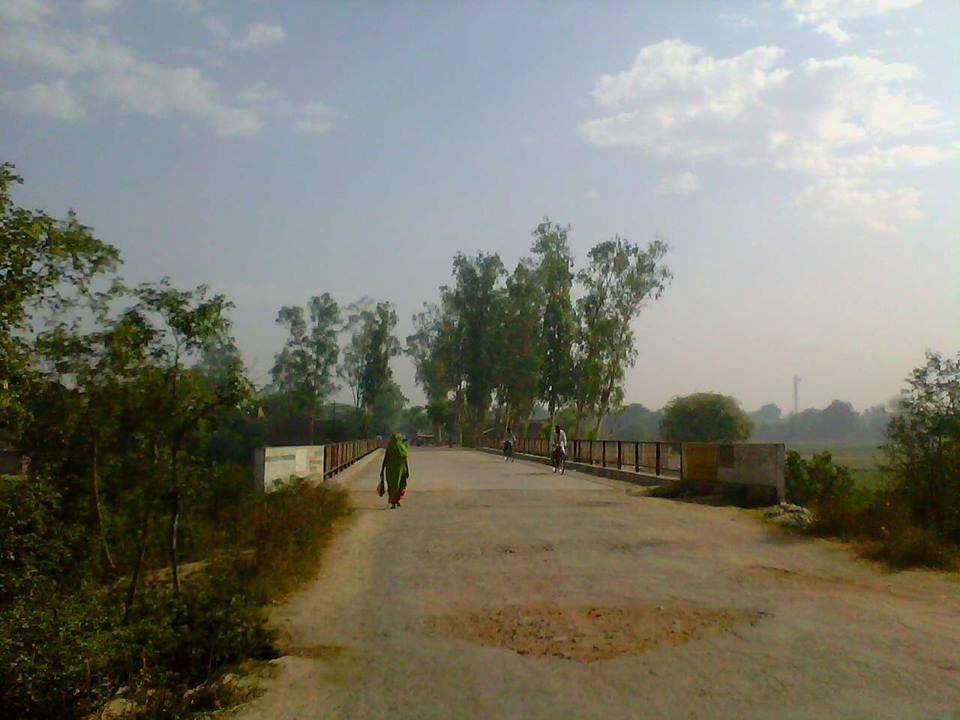
Bakulahi Bridge, Katra Gulab Singh
