= Shringverpur =

Shringverpur Shringwarepur, Shringaverpur
- City
- Nickname: Singaraur
- Location in Uttar Pradesh, India Shringverpur (India)
- Coordinates: 25.587253°N 81.641804°E
- Country: India
- State: Uttar Pradesh
- District: Prayagraj
- Tehsil: Soraon
- Named for: Spiritual Saint Shringi Rishis

Languages
  - Official: Hindi
- Time zone: UTC+5:30 (IST)
- Postal code: 229411

Shringaverpur, also spelt Singraur, is a village in the Indian state of Uttar Pradesh.

== Culture ==
According to Hindu folklore, the deity Rama crossed the river Ganges at Shringaverpur on his way to exile along with Sita and Lakshmana. Shringverpur is mentioned in the ancient Hindu epic Ramayana, where it is described as the capital of the Kingdom of Nishadraj (King of Fishermen). "Sita, Ram and his brother came to Shringverpur" can be found within.

The Ramayana mentions that Rama, his brother Lakshmana and wife Sita, stayed for a night in the village before leaving for forest exile.

== History ==
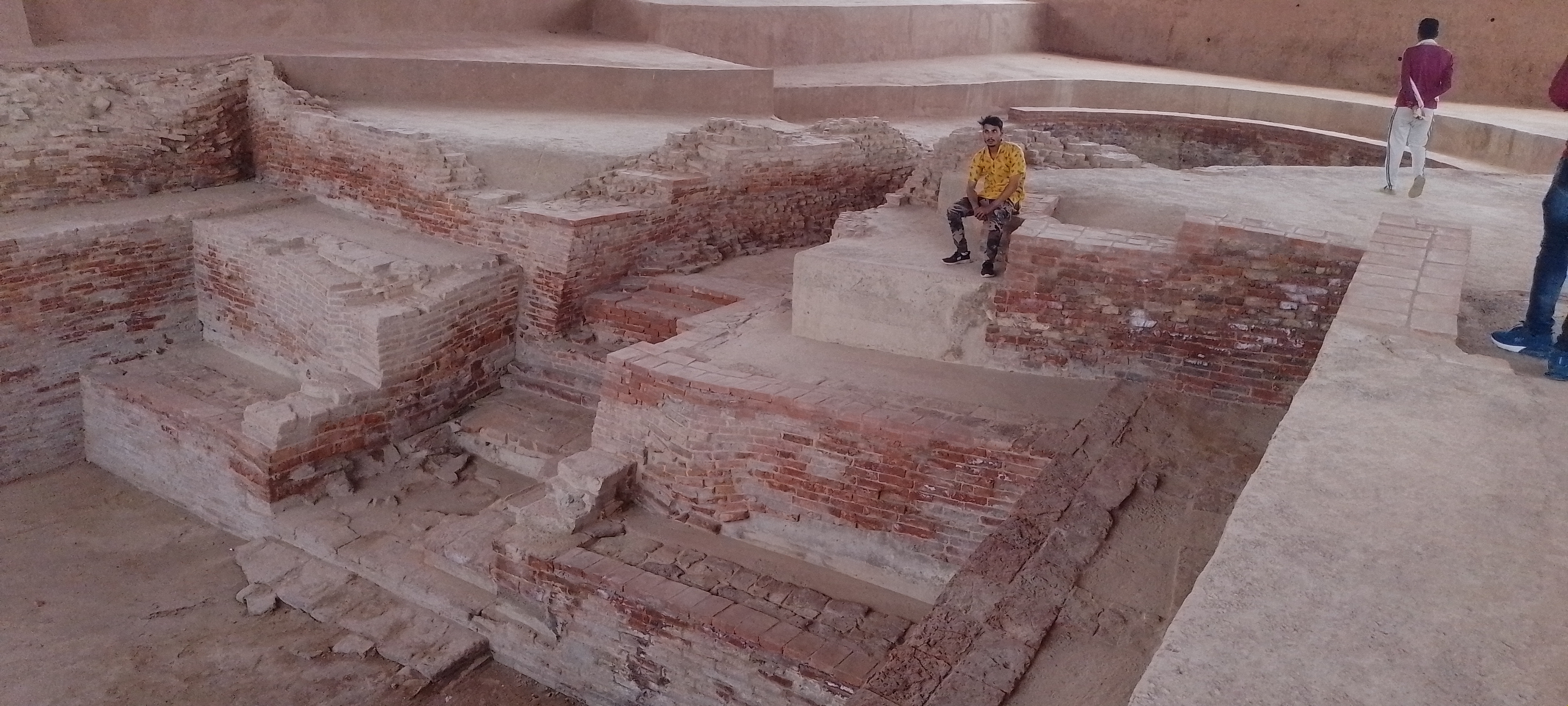
Excavation of Ancient Sringverpur, Kingdom Of Nishad Raaj.

Excavations at Shringverpur unearthed the temple of Shringi Rishi. The village may have taken its name from those sages. During the Mughal period, the Singraur group was formed to face the chaotic forces by the Kshatriyas, including clans of Sengar and Gaharwar Brahmakshatriya Kshatriya.

A small temple was built on the site where Nishadraja Ram is said to have worshipped Shivling.

The village has several ruined walls and structures.

In 2019, Uttar Pradesh Government divided the Kaurihar block of Soraon Tehsil and created a new block Shringverpur Dham.

== Infrastructure ==
A large old hydraulic system is in the village. A cremation centre is set on the riverbank. People from across Uttar Pradesh come to Shringaverpur for cremation.

== Gallery ==
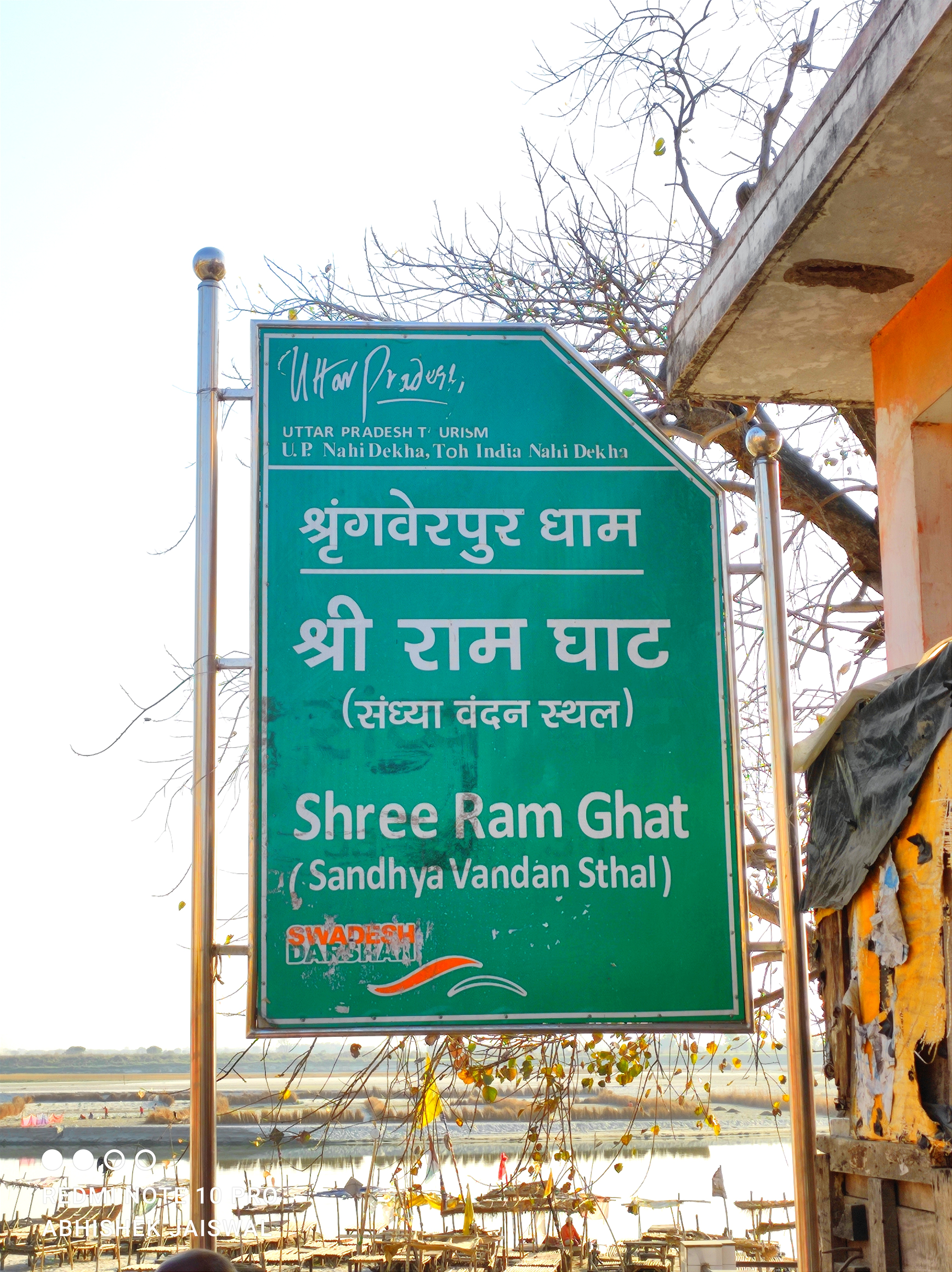
Shri ramghat shringverpur

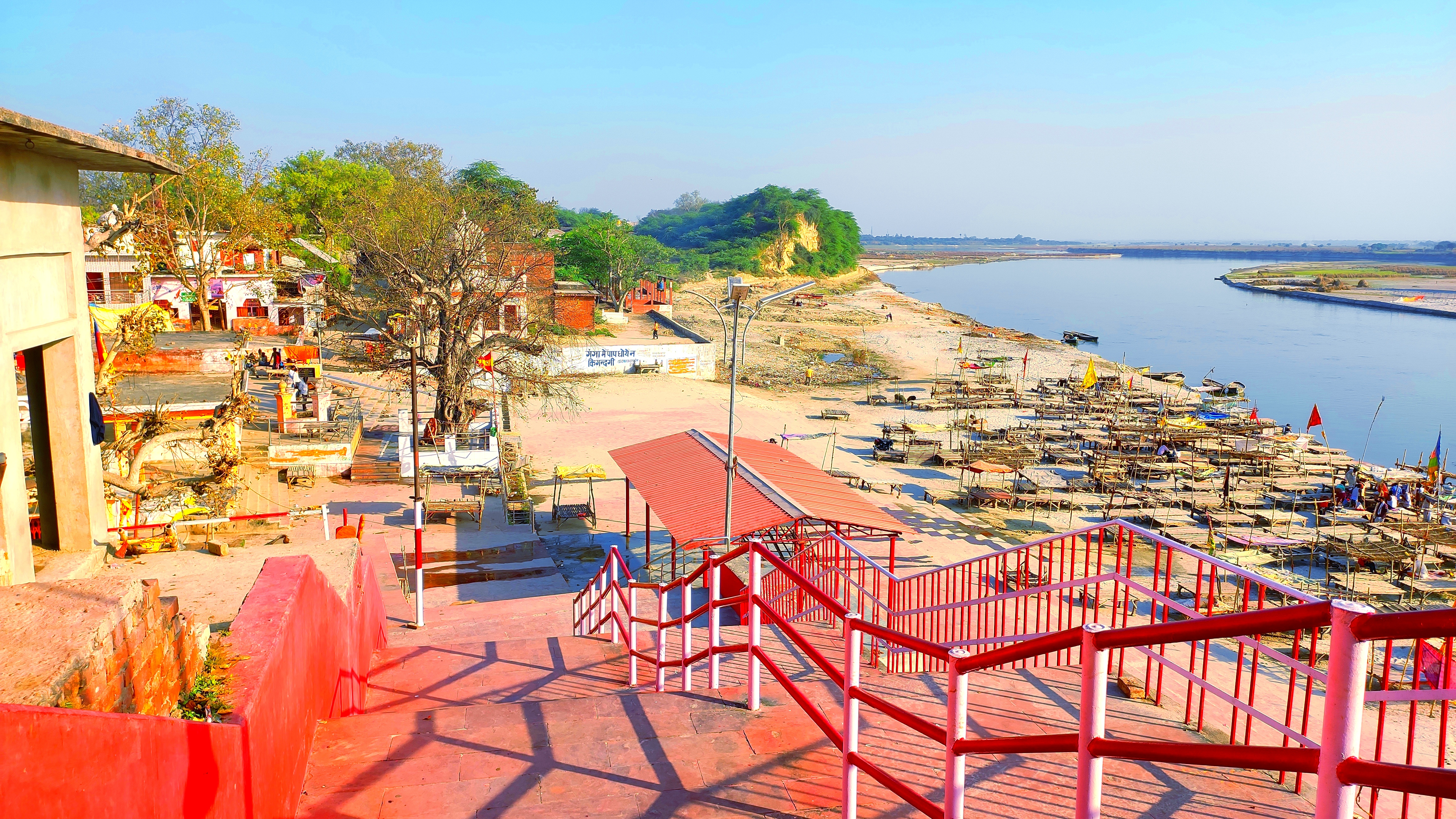
Shringverpur ganga ghat

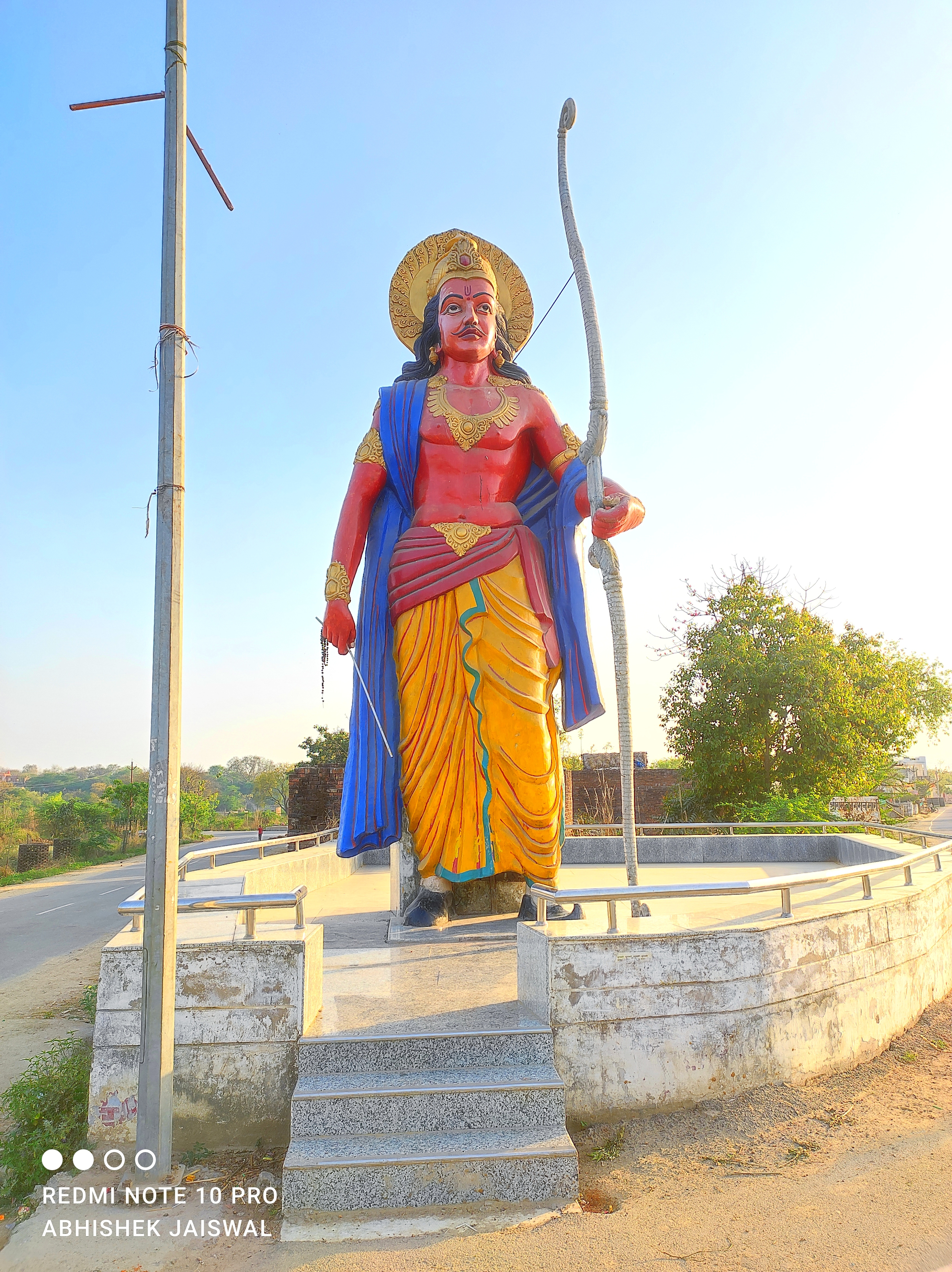
Nishadraj statue in shringverpur

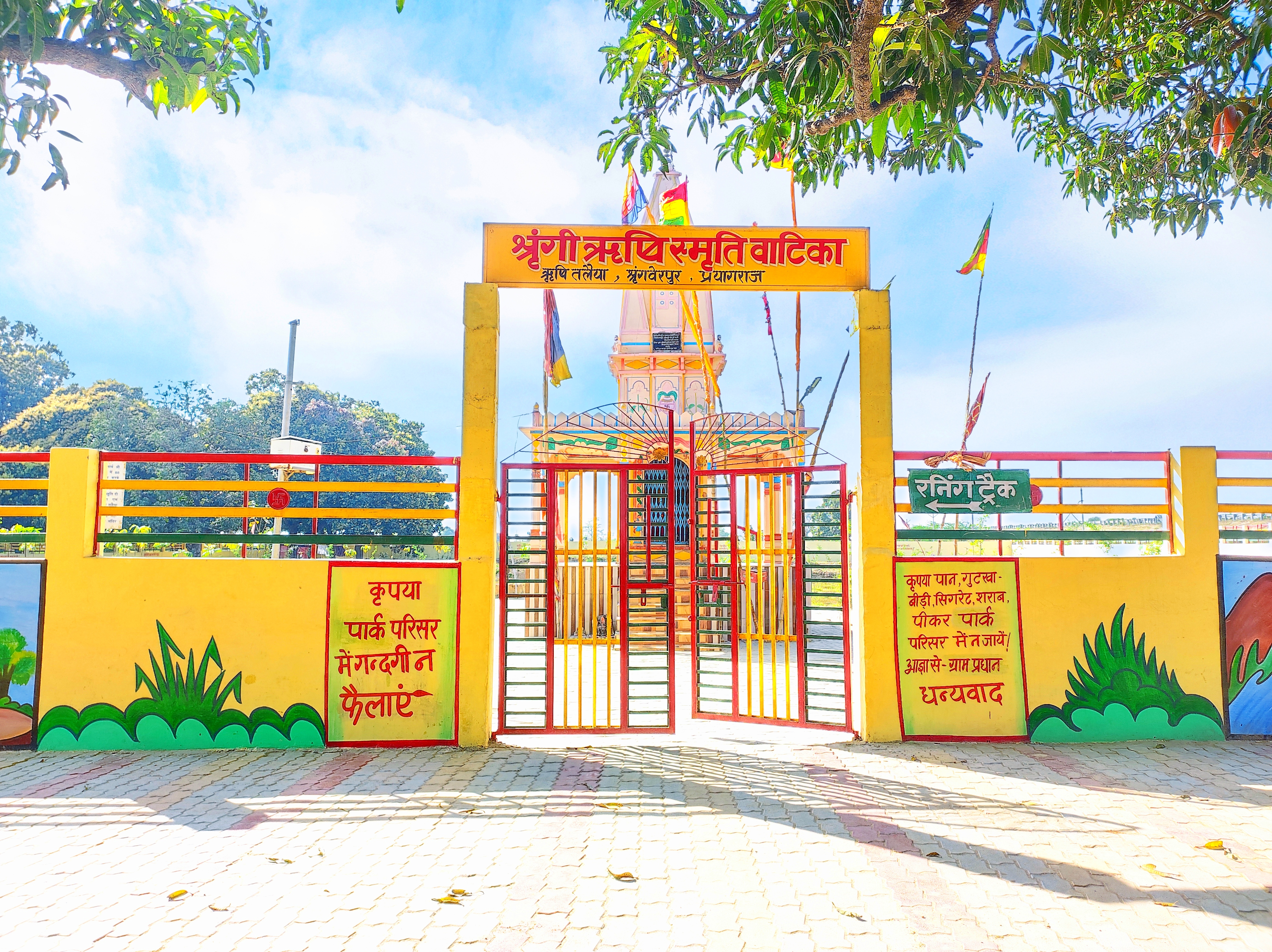
Shringi rishi smriti vatika

== Geography ==
The village is on the Ganges riverbank, 45 kilometres (28 mi) from Prayagraj.

Lalgopalganj, a nearby nagar panchayat located about 5 km north of Shringverpur, serves as the nearest urban centre. It is situated along the Prayagraj–Lucknow corridor and provides access to Shringverpur through local roads. The nearest railway station is Lalgopalganj railway station, which connects the area to Prayagraj and other nearby towns.
