= Soraon =

Soraon Soram Padaav
- Town (Tehsil)
- Location in India Soraon (India)
- Coordinates: 25.37°N 81.51°E
- Country: India
- State: Uttar Pradesh
- District: Prayagraj

Government
  - MLA: Geeta Shastri (Samajwadi Party)

Population (2011)
  - Total: 10,624

Languages- Hindi, Awadhi
- Time zone: UTC+5:30 (IST)
- Vehicle registration: UP-70
- Sex ratio: 1000:1014 ♂/♀
- Website: up.gov.in

Soraon is a town and tehsil in Prayagraj district in the Indian state of Uttar Pradesh. It is located in the northern part of Prayagraj district and serves as the administrative headquarters of Soraon tehsil.

Soraon tehsil is one of the administrative subdivisions of Prayagraj district. According to the 2011 Census of India, Soraon was classified as a census town and had the census code 161173. The Soraon sub-district had several towns and villages, including Mau Aima, Lal Gopalganj Nindaura and Soraon."Soraon". District Prayagraj, Government of Uttar Pradesh."Primary Census Abstract: District Allahabad, Uttar Pradesh". Office of the Registrar General & Census Commissioner, India.

Administratively, Soraon tehsil currently comprises the development blocks of Kaurihar, Holagarh, Mauaima, Soraon, Shringverpur Dham and Bhagwatpur, and contains 452 villages."Tehsil". District Prayagraj, Government of Uttar Pradesh.

Soraon is situated within the wider cultural and historical region of the Prayagraj area. The Ganges and its associated riverine plains have played an important role in the settlement and agriculture of the surrounding region.

== History ==
The Soraon region has historical and archaeological associations with the ancient settlement of Shringverpur (Sringverpura). The site, located in Soraon tehsil, is identified with the ancient settlement traditionally associated with Nishadraj in the Ramayana. The Archaeological Survey of India lists the ancient site of Singraur (Sringverpura) in Soraon tehsil among its protected archaeological sites.

The wider area forms part of the historical landscape of Prayagraj, an important centre of religious, cultural and political history in the Ganga-Yamuna region.

== Politics ==
Soraon is also constituency of former Prime Minister of India Vishwanath Pratap Singh. He got elected as INC MLA in Uttar Pradesh Vidhan Sabha Election 1969 beating Ram Adhar Pande of Samyukta Socialist Party by 1088 votes. Satyaveer Munna. After being declared as reserve constituency in 2009 he got elected for the first time from reserve constituency Soraon as SP MLA in Uttar Pradesh Vidhan Sabha Election 2012 beating Babulal Bhawara of Bahujan Samaj Party by over 14000 votes.Also In 2019 BJP Candidate Alok Kumar Pandey Elected As Block Pramukh Of Soraon By Beating Sandeep Yadav Of SP.

== Transport ==
Soraon is connected to the road network of Prayagraj district. The Ganga Expressway, a 594-kilometre access-controlled expressway connecting Meerut with Prayagraj, terminates at Soraon near the Prayagraj Bypass on National Highway 330A. The Soraon terminal provides connectivity between the expressway and Prayagraj and surrounding areas.
