= Amrit Lal Bharti =

Indian politician

Member of Parliament, Lok Sabha
- In office 1996-1998
- Preceded by: Shashi Prakash
- Succeeded by: Shailendra Kumar
- Constituency: Chail (Uttar Pradesh)

Personal details
- Born: 3 November 1941 (age 84) Deorakh, Allahabad District, United Provinces, British India (now in Uttar Pradesh), India)
- Party: Bharatiya Janata Party
- Spouse: Kusum Kumari

Amrit Lal Bharti (born 3 November 1941) is an Indian politician. He was elected to the Lok Sabha the lower house of Indian Parliament from Chail in Uttar Pradesh as a member of the Bharatiya Janata Party.
