= Shivanku Bhatt =

Indian model and actor

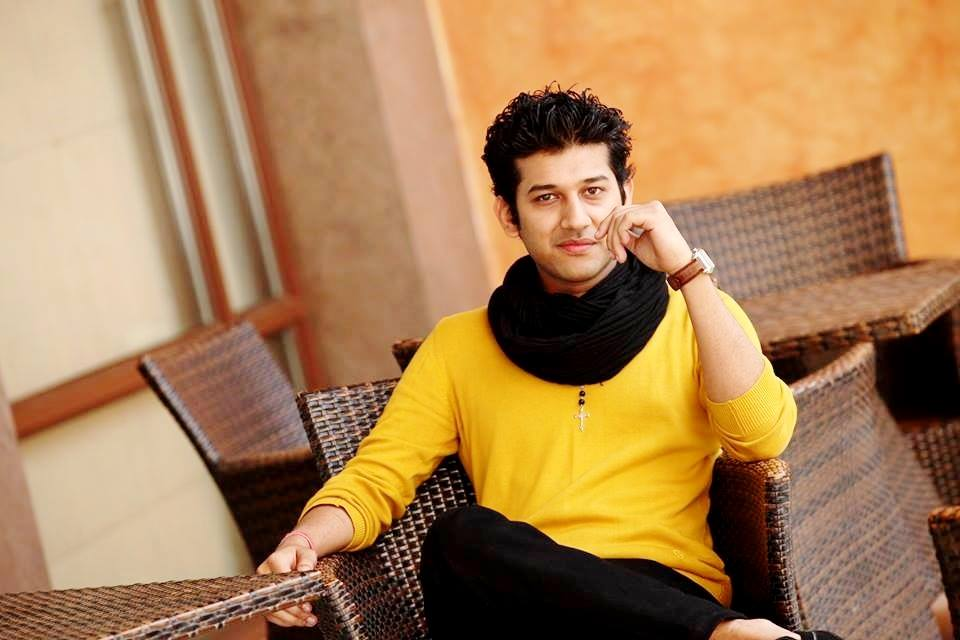
- Born: Shivanku Bhatt; Dehradun, India
- Occupations: Model, Actor
- Years active: 2014–present

Shivanku Bhatt born on 6 June is an Indian model and actor who won the title of Mr. India Worldwide in 2014.

== Early life ==
Born in Dehradun to a traditional Garhwali family, Shivanku originally hails from Pauri, Uttarakhand. He is the youngest child of Madhu and Shailendra Kumar Bhatt. With his mother being an active social worker and having served as the vice-chairperson in the Badrinath-Kedarnath Temple Committee and presently serving as Vice-Chairman of the Council for Art, Culture & Littereature in Government of Uttarakhand Shivanku was raised in a spiritually and ethically sound household. His father works as a Forest Officer with the Uttarakhand Government.

Bhatt completed his academics in Law from the University of Petroleum Studies, Dehradun. However, being progressive in their temperament, his parents never wrote off his ambitions for acting and have always supported him in his endeavours. Since his college days itself, Shivanku has been an anchor for a number of corporate, entertainment and Bollywood events.

Shivanku joined the modeling industry right before his appearance in the beauty pageant, which he won to his name. Aside from modeling, Shivanku also serves as a Legal Consultant with a department in the Uttarakhand Government.

== Career ==
He is an Indian model and the winner of the renowned male beauty pageant – Mr. India Worldwide for the year 2014.

Shivanku has also been a part of the jury for the female beauty pageant title – Ms. North India (2014). Recently, he was also featured in a Kumaoni folk album - 'Sun le Dagadia’, released by Mumbai-based Anmol Productions.
