= Satyaveer Munna =

Indian politician

Member of the Uttar Pradesh Legislative Assembly
- In office March 2012 - March 2017
- Preceded by: Mohd. Muztaba Siddiqi
- Succeeded by: Jamuna Prasad
- Constituency: Soraon

Personal details
- Born: 3 June 1972 (age 54)
- Party: Samajwadi Party
- Spouse: Madhu Veer (m.2003)
- Children: 1 son and 1 daughter
- Parents: Dharmavir (father); Indra Devi (mother)
- Relatives: Shailendra Kumar (brother)

Satyaveer Munna (born 3 June 1972) is an Indian politician, Member of Legislative Assembly (MLA) of Soraon, Uttar Pradesh, affiliated with Samajwadi Party. He is son of former Union Minister of State in the Fourth Indira Gandhi ministry and senior Indian National Congress leader late Dharmavir and brother of three times MP Shailendra Kumar.

In 2012, he was elected as MLA for Soraon defeating Bahujan Samaj Party's former minister Babulal Bhawra.

== Personal life ==
Satyaveer married in 2003 to Smt. Madhu Veer and the couple has a daughter Vedanshi born in 2005 and a son Vedant Aryan born in 2010.
