= Chail Lok Sabha constituency =

Former constituency in Uttar Pradesh, India

Coordinates: 25.4°N 81.6°E

Chail
- Former Lok Sabha constituency

Constituency details
- Country: India
- Region: North India
- State: Uttar Pradesh
- Established: 1962
- Abolished: 2008

Chail was a Lok Sabha constituency in Uttar Pradesh, India.

== Members of Parliament ==
Year	Member	Party
1962	Masuriya Din	Indian National Congress
1967	Masuriya Din	Indian National Congress
1971	Chhotey Lal	Bharatiya Jana Sangh
1977	Ram Nihore Rakesh	Janata Party
1980	Ram Nihore Rakesh	Indian National Congress (I)
1984	Bihari Lal Shailesh	Indian National Congress
1989	Ram Nihore Rakesh	Indian National Congress
1991	Shashi Prakash	Janata Dal
1996	Amrit Lal Bharti	Bharatiya Janata Party
1998	Shailendra Kumar	Samajwadi Party
1999	Suresh Pasi	Bahujan Samaj Party
2004	Shailendra Kumar	Samajwadi Party
2008 onwards : See Kaushambi

== See also ==
- Kaushambi district
- List of constituencies of the Lok Sabha
