= Ram Nihore Rakesh =

Indian politician

Member of Parliament, Lok Sabha
- In office 1977-1984
- Preceded by: Chhotey Lal
- Succeeded by: B. L. Shailesh
- In office 1989-1991
- Preceded by: B. L. Shailesh
- Succeeded by: Shashi Prakash
- Constituency: Chail (Uttar Pradesh)

Personal details
- Born: 3 May 1943 (age 82) Maharajpur, Allahabad District, United Provinces, British India (present-day Uttar Pradesh, India)
- Party: Indian National Congress
- Spouse: Laxmi Prabha Rakesh
- Children: Rajesh Rakesh, Vimlesh Rakesh, Ritesh Rakesh, Archana Rakesh, Vinod Rakesh

Ram Nihore Rakesh is an Indian politician. He was elected to the Lok Sabha the lower house of Indian Parliament from Chail in Uttar Pradesh as a member of the Indian National Congress.
