= Geeta Shastri =

Indian politician

Member of Uttar Pradesh Legislative Assembly
- Incumbent
- Assumed office 2022
- Preceded by: Jamuna Prasad
- Constituency: Soraon

Personal details
- Born: 1965 (age 60–61) Prayagraj, Uttar Pradesh
- Party: Samajwadi Party
- Spouse: Late Ram Krishan Shastri

Geeta Shastri is an Indian politician from Uttar Pradesh. She is a member of the Uttar Pradesh Legislative Assembly representing Samajwadi Party from Soraon Assembly constituency in Prayagraj district. She won the 2022 Uttar Pradesh Legislative Assembly election.

== Early life and education ==
Shastri hails from an agricultural family in Phaphamau, Prayagraj district. She married Ramakrishna Shastri. She completed her intermediate in 1992 at Kashi Agriculture Inter College, Harhua, Varanasi, Uttar Pradesh.

== Career ==
Shastri won the 2022 Uttar Pradesh Legislative Assembly election from Soraon Assembly constituency representing Samajwadi Party. She polled 91,474 votes and defeated Jamuna Prasad of Apna Dal (Soneylal) by a margin of 5,590 votes.
