= Mandhata, Uttar Pradesh =

Coordinates: 25°47′53.5344″N 81°52′52.32036″E

Shahpur Afga is a village in Pratapgarh, Uttar Pradesh, India. Shahpur Afga is located 55 km from the district's main city of Belthra Road. The town lies through the bank of Bakulahi River.
