= Sardar Vallabhbhai Patel Police Museum =

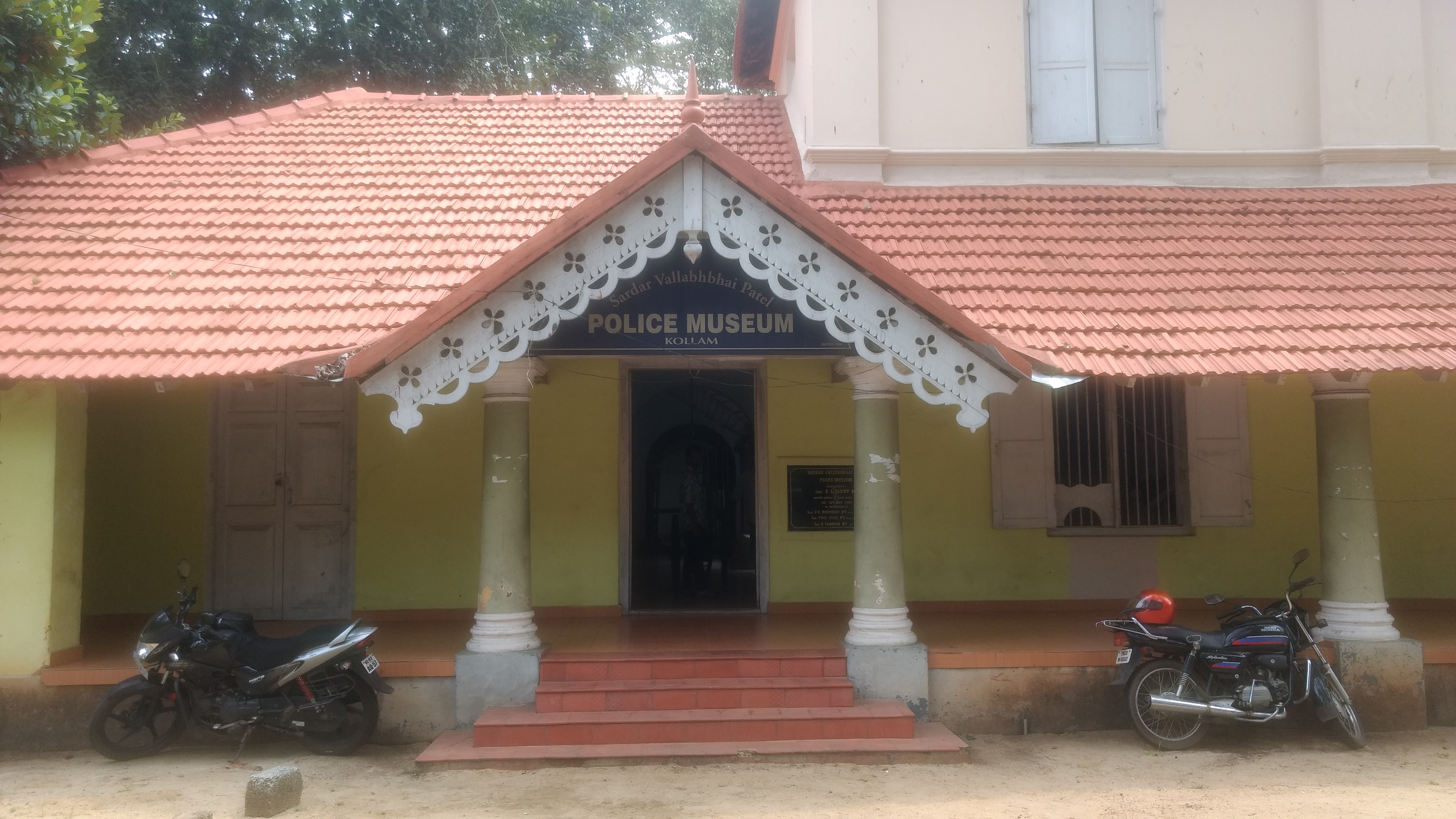
- Sardar Vallabhbhai Patel Police Museum

- Location of the Museum in Kerala, India
- Established: 10 May 1999; 27 years ago
- Location: Kollam, India
- Coordinates: 8.8845°N 76.5938°E
- Type: Police museum
- Public transit access: Kollam KSRTC - 1.5 km, Kollam Junction - 50 m
- Website: Sardar Vallabhbhai Patel Police Museum, Kollam

Sardar Vallabhbhai Patel Police Museum is a museum that traces the history and growth of the police force in India. It is located just opposite the Kollam Junction Railway Station in Kollam, India. The museum is dedicated to barrister and statesman, Vallabhbhai Patel.

== Attractions ==
The museum was opened in 2000. In addition to arms and ammunition of the 18th and 19th centuries, including bullets, guns, machines, and a diversity of other weapons, the museum houses information charts on DNA tests, human bones, fingerprints, snapshots of police dogs and a variety of medals awarded to policemen of different ranks. A concrete statue of Vallabhbhai Patel, weighing 1.1 tons and sculpted by Police Constable Mr. Santosh, was unveiled in January 2005.

== Location ==
- Kollam Junction railway station - 100 m (330 ft)
- Andamukkam City Bus Stand - 1.1 km (0.68 mi)
- Kollam KSRTC Bus Stand - 1.7 km (1.1 mi)
- Kollam Port - 2.9 km (1.8 mi)
- Kollam Beach - 2.2 km (1.4 mi)
- Asramam Maidan - 2.4 km (1.5 mi)

== Gallery ==
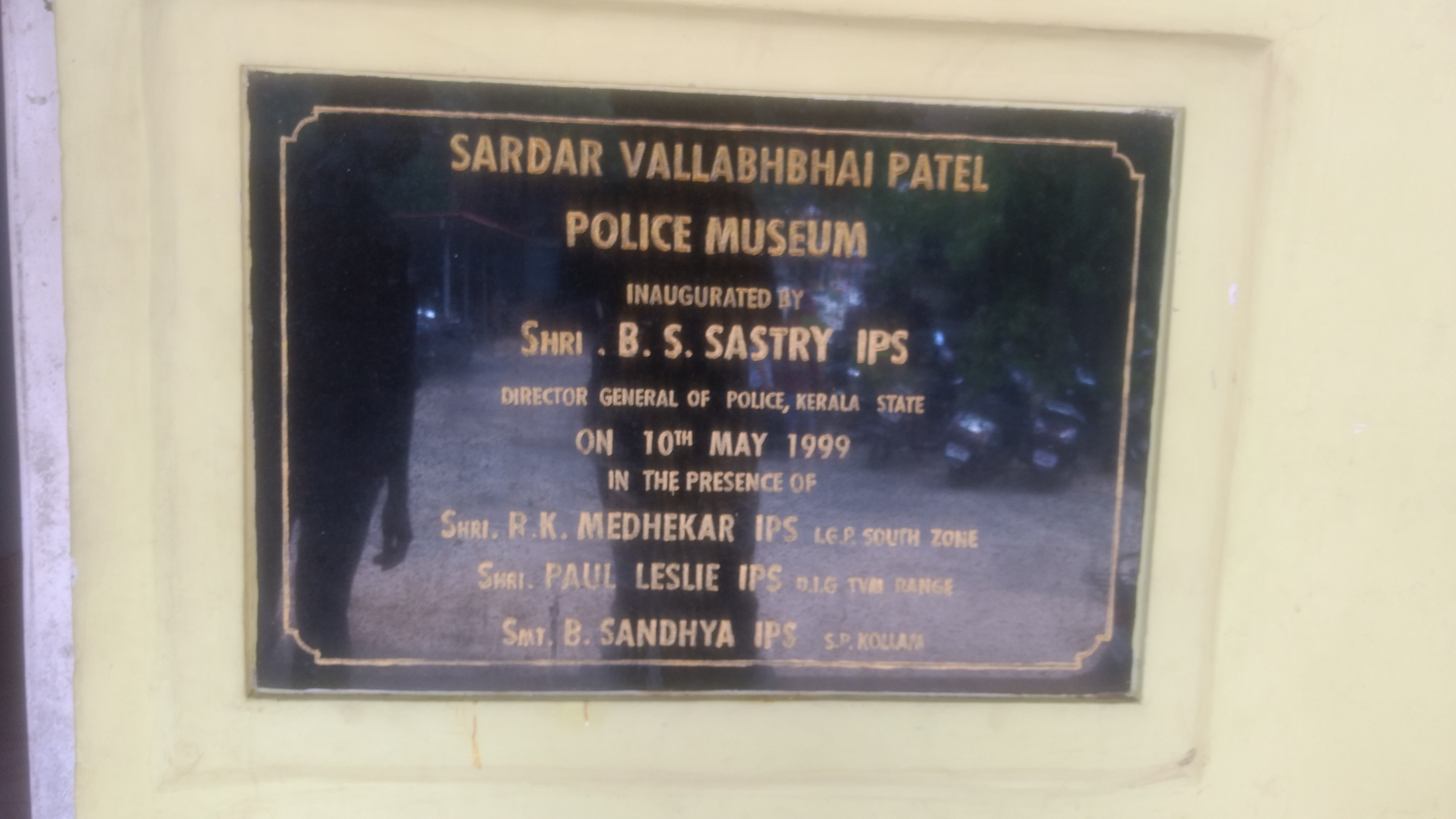
The stone plate showing the inauguration ceremony of the museum

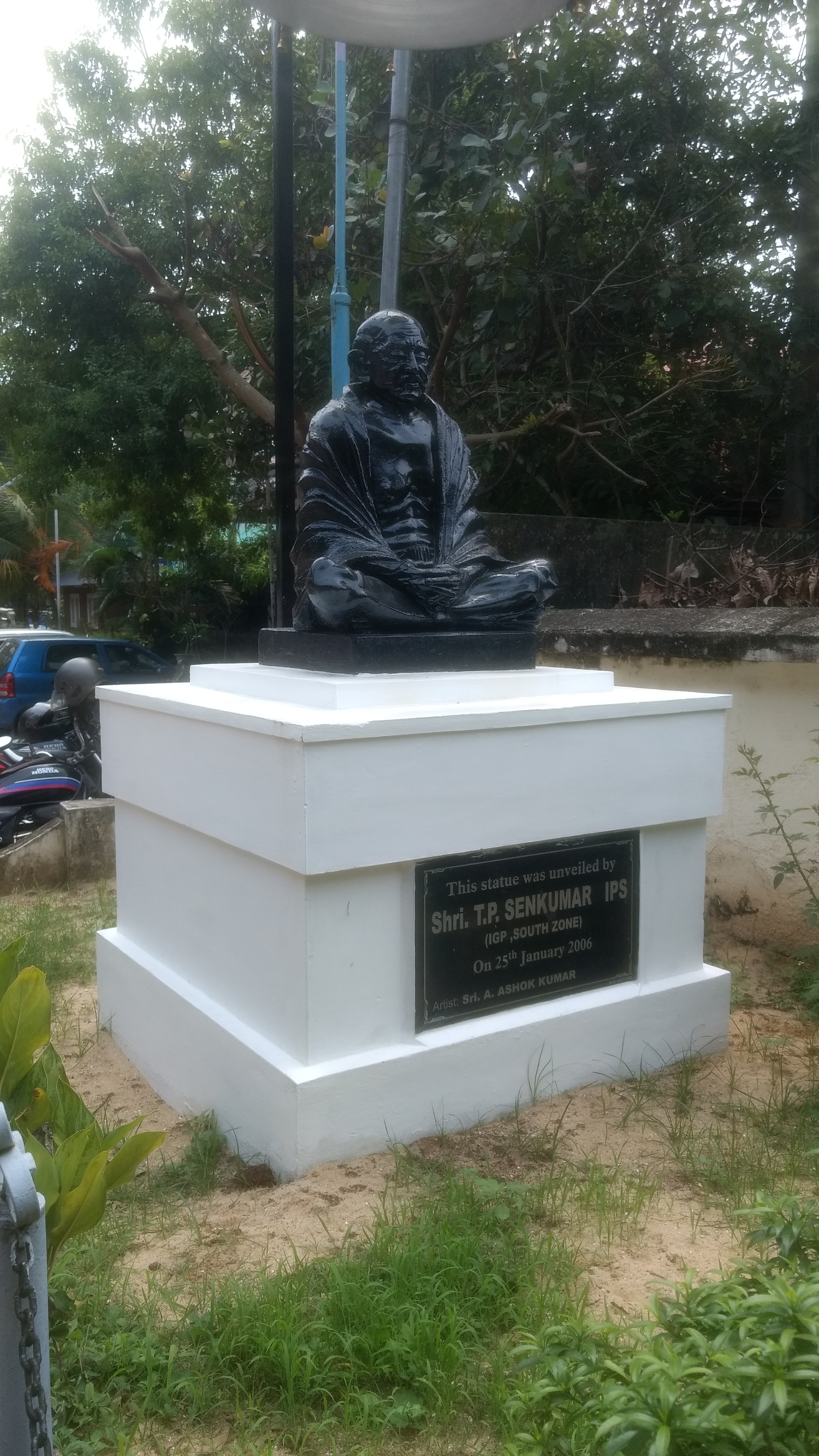
The statue of Mahatma Gandhi near the entrance

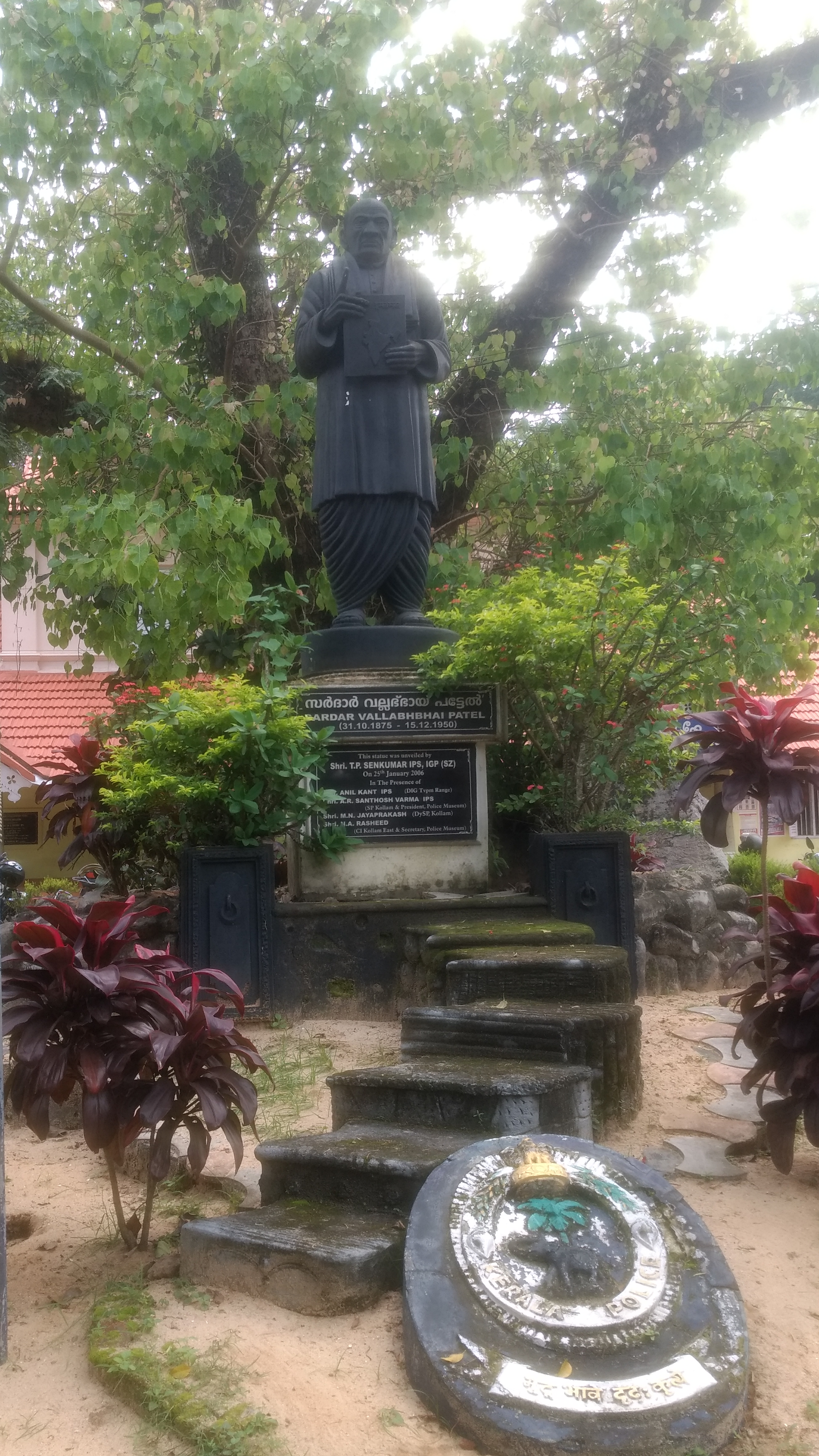
The statue of Sardar Vallabhai Patel is situated in front of the museum

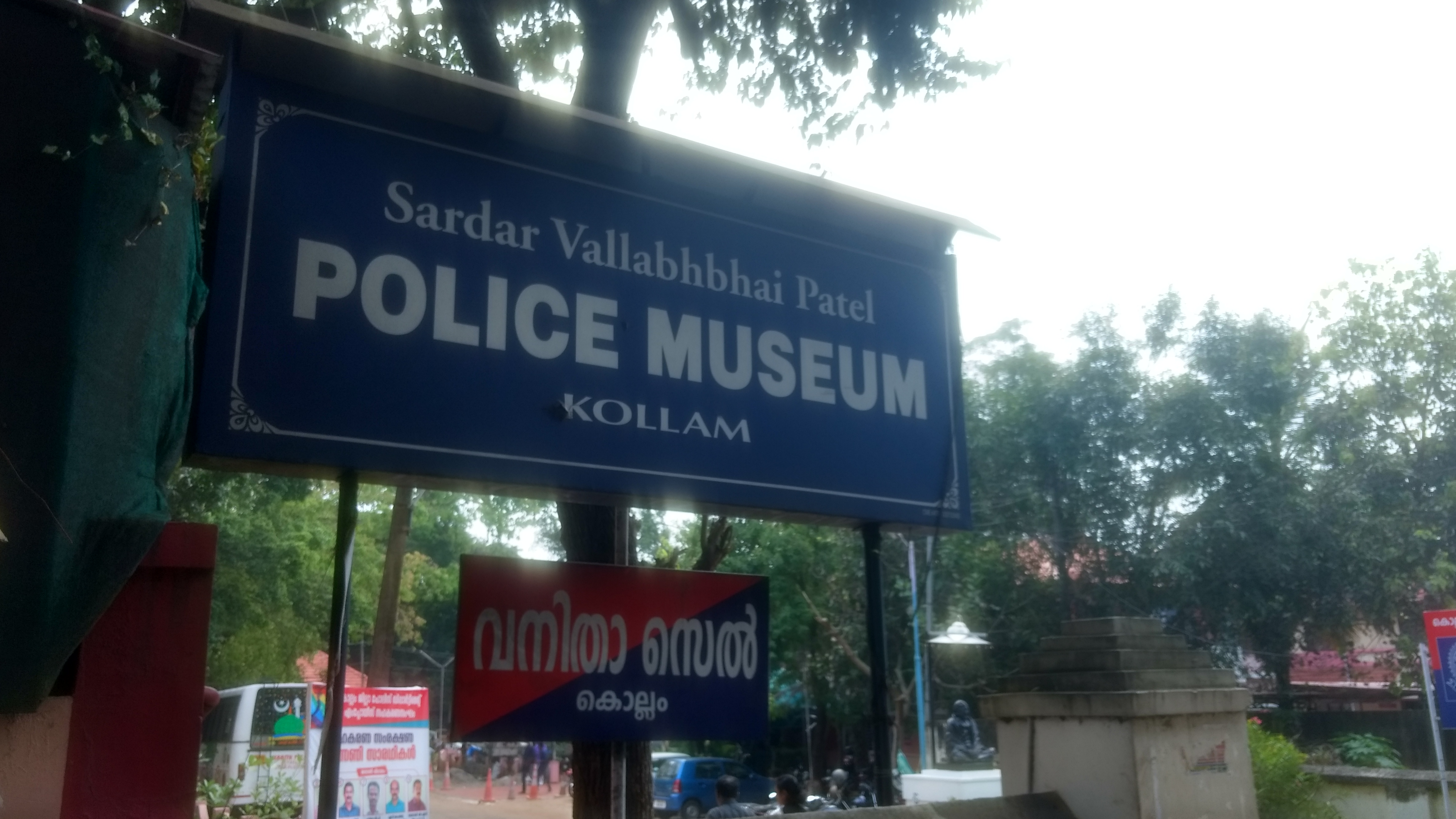
Board at the entrance
