= Kaurihar =

Kaurihar Kaudihar, Saraswati Pur
- City
- Nickname: Kaudihar
- Location in Uttar Pradesh, India Kaurihar (India)
- Coordinates: 25.5875°N 81.6662°E
- Country: India
- State: Uttar Pradesh
- District: Prayagraj
- Tehsil: Soraon

Languages
  - Official: Hindi
- Time zone: UTC+5:30 (IST)
- Postal code: 229411
- Vehicle registration: UP-70

Kaudihar is a block of Soraon tehsil in Prayagraj district. Kaurihar is located on the Lucknow-Prayagraj National Highway, at a distance of 22 km from the District headquarter.

Until 2019, it was the biggest block of Uttar Pradesh having more than 125 gram sabhas. It was divided into three blocks Kaurihar, Shringverpur Dham and Bhagwatpur.
