= Sardar Vallabhbhai Patel Chowk =

Coordinates: 25.9161°N 81.86074°E

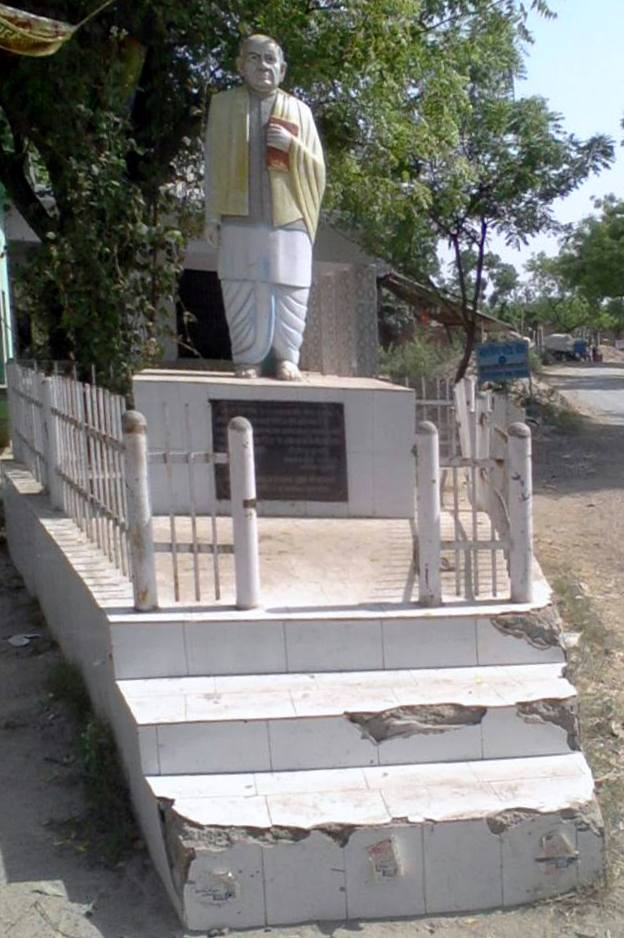
- Sardar Vallabhbhai Patel's statue at Katra Gulab Singh Tiraha
- Addresses: Gram Sabha Sarai Bhupati, Katra Gulab Singh
- Location: Pratapgarh, Uttar Pradesh, India

Sardar Vallabhbhai Patel Chowk is a chowk, located in Katra Gulab Singh Tiraha, Pratapgarh, Uttar Pradesh, India.

== Landmarks ==
A statue of Sardar Vallabhbhai Patel is located in this chowk.
