= Soraon Assembly constituency =

Constituency of the Uttar Pradesh legislative assembly in India

Coordinates: 25.61°N 81.85°E

Soraon
- Constituency No. 255 for the Uttar Pradesh Legislative Assembly

Constituency details
- Country: India
- Region: North India
- State: Uttar Pradesh
- District: Prayagraj
- Total electors: 3,65,758 (2017)
- Reservation: SC

Member of Legislative Assembly
- 18th Uttar Pradesh Legislative Assembly
- Incumbent Geeta Shastri
- Party: Samajwadi Party
- Elected year: 2022

Soraon is a constituency of the Uttar Pradesh Legislative Assembly covering the city of Soraon in the Prayagraj district of Uttar Pradesh, India.

Soraon is one of five assembly constituencies in the Phulpur Lok Sabha constituency. Since 2008, this assembly constituency is numbered 255 amongst 403 constituencies.

== Members of the Legislative Assembly ==
Election	Name	Party
2012	Satyaveer Munna	Samajwadi Party
2017	Jamuna Prasad	Apna Dal
2022	Geeta Shastri	Samajwadi Party

== Election results ==
=== 2027 ===
2027 Uttar Pradesh Legislative Assembly election: Soraon
Party	Candidate	Votes	%	±%
INDIA				
NDA				
BSP				
NOTA	None of the above			
Majority				
Turnout				
gain from		Swing		

=== 2022 ===
Samajwadi Party candidate Geeta Shastri won defeating Apna Dal (Sonelal) candidate Jamuna Prasad Saroj by a margin of 5,914 votes

2022 Uttar Pradesh Legislative Assembly election: Soraon
Party	Candidate	Votes	%	±%
SP	Geeta Shastri	91,474	40.99	+15.44
AD(S)	Jamuna Prasad Saroj	85,884	38.48	+1.89
BSP	Anand Bharti	29,250	13.11	−15.14
AIMIM	Sita Ram	5,128	2.3	
INC	Manoj Kumar Pasi	2,027	0.91	+0.51
NOTA	None of the above	1,712	0.77	−0.4
Majority		5,590	2.51	−5.83
Turnout		223,169	58.68	+0.53
SP gain from AD(S)		Swing		

=== 2017 ===
Apna Dal (Sonelal) candidate Jamuna Prasad won in 2017 Uttar Pradesh Legislative Elections defeating Bahujan Samaj Party candidate Geeta Devi by a margin of 17,735 votes. In 2012 Samajwadi Party candidate Satyaveer Munna won the Soraon Vidhan Sabha seat.

2017 Uttar Pradesh Legislative Assembly Election: Sorao
Party	Candidate	Votes	%	±%
AD(S)	Dr.Jamuna Prasad Saroj	77,814	36.59	
BSP	Geeta Pasi	60,079	28.25	
SP	Satyaveer Munna	54,345	25.55	
BJP	Surendra Chaudhari	6,522	3.07	
Independent	Ajay Pasi	2,907	1.37	
NOTA	None of the above	2,460	1.17	
Majority		17,735	8.34	
Turnout		212,679	58.15	
