= Vishwanathganj =

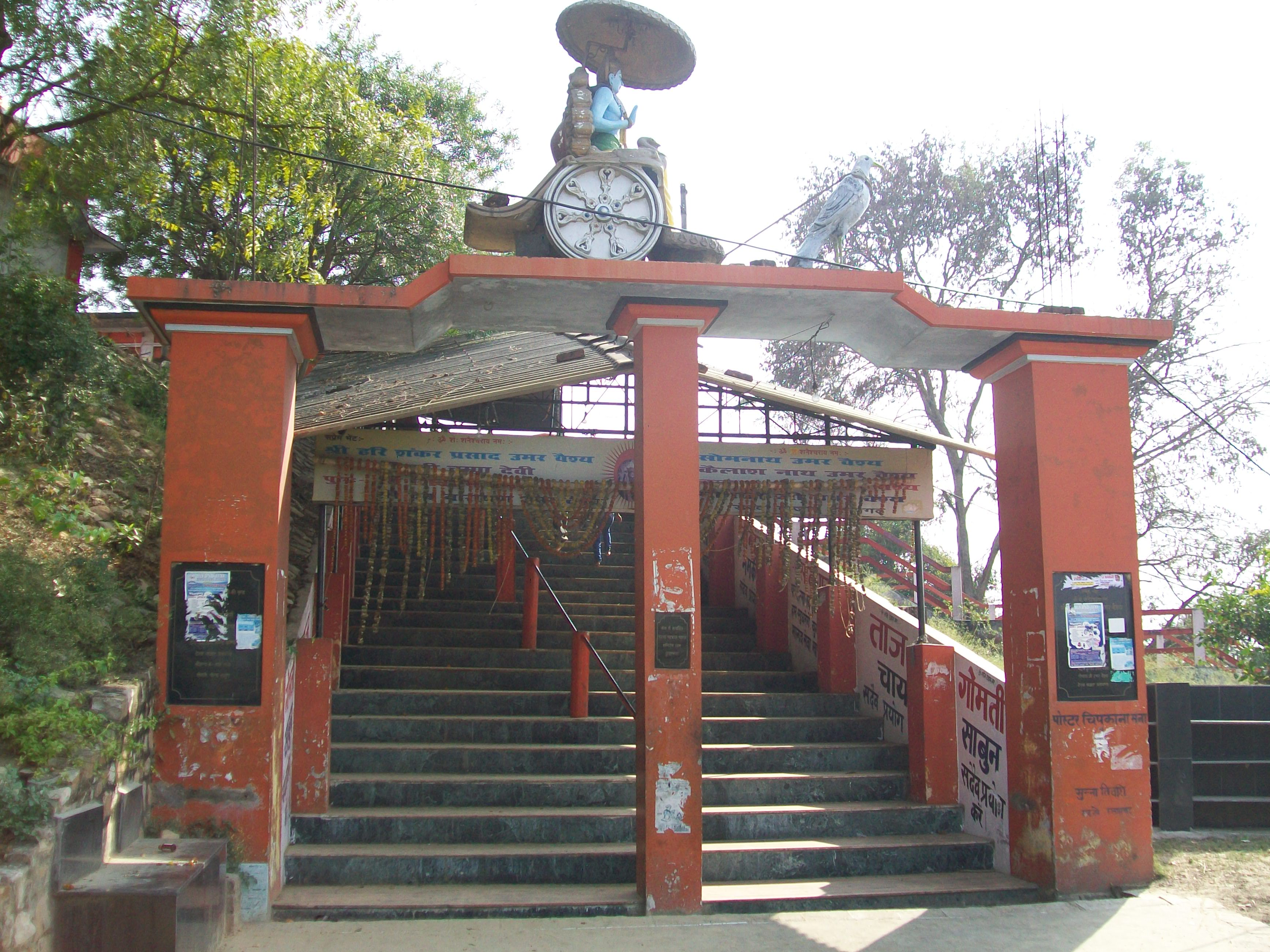
- Shani Dev Temple at Kushfara village

- Location of Vishwanathganj in Uttar Pradesh Vishwanathganj (India)
- Coordinates: 25.801804°N 81.935177°E
- Country: India
- State: Uttar Pradesh
- District: Pratapgarh

Government
  - Type: Vidhan Sabha
  - MLA: Jeet Lal Patel
- Elevation: 110 m (360 ft)
- Time zone: UTC+5:30 (Indian Standard Time)
- Postal Code: 230404
- Telephone Code: 05342
- Vehicle Registration: UP 72
- Website: Vishwanathganj

Vishwanathganj is a town in Pratapgarh district of the Indian state of Uttar Pradesh. It is an assembly constituency in Pratapgarh affiliated to Uttar Pradesh Vidhan Sabha.

== Geography ==
Vishwanathganj is located at 25.80766°N 81.59256°E. Bakulahi river also flows here.

=== Shani Dev Temple ===
Famous Shani Dev Temple of Kushfara, Vishwanathganj, Pratapgarh
Lord Shani's statue in Shani Dham	View of river Bakulahi from the Shani Dev Temple

Shani Dev Dham, the temple dedicated to Shani Dev, is located at a distance of about 51 km from Allahabad, 16 km from Pratapgarh, 116 km from Ayodhya, & 3 km from Vishwanathganj in Kushfara village. Hanuman and Manokamana temples are also situated in the same premises. Every Saturday people throng in large numbers & perform special worship here. Navratri is also celebrated here. On the third day of Kartik month a Rathyatra is also organized here.

== Election synopsis ==
Vishwanathganj is one of the Vidhan Sabha of Pratapgarh. Raja Ram Pandey is current Member of Legislative Assembly from the constituency.

== Transport ==
Viswanathganj is its own railway station. It belongs to Northern Railway, Lucknow . Neighbourhood stations are Dhirganj, Near By major railway station is Pratapgarh, Phaphamau and Prayagraj_Railway_Station and Airport is Bamrauli Airport.
