= Bakulahi River =

Bakulahi River Balkuni River
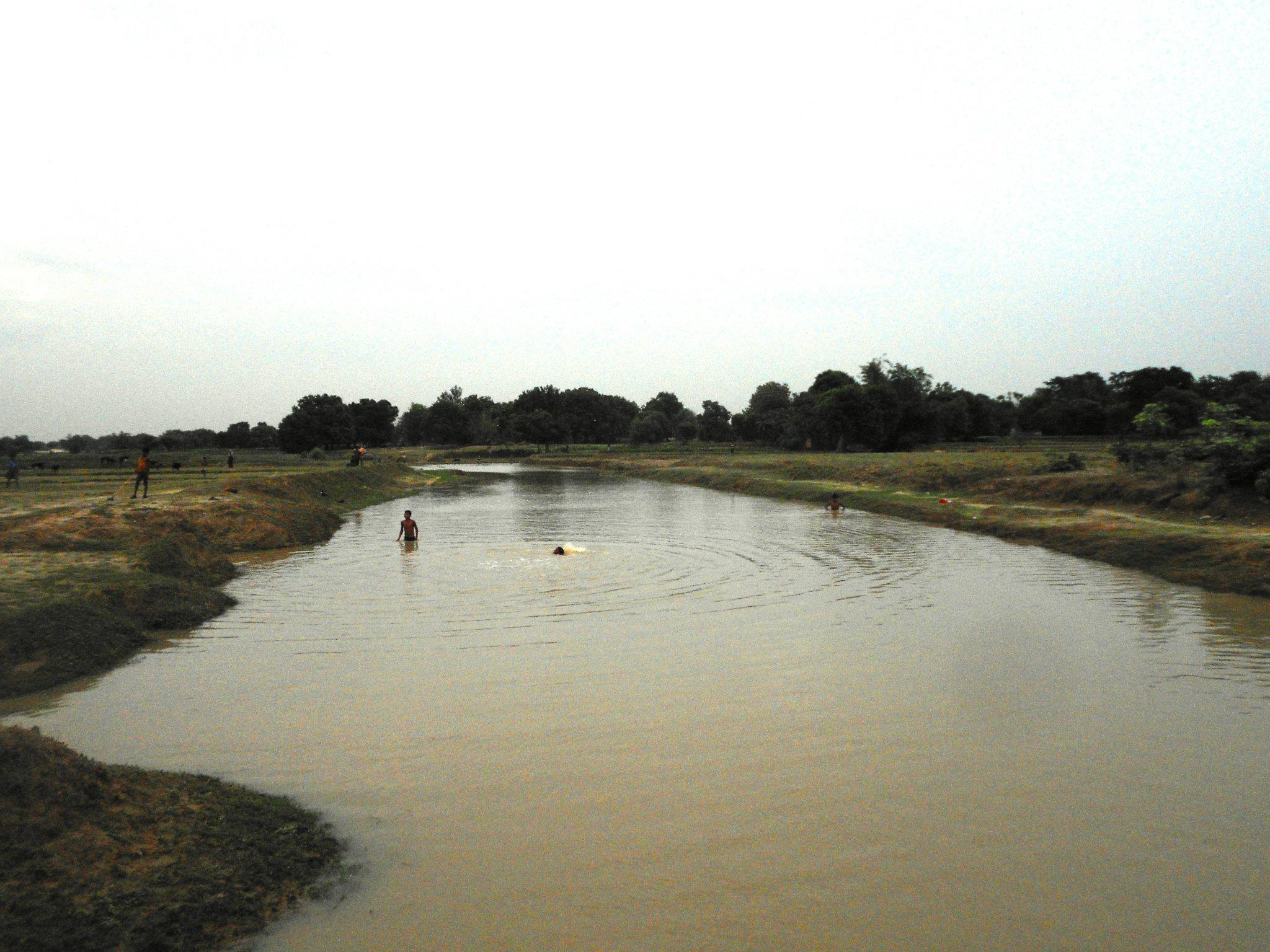

Physical characteristics
- Source
  - location: Khair tal, Barna tal, Garhi tal, Panhi tal, and Manjhihar tal,
- Mouth
  - location: Tributary of Sai

The Bakulahi River (Hindi: बकुलाही नदी, Urdu: باکلاهی) Bakulahi river is situated between Sai River and Ganga River in upper Ganga floodplain with about 841 km2 basin area. The length of the present Bakulahi River is about 177 km. It is one of the tributary of Sai River (the tributary of Gomati River) flowing from north-west to south-east joining Sai river in the south-east of Pratapgarh city. The Bakulahi River originates from interconnected series of tals—Khair tal, Barna tal, Garhi tal, Panhi tal, and Manjhihar tal and collects headwaters from the surrounding highlands, flowing through southern part of Raibareli district. Its banks are densely populated and form a fertile agricultural area.

== History ==
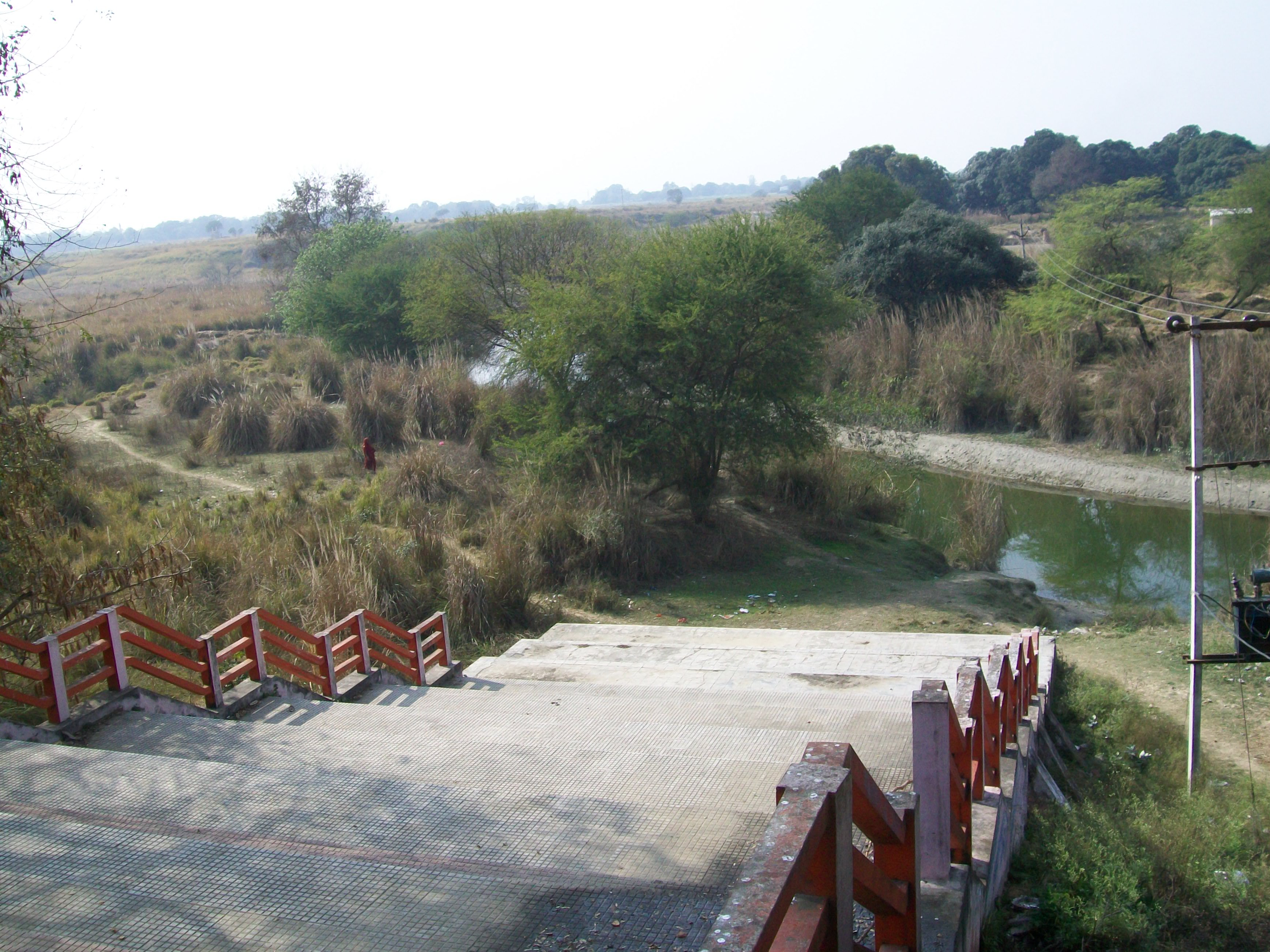
Bakulahi flowing through Vishwanathganj's Shani Devi Temple.

Bakulahi River is oldest river, it is mentioned in Vedas. This river is of ancient significance, finding mentions in the epic Ramayana and Mahabharata. Its ancient and historical name was BALKUNI but Presently the river is known as Bakulahi. As the river had a large quantity of sand and pebbles in it, it was named Balukini.

== Origin ==
Bakulahi River originates from Bharatpur Lake of Rae Bareli district of Uttar Pradesh. The Bakulahi river flows through Rai bareili district and Pratapgarh district of Uttar Pradesh. Bakulahi river falls down in Sai river (Tributary of Gomti river) in Kajurni village of Mandhata block.

== Gallery ==
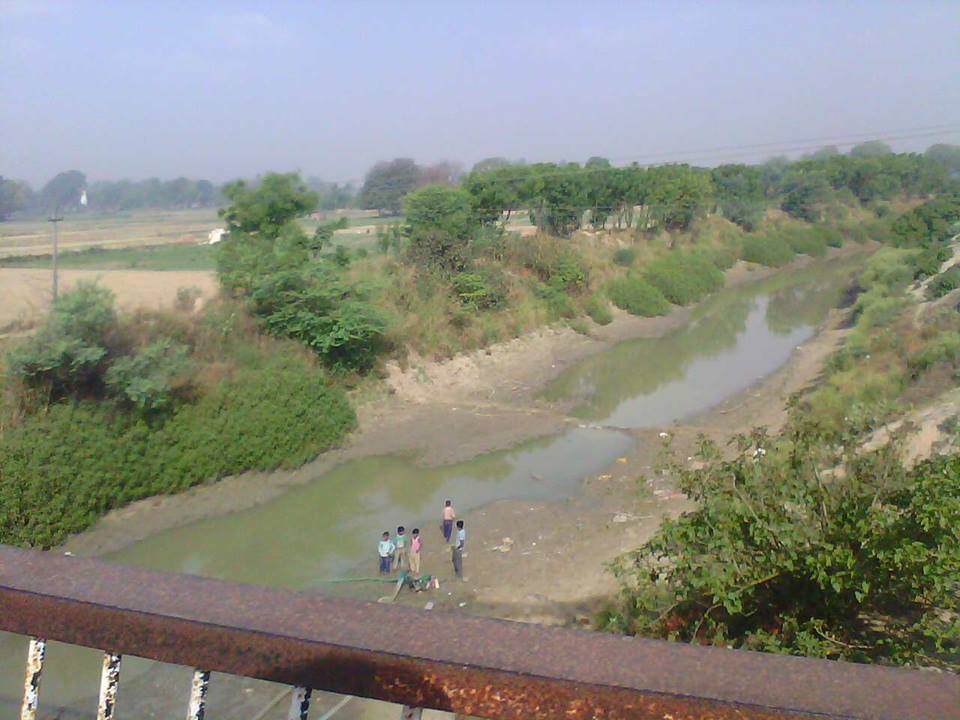

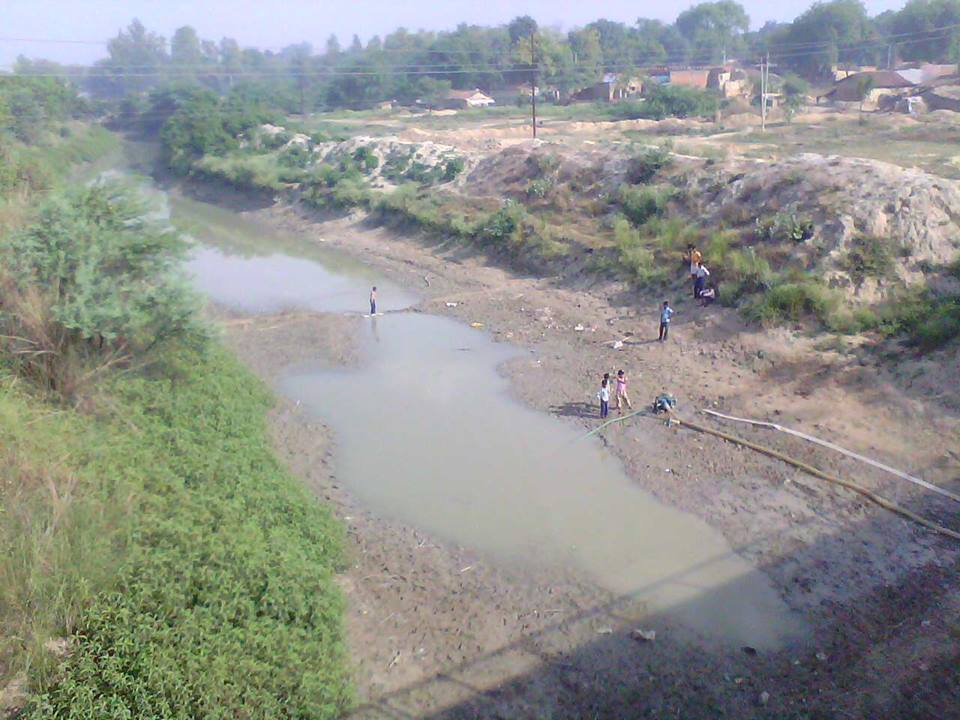

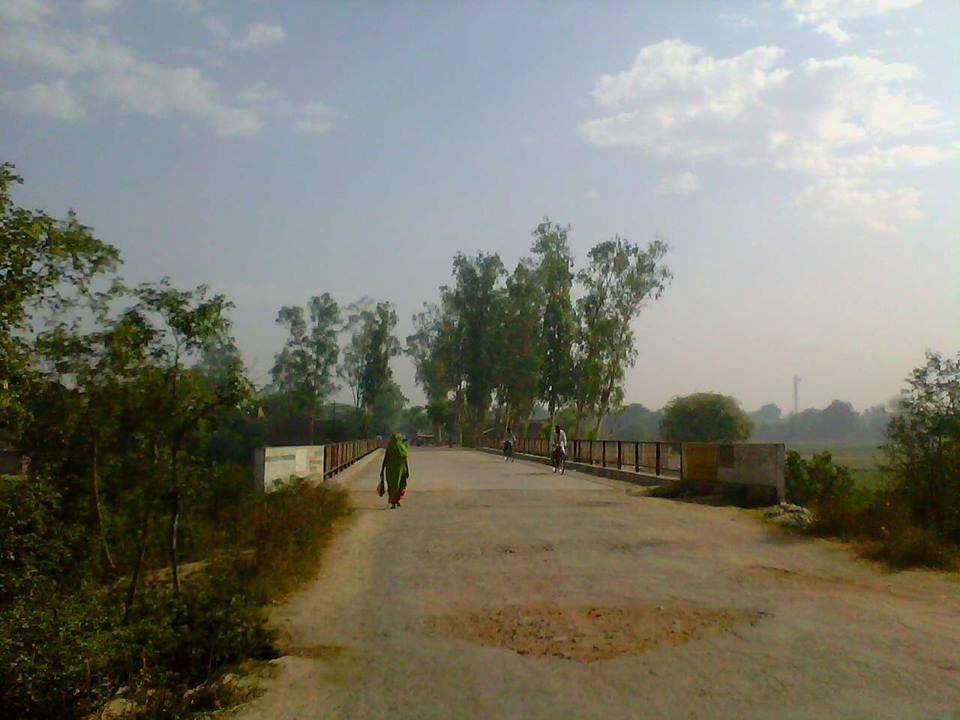

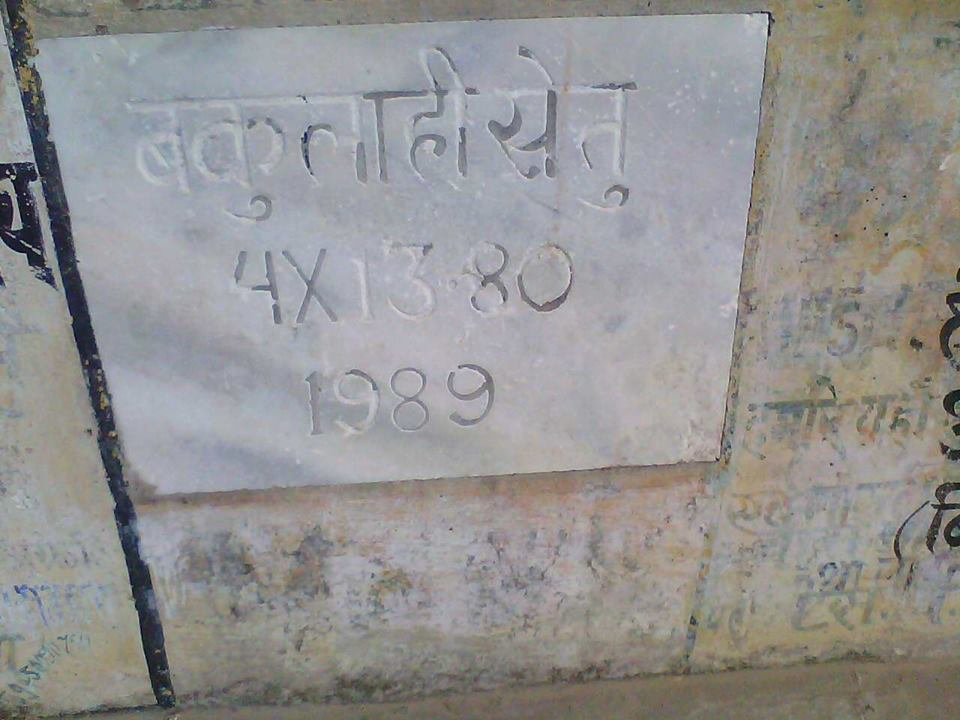
