= Mau Aima =

- Town
- Nickname: Kasba
- Location in Uttar Pradesh, India
- Coordinates: 25°42′N 81°55′E
- Country: India
- State: Uttar Pradesh
- District: Prayagraj

Area
  - Total: 3.5 km^{2} (1.4 sq mi)

Population (2011)
  - Total: 27,645
  - Density: 5,613/km^{2} (14,540/sq mi)

Language
  - Official: Hindi
  - Additional official: Urdu
- Time zone: IST
- Postal code: 212507
- Vehicle registration: UP 70

Mau Aima is an industrial town and a nagar panchayat in Prayagraj district in the Indian state of Uttar Pradesh. It is remarkably popular for its power loom industry.

== Location ==
It is positioned in the north of Prayagraj, 30 km on the state highway from Prayagraj to Ayodhya. Chitpalgarh, Raniganj, Siwaith and Sikandra are some of the towns surrounding Mau Aima. The Mau Aima Railway Station on the Ayodhya-Prayagraj rail route is the nearest railway station and the Prayagraj airport at the distance of 49 km is the nearest airport. Other nearby two airports are Ayodhya (Maryada Purushottam Shri Ram International Airport - 126 km) and Banaras (Lal Bahadur Shastri International Airport - 136 km).The historical town of Shringverpur is located at a distance of 12 km. Historical Shri Pandeshvar Mahadev Temple (Pandila Mahadev Temple) is located at a distance of 23 km near Phaphamau.

== Economy ==
It is known for the manufacture of cotton, polyester and nylon clothes. The main business of Mau Aima is power loom.

== Demographics ==
As of 2023 census, Mau Aima nagar panchayat had a total population of 27,150 of which 13,876 were males and 13,474 were females. Population within the age group of 0 to 6 years was 4,659. The total number of literates in Mau Aima was 21,295 , which constituted 75,7% of the population with male literacy of 82.4% and female literacy of 72.6%. The effective literacy rate of 7+ population of Mau Aima was 78.3%, of which male literacy rate was 83.7% and female literacy rate was 72.5%. The Scheduled Castes population was 1,510. Mau Aima had 2754 households in 2011.
