= Belha Devi Temple =

Belha Devi Mandir
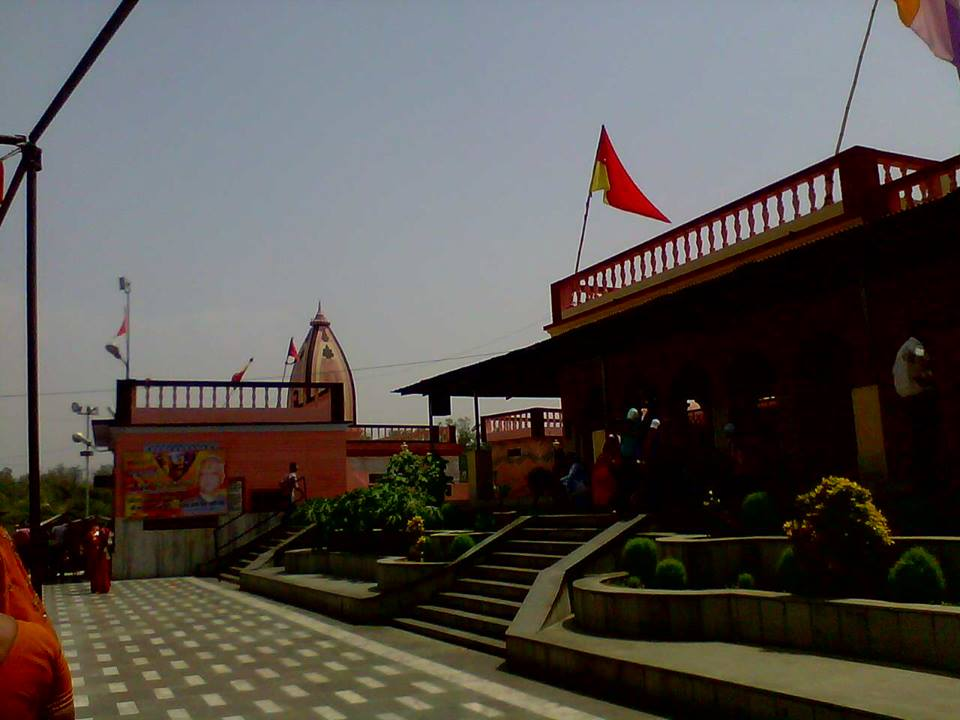
- Belha Devi Temple

Religion
- Affiliation: Hinduism
- District: Pratapgarh
- Deity: Goddess Belha Mata
- Festival: Navratri

Location
- Location: Awadh
- State: Uttar Pradesh
- Country: India
- Interactive map of Belha Devi Mandir
- Coordinates: 25°56′02″N 82°00′07″E

Architecture
- Completed: 18th century

Website
- www.belhadevi.com

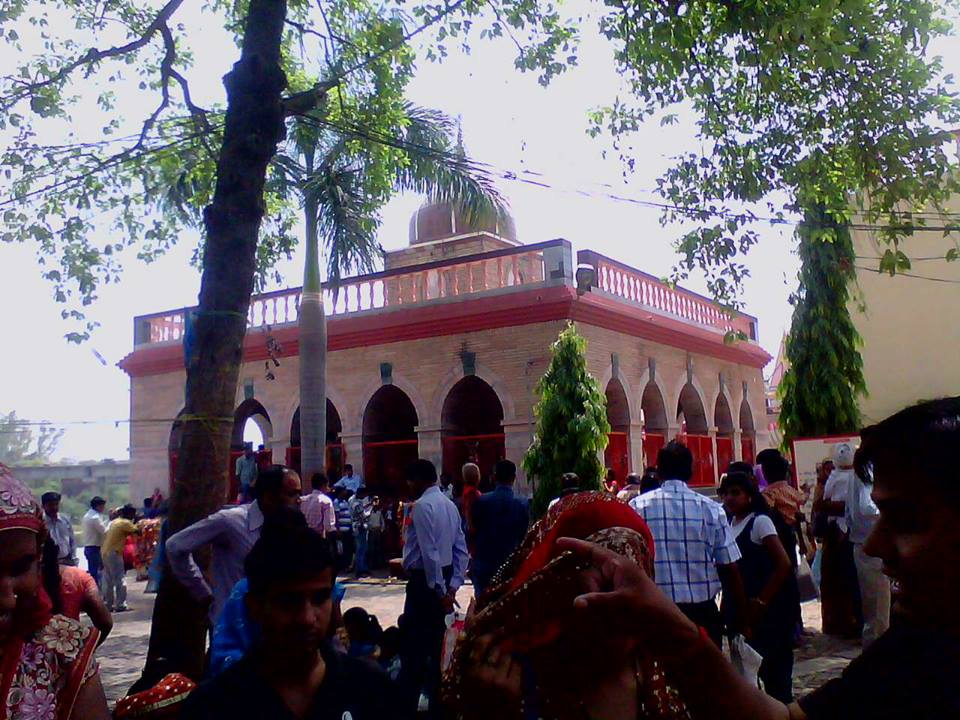
Belha Devi Temple, Pratapgarh, Uttar Pradesh

Belha Devi Temple (Hindi: बेल्हा देवी मंदिर) is an old Hindu temple in the city of Bela Pratapgarh, dedicated to the goddess Belha, the local incarnation of the Devi (Mother Goddess).

Belha Devi Temple is another Shakti temple situated in Pratapgarh district of Uttar Pradesh state of India. The name of the city Bela (now called Bela Pratapgarh or Pratapgarh) is derived from Maa Belha Devi. This temple is dedicated to city's patron Goddess Belha Bhavani.

Mata Belha Devi Temple at Pratapgarh is a symbol of Hindu culture and faith. The shrine located on the bank of Sai river is an epitome of age old tradition of Shakti worship in northern India. Belha Devi being the abode of Shiva and his consort ’shakti’ became centre of shakti worship.

However, the present temple which stands a witness to the exciting past of the Pratapgarh region is about two hundred years old. The archeological treasures unearthed from Uttar Pradesh region throw eloquent light on the history and culture of the area from the prehistoric to the recent times. Although owing to the onslaught of times and climes many tangible realities of the cultural manifestations of the region have been lost in the oblivion, yet there are certain things which never die out. One such reality is the Belha Devi Shrine and the tradition of shaktism practised in this part of the country, where the past has been rejuvenated for sustaining one of the living traditions of shaktism in India.

== History ==
Raja Pratap Bhahadur Singh of Awadh constructed the present main temple of Shri Belha Devi, which is situated on the bank of Sai river in District Pratapgarh, during the period 1811–15.

This temple had the patronage of Awadh State. The raja of Pratapgarh appointed pujari as "Pujari Name" of this temple whose duty was to worship the deity of the temple. After the merger of princely State into district these pujaris became independent on the matter of controlling and managing the affairs of the temple and the land attached to the temple. They are maintaining this temple and providing necessary facilities to the visiting devotees and thus the condition of the temple progressed day by day. So much so that there were proper arrangements for pilgrims visiting the temple during Navaratra melas.

== About the deity ==
In the sanctum sanctorum Belha Devi is worshiped in the form of pindi (stone pebbles). Originally the pindis were only worshiped by the devotees. However, in modern times a marble bust of the deity was got sculpted for giving an attractive human look (form) to the deity. The Goddess is beautifully decorated with crown and other ornaments.

In the sanctorum the Devi is worshiped in its anthropomorphic form sculpted on marble. The bust is enshrined in a silver-plated small vaulted shrine showing a beautiful decoration of silver embossing works throughout the body of the miniature vaulted shrine. Here also the pindi (stone) is worshiped along with the marble bust.

== Darshan timing ==
The temple remains open from 4am to 10pm in the summer and from 5am to 9pm in the winter. Everybody can have Darshan during this period by entering from main gate. There is a separate gate for exit. Red Stone Pavement of size 75’ × 105’ has been provided in front of Shakti Dhwaj where devotees wait for their turn. Brass railing from Shakti Dhwaj to Ardh Mandap has been laid so that devotees may enter the temple in two queues and have easy Darshan without any difficulty of rush. The devotees are allowed to bring packed prashad in the mandir. The Prashad so offered by the devotees is placed in the feet of the deity and returned to the devotees. Offering in kind is poured in the Dan Pater placed in front of each temple.

== See also ==
- Chauharjan Devi (Maa Barahi Devi Dham)
- Nandmahar Dham
- Mata Mawai Dham
- Jwaladevi Temple
- Ghuisarnath Temple
- Chandikan Devi Temple
- Lodi Baba Mandir
