= Chauharjan Devi Temple =

Hindu temple in India

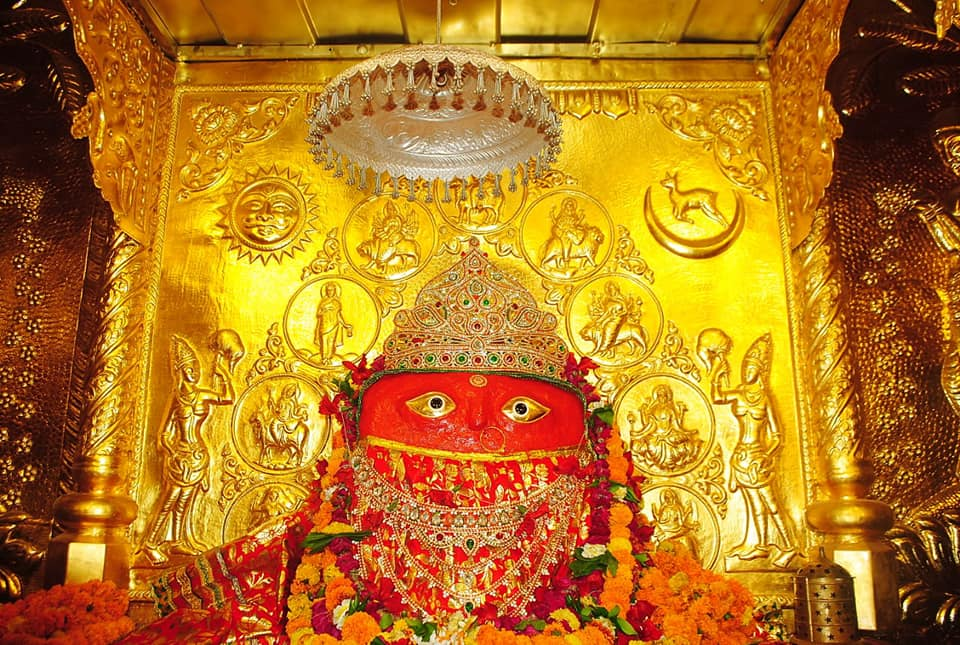
Maa Barahi Devi

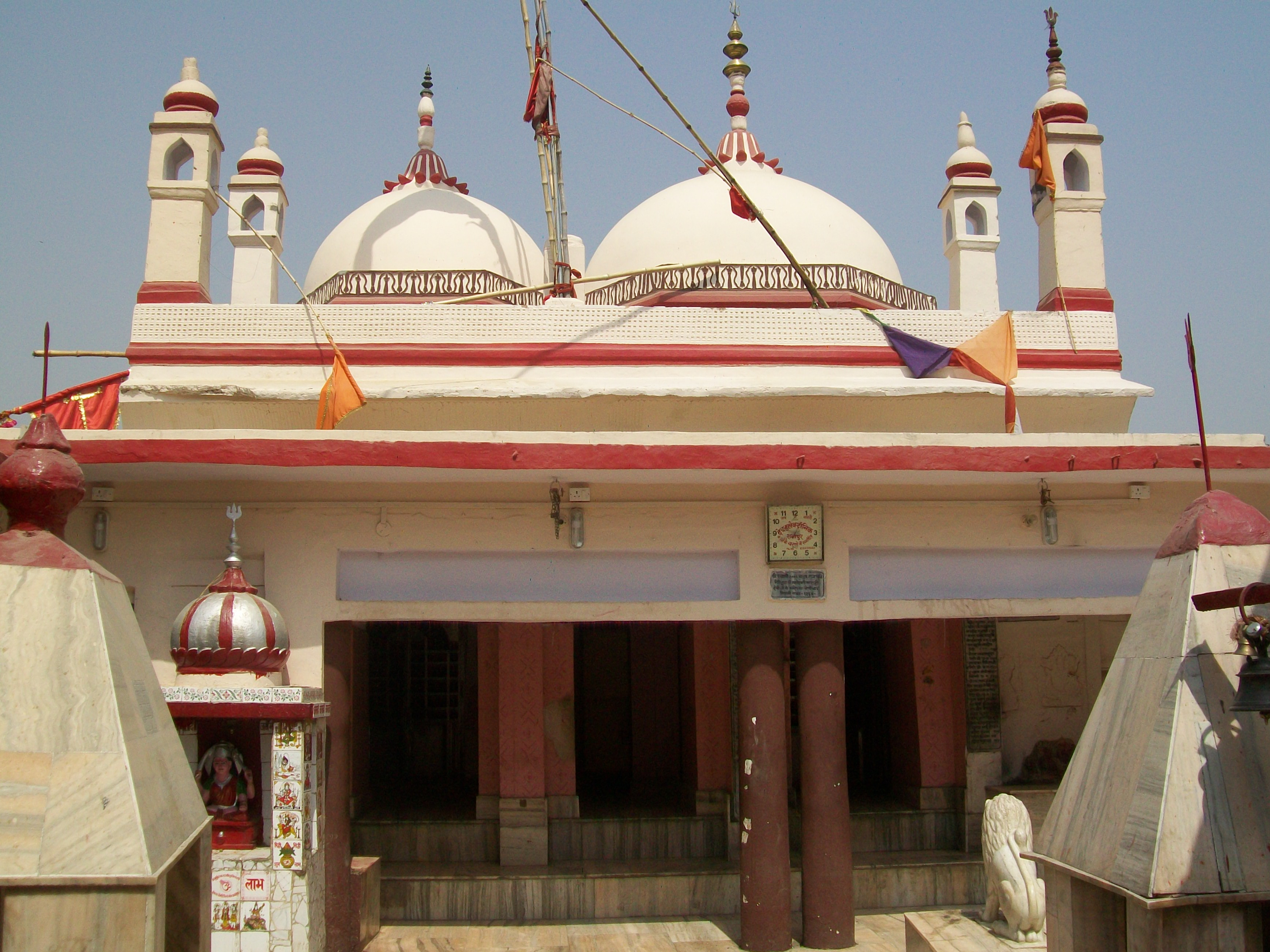
Chauharjan (Barahi) Devi Temple

Chauharjan Devi Temple also known as Barahi Devi Temple is a Hindu (Sanatan Religion) temple of mother goddess Barahi or Chauharjan Devi, located in village Chauharjan Parasrampur in Pratapgarh, Uttar Pradesh. The temple is located on the holy bank of river Sai.

== See also ==
- Nandmahar Dham
- Mata Mawai Dham
- Maa Belha Devi Dham
- Maa Barahi Devi Dham
