= Lalganj =

Lalganj may refer to several places in India:

== Bihar ==
- Lalganj, Bihar, a town in Vaishali district
- Lalganj (community development block)
- Lalganj, Bihar Assembly constituency

== Uttar Pradesh ==
- Lalganj, Uttar Pradesh, a town in Raebareli district
- Lalganj Lok Sabha constituency
- Lalganj, Uttar Pradesh Assembly constituency
- Lalganj Ajhara, a tehsil in Pratapgarh district
- Katghar Lalganj, a town in Azamgarh district

== See also ==
- Lalganj Assembly constituency (disambiguation)
