= Ghuisarnath Temple =

Hindu temple in India

- घुइसरनाथ (घुश्मेश्वरनाथ) धाम
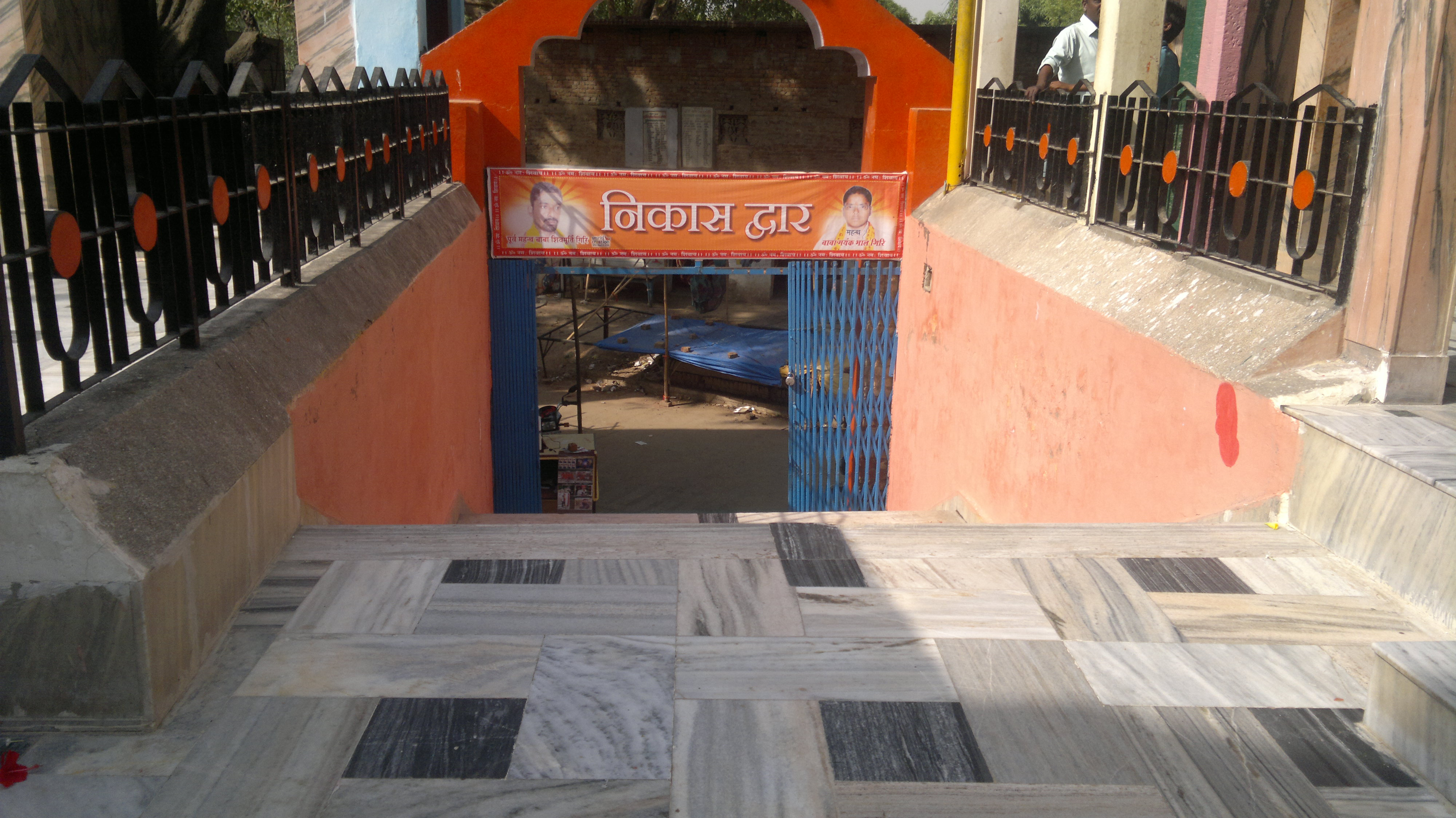
- Ghuisarnath (Ghushmeshwar) Temple at Lalganj Ajhara

- Location in Uttar Pradesh 25.96055

Religion
- Affiliation: Hinduism
- District: Pratapgarh
- Deity: Shiva

Location
- Location: Lalganj Ajhara
- State: Uttar Pradesh
- Country: India
- Interactive map of Ghuisarnath Temple
- Coordinates: 25.96055°N 81.6777°E

Website
- www.Ghuisarnath.com

Ghuisarnath or Ghushmeshwarnath Temple is a Hindu temple located on the bank of Sai River at Lalganj Ajhara, Pratapgarh, India. The temple is situated at a distance of about 45 km from Pratapgarh & 145 km from Ayodhya, in Bela Pratapgarh. This magnificent temple dedicated to Lord Shiva, is the center of people's faith & spirituality.Jyotirlinga find mention in Shiva Puran.

== History ==
सौराष्ट्रे सोमनाथं च श्री शैले मल्लिकार्जुनम
उज्जयिन्यां महाकालंओंकारं ममलेश्वरम
केदारं हिमवत्प्रष्ठे डाकिन्यां भीमशंकरम
वाराणस्यां च विश्वेशं त्रयम्बकं गोतमी तटे
वैधनाथं चितभूमौ नागेशं दारुकावने
सेतुबन्धे च रामेशं घुश्मेशं तु शिवालये
(शिव पुराण कोटि रुद्र संहिता अध्याय 32-33)

According to Shiva Purana, in the southern direction, on a bank of lake lived a Brahmin called Brahmavetta Sudharm along with his wife Sudeha. The couple did not have a child because of which Sudeha was sad. Sudeha prayed and tried all possible remedies but in vain. Frustrated of being childless, Sudeha got her sister Ghushma married to her husband. On the advice of her sister, Ghushma used to make 101 lingas, worship them and discharge them in the nearby lake. With the blessings of Lord Shiva, Ghushma gave birth to a baby boy. Because of this, Ghushma became proud and Sudeha started feeling jealous towards her sister. Out of jealously, one night she killed Ghushma son and threw him in the lake where Ghushma used to discharge the lingas. Next morning, Ghushmas and Sudharm got involved in daily prayers and ablutions. Sudeha too, got up and started performing her daily choirs. Ghushma's daughter-in-law, however, saw stains of blood on her husband's bed and parts of the body drenched in blood. Horrified, she narrated everything to mother-in-law Ghushma who was absorbed in worshipping Shiva. Ghushma did not deter. Even her husband Sudharma did not move an inch. Even when Ghushma saw the bed drenched in blood she did not break down and said he who has given me this child shall protect him and started reciting "Shiva-Shiva". Later, when she went to discharge the Shivalingas after prayers she saw her son coming. Seeing her son Ghushma was neither happy nor sad. At that time Lord Shiv appeared before her and said – I am pleased with your devotion. Your sister had killed your son. Ghushma told Lord to forgive Sudeha and emancipate her. Pleased with her generosity, Lord Shiva asked her another boon. Ghushma said that if he was really happy with her devotion then he should reside here eternally for the benefit of the multitudes in form of a Jyotirling and may you be known by my name. On her request, Lord Shiva manifested himself in the form of a Jyotirling and assumed the name Ghushmeshwar and the lake was named as Sai thereafter.

== Transportation ==
Pratapgarh is easily accessible from all parts of the country. Very well connected by road, rail and air. The City offers convenient and comfortable traveling options to and from other cities of India.

=== By air ===
Babatpur airport, Varanasi is 106 km. from Pratapgarh and Amaousi Airport, Lucknow which is 150 km. from Pratapgarh.

=== By rail ===
Pratapgarh is an important and major rail junction. The city is served by trains from all metros and major cities across the country. New Delhi, Mumbai, Calcutta, Chennai, Gwalior, Kolkata, Allahabad, Lucknow, Dehradun, Bangalore, Jammu. The city has direct rail connections.

=== By road ===
Pratapgarh, on National Highway 56 (India) from Lucknow to Pratapgarh, is connected literally to the rest of the country by good motor-able, all – weather roads. Some important road distances are: Agra 530 km., Allahabad 80 km., Bhopal 761 km., Kanpur 290 km., Lucknow 170 km., UPSRTC Bus Stand, Pratapgarh Bus Stand, Lalganj Bus Stand.

=== Local transport ===
Private taxis are available from travel, auto rickshaws, cycle rickshaws and Tempos are also readily available.

== See also ==
- Nandmahar Dham
- Mata Mawai Dham
- Lodi Baba Mandir

== Gallery ==
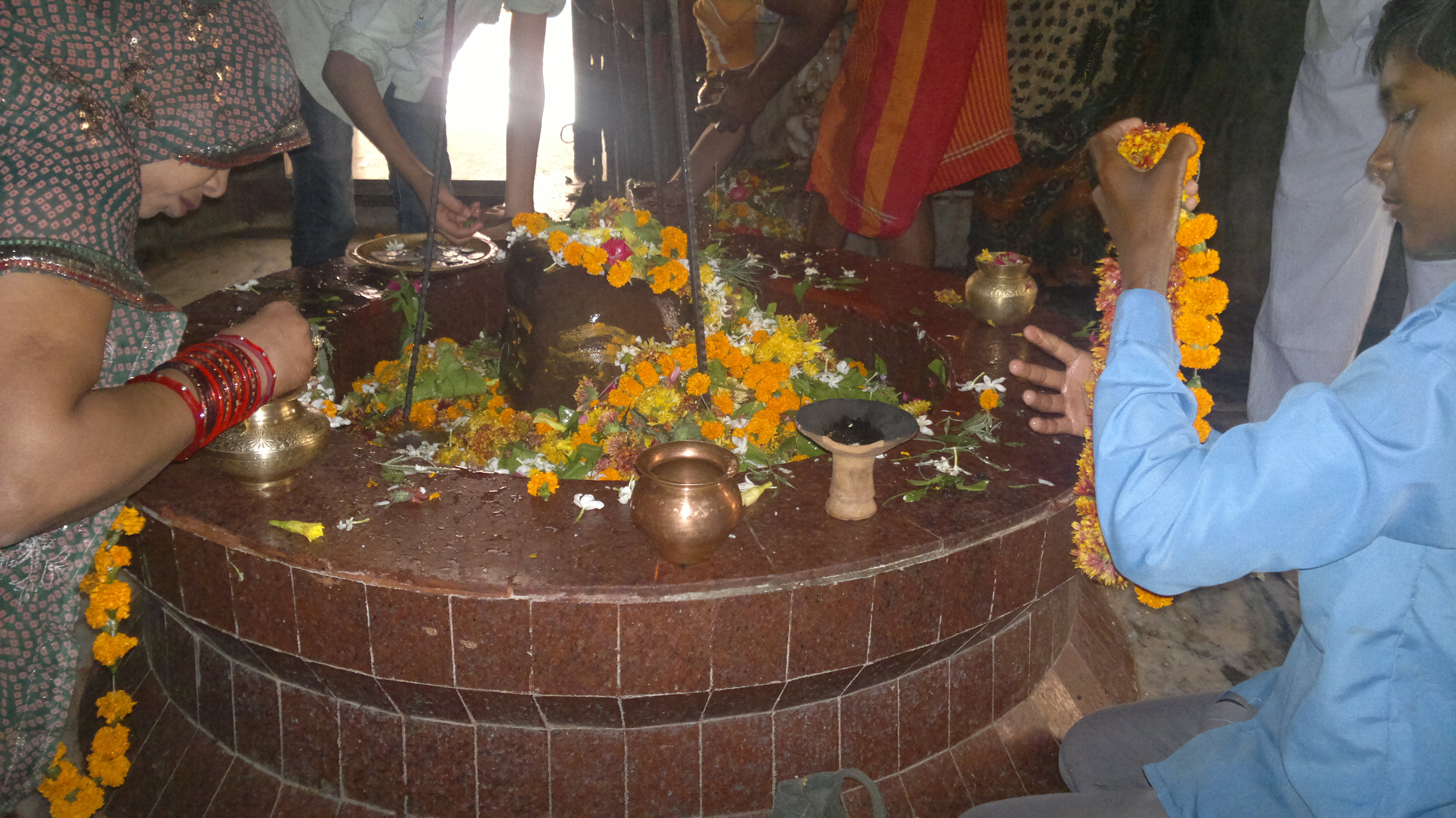

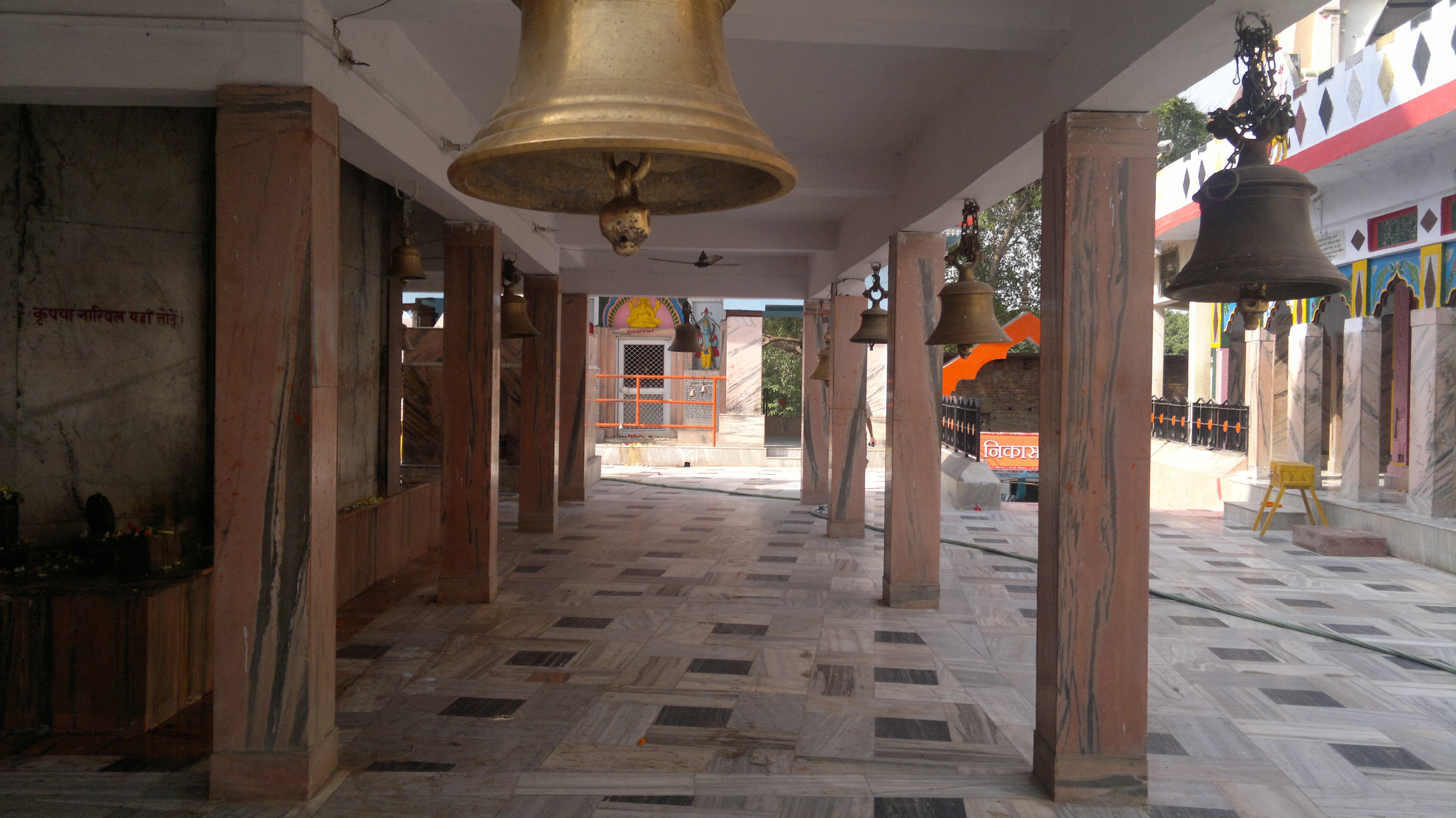

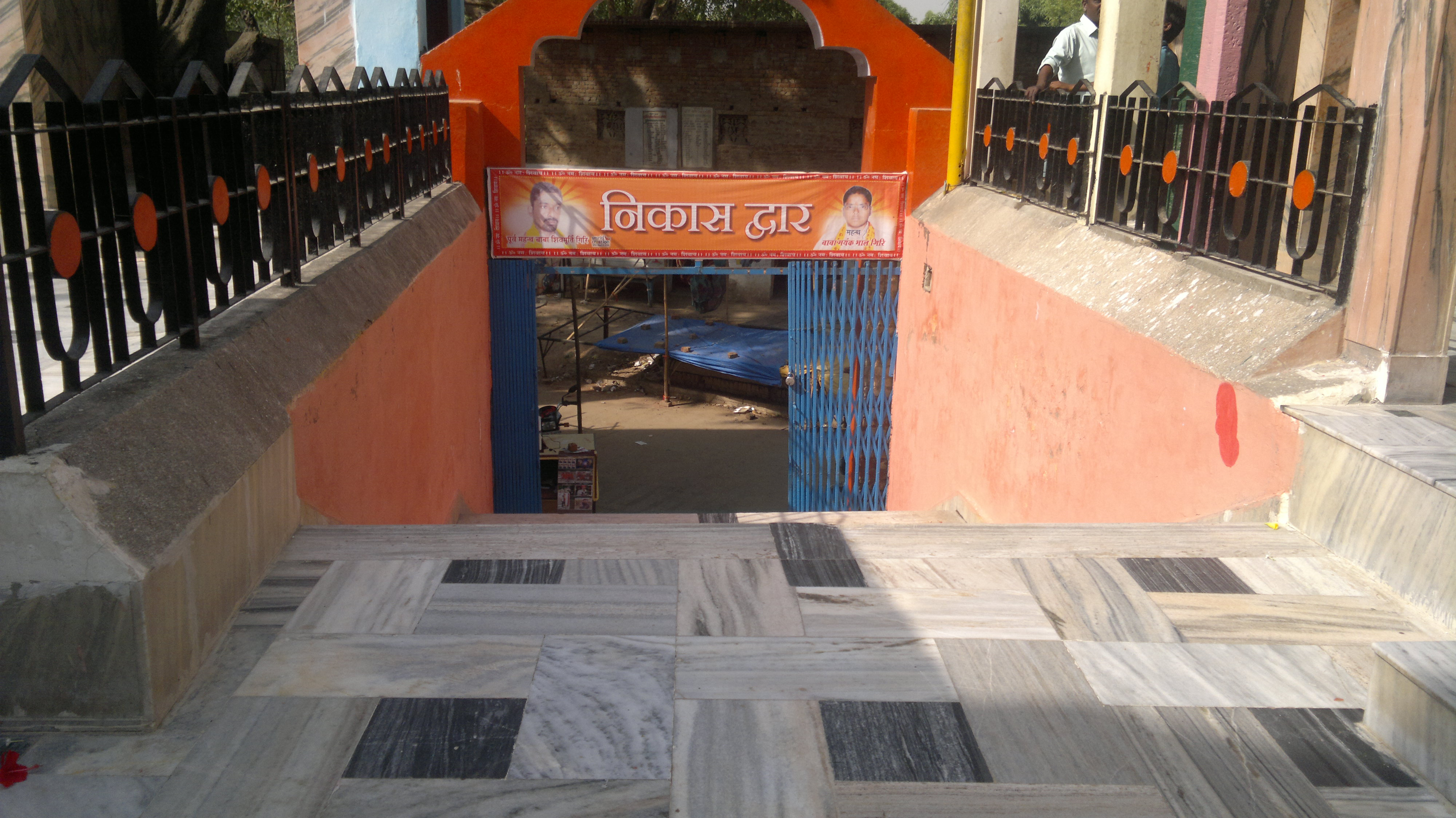

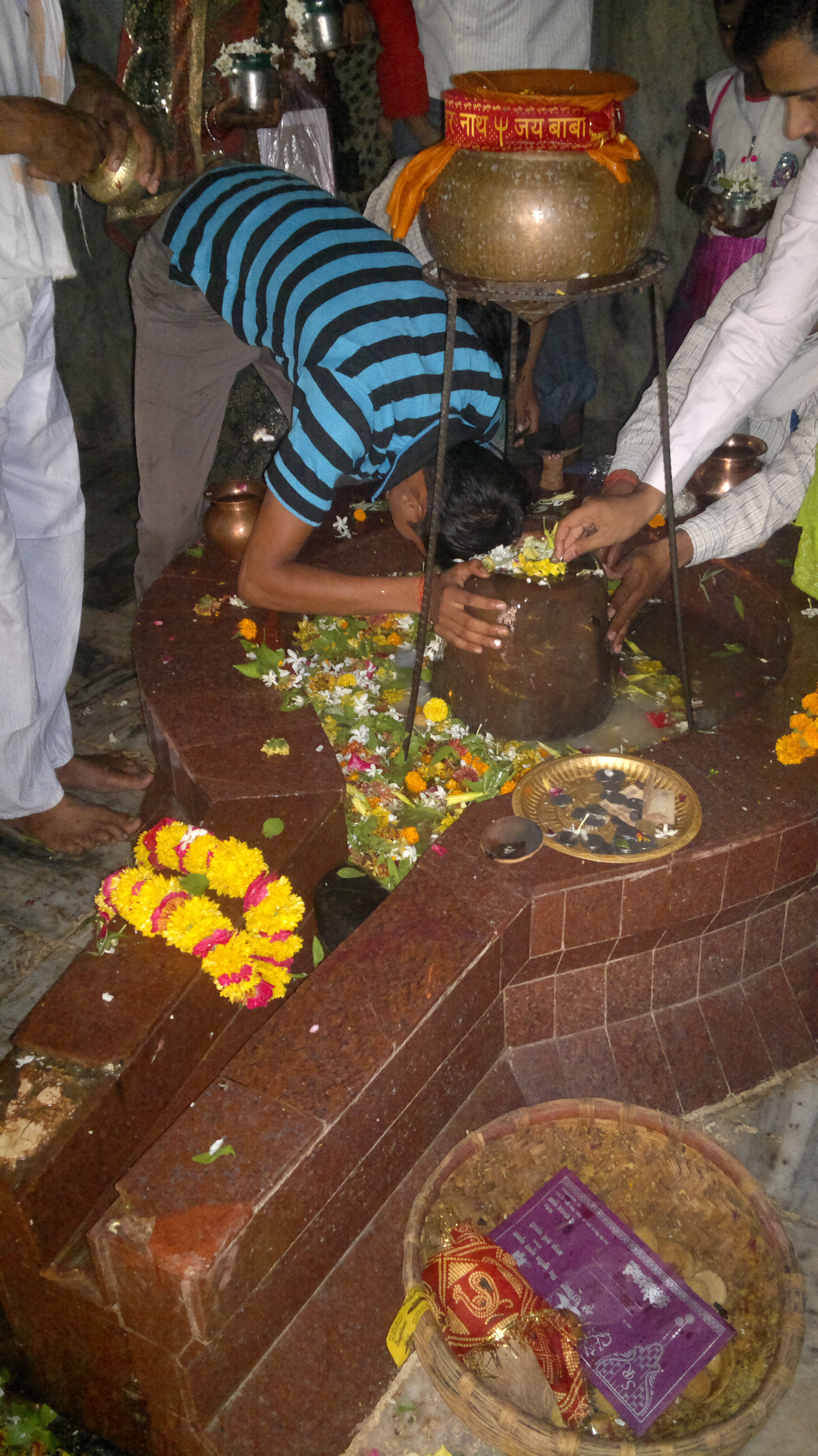
