= Chandikan Dham =

Hindu temple in Uttar Pradesh, India

Chandikan Devi Temple is a Hindu temple of goddess Kali located Sandwa village at a distance of about 24 km from Pratapgarh on Pratapgarh-Raipur Road, about 40 km from Sultanpur & 101 from Ayodhya in Pratapgarh District, Uttar Pradesh.

A religious fair is held on every Tuesday and considerable trade is carried out in the fair. On 8th-9th day of Chaitra and Ashwin a great fair is also held here. The biggest annual fair is held on 'Budhwa Mangal' day and Chandika Mahotsava is celebrated on 8th-9th day of Navratri month.

== See also ==
- Belha Devi Temple
- Nandmahar Dham
- Mata Mawai Dham
- Lodi Baba Mandir
