= Ulta Gadha Dham =

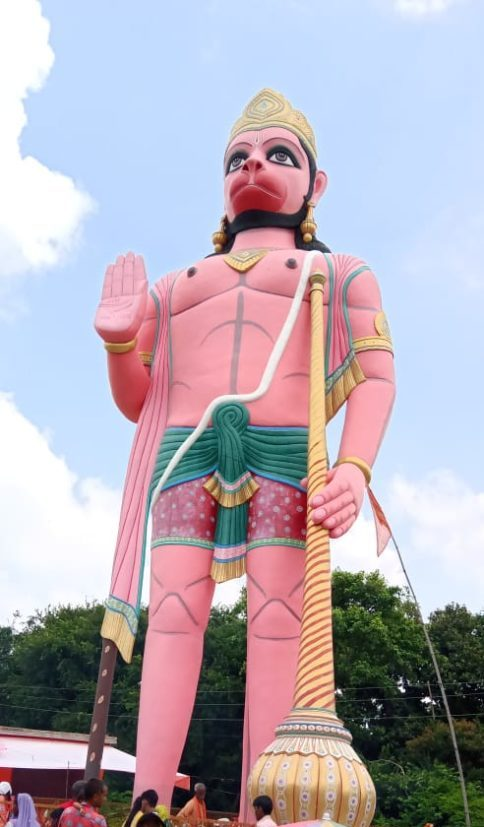

Religion
- Affiliation: Hinduism
- District: Amethi district
- Deity: Hanuman Ji

Location
- Location: Gauriganj
- State: Uttar Pradesh
- Country: India

Architecture
- Type: Hindu temple architecture

Ulta Gadha Dham, which is also called Garha Mafi, is a Hindu temple about eight kilometers from Gauriganj.

== See also ==
- Mata Mawai Dham
- Lodi Baba Mandir
- Nandmahar Dham
- Durgan Dham Temple
