= Lalganj Assembly constituency =

Lalganj Assembly constituency may refer to these electoral constitutencies in India:

- Lalganj, Bihar Assembly constituency
- Lalganj, Uttar Pradesh Assembly constituency

== See also ==
- Lalganj (disambiguation)
