= Annu Shukla =

Indian politician

Member of the Bihar Legislative Assembly
- In office 2010-2015
- Preceded by: Vijay Kumar Shukla
- Succeeded by: Raj Kumar Sah
- Constituency: Lalganj

Personal details
- Party: Rashtriya Janata Dal
- Other political affiliations: Janata Dal (United)
- Spouse: Vijay Kumar Shukla

Annu Shukla is an Indian politician. She was a member of the Bihar Legislative Assembly from Lalganj as a member of Janata Dal (United). She is the wife of Vijay Kumar Shukla.
