= Antu railway station =

Railway station in Uttar Pradesh, India

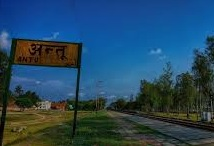

General information
- Location: Pratapgarh, Uttar Pradesh; India
- Coordinates: 26.03°N 81.90°E
- Elevation: 101 metres (331 ft)
- Operator: Northern Railway

Construction
- Structure type: Standard (on-ground station)
- Parking: Yes

Other information
- Status: Functioning
- Station code: ANTU
- Zone(s): Northern Railway
- Division(s): Lucknow, Uttar Pradesh
Location
- Location within India Location within Uttar Pradesh

Antu railway station (station code ANTU) is a small railway station located in Pratapgarh, in the Indian state of Uttar Pradesh. The closest major railway station is Sahajipur Halt and closest airport is Bamrauli Airport. It belongs to Northern Railway, Pratapgarh, Uttar Pradesh.

== Major trains ==
- Kanpur–Pratapgarh InterCity Express
- Varanasi–Lucknow Passenger
- Lucknow–Pratapgarh Passenger
- Prayag–Lucknow Passenger
- Bareilly–Prayag Express
- Ramnagar–Varanasi Passenger
- Kashi V Express

== See also ==
- Northern Railway zone
- Jhansi Junction railway station
