= Sangramgarh, Uttar Pradesh =

Coordinates: 25°53′N 81°29′E

Sangramgarh is a small town in Rampur Sangramgarh Mandal, Pratapgarh District, Uttar Pradesh, India.

== Geography ==
Sangramgarh is located 41.2 km from its district main city Pratapgarh and located 122 km from its state capital Lucknow.

Major towns nearby: Babaganj (6.6 km), Lalganj (13.6 km), Kalakankar (13.8 km), Kunda (14.9 km)

Nearby villages: Bakol (2 km), Naudiya (4 km), Asogi (1.3 km), Hisampur (2 km), Gosai ka purwa(1.3 km), Lalupatti (2.1 km), Kasbalatifpur (4.8 km).

== Notable people ==
Pramod Tewari, who is a Member of Indian National Congress and senior party leader, currently MLA from Rampur Khaas Constituency. He won the election for the ninth consecutive time in the 2012 Uttar Pradesh Assembly Elections. Tewari's name has already figured in the Guinness World Records for winning eight consecutive times from a single party and from single symbol
