= Adapur Assembly constituency =

Coordinates: 26°55′08″N 84°55′56″E

Adapur
- Former constituency for the Bihar Legislative Assembly

Constituency details
- Country: India
- Region: East India
- State: Bihar
- District: Purvi Champaran
- Lok Sabha constituency: Bettiah
- Established: 1951
- Abolished: 2010

Adapur Assembly constituency was an assembly constituency in Purvi Champaran district in the Indian state of Bihar.

== Overview ==
It was part of Bettiah Lok Sabha constituency.

As a consequence of the orders of the Delimitation Commission of India, Adapur Assembly constituency ceased to exist in 2010.

== Members of Vidhan Sabha ==
Year	Member	Party
1952	Ram Sunder Tiwari	Indian National Congress
1957	Brajnandan Sharma	Independent
1962	Rambaran Prasad	Praja Socialist Party
1967	Ahmed Karim	Independent
1969	Premchand	Indian National Congress
1972	Ramprit Rai	Indian National Congress
1977	Ramprit Rai	Indian National Congress
1980	Sharmimudin Hasmi	Janata Party (Secular)
1985	Hari Shanker Yadav	Indian National Congress
1990	Brij Behari Prasad	Janata Dal
1995	Brij Behari Prasad	Janata Dal
1998^	Shyam Bihari Prasad	Rashtriya Janata Dal
2000	Birendra Prasad Kushwaha	Independent
2005	Shyam Bihari Prasad	Janata Dal (United)
2005	Shyam Bihari Prasad	Janata Dal (United)
2010 onwards: See Narkatiya
