= Rajkumar Sah =

Indian politician (born 1964)

Member of the Legislative Assembly
- In office 2015–2020
- Preceded by: Vijay Kumar Shukla
- Succeeded by: Sanjay Kumar Singh
- Constituency: Lalganj

Personal details
- Born: 1 January 1964 (age 62)
- Party: Lok Janshakti Party

Rajkumar Sah (born 1 January 1964) is an Indian politician. He is elected as a Member of the Legislative Assembly in 2015 on the ticket of Lok Janshakti Party from Lalganj constituency with a huge margin of 20,293 votes against Vijay Kumar Shukla.

== Political career ==
He is active in social service when he was 20 years old. In 2000 he fought an election against Bahubali Munna Shukla on the ticket of Rashtriya Janata Dal. The total vote collected by Rajkumar Sah was 80842 which created history in Lalganj constituency. He got the party ticket from Rashtriya Janata Dal in 2000 to fight election from Lalganj constituency.

In 2005 again he fought on the ticket of RJD and in 2010 fought election independent from the same constituency and got huge public support which enabled him to earn approx 40000 votes.

In 2015, got the ticket from Lok Janshakti Party and won the election with 83000 votes in his favor. By seeing his performance and honest political character Chirag Paswan appointed him as the vice president of the party in Bihar state.

== Personal life ==
He belongs to a farmer family and his father Late Sri Rajendra Prasad Sahu was a farmer and a vegetable seed businessman. Mr. Sah completed his education in Bihar and is active in politics since 1995. Apart from politics, he is a farmer and active in the farming and seed industry. His native town is Lalganj (Vaishali) village Sahpur Kashim.
