= Sanjay Kumar Singh (BJP politician) =

Indian politician (born 1968)

Member of Bihar Legislative Assembly
- Incumbent
- Assumed office November 2020
- Preceded by: Rajkumar Sah
- Constituency: Lalganj
- Chief Minister: Nitish Kumar; Samrat Choudhary

Personal details
- Born: 30 March 1968 (age 58)
- Party: Bharatiya Janata Party
- Occupation: MLA

Sanjay Kumar Singh is an Indian politician, currently a member of Bharatiya Janata Party and a Member of the Legislative Assembly (India) from Lalganj, Bihar (Vidhan Sabha constituency).
