= Durgan Dham Temple =

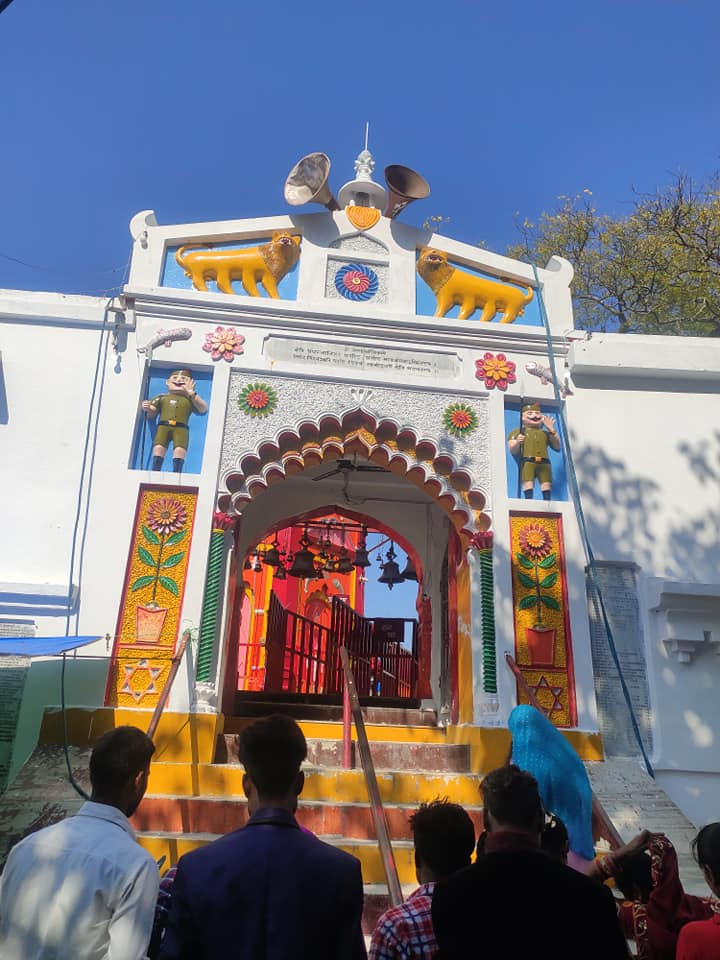
- Durgan Dham Temple

Religion
- Affiliation: Hinduism
- District: Amethi district
- Deity: Goddess Durga
- Festivals: Every Monday & Navratri

Location
- Location: Rohnsi Bujurg, Gauriganj
- State: Uttar Pradesh
- Country: India
- Interactive map of Durgan Dham Temple

Architecture
- Type: Hindu temple architecture

Durgan Dham Temple or Durgan Mandir is a Goddess Durga Mata temple located at Lugri, Rohnsi Bujurg, Gauriganj, Amethi district in Uttar Pradesh, India. A big fair is organized here every Monday or Friday along with Chaitra Navratri and Kuwar Navratri of Maa Durga Bhavani Dham, while lakhs of devotees from far and wide come here for the darshan and blessings of Maa Bhavani, people believe that by coming here, Maa Bhavani. Siddha Peeth Durgan Dham, located at a distance of 5 km from the city of Gauriganj, is a holy pilgrimage site of mythological Hindu religion, here the idols found in ancient times in the temple courtyard provide a great amount of authenticity to the fact. In Navratri, there is a crowd of devotees of the mother, as well as every Monday, the crowd in the form of a fair comes to see the mother, the lake located behind the temple, and the beautiful lotus flowers blooming in it attract people. A huge crowd gathers here on the occasion of Chaitra Navratri and Shardiya Navratri. This temple is being considered to be renovated.

Notable visitors, including Rahul Gandhi, Smriti Irani, come to Durgan Dham Temple.

== Transportation ==
Chaudhary Charan Singh Airport, Lucknow is the nearest airport to reach Durgan Dham Temple. Gauriganj railway station is an important railway station which is served by trains from all major cities across the country. Private taxis are available from travel, auto-rickshaws, cycle rickshaws and Tempos are also readily available.

== See also ==
- Nandmahar Dham
- Lodi Baba Mandir
- Mata Mawai Dham
- Ulta Gadha Dham
