= Lalganj Ajhara =

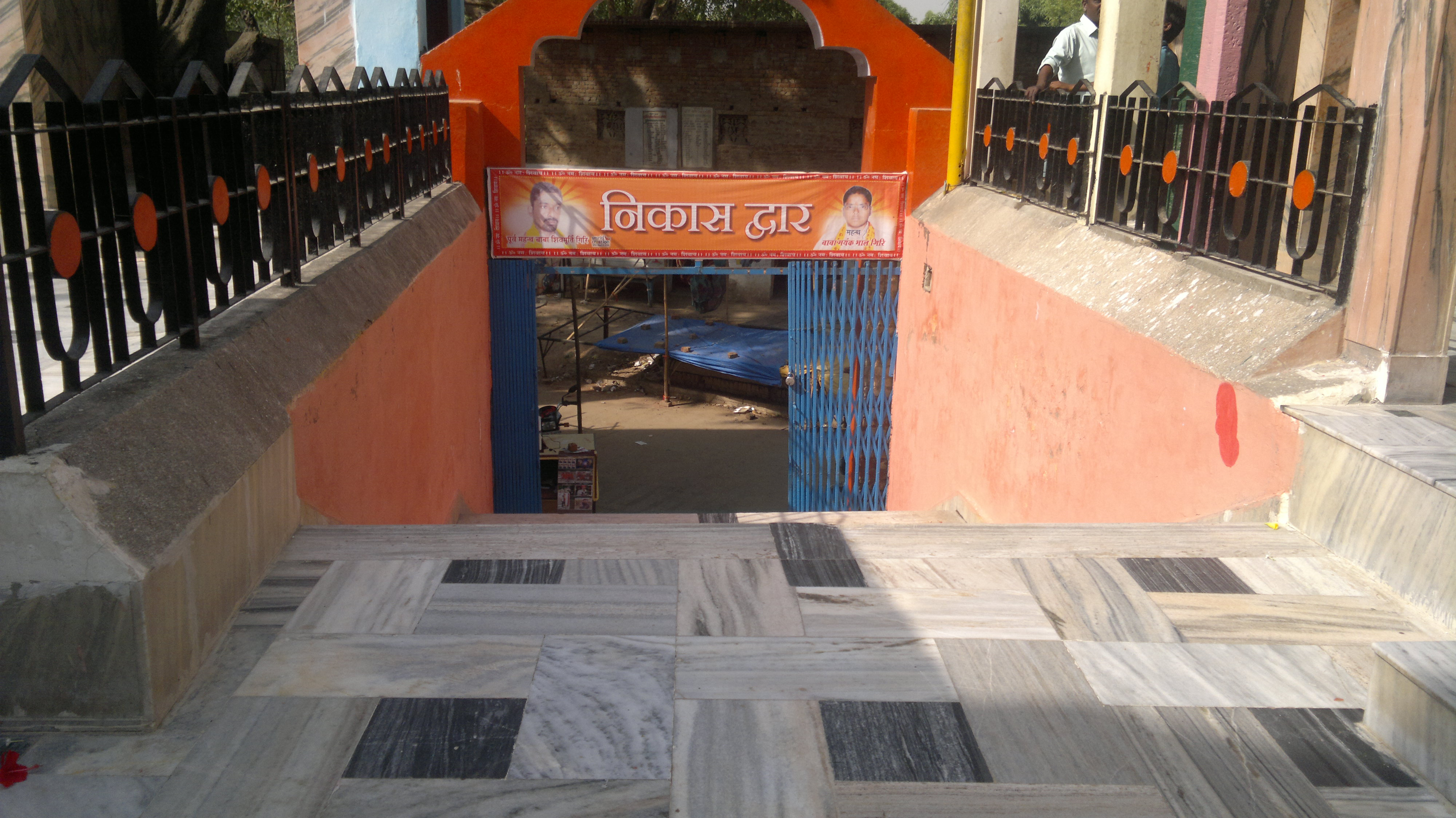
- Ghuisarnath Temple at Kumbhapur village in Lalganj

- Location of Lalganj Ajhara in Uttar Pradesh
- Country: India
- State: Uttar Pradesh
- District: Pratapgarh

Government
  - Type: Tehsil
  - MLA: Aradhana Mishra
- Time zone: UTC+5:30 (Indian Standard Time)
- Postal Code: 230132
- Telephone Code: 05341
- Vehicle Registration: UP 72
- Website: Ghuisarnath Dham

The Lalganj Ajhara is a Tehsil in the Pratapgarh district of the Indian state of Uttar Pradesh. It is located 36 km away from the Pratapgarh headquarters and 142 km from the capital of Uttar Pradesh, Lucknow.

== See also ==
- Ghuisarnath Temple
