= Lalganj (community development block) =

Community development block in Vaishali district, Bihar, India

Lalganj लालगंज
- Community Development Block
- Location in Bihar, India
- Coordinates: 25.873818°N 85.179735°E
- Country: India
- State: Bihar
- District: vaishali
- District Sub-division: Hajipur
- Anchal: Lalganj
- Vidhan Sabha constituency: Lalganj

Government
  - Type: Community development block

Population (2001)
  - Total: 203,729

Languages
  - Official: Hindi
- Time zone: UTC+5:30 (IST)
- ISO 3166 code: IN-BR

Lalganj ( in Hindi : लालगंज ) is a block in Vaishali district, Bihar state. It is also the birthplace of veteran IPS and former Governor of Kerala and Nagaland Shri Nikhil Kumar Singh.According to census website all blocks in bihar state Nomenclature as C.D.Block ( community development blocks

== major roads ==
SH-74

== villages ==
- Number of Panchayat : 21
- Number of Villages : 92

== Population and communities ==
- Male Population : 105532 (2009 ist.)
- female Population : 98197
- Total Population : 203729
- SC Total Population : 44009
- ST Total Population : 495
- Minority Total Population : 15252
- Population Density : 1345
- Sex Ratio : 930

== public distribution system ==
- Nos of HHs : 31082
- BPL Card Holders : 32880
- Antodaya Card Holders : 6937
- Annapurna Card Holders : 238
- APL : 17289
- Nos of Fair Price Shops: 104

== Education ==
- literacy rate : 51% (2001 ist.)
- male literacy rate : 63%
- Female literacy rate : 38%

=== School ===
- Primary School : 101 (2009 ist.)
- Upper Primary School : 83

== Banking ==
- number of bank : 6
