= Brij Behari Prasad =

Indian politician

Brij Bihari Prasad

Cabinet Minister Government of Bihar
- In office 1995–1998
- Ministry & Departments: Science & Technology; Energy
- Chief Minister: Lalu Prasad Yadav (1995-1997); Rabri Devi (1997-1998)

Deputy Minister Government of Bihar
- In office 1990–1995
- Ministry & Departments: Rural Development
- Chief Minister: Lalu Prasad Yadav

Member of Bihar Legislative Assembly
- In office 1990–1998
- Preceded by: Hari Shanker Yadav
- Succeeded by: Shyam Bihari Prasad
- Constituency: Adapur

Personal details
- Born: July 20, 1949 Bihar, India
- Died: June 13, 1998 (aged 48) IGIMS, Patna, India
- Party: Rashtriya Janata Dal
- Spouse: Rama Devi

Brij Behari Prasad, also spelled Braj Bihari Prasad (died 13 June 1998) was an Indian gangster and politician. A member of the Rashtriya Janata Dal (RJD) (then Janata Dal), Prasad served as Minister for Science and Technology in the Government of Bihar. He was under judicial questioning for his office's alleged involvement in corrupt admissions to technical institutes and was murdered on 13 June 1998 at the Indira Gandhi Institute of Medical Sciences in Patna, where he was undergoing treatment . It was claimed that his death was in retribution for his involvement in assassination of gangster Chhottan Shukla and five other people, who were killed on 4 December 1994, while returning home from a campaign organised in context of 1995 Bihar Legislative Assembly elections. Shukla was a gangster from the Bhumihar community, whereas Prasad was a kalwar leader. Supporters of Prasad were thought to be responsible for the killing of Shukla.

== Political career ==
Prasad served as science and technology minister in Rabri Devi's government and also as energy minister in Janata Dal government in Bihar. He was known for his Strong Godfather image and was popular among OBCs and downtrodden in his constituency. A close aide of Lalu Prasad Yadav, the influence of Prasad was often used by the Janata Dal to change the voting behaviour in the areas of his influence. The use of money and muscle power was evident in those days and various political parties including the Indian National Congress relied upon influential politicians to ensure victory. Prasad was allegedly involved in the assassination of Devendranath Dubey, a Samajwadi Party MLA and member of Motihari Lok Sabha constituency in 1996. The assassination preceded winning of Motihari constituency election by Prasad's wife Rama Devi. Dubey himself was a proclaimed absconder. The influence of Prasad was witnessed from east Champaran to Muzaffarpur district of Bihar. Author Ranbir Sammadar credits him for ending the crime empire of Devendra Dubey—the Indian National Congress leader who later shifted his allegiance to Samajwadi Party.

According to local media outlets of Bihar, Prasad ensured the victory of several backward caste candidates against the upper-caste strongmen who dominated their respective constituencies due to their influence and muscle power. These include Munna Shukla, who was defeated by Prasad's nominee Kedar Gupta and Raghunath Pandey who was defeated by Bijendra Chowdhary from Muzaffarpur constituency. The nominees of Prasad viz Basawan Bhagat, Maheswar Yadav and Ramvichar Rai also emerged victorious from their respective constituencies. The climax of his political influence was witnessed after his wife, Rama Devi defeated Radha Mohan Singh from Motihari.

== Assassination ==
Prasad was also known for his rivalry with Chhotan Shukla— a gangster and leader of Bihar People's Party of Anand Mohan Singh. Shukla was killed while he was returning from his election campaign by the rivals, who were allegedly working for Prasad. Prasad was earlier under judicial questioning for his office's alleged involvement in BECEE scam, and was getting treatment in Indira Gandhi Institute of Medical Science, Patna. While he was taking a stroll outside his ward surrounded by the commandos of Bihar military police, a man approached him for getting his favour in proper treatment of his relative. Prasad ordered one of his men to talk to a doctor to ensure proper treatment to the man's relative, and moved towards a badly lit corner of parking space. While the commandos approached him towards the parking space, an ambassador car stopped near him and a few unidentified gunmen opened fire upon Prasad and his men. Prasad and three personnel were shot dead on the spot and another one ran away. The dead also included his personal bodyguard, Lahmeshwar Shah, who was also killed on the spot.

== See also ==
- Caste politics in India
- Ashok Mahto gang
- List of caste based violence in Bihar
- Surajbhan Singh
- Shri Prakash Shukla
- Vijay Kumar Shukla
