= Vijay Kumar Shukla =

Indian politician and criminal

Member of Bihar Legislative Assembly
- In office 2000–2010
- Preceded by: Yogendra Prasad Sahu
- Succeeded by: Annu Shukla
- Constituency: Lalganj

Personal details
- Born: 12 May 1969 (age 57) Lalganj, Vaishali, Bihar, India
- Party: Rashtriya Janata Dal
- Other political affiliations: Janata Dal United Lok Janshakti Party Independent
- Spouse: Annu Shukla
- Relations: Late Kaushlendra Kumar Shukla alias Chottan (elder brother) Late Awadhesh Kumar Shukla alias Bhutkun (elder brother) Man Mardan Shukla alias Lallan (younger brother)
- Children: 3
- Parent: Late Ramdas Shukla (father)
- Education: Bihar University
- Nickname: Munna Shukla

Vijay Kumar Shukla, also known as Munna Shukla, is a former Member of the Legislative Assembly (MLA) from Bihar. He has been elected on three occasions to the Bihar Legislative Assembly. He served a jail term for murder. Later He was Acquitted & again convicted in Brij Behari Prasad murder case in 2024 by Supreme Court.

== Family and education ==
He is the brother of Chhotan Shukla, a notorious gang member who was assassinated in 1994, allegedly by the henchmen of Brij Bihari Prasad, a minister belonging to OBC Bania caste, who was a strongman from Lalu Prasad Yadav's Rashtriya Janata Dal. His another brother Bhutkun Shukla who was allegedly responsible for instigating a mob for killing G. Krishnaiah, the District Magistrate (DM) of Gopalganj during Chhotan's funeral procession and is now also dead. His wife, Annu Shukla, is an MLA from his former seat.

== Political career ==
Shukla was first elected a MLA from the Lalganj constituency in the 2000 as Independent Candidate. Again won in February 2005 Bihar elections as a Lok Janshakti Party candidate. In the October elections of that year he won again after switching to be a Janata Dal (United) candidate.

Shukla later stood as an JD(U) candidate for the Lok Sabha constituency of Vaishali. There he lost to the national vice-president of the Rashtriya Janata Dal, Raghuvansh Prasad Singh. He was debarred from election as he was convicted in the Brij Behari Prasad murder case along with Surajbhan Singh. But in 2014 he was Acquitted by highcourt along with other's.In 2024 he again convicted in Brij Behari Prasad Murder Case by Supreme Court along with Mantu Tiwari.

In 2024 Lok Sabha Election he was defeated by Veena Devi of Lok Janshakti Party candidate.

== Crime ==
The criminal careers of Shukla and of Anand Mohan Singh, both of which were intertwined with politics, ran in parallel for many years and were of equal note. Tehelka said in 2007 that

it was his muscleman image that made Mohan’s name synonymous with terror in Bihar’s poverty-ridden Saharsa-Supaul belt for the past 20 years. He and Munna Shukla faced several criminal cases, many of them for murder, in various courts across Bihar. While Shukla still remains a dreaded figure around Muzaffarpur and Vaishali districts in north Bihar, Mohan is notorious in the Saharsa-Supaul belt as a criminal and sometimes as a kind of folk hero.

The two overlapped completely in 1994 at the time of the lynching of a Dalit district magistrate near to Muzaffarpur during the funeral cortege of Chhotan Shukla. In 2007 they were sentenced to death for their involvement in the murder but Shukla's sentence was later overturned on appeal, when it was determined that he was present but uninvolved, and Singh's sentence was reduced to life imprisonment.

While in jail for that offence in 2012, Shukla was studied for and was awarded a PhD by Babasaheb Bhimrao Ambedkar Bihar University.
