= Lodi Baba Mandir =

Hindu temple in Uttar Pradesh, India

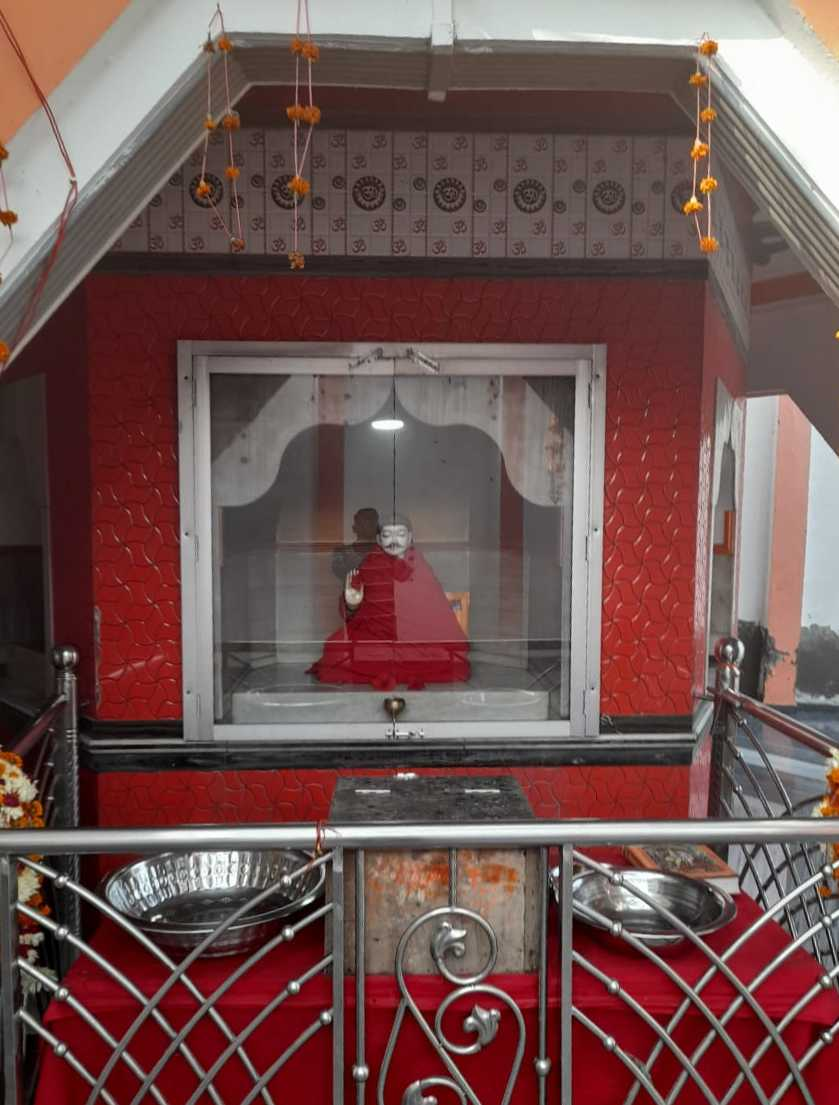

Religion
- Affiliation: Hinduism
- District: Amethi district
- Festival: Every Thursday

Location
- Location: Gauriganj
- State: Uttar Pradesh
- Country: India

Architecture
- Type: Hindu temple architecture

Lodi Baba Mandir or Lodi Baba Dham is a Hindu temple located at Gauriganj, Amethi district Headquarters, Raibareli - Sultapur Road in Uttar Pradesh, India. The temple is located at a distance of about 125 km (78 mi) from the state capital Lucknow, 550 km (340 mi) from the national capital Delhi, and 100 km (62 mi) from Ayodhya. This temple is dedicated to Lodi Veer Baba.

Lodi Baba temple is near the drain west of Gauriganj market, also named Lodi Nala. Famous among the local people, it is also the center of their faith. However, the place is still a rudimentary devasthan and is a reminder for the passengers of the trains coming to Gauriganj.

== Transportation ==
Chaudhary Charan Singh Airport, Lucknow is the nearest airport to reach Lodi Baba Mandir. Gauriganj railway station is an important railway station which is served by trains from all major cities across the country. Lodi Baba Mandir is on National Highway 128 (India) from Raibareli to Tanda. It is well connected by road.

== See also ==
- Nandmahar Dham
- Ulta Gadha Dham
- Ghuisarnath Temple
- Durgan Dham Temple
- Mata Mawai Dham
