= Nandmahar Dham =

Hindu temple in Uttar Pradesh, India

Nanadmahar Dham
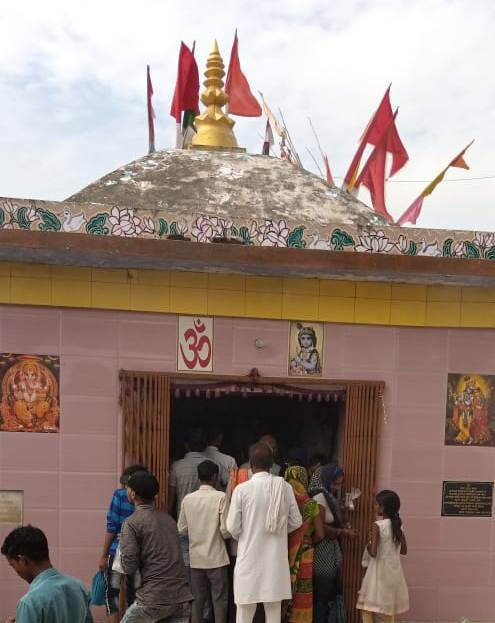
- Baba Nandmahar Dham; Nandmahar Dham at Musafirkhana, Gauriganj, Amethi

Religion
- Affiliation: Hinduism
- District: Amethi district
- Deity: Krishna

Location
- Location: Musafirkhana, Gauriganj
- State: Uttar Pradesh
- Country: India
- Interactive map of Nanadmahar Dham

Architecture
- Type: Hindu temple architecture

Nandmahar Dham or Baba Nandmahar Dham is a Hindu temple located at Musafirkhana, Gauriganj in Amethi District. Nandmahar Dham temple is dedicated to Krishna, Balram, Nand Baba and Vasudeva. This temple is situated at a distance of about 114 km (71 mi) from the state capital Lucknow and 630 km (390 mi) from the national capital New Delhi.

People from various states like Rajasthan, Madhya Pradesh, Maharashtra, Punjab, Haryana, Chhattisgarh and Delhi attend the fair on Kartik Purnima. Notable visitors to the Nandmahar Dham temple include, former Prime Minister Rajiv Gandhi along with Mulayam Singh, Balaram Yadav, Lalu Prasad Yadav, Akhilesh Yadav, Sonia Gandhi and Rahul Gandhi.

== Transportation ==
The nearest airport is Chaudhary Charan Singh International Airport and Gauriganj railway station is the nearest railway station. The closest UPSRTC bus stand is Gauriganj. Private taxis and auto rickshawasare available.

== See also ==
- Chandikan Devi Temple
- Belha Devi Temple
- Ghuisarnath Temple
- Lodi Baba Mandir
- Durgan Dham Temple
- Mata Mawai Dham
