= Pratapgarh, Uttar Pradesh =

District of Uttar Pradesh, India

Pratapgarh
- Town
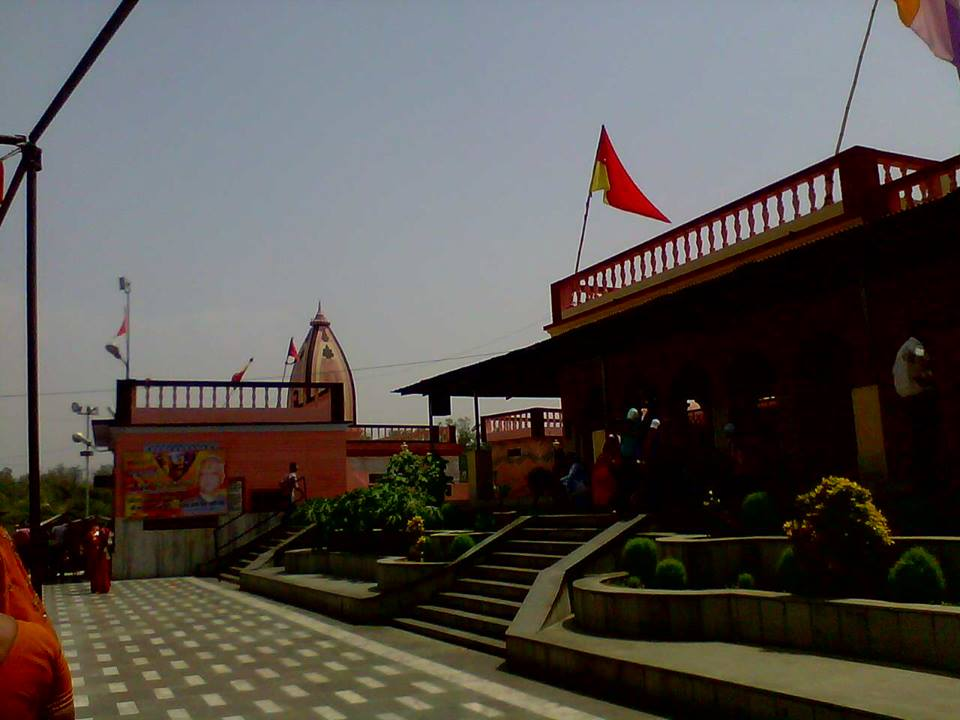
- Belha Devi Temple Pratapgarh

- Location in Uttar Pradesh, India Pratapgarh (India) Pratapgarh (Asia)
- Coordinates: 25.897°N 81.945°E
- Country: India
- State: Uttar Pradesh
- District: Pratapgarh

Government
  - District magistrate: Sanjeev Ranjan
- Elevation: 137 m (449 ft)

Population (2011)
  - Total: 91,204

Language
  - Official: Hindi
  - Additional official: Urdu
- Time zone: UTC+5:30 (IST)
- PIN: 230001-02
- Telephone code: +91 05342
- Vehicle registration: UP-72
- Sex Ratio: 957 ♂/♀
- Website: pratapgarh.nic.in

Pratapgarh is a town and municipality in the state of Uttar Pradesh in India. Pratapgarh is the administrative headquarters of Pratapgarh district, part of the Prayagraj division, formerly known as Allahabad.

== Etymology ==
Pratapgarh was the name of a fort built by Pratap Bahadur Singh (1628–1682), a local ruler, at Rampur. Later, the area around the fort started to be known as Pratapgarh.

To distinguish it from nearby Bela Pratapgarh, Pratapgarh is sometimes also referred to as "Pratapgarh city".

== History ==
According to local tradition, Pratapgarh was founded in 1628 on top of the ruins of an old town called Aror. This is identified with the pattalā (district) of Arureśa mentioned in an 1107 grant under the Gahadavala dynasty as being next to a district called "Māṇighapura" (identified with present-day Manikpur). Aror is also listed in the Ain-i-Akbari (1590s) as a mahal in the sarkar of Manikpur, with the Somavamshis listed as the main landowners.

== Demographics ==
According to the 2011 census, the Pratapgarh urban area had a total population of 91,204, including Bela Pratapgarh's 76,133 and Pratapgarh NP's 15,071, with a total of 46,960 males and 44,244 females.

=== Religion ===
Religion in Pratapgarh (2011 census)
Religion	Percent
Hinduism	64.58%
Islam	33.28%
Others	2.14%

The majority in Pratapgarh are followers of Hinduism, with Muslims forming the second largest religious group. The town also has significant populations of Christians and Sikhs.

== Economy ==
In 2006, the Ministry of Panchayati Raj named Pratapgarh one of the country's 250 most backward districts (out of a total of 640). It is one of the districts of Uttar Pradesh currently receiving funds from the Backward Regions Grant Fund Programme (BRGF).

Primarily an agrarian district, for a while, Pratapgarh has become a top producer of Aonla (Amla). The district's Aonla is sold across India and internationally, mostly in form of sweets and medicine.

== Attractions ==
=== Bhakti Mandir ===
Bhakti Mandir is a Hindu temple established by Jagadguru Shri Kripalu Ji Maharaj. It is located in Kunda, Pratapgarh. The temple was inaugurated in November 2005. The temple features life-size deities of Shri Radha-Krishna and Shri Sita-Ram. The temple is managed by Jagadguru Kripalu Parishat.

=== Bakhshi Talab ===
This pond is in the Raniganj tehsil of village Hussainpur, which is also known as Pakka Talab or Bakshi Talab. This pond is believed to be before the British era. It is made from cooked lime. It was built by the zamindar (Bakshi Sao). This pond is situated on the Dehlupur Raniganj main road. The water of this pond has not dried up till date and there is a deep well in the middle of the pond, which directly connects this pond with Hades. This is a very big fish in the pond.A separate bath has been made for women to bathe in this pond

=== Bela Devi Temple ===
The Belha Devi Temple is one of the important temples, situated in Pratapgarh, on the banks of River Sai on the western side of the Prayagraj-Ayodhya road. Here, Mother Goddess Belha or 'Belha Mai' is worshiped by devotees.

=== Kisan Devta Mandir ===
Pratapgarh district has the world's first temple dedicated to farmers, named Kisan Devta Mandir. In this district, farmers are revered as gods. The temple was established by Shailendra Yogi, a homoeopathic doctor, in Sarai Mahesh village of Patti tehsil of Pratapgarh in 2015. The six feet tall idol made of sandstone and holding a plough is accompanied by an idol of Kisan Devi.

=== Maa Barahi Devi Dham (Chauharjan Devi) ===
A temple dedicated to Maa Barahi in Pratapgarh. is also known as Chauharjan Devi.

== Transport ==
=== Airport ===
The nearest airport Prayagraj Airport is at a distance of about 55 kilometres.

=== Railways ===
Railway is the main transport form in this district and some junctions are Pratapgarh, Chilbila and Bhupia Mau. Pratapgarh Junction railway station handles 42 trains daily.

=== Road ===
- Prayagraj -Ayodhya Highway (NH-330)
- Lucknow Varanasi highway (NH-31)
- Delhupur Raniganj Patti Akbarpur highway (SH-128)
- Ganga Expressway
- Prayagraj Unchahar Lucknow Highway

== Education ==
=== Schools ===
- Seth M.R. Jaipuria School, Pratapgarh
- St.Anthony's Inter college, Pratapgarh

== Gallery ==
Temples
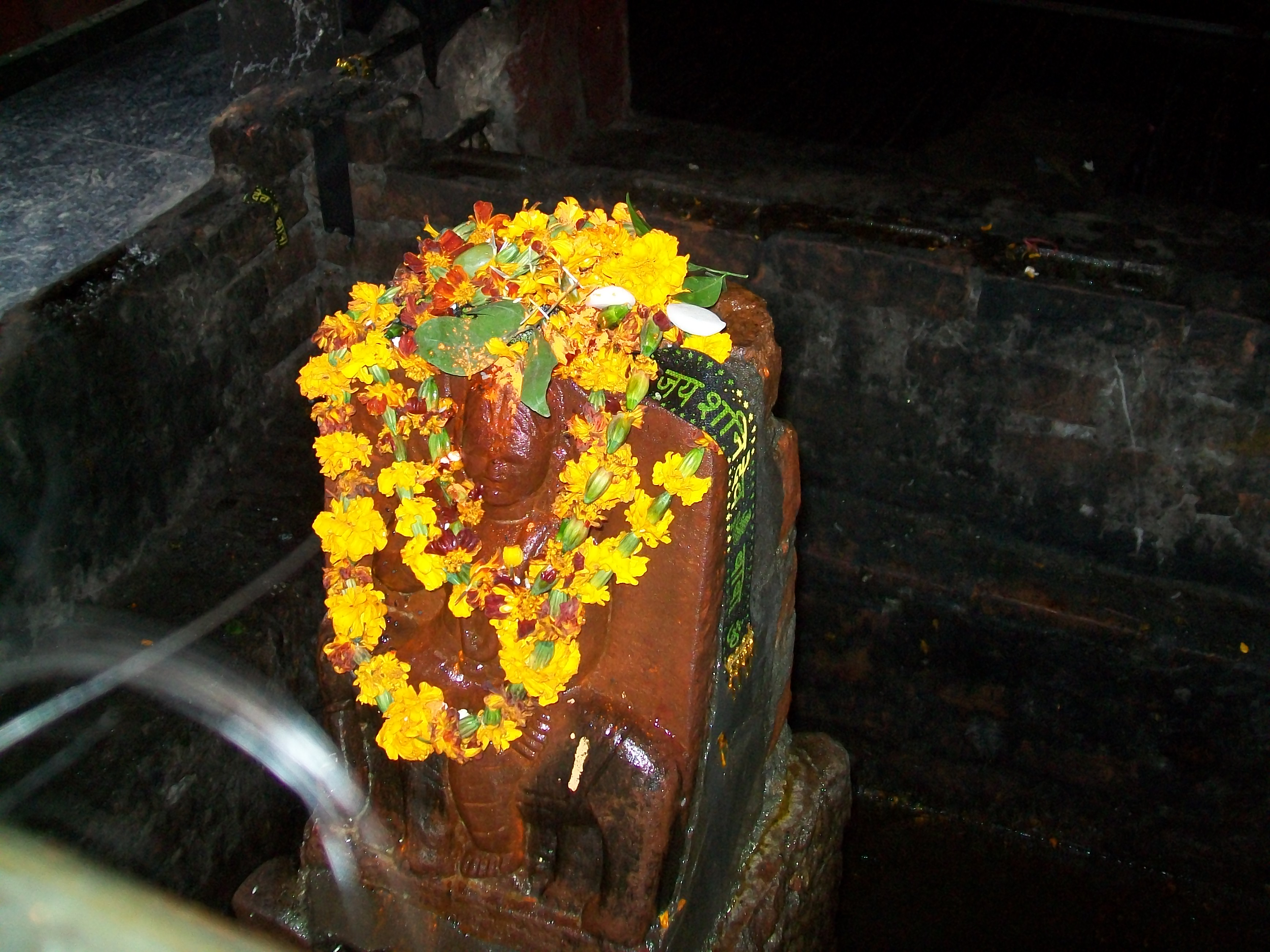
Shani Dev Temple

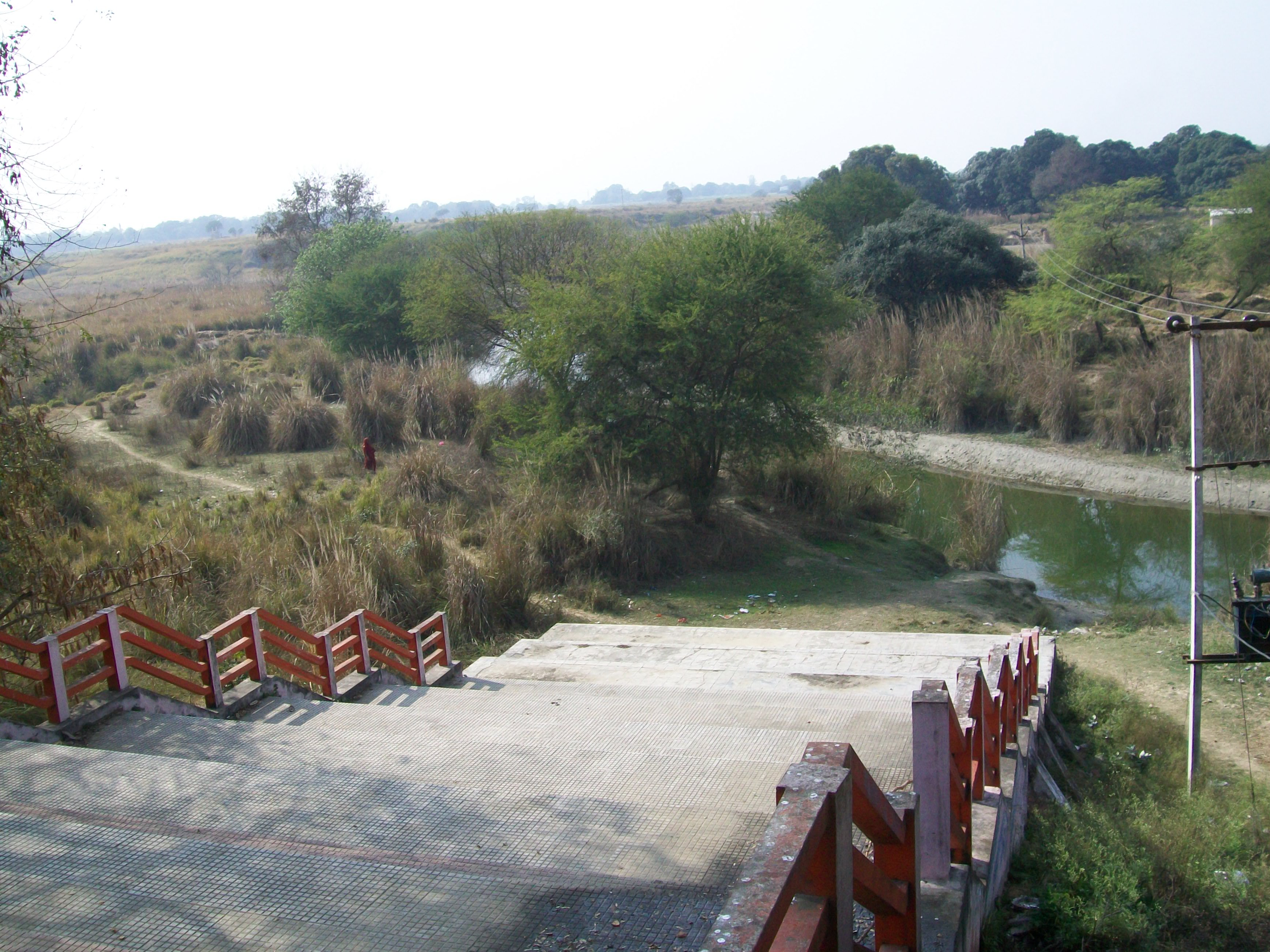
View of river Bakulahi from the Shani Dev Temple

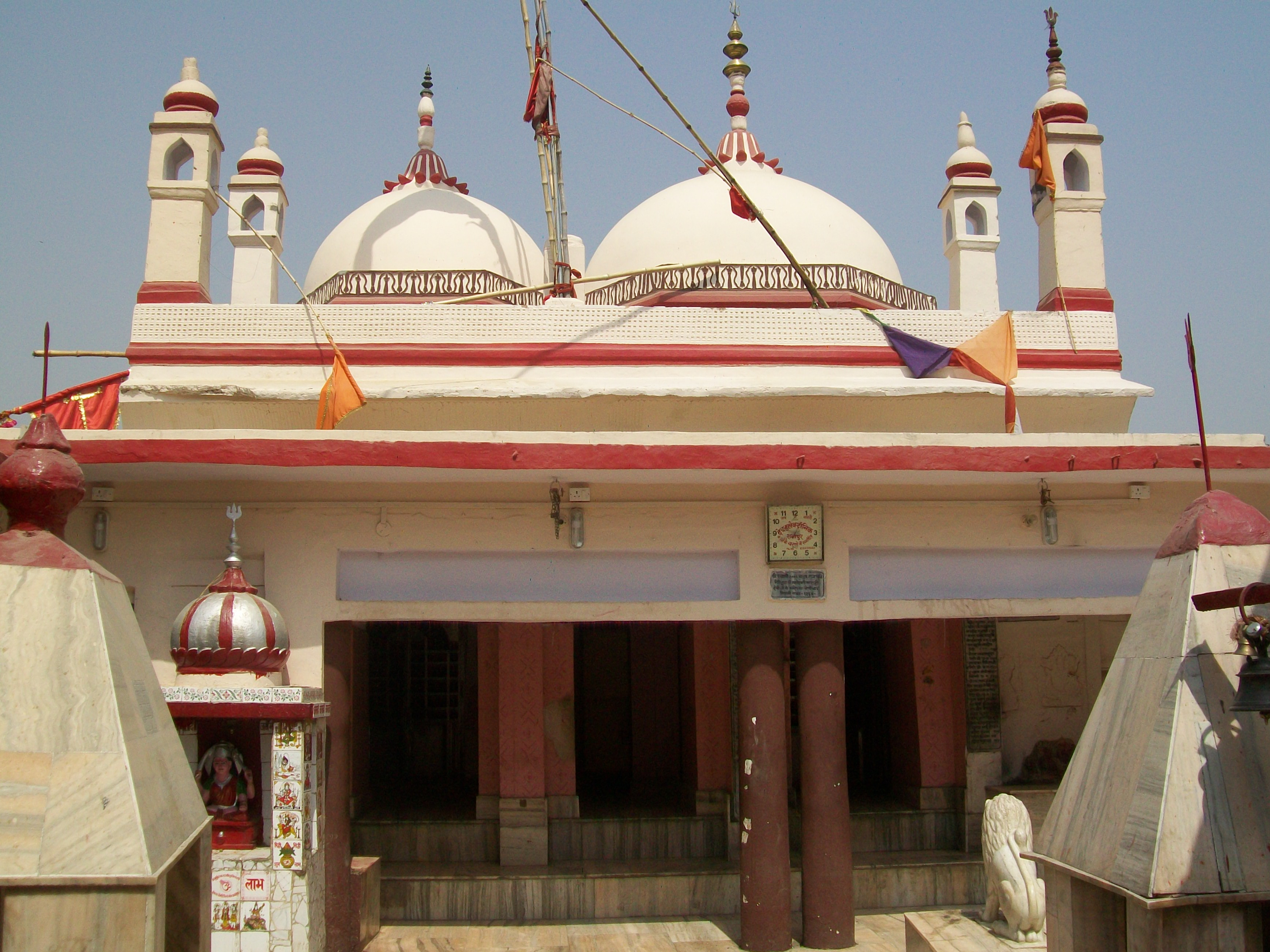
Chauharjan Devi (Maa Barahi) Temple

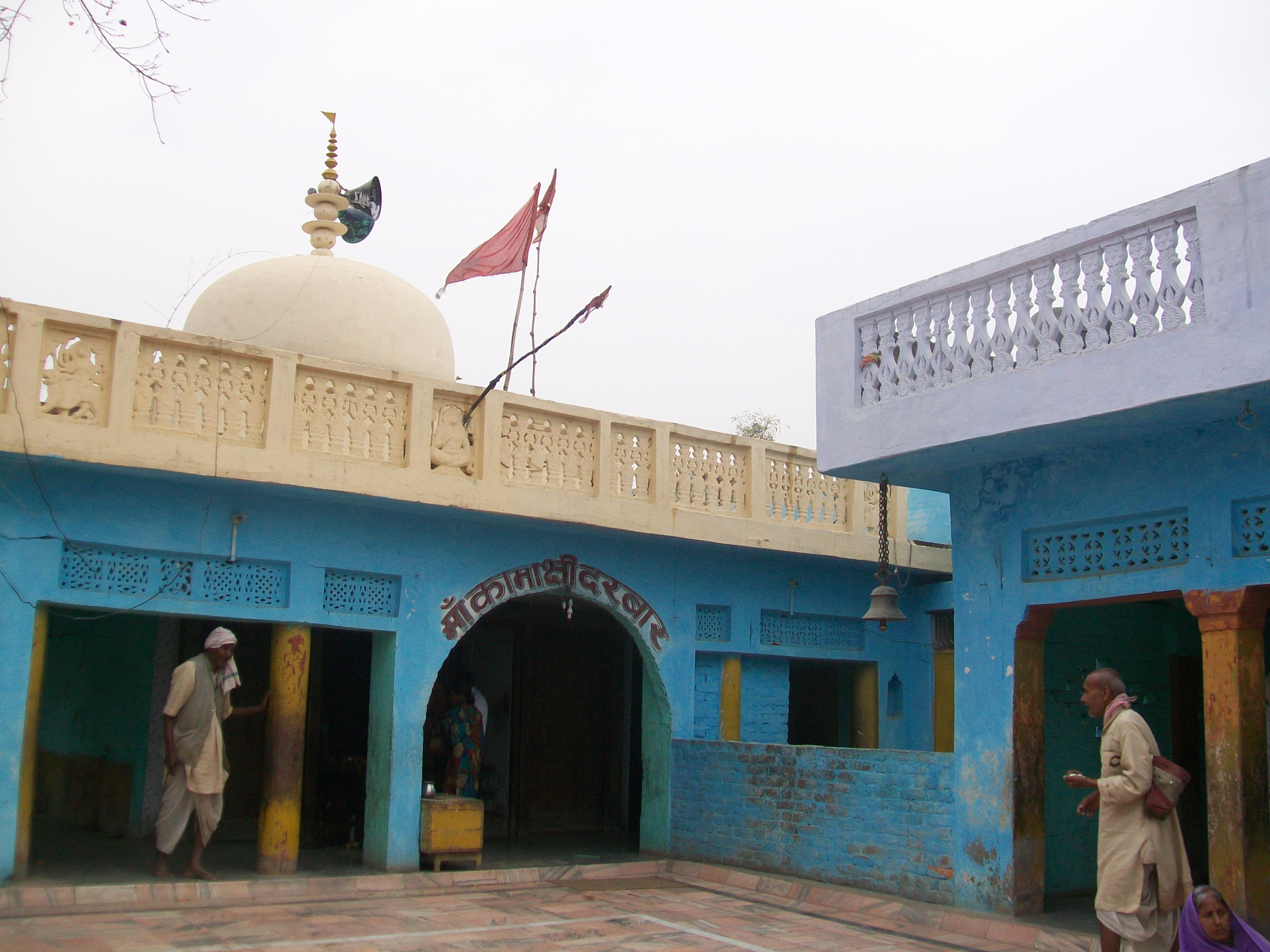
Kamakshi Devi Temple, Kamasin
