= Lalganj, Bihar Assembly constituency =

Coordinates: 25°51′07″N 85°10′46″E

Lalganj, Bihar
- Constituency No. 124 for the Bihar Legislative Assembly

Constituency details
- Country: India
- Region: East India
- State: Bihar
- District: Vaishali
- Lok Sabha constituency: 21. Hajipur (SC)
- Established: 1951
- Total electors: 344,150

Member of Legislative Assembly
- 18th Bihar Legislative Assembly
- Incumbent Sanjay Kumar Singh
- Party: BJP
- Alliance: NDA
- Elected year: 2025
- Preceded by: Mr. Raj Kumar Sah, LJP

Lalganj Assembly constituency is an assembly constituency in Vaishali district in the Indian state of Bihar.

== Overview ==
Since 2008, the Lalganj Assembly constituency comprises Lalganj and Bhagwanpur.zedar community development blocks. It is part of No. 21 Hajipur (Lok Sabha constituency) (SC).

== Members of the Legislative Assembly ==
Year	Name	Party
1952	Laliteshwar Prasad Shahi (Note: Lalganj North)	Indian National Congress
1952	Chandramani Lal Choudhary (Note: Lalganj South)	Indian National Congress
1957	Laliteshwar Prasad Shahi (Note: Lalganj North)	Indian National Congress
1957	Veerchand Patel (Note: Lalganj South)	Indian National Congress
1962	Bateshwar Prasad (Note: Lalganj North)	Independent politician
1962	Veerchand Patel (Note: Lalganj South)	Indian National Congress
1967	Deep Narayan Singh	Indian National Congress
1969	Deep Narayan Singh	Lok Tantrik Congress
1972	Deep Narayan Singh	Indian National Congress
1977	Arun Kumar Sinha	Janata Party
1980	Laliteshwar Prasad Shahi	Indian National Congress
1985	Bharat Prasad Singh	Indian National Congress
1990	Kedar Nath Prasad	Janata Dal
1995	Yogendra Prasad Sahu	Janata Dal
2000	Vijay Kumar Shukla	Independent politician
2005	Vijay Kumar Shukla	Lok Janshakti Party
2005	Vijay Kumar Shukla	Janata Dal (United)
2010	Annu Shukla	Janata Dal (United)
2015	Rajkumar Sah	Lok Janshakti Party
2020	Sanjay Kumar Singh	Bharatiya Janata Party
2025	Sanjay Kumar Singh	Bharatiya Janata Party

== Election results ==
=== 2025 ===
2025 Bihar Legislative Assembly election: Lalganj
Party	Candidate	Votes	%	±%
BJP	Sanjay Kumar Singh	127,650	53.14	+16.26
RJD	Shivani Shukla	95,483	39.75	
Independent	Dhirendra Kumar Mahto	4,441	1.85	
JSP	Amar Kumar Singh	4,215	1.75	
NOTA	None of the above	2,174	0.91	+0.24
Majority		32,167	13.39	−0.32
Turnout		240,205	69.8	+12.15
BJP gain from		Swing	NDA	

=== 2020 ===
2020 Bihar Legislative Assembly election: Lalganj
Party	Candidate	Votes	%	±%
BJP	Sanjay Kumar Singh	70,750	36.88	
INC	Rakesh Kumar	44,451	23.17	
Independent	Vijay Kumar Shukla	27,460	14.32	
LJP	Raj Kumar Sah	11,281	5.88	−40.03
Independent	Gauri Shankar Pandey	5,784	3.02	
Independent	Rakesh Paswan	5,119	2.67	
Independent	Rajan Kumar	2,589	1.35	
Independent	Akhilesh Kumar	2,571	1.34	
RLSP	Dinesh Kumar Kushawha	2,275	1.19	
Independent	Shailendra Kumar Kaushik	1,891	0.99	−3.69
Independent	Kedar Kumar	1,807	0.94	
Independent	Manju Singh	1,774	0.92	
NOTA	None of the above	1,283	0.67	−0.19
Majority		26,299	13.71	+2.19
Turnout		191,815	57.65	+0.9
BJP gain from LJP		Swing		

=== 2015 ===
2015 Bihar Legislative Assembly election: Lalganj
Party	Candidate	Votes	%	±%
LJP	Raj Kumar Sah	80,842	45.91	
JD(U)	Vijay Kumar Shukla	60,549	34.39	
Independent	Shailendra Kumar Kaushik	8,236	4.68	
Independent	Ram Pravesh Pandit	5,264	2.99	
Independent	Sanjeev Ranjan	3,596	2.04	
Independent	Sudhir Kumar Singh	2,538	1.44	
CPI	Indu Bhushan Singh	2,382	1.35	
RJP	Rajeev Kumar Choudhary	1,660	0.94	
NOTA	None of the above	1,515	0.86	
Majority		20,293	11.52	
Turnout		176,082	56.75	
