= Sai River (Uttar Pradesh) =

River in India

Coordinates: 25°39′07″N 82°48′06″E

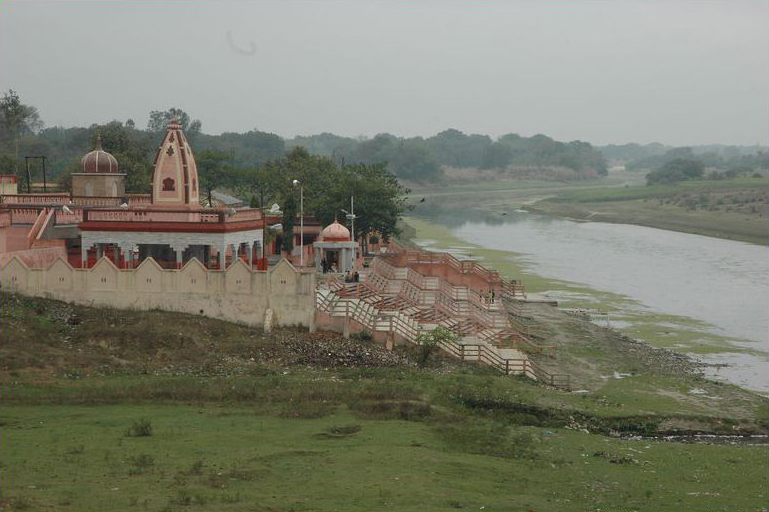
Sai River in the backdrop of Shri Belha Ji Temple

The Sai River (Sai setu), also referred to as the Aadi Ganga, is a tributary of the Gomti River in the Indian state of Uttar Pradesh.

== Geography ==
The river originates at a sprawling pond, named Bhijwan Jheel, on the hilltop at Parsoi, a village in the Hardoi district. It separates the region of Lucknow from Unnao. The river flows south by Raebareli, comes into the region of Pratapgarh then turns east and touches the Ghuisarnath Dham, from there it touches another Chandika Dham and moves Jaunpur through the west . Most of the districts of Uttar Pradesh are situated on the banks of the Sai River. Shani Dev Dham is located on banks of the Sai River at Parsadepur.

== Culture ==
Devotees take a bath in the Sai River and worship Baba Ghuisarnath with its water in India. It is one of the most sacred rivers in Hinduism. It is referenced in Puranas and in Ramcharitmanas of Goswami Tulsidas. Along with its religious importance, the river is a lifeline for the millions of Indians who live on its banks and depend on it for their daily utilities. It also flows past the Belha Devi Dhaam of Pratapgarh where the people worship the river and giving it a religious importance.
