= Bela Pratapgarh =

- city
- Location in Uttar Pradesh, India Bela Pratapgarh (India)
- Coordinates: 25°55′N 82°00′E
- Country: India
- State: Uttar Pradesh
- District: Pratapgarh

Population (2001)
  - Total: 71,835

Languages
  - Official: Hindi
- Time zone: UTC+5:30 (IST)
- Vehicle registration: UP-72
- Website: up.gov.in

Bela Pratapgarh is a town and a municipal board in Pratapgarh district in the state of Uttar Pradesh, India.

== History ==
Bela Pratapgarh was originally just called Bela, presumably after the temple of Bela Bhawani (or Belha) located by the river. The 18th-century Hindi poet Baba Bhikari Das was born here, and he also composed his Kavya-nirnaya here. In 1802, Bela was chosen as a site for a cantonment of the British auxiliary forces in what was then Oudh State. In 1858, shortly after the British annexed Oudh and in the wake of the Indian Rebellion of 1857, the new district of Pratapgarh was formed, with Bela as its capital. The town subsequently became known as "Bela Pratapgarh". It was officially constituted as a municipality on 1 December 1871.

== Demographics ==
According to the 2011 census, the Bela Pratapgarh NPP (Nagar Palika Parishad) had a total population of 76,133, with a total of 39,128 males and 37,005 females.

As of 2001 India census, Bela Pratapgarh had a population of 71,835. Males constitute 53% of the population and females 47%. Bela Pratapgarh has an average literacy rate of 73%, higher than the national average of 59.5%; with 57% of the males and 43% of females literate. 13% of the population is under 6 years of age.

=== Religion ===
Religion in Bela Pratapgarh (2011 census)
Religion	Percent
Hinduism	66.27%
Islam	31.30%
Others	2.43%

Majority in Bela Pratapgarh are followers of Hinduism, with Muslims forming the second largest majority. The town also has significant populations of Christians and Sikhs.

== Economy ==
Bela Pratapgarh is famous for its amla products.
