= Mata Mawai Dham =

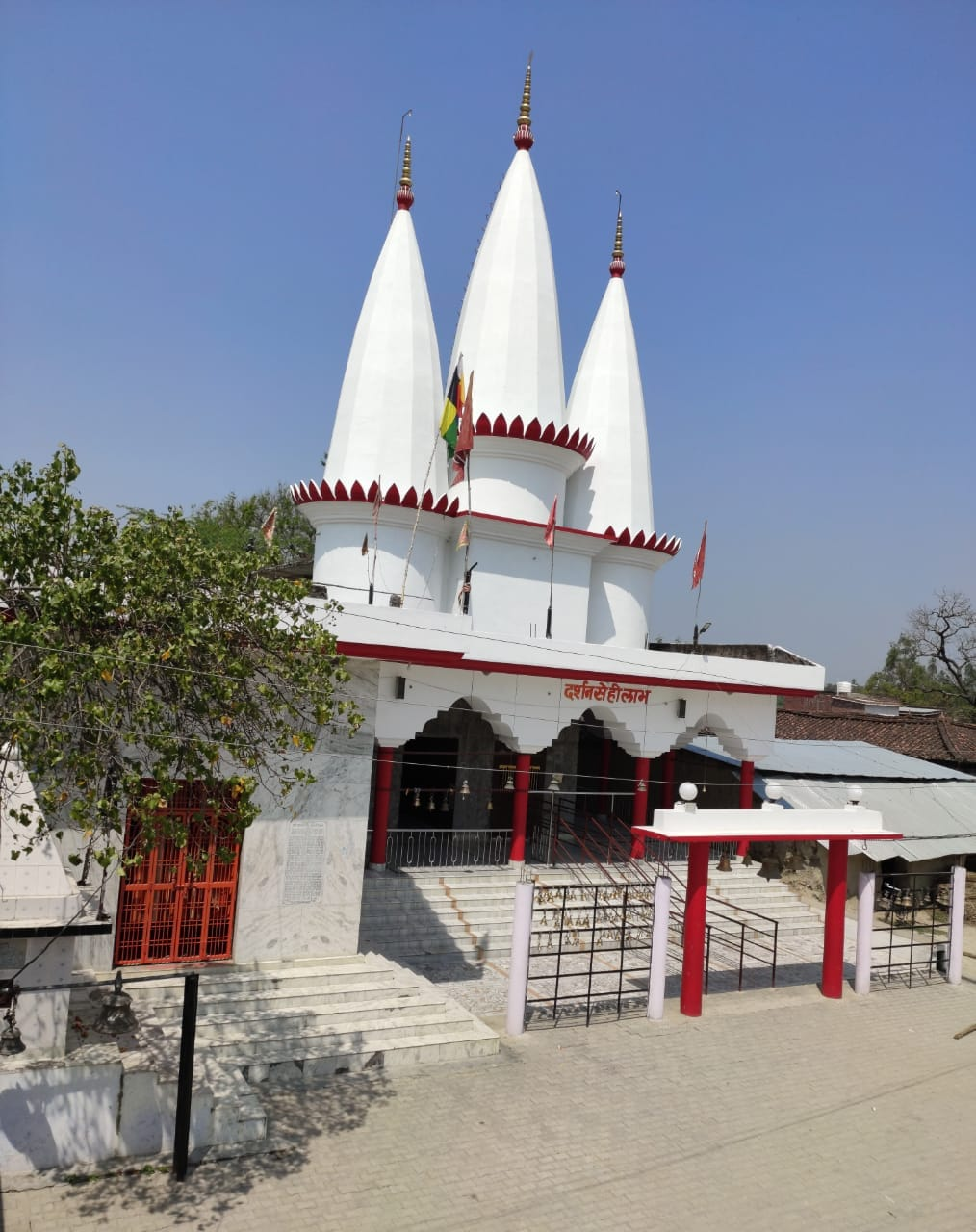
- Mata Mawai Dham

Religion
- Affiliation: Hinduism
- District: Amethi district
- Deity: Goddess Durga
- Festival: Navratri

Location
- Location: Mawai, Gauriganj
- State: Uttar Pradesh
- Country: India
- Interactive map of Mata Mawai Dham
- Coordinates: 26°12′13″N 81°43′52″E

Architecture
- Type: Hindu temple architecture

Mata Mawai Dham is a Hindu temple of Goddess Durga Ji located in Mawai Village, Raibareli - Sultanpur Road, near Amethi district headquarter Gauriganj in Uttar Pradesh, India. The temple is situated at a distance of about 125 km from the state capital Lucknow and 550 km New Delhi, 100 km from Ayodhya. This temple dedicated to Durga Mata, is the center of people's faith and spirituality. Mata Mavai Dham established four decades ago in Jethu Mawai village of the area, has become the center of faith of the devotees. Devotees come and visit this place of worship from all over the country and even the countries abroad, especially in Navratris.

== See also ==
- Nandmahar Dham
- Lodi Baba Mandir
- Durgan Dham Temple
