= List of people from Prayagraj =

List of people from Allahabad city in India

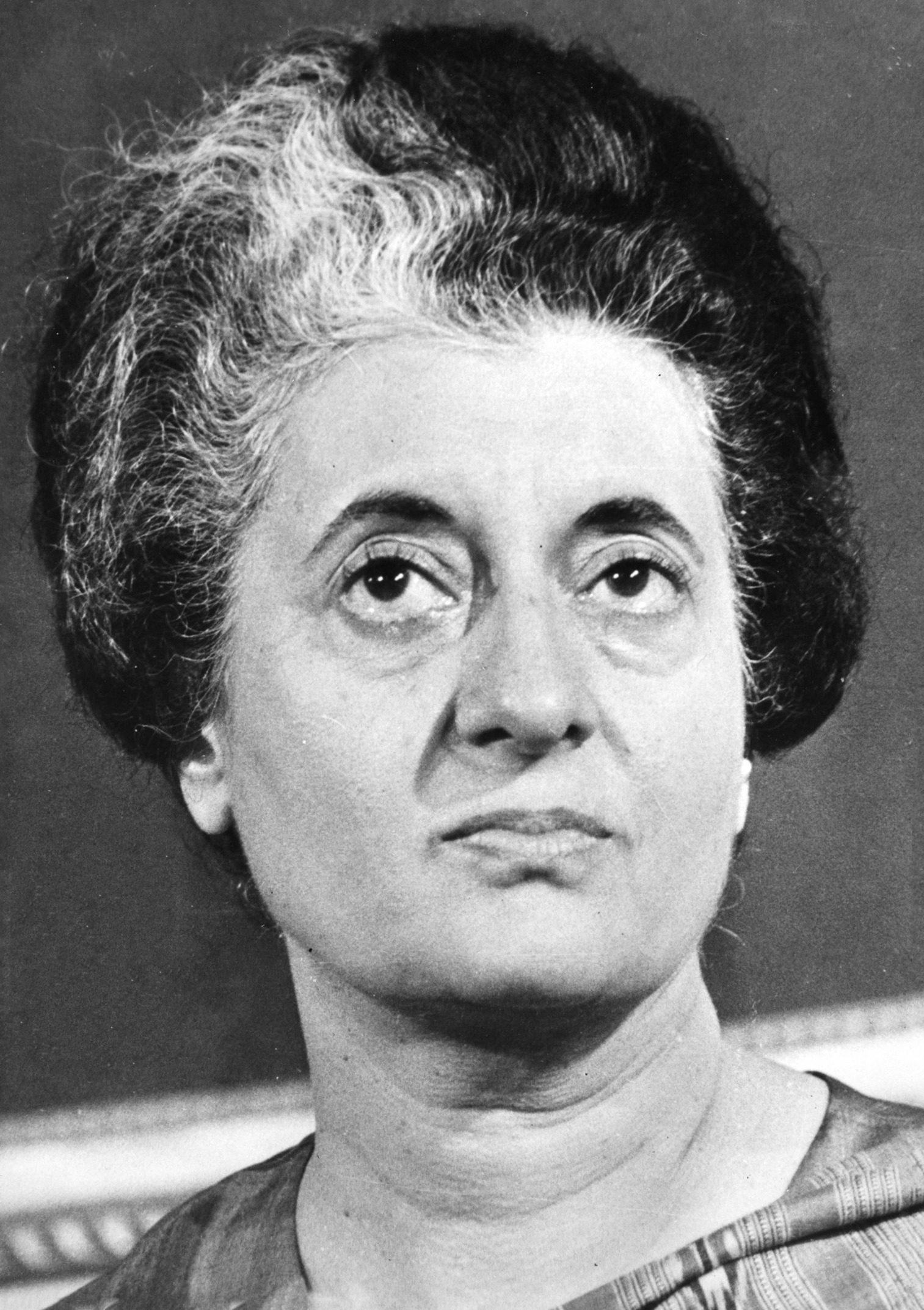
Indira Gandhi

Madan Mohan Malviya

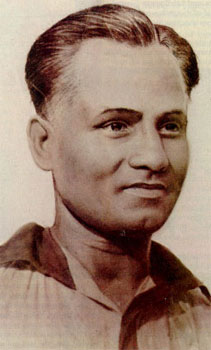
Dhyan Chand

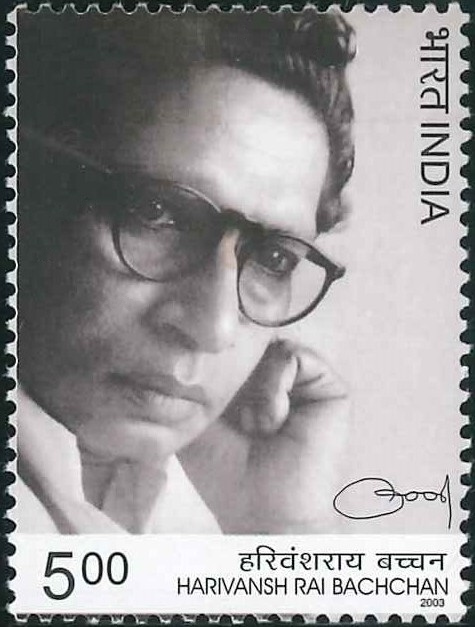
Harivansh Rai Bachchan

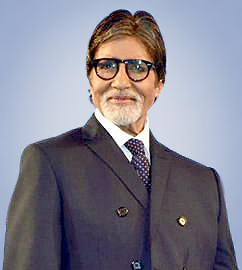
Amitabh Bachchan

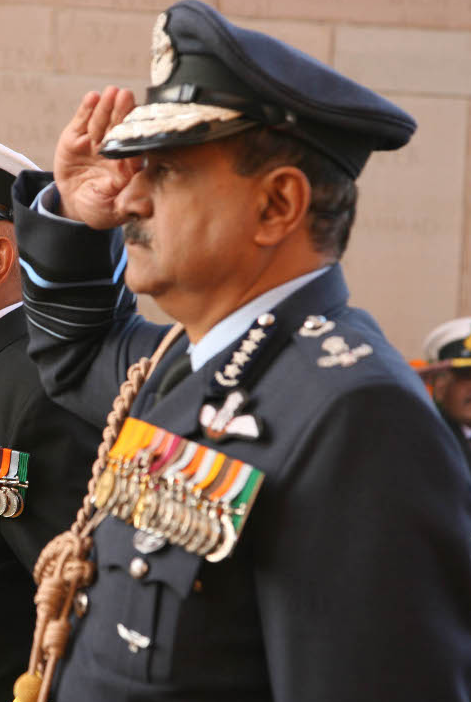
Norman Anil Kumar Browne

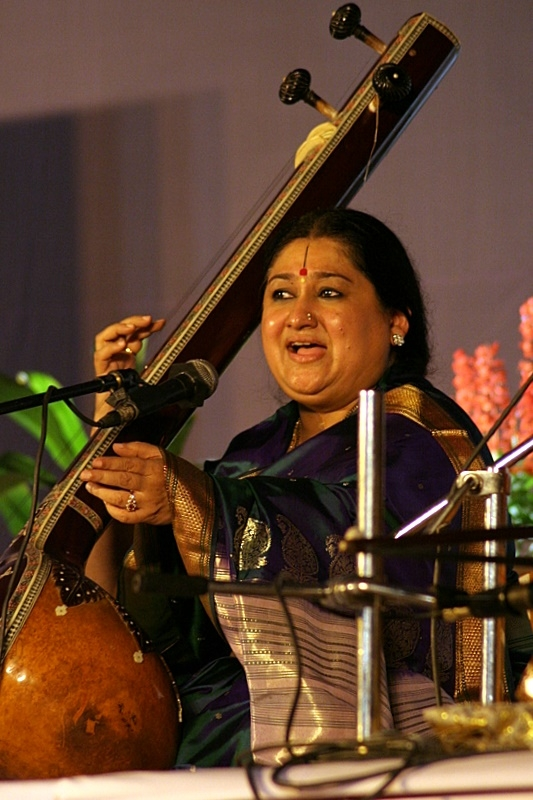
Shubha Mudgal

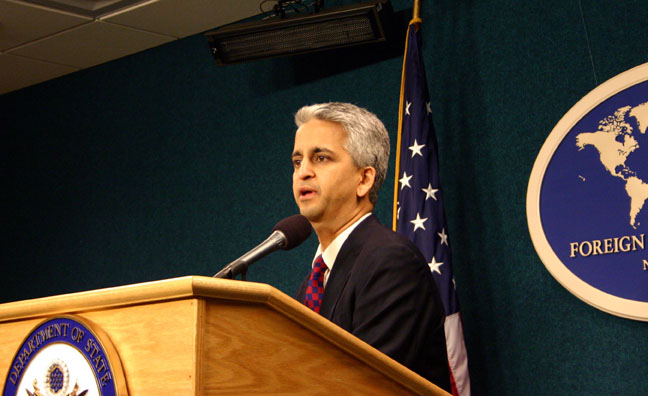
Sunil Gulati

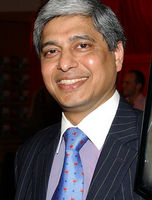
Vikas Swarup

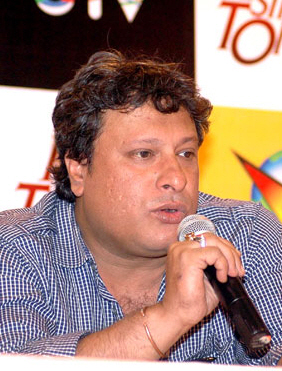
Tigmanshu Dhulia

Prayagraj-born people

The people listed below were all born in, residents of, worked in, adopted in or otherwise are closely associated with the city of Prayagraj, Uttar Pradesh and its surrounding suburbs.

People listed in bold were born in Prayagraj (Allahabad).

== Academics, science, and engineering ==
- **Manindra Agrawal** – mathematician, engineer, recipient of Padmashree, Infosys Prize and Fulkerson Prize
- Ziauddin Ahmad – mathematician
- Amiya Charan Banerjee – mathematician
- John B. Chitamber – educational reformer
- **Alakh Pandey**- educational reformer
- **Divya Dwivedi** — philosopher
- **Sorab K. Ghandhi** – educational reformer
- Rajesh Gopakumar – theoretical physicist at HRI; SSB Prize winner
- Raj Narain Kapoor – educational reformer
- Ravindra Khattree – statistician, author
- Chittaranjan Mitra – scientist
- Henri Pequet – pilot of the official airmail flight
- Zahoor Qasim – marine biologist
- Amitava Raychaudhuri – theoretical particle physicist at HRI; SSB Prize winner
- Ashoke Sen – string theorist, Fellow of the Royal Society, Milner Prize winner, theoretical physicist at HRI
- Siddharth Pandey (chemist)

== Authors and writers ==
- Suryakant Tripathi Nirala – Hindi littérateur
- Meena Alexander – poet
- Akbar Allahabadi – poet
- **Harivansh Rai Bachchan** – poet, writer, born in and resident of Allahabad
- Aniruddha Bahal – journalist, novelist
- Dharamvir Bharati – author, poet
- Krishna Prakash Bahadur – writer
- Satish Chandra – writer, historian
- Subhadra Kumari Chauhan – poet
- Shamsur Rahman Faruqi – poet
- Harisena – poet
- Rafiq Husain – writer, poet
- Arvind Krishna Mehrotra – poet, anthologist and resident of Allahabad
- Sumitranandan Pant – writer, poet
- Vibhuti Narain Rai – novelist
- Ibn-e-Safi – novelist
- Allan Sealy – author, writer, recipient of Commonwealth Writers' Prize
- Julia Strachey – novelist, writer
- Vikas Swarup – novelist, diplomat
- Mahadevi Varma – poet
- Dhirendra Verma – critic
- Amarkant – writer
- Leema Dhar -Novelist/Poet/ Motivational Speaker

== Business and philanthropy ==
- Abhay Bhushan – Computer engineer
- Amol Bose – "Grandfather of Indian advertising"
- Sarala Devi Chaudhurani – founder of Bharat Stree Mahamandal
- Jagmal Raja Chauhan – contractor, industrialist and philanthropist
- Imtiaz Alam Hanfi – banker, governor of the State Bank of Pakistan
- Sam Higginbottom – philanthropist, founder of Sam Higginbottom Institute of Agriculture, Technology and Sciences
- Neeraj Roy – managing director and CEO Hungama
- Mason Vaugh – philanthropist, educational reformer

== Fine arts ==
- Mallika Chabba – painter
- Hariprasad Chaurasia – musician
- Ram Chandra Shukla – painter
- Shubha Mudgal – musician

== Media ==
- **Amitabh Bachchan** – film actor, recipient of Padma Vibhushan, Knight of the Legion of Honour and resident of Allahabad
- Vijay Bose – theatre director and actor
- Sulochana Brahaspati – singer
- Hariprasad Chaurasia – composer, flutist
- Rakesh Chaurasia – flautist
- **Tigmanshu Dhulia** – director, producer, recipient of National Film Award
- Tanveer Zaidi – film actor, educationist, television presenter
- Aditya Srivastava – actor
- Deepraj Rana - actor
- Vikrant Chaturvedi – voice artist
- Nikhil Dwivedi – actor
- Jaddanbai – singer, actress
- Nidhi Singh - Actress
- Nalin Mazumdar – guitarist
- Prachi Mishra – former Femina Miss India Earth
- Indrani Mukherjee – actress
- Nargis – actress
- Kinsey Peile – playwright, actor
- Abhishek Nigam – actor
- Siddharth Nigam – actor
- Roshni Walia – actor
- Mudit Nayar – actor
- Pawan Shankar – actor, entrepreneur
- Faisal Malik- actor

== Military ==
- **Norman Anil Kumar Browne** – former Chief of Air Staff of the Indian Air Force; India's ambassador to Norway; born in Allahabad
- George Nicolas Channer – recipient of the Victoria Cross
- Syed Ata Hasnain – Lieutenant General in the Indian Army
- Bhopinder Singh – Lieutenant Governor of the Andaman and Nicobar Islands

== Music ==
- Bholanath Prasanna - classical flautist
- **Hariprasad Chaurasia** – classical flautist
- Sahana Devi – singer, resident of Allahabad
- **Shubha Mudgal** – classical

== Nobel laureates ==
- Rudyard Kipling – author, assistant editor at The Pioneer (Allahabad), Nobel Prize in Literature (1907)

== Politics and law ==
=== Head of state and government ===
- **Indira Gandhi** - 3rd Prime Minister of India; born in and resident of Allahabad
- **Jawaharlal Nehru** - 1st Prime Minister of India
- Chandra Shekhar - 8th Prime Minister of India
- Vishwanath Pratap Singh - 7th Prime Minister of India
- **Keshari Nath Tripathi** - Governor of West Bengal, Governor of Bihar, Governor of Mizoram and lawyer at Allahabad High Court

=== Others ===
- Asaf Ali – Governor of Odisha
- Hemvati Nandan Bahuguna -Former Chief Minister of Uttar Pradesh, Minister of Finance
- Hari Krishna Shastri, Former MP Allahabad
- Amitabh Bachan, Former MP Allahabad
- Rita Bahuguna – Member of Parliament Allahabad
- Vijay Bahuguna – Chief Minister of Uttarakhand
- Rajendra Kumari Bajpai – Lieutenant Governor of Pondicherry, Union Minister of India
- Shanti Bhushan – 5th Law Minister of India
- B. K. Chaturvedi – cabinet secretary of India, recipient of Padma Bhushan
- Alvin Robert Cornelius – 4th Chief Justice of Pakistan
- Justice S. N. Dwivedi
- John Edge – Chief Justice of High Court of Judicature of the North-Western Provinces
- Mohammed Fazal – Governor of Maharashtra
- Feroze Gandhi – politician, journalist
- Terence Gavaghan – colonial administrator
- A. N. D. Haksar – diplomat
- Muzaffar Hasan - Former Minister of Transportation, Uttar Pradesh
- Saligram Jaiswal – freedom fighter; former Health Minister, U.P.
- Murli Manohar Joshi – 1st Minister of Human Resource Development, former Ministry of Science and Technology of India
- V. N. Khare – 33rd Chief Justice of India
- **Madan Mohan Malaviya** – Bharat Ratna, 25th, 34th and 50th President of the Indian National Congress
- Masuriya Din Pasi, Former Member Of Indian Parliament
- Janeshwar Mishra – politician
- Mukhtar Abbas Naqvi – politician
- Kamala Nehru – freedom fighter, First Lady of the Indian National Congress
- **Motilal Nehru** – 36th and 47th President of the Indian National Congress
- Bishambhar Nath Pande – former mayor of Allahabad
- Vijaya Lakshmi Pandit – politician, recipient of Bharat Ratna
- Gopal Swarup Pathak – 4th Vice President of India, 4th Governor of Karnataka
- Ferdino Rebello – 42nd Chief Justice of Allahabad High Court
- Girish Chandra Saxena – former Governor of Jammu and Kashmir
- Krishna Mohan Seth – former Governor of Chhattisgarh, Madhya Pradesh and Tripura
- Anshuman Singh – former Governor of Rajasthan and Gujarat, former Chief Justice of Rajasthan High Court
- Cornelia Sorabji – first woman advocate of India when admitted to Allahabad High Court
- Purushottam Das Tandon – lawyer, freedom fighter
- Kailas Nath Wanchoo – 10th Chief Justice of India
- Baba Ram Adhar Yadav – freedom fighter, ex-MLA, social activist
- Tanaya Narendra – sexual health educator, doctor, embryologist, and scientist.
- Sidharth Nath Singh, Former Cabinet Minister in First Yogi Adityanath ministry.
- Satish Chandra (Judge), Chief Justice of Calcutta High Court, acting Governor of West Bengal

== Religion ==
- Ismail Qureshi al Hashmi – religious scholar
- Muhibullah Allahabadi -Sufi scholar
- Samuel H. Kellogg – Presbyterian missionary who played a major role in revising and retranslating the Hindi Bible; teacher at Allahabad Bible Seminary
- Kripalu Maharaj – spiritual leader
- **Ramananda** – reviver of the Ramanandi sect
- John Banerjee – Assistant bishop of Lahore for the Church of England

== Royal and noble ranks ==
- Khusrau Mirza – Prince of the Mughal Empire
- Mirza Nali – Prince of the Mughal Empire

== Sports ==
- Ali Murtaza – first-class cricketer
- Yash Dayal - Indian Cricketer
- Hyder Ali – first-class professional bowler
- **Dhyan Chand** – Olympic gold medalist
- Nikhil Chopra – first-class professional bowler
- Suresh Goel – badminton champion
- **Sunil Gulati** - president of the United States Soccer Federation; born in Allahabad
- Abhinn Shyam Gupta – Olympic badminton player
- **Mohammad Kaif** – first-class batsman in Indian Cricket Team
- Ashish Kumar – holder of silver and bronze Commonwealth Games medals
- Vivek Mishra – gymnast of Asian and Commonwealth games
- Danish Mujtaba – Olympic player
- Shalabh Srivastava – first-class professional bowler
- Jyoti Yadav – first-class batsman in UP Cricket Team
- Ashish Zaidi – first-class professional bowler
- Obaid Kamal – first-class Medium Fast professional bowler Represented India A and India Youth XI
- Rohit Prakash Srivastava
- Shalabh Srivastava

== See also ==
- List of University of Allahabad alumni
- Prayagraj
