= List of people from Purvanchal =

This is a list of people from Purvanchal region of Uttar Pradesh also few parts of Bihar state of India.

== Academics, science, and engineering ==
- Sushruta, father of plastic surgery
- Bishun Khare, Research Scientist
- Arvind Mohan Kayastha, Biologist
- Vagish Shastri, Sanskrit grammarian and yogi.
- Ziauddin Ahmad, mathematician
- Jhillu Singh Yadav, chemist
- Rajesh Gopakumar, theoretical physicist at HRI; SSB Prize winner
- Ganganath Jha, scholar, philosopher
- Raj Narain Kapoor, educational reformer
- Chittaranjan Mitra, scientist
- Prem Chand Pandey
- Zahoor Qasim, marine biologist
- Amitava Raychaudhuri, theoretical particle physicist at HRI; SSB Prize winner
- Ashoke Sen, string theorist; Fellow of the Royal Society; Milner Prize winner; theoretical physicist at HRI
- Obaid Siddiqui

== Civil Servants ==
Jagmohan Yadav addressing a press conference

- Jagmohan Yadav, Former chief of Uttar Pradesh Police
- Chandrika Prasad Srivastava
- Anil Sinha, Bihar Ex-CBI Director
- Vinod Kumar Yadav, Former Chairman and CEO of Railway Board
- Vinod Rai, former CAG.
- Vikas Swarup, former diplomat and Secretary of Foreign Affairs.

== Armed forces ==
- Mahendra Nath Mulla
- Abdul Hamid
- Bhopinder Singh, Lieutenant Governor of the Andaman and Nicobar Islands

== Artists ==
- Bismillah Khan
- Birju Maharaj
- Ravi Shankar
- Ram Chandra Shukla, painter
- Ram Kinkar Upadhyay

== Entertainment and media ==
=== Actor ===
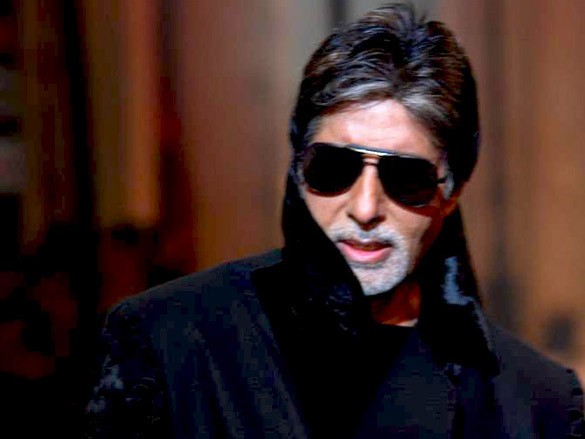
Amitabh Bachchan

- Amitabh Bachchan
- Anjaan
- Baba Azmi
- Manoj Bajpai, actor
- Pankaj Tripathi, actor
- Parichay Das
- Vijay Bose, theatre director and actor
- Sudhir Dar, cartoonist
- Dinesh Lal Yadav, actor and politician
- Manoj Tiwari, actor and politician
- Vidisha Srivastava, actress
- Shanvi Srivastava, actress
- Amrapali Dubey, actress
- Girija Devi
- Kaifi Azmi
- Siddheshwari Devi
- Rajkumari Dubey
- Anshuman Jha, actor
- Anurag Kashyap, film director
- Ravi Kishan, Bollywood actor and Politician
- Chhannulal Mishra
- Rajan and Sajan Mishra
- Gopal Shankar Misra
- Lalmani Misra
- Indrani Mukherjee, actress
- Hemanta Kumar Mukhopadhyay
- Chunky Pandey
- Sudhanshu Pandey
- Kinsey Peile, playwright, actor
- Rahi Masoom Raza
- Jhanak Shukla
- Saurabh Shukla
- Supriya Shukla
- Vinay Shukla
- Kapila Vatsyayan

=== Singer ===
- Sulochana Brahaspati, singer
- Dinesh Lal Yadav, actor, singer, and politician
- Manoj Tiwari, actor, singer, and politician
- Sameer

=== Musician ===
- Nalin Mazumdar, guitarist
- Kishan Maharaj

== Entrepreneurs, Businessman and Tech office holders ==
- Ravindra Kishore Sinha, Founder of Security Intelligence Service Pvt. Ltd.
- Subrata Roy, Founder Sahara India
- Rashmi Sinha is an Indian businesswoman and CEO of San Francisco-based technology company SlideShare.
- Sandeep Pandey

== Freedom fighters and kings ==
- Jay Prakash Narayan
- Mangal Pandey
- Chittu Pandey
- Veer Abdul Hamid
- Vibhuti Narayan Singh Maharaja Banaras Kashinaresh
- Rewati Raman Singh

== Politicians ==
=== President of India ===
- Rajendra Prasad, First President of India

=== Vice President of India ===
- Mohammad Hamid Ansari, Former Vice President of India.

=== Prime Minister of India ===
- Jawaharlal Nehru, First Prime minister of India.
- Lal Bahadur Shastri, Ex-Prime minister of India.
- Indira Gandhi, Former Prime minister of India.
- Chandra Shekhar, Former Prime Minister of India
- V. P. Singh, Former Prime Minister of India

=== Deputy Prime Ministers of India ===
- Jagjivan Ram, First Labour Minister of India, first Dalit Deputy PM of India and founder of All India Depressed Classes League & Congress (Jagjivan).

=== Chief Minister of Uttar Pradesh ===
- Sampurnanand Ex-Chief Minister of Uttar Pradesh
- Tribhuvan Narain Singh, Former Chief Minister of Uttar Pradesh.
- Kamalapati Tripathi, Former Chief Minister of Uttar Pradesh.
- Vir Bahadur Singh, Former Chief minister of Uttar Pradesh.
- Rajnath Singh, Defense Minister of India and Ex-Chief Minister of Uttar Pradesh.
- Yogi Adityanath, Chief Minister of Uttar Pradesh.

=== Chief Ministers of Bihar (India) ===
- Harihar Singh (1969-1969)
- Lalu Prasad Yadav (1990-1995)
- Rabri Devi (1997-2005)
- Daroga Prasad Rai (1970, for 10 months)
- Kedar Pandey (1972-1973)
- Abdul Ghafoor (1973-1975)
- Ram Sundar Das (1979-1980)
- Bindeshwari Dubey (1985-1988)

=== Governors of States ===
- Girish Chandra Saxena, Former Governor of Jammu and Kashmir
- Manoj Sinha, Governor of Jammu and Kashmir
- Lakshman Prasad Acharya, Governor of Assam
- Devendra Nath Dwivedi, former Governor of Gujarat
- Sri Prakasa, former Governor of Assam
- Sampurnanand, former Governor of Rajasthan

=== Deputy Chief Ministers ===
Deputy CM Uttar Pradesh

- Keshav Prasad Maurya, Deputy Chief Minister of Uttar Pradesh

Deputy CM Bihar

- Tejashwi Yadav, Bihar (2015-2017)
- Ram Jaipal Singh Yadav, Bihar (1971-1972)
- Renu Devi, Bihar (2020-2022)

=== Other ===
- Raj Narain, Ex-MP
- Ravindra Kishore Sinha Bihar Ex-MP Rajya Sabha, Billionaire
- Anil Shastri, Ex-MP Varanasi
- Sunil Shastri, Ex-MLA Gorakhpur
- Manglesh Kumar Srivastava, Mayor of Gorakhpur
- Jagdambika Pal MP
- Sidharth Nath Singh, MLA Allahabad West, Ex-Cabinet Minister of UP
- Anupriya Patel Central Cabinet Minister
- Giriraj Singh Bihar Central Cabinet Minister
- Rashmi Varma Bihar
- Surya Pratap Shahi
- Swatantra Dev Singh
- Nand Gopal Gupta
- Anil Rajbhar
- Ravindra Jaiswal
- Mangal Pandey, Cabinet Minister of Bihar
- Om Prakash Rajbhar
- Pramod Tiwari MP Rajya Sabha
- Mohd Zama Khan, Cabinet Minister of Bihar

== Chief Justice and Judges ==
- V. N. Khare, former Chief Justice of India

== National and International Award winners ==
=== Bharat Ratna ===
- Bismillah Khan
- Jayaprakash Narayan
- Rajendra Prasad

=== Magasaysay Award ===
- Jayaprakash Narayan
- Ravish Kumar

== Social activists ==
- Veer Bhadra Mishra, academic, environmentalist
- Billy Arjan Singh, conservationist

== Spiritual leaders ==
- Bhagwan Das

== Sportspeople ==
=== Badminton ===
- Suresh Goel

=== Baseball ===
- Rinku Singh

=== Cricket ===
- Narendra Hirwani
- Umesh Yadav
- Suresh Raina
- Mohammad Kaif
- Rudra Pratap Singh
- Piyush Chawla

=== Gymnastics ===
- Ashish Kumar, holder of silver and bronze Commonwealth Games medals
- Vivek Mishra, gymnast of Asian and Commonwealth games

=== Hockey ===
- Dhyan Chand
- Mohammed Shahid

== Writers ==
- Premchand.
- Ramlochan Vishwakarma, Indian folk writer
- Meena Alexander, poet
- Krishna Prakash Bahadur, writer
- Aniruddha Bahal, journalist, novelist
- Guru Bhakt Singh 'Bhakt'
- Dharamvir Bharati, author, poet
- Subhadra Kumari Chauhan, poet
- Satish Chandra, writer, historian
- Sudama Panday 'Dhoomil'
- Kapil Deva Dvivedi
- Shamsur Rahman Faruqi, poet
- Harisena, poet
- Bharatendu Harishchandra
- Sri Krishna Rai Hridyesh
- Rafiq Husain, writer, poet
- Ibn-e-Safi, novelist
- Laxmi Narayan Mishra
- Vidya Niwas Mishra
- Shibli Nomani
- Jaishankar Prasad
- Munshi Premchand
- Acharya Kuber Nath Rai
- Vibhuti Narain Rai, novelist
- Viveki Rai
- Rahul Sankrityayan
- Parichay Das
- Allan Sealy, author, writer
- Ramchandra Shukla
- Kedarnath Singh
- Julia Strachey, novelist, writer
- Sri Lal Sukla
- Baldev Upadhyaya
- Sachchidananda Vatsyayan
- Amish Tripathi

== Scholar ==
- Sachchidananda Sinha, lawyer and parliamentarian
- Ananda Prasad, biochemist
- Gupteshwar Pandey, former DGP of Bihar
- Kapil Muni Tiwary, linguist
