= Syed Muhammad Ashraf =

Indian poet

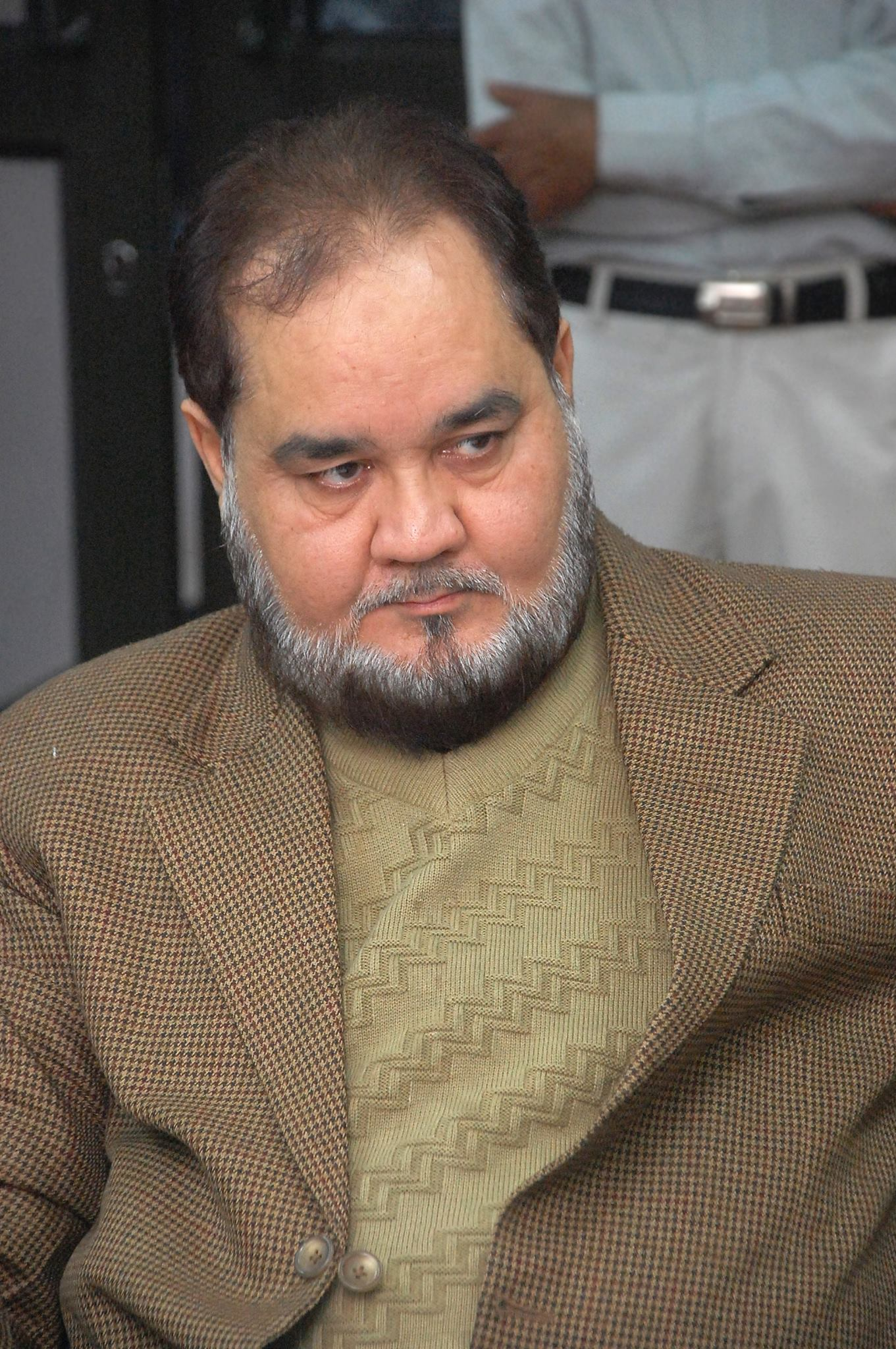
- Born: Muhammad Ashraf; Marehra, Etah Uttar Pradesh, India
- Occupations: Income Tax Commissioner and Poet
- Writing career
- Years active: Present
- Genres: Urdu novelist and short-story writer

Syed Muhammad Ashraf also known as S. M. Ashraf is an Indian Retired Civil Servant (IRS) and an Urdu novelist and short-story writer. He is first person to qualify civil service examination in Urdu language in India. He has written novels and several collections of short stories. Some of his stories have been translated into English and other languages. He has received the Sahitya Academy Award in 2004 and Aalmi Farogh-e-Urdu Adab Award by Majlis-e-Farogh-e-Urdu Qatar in 2018.

== Life ==
He was born on 8 July 1957 at Sitapur, a town in Awadh region in Uttar Pradesh, he belongs to a family of devoted scholars and Sufi saints of Marehra Shareef in Etah district of Uttar Pradesh, India. His father and ancestors headed the Khanquah-e-Barkaatiya that has catered down the ages for the spiritual alleviation of irrespective of their caste, color or creed.

His elder brother, Syed Muhammad Ameen Mian Quadri, serves as the custodian of the Dargah of Marehra Sharif. Ashraf grew up in a family associated with Sufi traditions, which influenced his early outlook. He also had access to the library of Khanqah-e-Barkaatiya, which contains works in Urdu, Persian, Arabic, and Sanskrit.

== Education ==
Ashraf's literary predilection was developed and refined further, as he joined the Aligarh Muslim University for doing Bachelor of Arts in Urdu literature. That he took part in the co-curricular activities, particularly literary ones, as evident from the several posts he held at the AMU, ranging from Secretary, University Literary Club, Secretary AMU Great Books Club to Editor, Aftab Magazine. Also, he was the winner of various debating trophies. Ashraf's preoccupation with literary activities and writing stories gained wide acclaim on the University campus, he kept earning the highest academic distinctions by standing first in his BA (Hons.) and MA examinations and was awarded Gold Medals for his academic excellence. After obtaining his master's degree he appeared at the highly competitive Civil Service Examinations and set a new record in the history of UPSC as he took Urdu as the medium of examination and qualified Civil Service.

== Career ==
In 1981, he joined Indian Revenue Service and in 1990, he was appointed as Joint Commissioner Income Tax, Kanpur 1992 and also established Sir Syed Public Schools in Kanpur and rose to be the first Income Tax Commissioner at Aligarh in 2007, after having served at important positions in the Income 'tax Department at Nagpur, Agra, Kanpur and Mumbai, presently he is posted as Commissioner of Income Tax in New Delhi.

Apart from discharging his professional duty, Ashraf holds the cause of education very dear to his heart. He has been instrumental in establishing educational institutions for the underprivileged in Kanpur, Marehra and Unnao and founding the educational complex, Al-Barkaat Educational Institution at Aligarh that imparts the education of CBSE 10 +2/MBA/BE.d and other professions courses. He has delivered lectures on social, educational and cultural issues at the leading 'Indian universities and also at the Urdu Festival under the aegis of University of Virginia, USA.

== Awards and Posts ==
In 2008, he was awarded membership of Bhasha Samiti for Saraswati Samman while in 2008 he was appointed as member, National Council for Promotion of Urdu Language (NCPUL). In recognition of his services in promoting of Urdu literature, Ashraf has been honored with the highest literary awards in India including Sahitya Academy Award (2003), UP Urdu Academy Collective Services Award (2013), Madhya Pradesh Govt.’s ‘Iqbal Samman Award’ (2017) and ‘Katha award’ (1995). He is founder Vice President of Al-Barkat Educational Institutions and Jamia Al-Barkaat and Al-Barkaat Public School.

== Works ==
Ashraf has shown his creativity in all his fiction stories, novels, poetry and non-fiction prose. Among his fiction books include ‘Dar se Bichrhe’ (1994), ‘Baad-e-Saba ka Intezar’ (2000), in novels ‘Mera man; Ek qissa suno’, ‘Number war ka Neela'(1997 ), ‘Murdar Khor’ and ‘Aakhri Sawariyan’ got fame. Many of his novels have been translated into English, Hindi and other Indian languages. He has also written the biography of his father, titled ‘Yaad-e-Hassan’ and published a collection of his naatia poetry titled ‘Sallo alehe waleh’. Many students at Jammu University, Aligarh Muslim University and Delhi University are doing M. Phil. on his novels ‘Dar se Bichrhe’ and ‘Number dar ka Neela’.

His award-winning novel ‘The Silence of the Hyena’ is an inextricable part of some people's daily lives. The real-life instances curated into the narrative of some stories flow smoothly. Using animals as metaphors, the award-winning writer Syed Muhammad Ashraf, who qualified the Indian Administrative Service in his mother tongue, Urdu, has tried to get into the recesses of the human heart. His works include:

- Daar Se Bichde
- Baad-e-Saba Ka Intizar
- Aadmi
- General knowledge se bahar ka Sawaal
- Aakhri Ban-baas
- Lakadbaggha Roya
- Qurbani Ka Janwar
- Andhaa Oont
- Lakadbaggha Chup Ho Gaya
- Qadeem Maabadon ka Muhafiz
- Aakhri Mod Par
- Lakadbaggha Hansa
- Toofan

== See also ==
- Wasim Barelvi
