= William H. Wiser =

American anthropologist

William Henricks Wiser (28 January 1890 – 21 February 1961), also spelled as Hendricks, was an American anthropologist, and a Fourth Presbyterian Church, Chicago IL Presbyterian rural-missionary sent to North India - Uttar Pradesh.

He authored several books, notably, Behind Mud Walls, The Hindu Jajmani System, and many more.

== Early life ==
He was born in Pottstown, Pennsylvania in 1890, and graduated from the University of Chicago. In 1933, while on furlough, he did his PhD in rural social organisation at Cornell University. He was married to Charlotte Melina Viall in December, 1916, at Allahabad, India. They had three sons.

He was sent as a rural-missionary by Board of Foreign Missions of the Presbyterian Church, US, in 1915.

== Missionary work ==
He began missionary work by initially teaching at Allahabad Agricultural Institute, later joined by his wife Charlotte Viall, who arrived in India in 1916. He then served as a professor of rural sociology at the North India Theological College, Sahranpur, between 1933 and 1941, after he finished his doctorate from Cornell University. During their first term, his wife did teaching, social work, and worked at industrial cooperatives in Kanpur and Allahabad. He also directed the students in practical work in nearby villages.

Between 1925 and 1930, they lived in the village as members of the North India mission of the Presbyterian Church of the United States of America. Thereafter they maintained close connections with the villagers from their mission headquarters in a nearby town. Their first account of life in Karimpur was published in 1930 as Behind Mud Walls. He later became a resident scholar at Cornell University where, with the assistance of the rural sociology department, he prepared The Hindu Jajmani System: A Socio-Economic System Interrelating Members of a Hindu Village Community in Services in 1936.

In 1925, after six years of teaching at the Allahabad Agriculture College in India, they surveyed the farming community to better understand the agriculture conditions and life situations facing his students. The survey turned into a detailed study of Indian village life, that ultimately extended till 1930 leading to several books to be published, including his doctoral dissertation Social Institutions of a Hindu Village in North India, that he submitted to Cornell University in 1933.

During their second term, they worked at Mainpuri, Uttar Pradesh. They lived in a village Karimganj, which falls under Mainpuri district, to get to know the village people and village life. Most of his works reflects life in Karimpur between 1925 and 1930. Both he and his wife began serving rural societies, conducting surveys, and performing extensive studies of social, economical, and religious life of rural peasants. Their intensive research and experience led to pioneering work in Indian anthropology and publishing of books, namely, Behind Mud Walls in collaboration with Charlotte Wiser, The Hindu Jajmani System, and Social institutions of a Hindu village in North India, and more. These books have become a standard text that is still taught in colleges and universities throughout United States, particularly in Iowa state.

From 1945 to 1960, both Wisers were instrumental in the development of India Village Service, a demonstration project for the improvement of village life. It later became India's Block Development Program at Marehra, Etah district, Uttar Pradesh.

He also collected Indian folklore stories and songs. These stories and songs were translated from Hindi to English. He was a co-opted member of the Tambaram meeting of the International Missionary Council in 1938, and his research is quoted extensively in The Economic Basis of the Church. He died in 1961 in Uniontown, Pennsylvania, having retired in 1959.

== Works ==
- Social Institutions of a Hindu Village in North India, in 1933.
- For All of Life, in 1943.
- Behind Mud Walls, in 1930–1960, 1970–1980.
- The Hindu Jajmani System, in 1936.
- A study of 31 Urban Churches in the United Provinces, in 1939.
- Discussion and Program Suggestions for Young People, in 1942.

== See also ==
- Jajmani system
- Kaisar-i-Hind
