= Operation Progress =

Operation Progress may refer to:

- Operation Progress, a 1941 Russian Donbas–Rostov strategic defensive operation during World War II
- Operation Progress, a 1957 policy of Terence Gavaghan in British Kenya
- Operation Progress, a 1968 KGB operation against Czechoslovak reformers during the Prague Spring
