= Charlotte Viall Wiser =

American anthropologist

- Born: 1892; Chicago, Illinois
- Died: 1981 (aged 88–89)
- Occupations: anthropologist, author and Presbyterian missionary
- Spouse: William H. Wiser
- Awards: Kaisar-i-Hind Medal

Academic background
- Education: University of Chicago
- Alma mater: Cornell University, New York

Charlotte Viall Wiser (née Charlotte Melina Viall; 1892–1981) was an American anthropologist and Presbyterian missionary to Uttar Pradesh in North India. She authored several books, notably, Behind Mud Walls and The Foods of a Hindu Village of North India. She received the Kaiser-i-Hind Medal, an award given for public service in India.

== Early life ==
Charlotte Melina Viall was born in Chicago, Illinois, and was educated at the University of Chicago. She was sent as a Presbyterian missionary to India in 1916. She married William H. Wiser, another Presbyterian missionary in India, at Allahabad in 1916. They had three sons – Arthur, Alfred, and Edward.

== Missionary work ==
Her first term of missionary work was spent doing social work in Kanpur and teaching courses at the Allahabad Agricultural Institute. During their second missionary term (1925–1930), they worked in Mainpuri, and lived in village Karimpur, near Agra, to get to know the village people and village life.

She and her husband spent most of their time researching in North India villages. Initially, they did survey of a farming community to better understand the agriculture conditions. Later, they conducted extensive studies on the social, economic, and religious life of peasants between 1925 and 1930. Based on their survey, research, and experience in Indian Anthropology, Wister published several books, such as Behind Mud Walls, in collaboration with her husband William Wiser. Their research books have become influential sources about North Indian village life, and were used to teach in colleges and universities across the United States, especially in Iowa. While in furlough, Wister completed her Master of Science degree in Nutrition from Cornell University, submitting the work The Foods of a Hindu Village of North India as her thesis.

Wister worked among Indian women and children from rural areas to help raise the standard of health. She ran baby shows like fairs demonstrating Western hygiene and childcare techniques. From 1945 to 1960, both Charlotte and her husband played pivotal and responsible role in the development and direction of Indian Village Service, a demonstration project for the improvement of village life. It later became a model for agencies involving in rural community development program—India's Block Development Program at Marehra, Etah district.

She returned to the United States in 1970 and died in December 1981, aged 89.

== Works ==
- For All of Life a Presbyterian Mission study book, in 1943.
- Four families of Karimpur, in 1978.
- Behind Mud Walls, in 1930–1960, 1970–1980.
- The Foods of a Hindu Village of North India, in 1936.
