= Pem Prakash =

Poems collection by Barkatullah Marharvi

Pem Prakash is a book written by Syed Shah Barkatullah Marharvi, who used Pemi in Hindi poems and Ishqi in Persian was a Sufi saint of Qadiriyya order from Marehra. In this book, he has written poems and emphasized on the oneness of God. It was written during the reign of Aurangzeb.

Mahamahopadhyaya Pandit Lachhmi Dhar, head of Department of Sanskrit in the St. Stephens College under the University of Delhi, and Frank Brothers Publication had published the book.
