= Seth Achal Singh =

Indian independence activist and politician

- Born: 5 May 1895; Agra, North-Western Provinces, British India
- Died: 22 December 1983 (aged 88); Agra, Uttar Pradesh, India
- Citizenship: Indian
- Education: Allahabad Agricultural Institute
- Occupation: Politician
- Years active: 1918–1977
- Political party: INC, (Indian National Congress).
- Children: 1 son (adopted).
- Parent: Seth Pitam Mal (father).

Seth Achal Singh (5 May 1895 – 22 December 1983) was a prominent Indian independence activist and member of the 1st, 2nd, 3rd, 4th, and 5th Lok Sabha of India. He represented the Agra Lok Sabha constituency of Uttar Pradesh as a politician of the Indian National Congress.

== Education & background ==
Achal Singh was educated at Agra Collegiate School, Cantonment Board College and then at Allahabad Agricultural Institute.

== See also ==
- List of members of the 15th Lok Sabha of India
