= Pramod Wasudeo Ramteke =

Indian microbiologist

- Born: May 30, 1957 (age 69); Yavatmal, India
- Education: Nagpur University
- Scientific career
- Fields: Microbiology
- Workplaces: Sam Higginbottom University of Agriculture, Technology and Sciences; Indian Institute of Toxicology Research

Pramod Wasudeo Ramteke (born 1957) is an Indian microbiologist and has contributed significantly in Plant Growth Promoting Rhizobacteria research.

== Awards and honors ==
He is an elected fellow of many learned societies and professional associations such as The Linnean Society of London, National Academy of Agricultural Sciences, Biotech Research Society of India, Royal Society of Biology, Academy of Microbiological Sciences (AMI), National Academy of Biological Sciences, Mycological Society of India and International Society of Environmental Botanists.

He is the recipient of Banaras Hindu University Centennial Award, Prof. G. S. Rangaswamy Award, Excellence in Science Award (SCON), J. C. Bose Gold Medal, Dr. J. C. Edward Medal, Prof. K. S. Bilgramy Memorial Award, Prof. K. V. Shastri Gold Medal and V. S. Chauhan Gold Medal.
