= Ameen Mian Quadri =

Religious leader

Prof. Syed Muhammad Ameen Mian Qadri Barkati
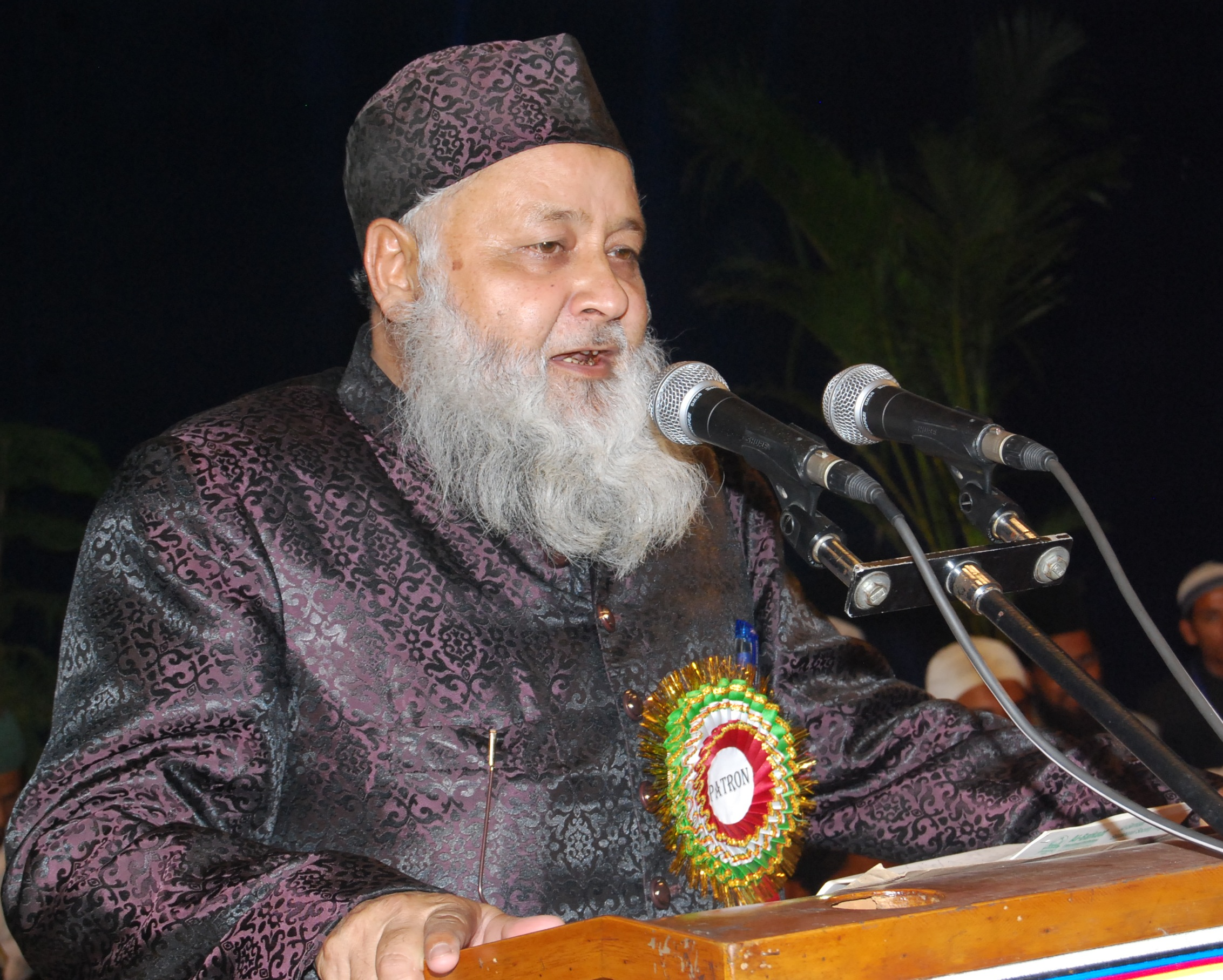

Personal life
- Born: 15. August 1955 (age 71); Marehra
- Education: Aligarh Muslim University
- Occupation: Spiritual & religious Leader of the Qadiriyya Barkatiya Silsila; Ahlus Sunnah Sufis in India

Religious life
- Religion: Islam
- Denomination: Sunni
- Jurisprudence: Hanafi
- Movement: Barelvi

Syed Muhammad Ameen Mian Qadri is the Sajjada Nashin of the Khanqah-e-Barkatiya Marehra Shareef of Qadri Order, which was the sufi order followed by Alahazrat of the Indian Sufi Barelvi movement and founder of Jamia Al Barkaat Aligarh with 50,000,000 adherents.

He was senior professor and Chairman Department of Urdu at India's prestigious Aligarh Muslim University. He has been ranked 44th in the list of 500 Most Influential Muslims of the world and only Influential Muslim from India by the Amman, Jordan-based Royal Islamic Strategic Studies Centre in collaboration with the Prince Alwaleed Bin Talal Center for Muslim-Christian Understanding at the Georgetown University, Washington DC.

== Present ==
On 6 August 2006, the English-language daily Hindustan Times, described Ameen Mian Qaudri as the main leader of the Ahle Sunnah. His silsila is known as Barkatiya which has a lineage from Qadiriyya silsila of Baghdad. It is said that his silsila has a following of around two million people in India and abroad. He has presided over many large gatherings in India and abroad.

He has worked for the educational uplift of Muslims of India, and started a chain of educational institutions in India with the prefix Al-Barkaat, including Al Barkaat Institute of Management Studies and Research, Al Barkaat Public School Boys, Al Barkaat Public School Girls, Al Barkaat department of Education, Al Barkaat institute of Graduate Studies, Al Barkaat Vocational Studies college, Al Barkaat Play and Learn Centre, Jamia Ahsanul Barkaat.
