= Arthur T. Mosher =

American agronomist (1910–1992)

Arthur Theodore Mosher
- Born: October 4, 1910; Ames, Iowa, U.S.
- Died: September 27, 1992 (aged 81); Black Mountain, North Carolina, U.S.
- Education: University of Illinois; University of Chicago
- Scientific career
- Fields: Agricultural economics; Agricultural extension
- Workplaces: Allahabad Agricultural Institute; University of Chicago

Arthur Theodore Mosher (October 4, 1910 – September 27, 1992), was an American agriculture development specialist who was the president of the Agricultural Development Council and the Principal of the Sam Higginbottom Institute of Agriculture, Technology and Sciences (at the time it was called Allahabad Agricultural Institute) in India.

== Early life and work ==
Mosher was originally from Ames, Iowa, receiving his bachelor's and master's degrees in agriculture and agriculture economics from the University of Illinois and a doctorate in economics from the University of Chicago. In the 1930s he served on a Presbyterian Church mission to India.

He returned to India and became principal of the school which would later be named Sam Higginbottom Institute of Agriculture, Technology and Sciences. The school credits him with leading during a time of major expansion and the introduction of "Jamuna Par Punar yojna", the extension project of recruiting workers at the village level.

He began working for the Agricultural Development Council and became both the executive director (1957 to 1967) and president (1967 to 1973). While Mosher was head of the Council of Economic and Cultural Affairs division of the ADC, he continued a practice of his predecessor in exercising "considerable censorship" over the texts the organization approved to be delivered to extension offices throughout the world, eliminating many requests for books on social and cultural topics.

== Getting Agriculture Moving ==
In 1965, while Director of CECA-ADC, he wrote Getting Agriculture Moving: essentials for development and modernization which was translated into many languages and promoted a "modernization theory" which typified the aid approach of the time. In his writing, Mosher identified five components necessary for successful rural and agricultural development, which was by 1987 "particularly influential" in promoting a "systems analysis" approach to development that recognizes complex interactions. The framework developed from a series of individual papers.

The five components that Mosher identified as necessary for development were:

- a market for the products,
- adaptability to changing technologies,
- locally available inputs such as equipment and supplies,
- increasing the quality and amount of agricultural land,
- the existence of a national plan to support agricultural development.

The title of the work was adopted by Peter Timmer for his work Getting Agriculture Moving: Do Market's Send the Right signals? Timmer and others place Mosher's focus on "getting agriculture moving" as appropriate for the first of four phases of development.

== Personal life ==
Mosher was married to Alice (née Wynne Hall) and together they had four children, Anne, William, Ted, and Richard. Mosher lived in Ithaca, New York for several years before moving to Black Mountain, North Carolina where he died in 1992.

== Awards ==
- Presidential World Without Hunger Award (1984)
- American Agricultural Economics Association - Fellow (1976)

== Selected bibliography ==
- Getting Agriculture Moving: essentials for development and modernization
- Training manual for group study of Getting agriculture moving
- Selected readings to accompany Getting agriculture moving, co authored with Raymond Borton
- Case Studies to Accompany Getting Agriculture Moving, co authored with Borton
- Getting agriculture moving; how modern farming can provide a better life, co authored with Deborah Homes
- Technical co-operation in Latin-American agriculture
- Serving agriculture as an administrator
- An introduction to agricultural extension
- Images of development : theirs and ours
- The story of Ram Lal, God's partner; the meaning and application of Christianity to village life
- Source book of rural missions. Volume 1, Selected readings, contributor
- This is India
