= Subharti Medical College =

Indian medical school

Netaji Subhash Chandra Bose Subharti Medical College
- Motto: Education for All
- Type: Private
- Established: 1996
- Principal: Dr. Y.P. Monga
- Director: Dr. A.K. Asthana
- Faculty: 169
- Students: 881
- Undergraduates: 150 per year
- Postgraduates: 92
- Location: Meerut, Uttar Pradesh, India
- Campus: Urban
- Website: subharti.org

Netaji Subhash Chandra Bose Subharti Medical College is an Indian medical school located at Meerut in the state Uttar Pradesh. It is a constituent of Swami Vivekanand Subharti University. The college was earlier affiliated to Dr. Bhimrao Ambedkar University in Agra.

== Description ==
The college is recognized by the Medical Council of India, and listed in W.H.O. World Directory of Medical Schools. The college has collaborations with; Centre for Public Health Kinetics, New Delhi, Johns Hopkins Bloomberg School of Public Health, Baltimore, Medical Board of California, and Global Health Learning Opportunities (GHLO) / Association of American Medical Colleges (AAMC), Washington, DC.

The college has constituted various regulatory body and committees including Ethical committee, Pharmacovigilance Committee, College Council, Academic Council, Research Degree Committee, P.G. Committee, Anti-Ragging and Anti-Sexual Harassment Committee, etc. Institutional Ethical Committee (Registration No. ECR/256/Inst/UP/2013) is registered under government of India, Rule 122DD of the Drug & Cosmetics Rules 1945.

== Location ==
The college is located in a 250-acre campus in Meerut. The college has a 980-bed free charitable block as well as the 1250-beds Chhatrapati Shivaji Subharti Hospital and Medical Research Centre on campus. The college also runs a rural hospital: Sardar Bhagat Singh Subharti Urban Health and Training Centre, Multannagar, 5 km away from the campus.

== Departments ==
The college comprises 30 departments

- Anatomy
- Physiology
- Biochemistry
- Pathology
- Pharmacology
- Microbiology
- Forensic Medicine
- Community Medicine
- Otorhinolaryngology & Head & Neck Surgery
- Ophthalmology
- General Medicine
- General surgery
- Obstetrics and Gynaecology
- Pediatrics
- Orthopaedics
- Respiratory Medicine
- Dermatology, STD & Leprosy
- Psychiatry
- Radio-diagnosis
- Radio-Therapy
- Anesthesiology & Critical Care
- Dental surgery
- Cardiology
- Urology
- Nephrology
- Plastic Surgery
- Neurology
- Emergency Medicine
- CTVS
- Neurosurgery

== Academic subdivisions ==
It comprises the following Institutes:

- Subharti Dental College
- Subharti Physiotherapy College
- Subharti's Central Research Institute
- Subharti College of Nursing
- Subharti College of Naturopathy and Yoga
- Subharti College of Pharmacy

== Notable alumni ==
- Tanaya Narendra
- Tanu Jain
- Rahil Chaudhary
- Gaurav Ahluwalia
