= Titusji =

Indian independence activist (1905–1980)

Titus Theverthundiyil

Sabarmati Ashram

Personal details
- Born: 18 February 1905 Maramon, Travancore, British India
- Died: 8 August 1980 (aged 75) Bhopal, Madhya Pradesh, India
- Education: Allahabad Agricultural Institute
- Profession: Activist

Titusji was one of the 78 marchers selected by Mahatma Gandhi to take part in the 1930 Dandi March, to break the salt law. He served as governing secretary for Gandhi's Sabarmati Ashram milk project near Ahmedabad. Gulzarilal Nanda, who later became Prime Minister of India, was the secretary of another unit. Both of them were trusted friends of Gandhi. His given name was Titus Theverthundiyil, while "Titusji" was the honorific given to him by Mahatma Gandhi.

== Gandhi's visit to Kerala ==
On 15 March 1925, Mahatma Gandhi visited Titusji's house in Maramon (Theverthundiyil) on his way to the famous Hindu temple in Aranmula near Chengannur. This was considered one of the greatest events in Central Travancore. In and around Maramon, thousands witnessed his visit.

== Early and later life ==
Titusji was born to a Marthoma Syrian Christian family. After Independence, Titusji settled in Bhopal. In 1970, he published the book "The Bharat of my Dreams". He was represented in the early 500 Rs note. He died on 8 August 1980, at the Kasthurba Hospital in Bhopal. Titusji donated half of the portion of his land to the Mar Thoma Syrian Church in Bhopal.
