= Mason Vaugh =

American agriculturalist

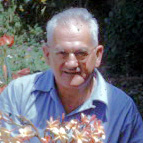
- Born: June 27, 1894; Bonne Terre, Missouri, United States
- Died: October 7, 1978 (aged 84); Ohio, United States
- Education: University of Missouri
- Scientific career
- Fields: Agricultural Engineering; Agricultural machinery
- Workplaces: Allahabad Agricultural Institute; University of Missouri; Ohio State University

Mason Vaugh (June 27, 1894 – October 7, 1978) was an American agriculturalist who developed the first agricultural engineering department outside North America in 1921 at Allahabad Agricultural Institute.

== Early life ==
Mason Vaugh was born on June 27, 1894, in Bonne Terre, Missouri. He graduated at the top of his class from grammar school and high school. He served in the US Army during World War I. In 1919 he was given a B.Sc. in agriculture from the University of Missouri and in 1928 earned the equivalent of a M.Sc. in agricultural engineering in 1928.

== Work in India ==
In 1921 he became a lay missionary in India, teaching agricultural engineering at Allahabad Agricultural Institute.

Vaugh adapted traditional Indian materials into modern agricultural implements. Among his innovations was the Shabash, an improved plow consisting of a plowshare, a moldboard, a few bolts and a wood beam. Improved implements such as the Shabash made it possible for farmers to plow larger areas than previously possible.

Vaugh introduced several other implements, such as hoes, cultivators and the wheat threshers. He was the leader of the Agricultural Development Society (ADS), established in Naini to manufacture and sell improved implements developed by ADS and the institute. He retired in 1957 and returned to the United States.

He has often been called the father of agricultural engineering in India. In his honor Indian Society of Agricultural Engineers (ISAE) established the Mason Vaughn Agricultural Engineering Pioneer Award. Prof. Ralph C. Hay was the first recipient of this award for his contribution in establishing agricultural engineering programs at IIT Kharagpur (1954–56) and Pantnagar University (1962–64).

== See also ==
- Vaugh School of Agricultural Engineering and Technology
