= SIS Limited =

Indian security management company

- Trade name: SIS Limited
- Traded as: NSE: SIS; BSE: 540673
- Founded: 1985; 41 years ago in Patna, Bihar, India
- Founder: Ravindra Kishore Sinha
- Headquarters: New Delhi, India
- Number of locations: 446 total offices (2026)
- Area served: India; Australia; New Zealand; Singapore
- Key people: Rituraj Kishore Sinha Group Managing Director
- Number of employees: 3,57,028
- Website: SIS India

SIS Group Enterprise (formerly Security and Intelligence Services (India)) is a private security firm in India, Australia, New Zealand and Singapore. It was set up in 1985 by Ravindra Kishore Sinha who was an Indian billionaire businessman and journalist, which is now led by his son Rituraj Sinha as Group Managing Director. SIS Group is one of the largest manpower security firms in the Indo-Pacific region with sales in excess of ₹15,982 crore (FY2026). The company offers Security, Cash Logistics, and Facility Management Services in India, Australia, and a few Asia-Pacific regions. Ravindra Kishore Sinha was the Chairman and Rituraj Kishore Sinha is the group managing director of the SIS Ltd.

== History ==
=== Origins ===
SIS Group Enterprise, formerly known as Security and Intelligence Services (SIS India), was set up in Patna, Bihar, in 1978 by RK Sinha. The inception of the company by RK Sinha occurred after his career as a Trainee reporter ended in 1973. He set up the Security and Intelligence Services India Ltd. company in a small Garage in Patna with Rs 250 at 23 years old.

=== 1985–1990 ===
In its foundation year, 1986, SIS India launched its Graduate Trainee Officer (GTO) program initiated to build a cadre of security officers and managers. The company also employed a workforce between 250-300 people with a turnover of ₹1 Lakh.

In 1989, SIS India developed a DOS-based software program for payroll & its management on 486 computers.

=== 1991–2006 ===
In 1991, SIS India completed the milestone of crossing its employee count beyond 1000.

In 1998, SIS India obtained ISO Certification, becoming the first Indian Security company to acquire it.

In 2002, Rituraj Kishore Sinha, an alumnus of Leeds University Business School, joined his family business, SIS. As part of a larger professional management team, the initial focus was on business process reengineering and geographical expansion of SIS which was an INR 25 crore company at that point but a very well regarded brand in the industry.

In 2004, SIS India developed and launched the first integrated end-to-end ERP platform.

=== 2006–2021 ===
In 2007, SIS India commenced its West India operations by the inauguration of its regional office in Mumbai. In the same year, The company also received approximately ₹50 crores investment from DE Shaw, Hedge Funds Firm.

In 2008, SIS acquired Australia's largest security company, Chubb Security, becoming the first Indian multinational in security services. The acquisition of the Australian guarding and mobile patrol business unit of US industrial conglomerate United Technologies was handled by Citigroup on their behalf.

In 2010, SIS India launched its Electronic Security arm under the name of TECH SIS.

In 2011, SIS India formed a joint venture with Prosegur called SIS Prosegur for providing SIS Cash Services.

On 24 August 2011, SIS announced that it is entering into a joint venture with Terminix, to perform pest and termite control in India. The venture incorporated Pest Control Segment into its Facilities Management Segment and is called TerminiXSIS.

In 2013, SIS India received ₹550 crores investment from CX Partners, a private equity firm, affirming history's largest PE investment in the Security Sector. In 2014, SIS India celebrated its 40th anniversary, with its consolidated revenue crossing Rs 2500 crore. The company also acquires the ISS cash business and rebrands it as SISCO.

In 2016, SIS India made over Rs 4000 crore in revenue, besides acquiring Dusters, becoming India's 4th largest Facility Management Provider.

In 2017, the SIS Group IPO was launched, making the company the first in the nation to become listed.

In 2018, SIS India consolidated its leadership position in India Security & FM by acquiring stakes in SLV, Bengaluru-based Uniq Detective and Security Services & Rare Hospitality and Services Pvt. Ltd.

In 2019, SIS India crossed a workforce of more than 200,000 with over $1 Billion in revenues. The company also consolidated APAC leadership in Security by acquiring Henderson& Platform 4 Group.

In 2021, SIS Group’s Q3FY22 was a record quarter for the company with its highest ever revenue at Rs. 2,601 crore said Rituraj Sinha. SIS India was felicitated as one of the Best Mega Employers in India. Also, It has been recognized as a “Great Place to work” by the GPTW Institute India. Mr. Rituraj Sinha credited his employees with the achievement and said they would strive to achieve further heights.

=== Since 2022 ===
In 2022, SIS crossed Rs 10,000 crore annual revenue mark for the first time. SIS has reported consolidated revenue for FY22 at Rs 10,059 crore.

In FY22, SIS entered into the Rs10,000-crore revenue club by clocking Rs10,059.1 crore, a growth of over 10.2 percent over the last fiscal. The security services, facility management and cash logistics major took just five years to double its revenue. Rituraj Sinha, however, uses a long-term lens to make sense of the data. “From Rs25 crore in 2002 to Rs10,000 crore in 2022. That’s our story,” he says. He quickly qualifies his statement. “It’s a profitable and sustainable story,”

Addressing the press and the investors Group Managing Director of Group SIS Mr. Rituraj Sinha expressed confidence that the group would continue to grow to greater heights and become an industry leader in the fields of security services, facility management and cash logistics and suitably rewards its employees and investors alike.

== Operations ==
=== Activities/Services ===
The company offers security services to banks, hotels, institutions, IT & ITES, residential colonies, Retail and commercial establishments. It also offers electronic security systems, consulting, housekeeping and security services like Pre-employment Verification & Surveillance, Cash services which include the transfer of cash and valuables and ATM replenishment and recruitment and training services.

=== India & Overseas ===
The company has over 22,000 customers which include major industry players such as Tata Steel, Tata Motors, ICICI Bank, Idea Cellular and Future Group.

Over the last decade, company has diversified its domestic play and opted for an aggressive inorganic route to expand overseas.

=== Operating Structure ===
SIS Group Enterprise segments its business structure into three key areas:

- Security Services which include services for security design, fire safety, event security, VIP protection, aviation security, emergency response, investigation work, and integrated man-tech.
- Cash Logistics Services which are offered under SIS Prosegur, in partnership with Spain’s Prosegur - Security Company, to provide cash-in-transit, doorstep banking, ATM-related services, Precious Cargo, bullion management, and cash vaulting services.
- Facility Management Services which include Soft Facility Management and Hard Facility Management Operations & Management.

=== Covid Vaccinations ===
SIS Group, has completed inoculating 102,008 employees of its 2,30,000 workforce. This was done through Humare Heroes Vaccination Drive (HHVD) launched on May 1, 2021, within a record timeframe of 30 days. “While we put a lot of effort in arranging the vaccines for our employees, the availability and feasibility helped our team to turn this into a reality,” said Rituraj Sinha, managing group director, SIS Ltd.

== Key People ==
SIS Group Enterprise had the following board of directors:

Name	Position	Year Elected
Ravindra Kishore Sinha		1985
Rituraj Kishore Sinha	Board Member	2002
Rituraj Kishore Sinha	Chairman, Group COO, Group MD	2008
Uday Singh	Board Member/Management Committee Member	2002
