= Tanaya Narendra =

Indian sexual health educator

Tanaya Narendra Cuterus
- Born: Prayagraj, Uttar Pradesh
- Education: Subharti Medical College (MBBS); University of Oxford (MSc)
- Known for: Dr Cuterus, sexual health education, HPV vaccine awareness
- Website: drcuterus.com

Tanaya Narendra, also known as Dr. Cuterus, is an Indian doctor, sexual health educator, embryologist, and instagram influencer.

In the year 2022, Tanaya received the Health Influencer of the Year award from the IHW Council, supported by NITI Aayog and Ayushman Bharat, in recognition of her contributions to the field of public health.

She has been recognized for her contributions to the field of public health, including being listed among the Top 100 Digital Stars by Forbes in both 2023 and 2024, and being recognized as the Elle Wellness Expert in 2023.

== Education and career ==
Narendra was born to fertility doctors, which exposed her to conversations about sexual health from an early age. She pursued her medical studies in India and obtained an MBBS degree from Subharti Medical College, Meerut. Later, she relocated to the UK to study the science of assisted reproduction. She enrolled at the University of Oxford and pursued a Master's degree in Clinical Embryology. Her time in the UK also allowed her to register as a doctor in England.

She is recognized as a Fellow of the Royal Society for Public Health (FRSPH). In 2020, she started her Instagram account called Dr. Cuterus, to address the misinformation surrounding sexual health on the internet. She shares informative content on various aspects of sexual health. Narendra serves as a scientific advisor to government and non-government organizations, contributing expertise in education methods and the sexual health needs of youth.

She authored a book titled ‘Dr. Cuterus- Everything Nobody Tells You About Your Body’ which was published in December 2022. The book became a bestseller and has been translated into multiple languages, including a Marathi edition released in 2024.

Tanaya has spoken about the HPV vaccine on her social media platforms and has submitted a petition to the Government of India to include the vaccine in the National Immunisation Protocol.

== Awards and achievements ==
- 2020: Sexual Health Influencer of the Year 2020 by SH24 for her contributions to medical education in the field of sexual health.
- 2020: Sexual Health Influencer of the Year 2020.
- 2021: Featured among iDiva's '50 Most Beautiful Women in India' for 2021.
- 2021: Top 25 Disruptors of India 2021 by Cosmopolitan Magazine.
- 2022: Health Influencer of the Year by the IHW Council.
- 2023: was recognized as the Elle Wellness Expert of 2023.
- 2023 & 2024: Tanaya was included in Forbes Magazine's list of Top 100 Digital Stars in 2023 and 2024.
- 2024: Sexual Wellness Expert Award in 2024 by Dainik Jagran.
- 2024: Winner of the DNA Women Achievers Awards 2024 in the Healthcare category.
- 2024: Businessworld Healthcare World 40 Under 40.
