= Sam Higginbottom University of Agriculture, Technology and Sciences =

Agricultural university in Prayagraj, India

- Motto: "Serve The Land . Feed The Hungry"
- Type: Agricultural university
- Established: 1910; 116 years ago
- Affiliations: ICAR, UGC, ACU AIU IAU IAUA
- Chancellor: Jetti A. Oliver
- Vice-Chancellor: Jonathan A. Lal
- Faculty: 454
- Students: 12331
- Undergraduates: 8068
- Postgraduates: 4263
- Location: Prayagraj, Uttar Pradesh, India; 25.4137°N 81.8491°E
- Campus: 1,040 acres (4,200,000 m^{2}) Sub-Urban
- Colors: Red, green and yellow
- Website: shuats.edu.in

Sam Higginbottom University of Agriculture, Technology and Sciences (SHUATS), formerly Allahabad Agricultural Institute, is a government-aided minority-agricultural university in Prayagraj, Uttar Pradesh, India. It operates as an autonomous Christian minority institution under the 'Sam Higginbottom Educational and Charitable Society, Allahabad'.

It was established in 1910 by Sam Higginbottom as "Allahabad Agricultural Institute" to improve the economic status of the rural population. In 1942, it became the first institute in India to offer a degree in Agricultural Engineering.

In December 2016, the Uttar Pradesh State cabinet announced their decision to elevate the institution from the status of Deemed University to full-fledged University by passing the SHUATS Act operational from 29 December 2016, thus renaming it to SHUATS.

As a tribute to its founder, the institution submitted a proposal to the Ministry of Human Resource Development in 2009 to rename Allahabad Agricultural Institute as Sam Higginbottom Institute of Agriculture, Technology and Sciences. The institute was conferred deemed university status on 15 March 2000 and was certified as a Christian Minority Educational Institution in December 2005. Earlier the MHRD placed SHUATS among the elite category 'A' deemed universities on the basis of the expert committee recommendation.

The academic infrastructure of the university is organized into six Faculties—Agriculture; Engineering and Technology; Science; Theology; Management, Humanities and Social Sciences; and Health Sciences—which consist of 15 constituent schools, over 60 academic departments and four advanced research centres with emphasis on scientific, agricultural, technological education and research. The university is an alma mater to many notable scientists, geneticist, agricultural engineers and often regarded as the progenitor of Green Revolution in India.

While having completed its own hospital, Hayes Memorial Mission Hospital, the university is developing its health and medical science infrastructure as per Medical Council of India (MCI) norms.

== Accreditation and affiliations ==
SHUATS is a recognized member of Association of Indian Universities, Association of Commonwealth Universities, Indian Agricultural Universities Association and International Association of Universities. The university has been re-accredited with a CGPA of 3.14 on a four-point scale and has received an 'A' grade from the National Assessment and Accreditation Council (NAAC), valid till October 2018. SHUATS was accredited in 2009 by Indian Council of Agricultural Research (ICAR) and in 2010 by Indian Council of Forestry Research and Education (ICFRE).

== History ==
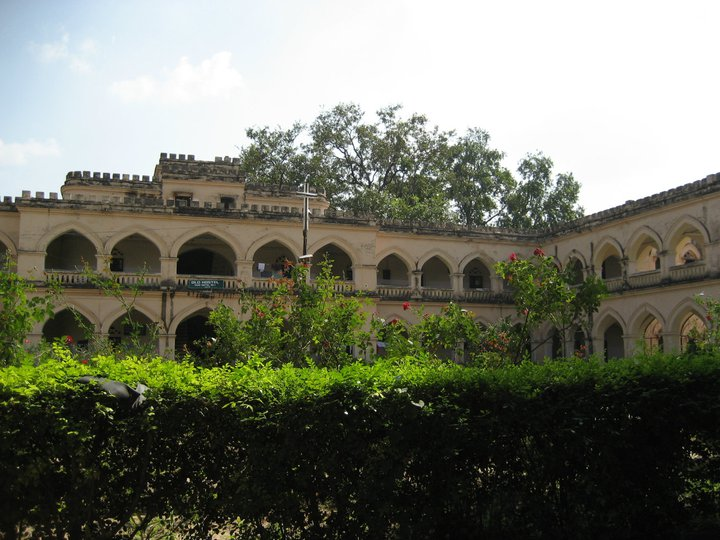
Façade of the Old Hostel of the institute

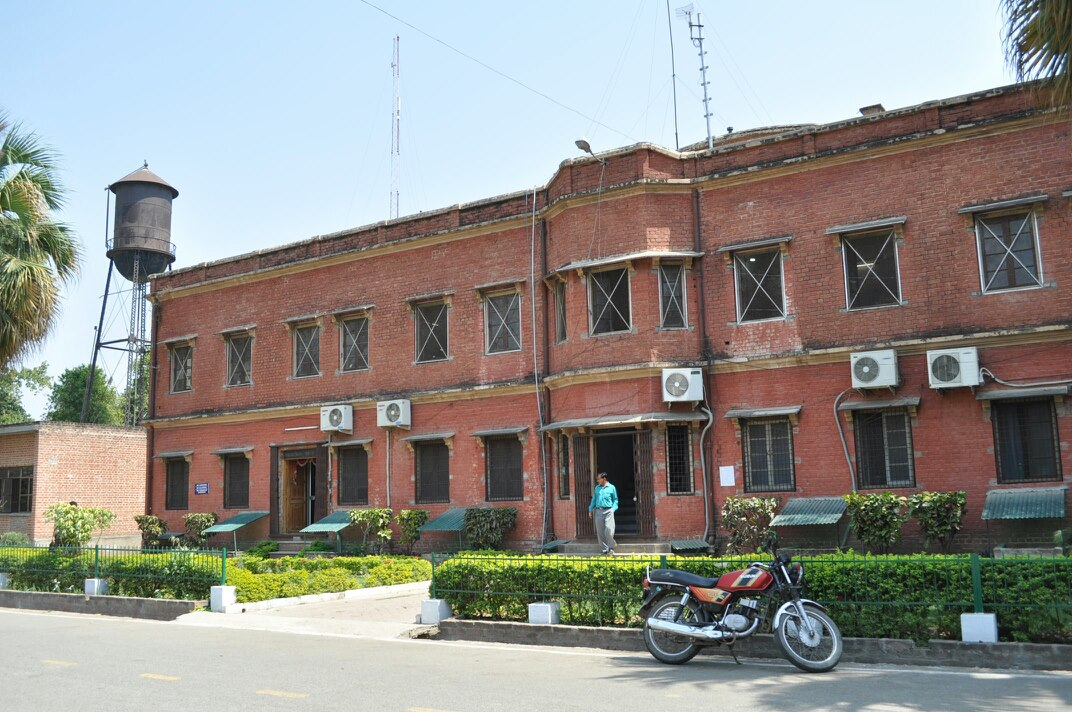
Old Engineering Building of the institute, an antiquated water tank can be seen in the background

The institute was established by Dr. Sam Higginbottom, an English-born Presbyterian missionary in 1910 as the Department of Agricultural Economics and an Extension of Ewing Christian College, Allahabad. The institute was declared as a separate entity from the college in 1918. The Department of Animal Husbandry was the first department of the institute established in 1924. It was an important landmark in the history of dairy training in India as the admission to the first batch of Indian Diploma in Dairying (IDD) was conducted here. After a meeting in Benaras, Dr. Higginbottom and Mahatma Gandhi became friends and started exchanging letters on issues such as agriculture, poverty alleviation and rural economy. Gandhiji visited the institute in 1929 and sought his advice on several occasions. In the 1930s, the institute was supported by Harvard-Yenching Institute to expand its teaching and research programme in agricultural sciences. About the same time the institute was recognized by the government for a Bachelor of Science degree in Agriculture science and became affiliated with the University of Allahabad. Another landmark came in 1942, when it became the pioneer institute to offer an Agricultural Engineering degree in India. In November 1947, the institute was brought under an independent "Board of Directors of the Allahabad Agricultural Institute" which was sponsored as an ecumenical body by a number of churches and missions. During this phase the institute was taken up by Arthur T. Mosher, and he is largely credited with major expansion of infrastructure and the introduction of famous "Jamuna Par Punar Yojna", the extension project of recruiting workers at the village level.

Between 1950 and 1957 Albert Mayer, an American architect, was assigned for developing the major buildings of the institute. In 1951, the Ford Foundation granted $940,000 to the institute for carrying out the research and development projects. In 1952, the University of Illinois signed a contract with the United States Agency for International Development for assisting the institute in improving its educational programs. Between 1950 and 1980, John B. Chitamber led the institute successfully and made Agricultural extension a very well known programme of the institute. To obtain more academic freedom and to strengthen its research and extension programmes, a proposal was submitted to the Department of Higher Education, Ministry of Human Resource Development in August 1994, that the institute be granted the status of a deemed university. The institute was conferred the same on 15 March 2000 and Dr. Rajendra B. Lal was appointed as the first vice-chancellor of the university.

== Campus ==
The campus is in Naini, a satellite neighbourhood of Prayagraj on the banks of river Yamuna. The university is spread over an area of 1040 acres lush-green campus, which includes 440 acres of research farms. The campus is divided into clusters of constituent schools and separate blocks for administration. The academic area chiefly comprises the main building, departmental annexes and auditoria. The university has 12 hostels on campus, six women's, four men's and two international hostels.

The campus has an open-air theatre for cultural events. Several football, hockey and cricket grounds; and tennis, basketball, squash and volleyball courts are built on campus. The university has a primary school, middle school and two inter colleges housed in independent buildings, to meet the education requirements of the children of employees and of neighbouring area. The campus houses a shopping complex, several cafeterias, restaurants, ATMs, post office, a centre of Krishi Vigyan Kendra and a branch of the State Bank of India.

SHUATS campus
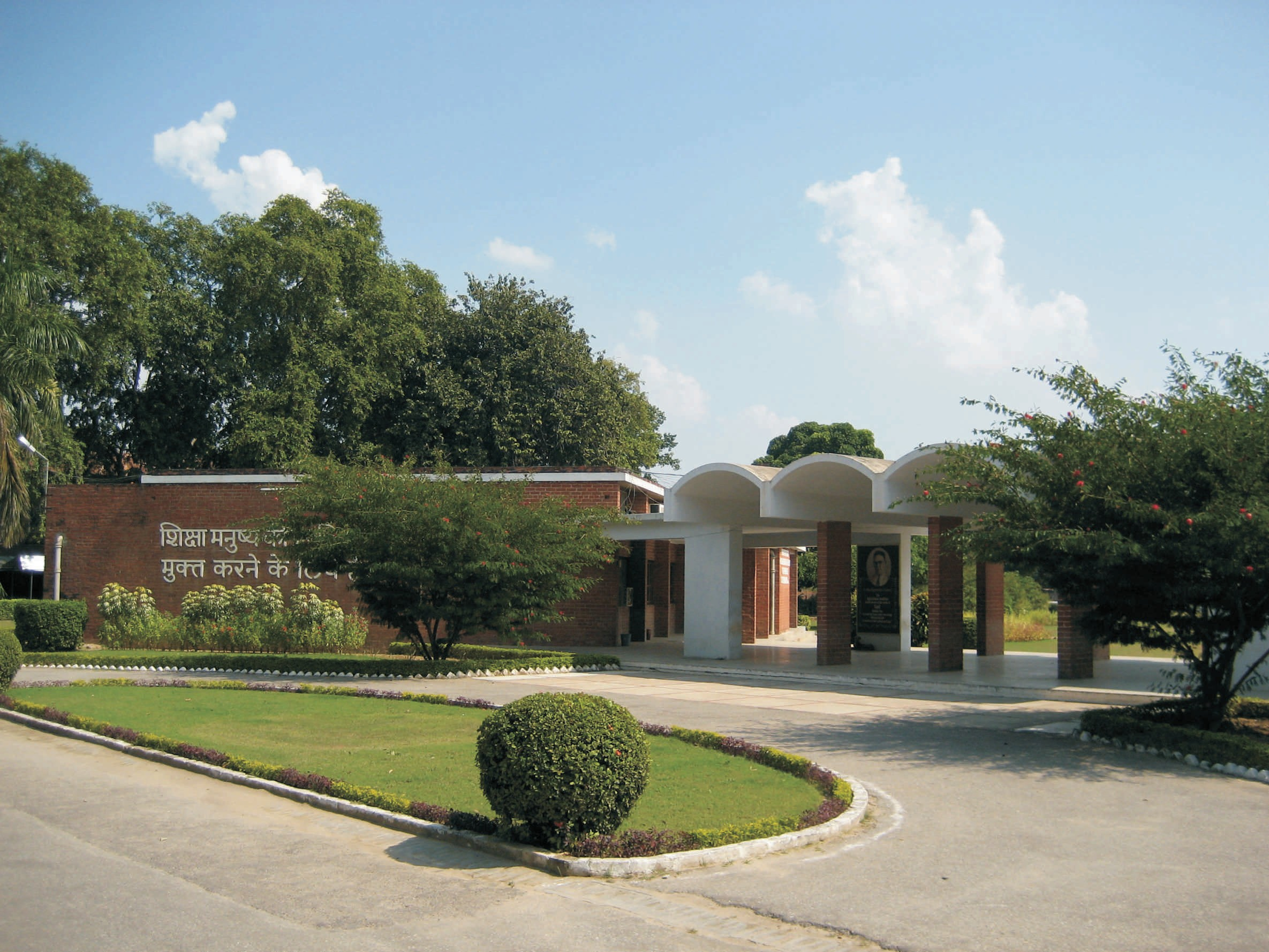
Administrative Block – I

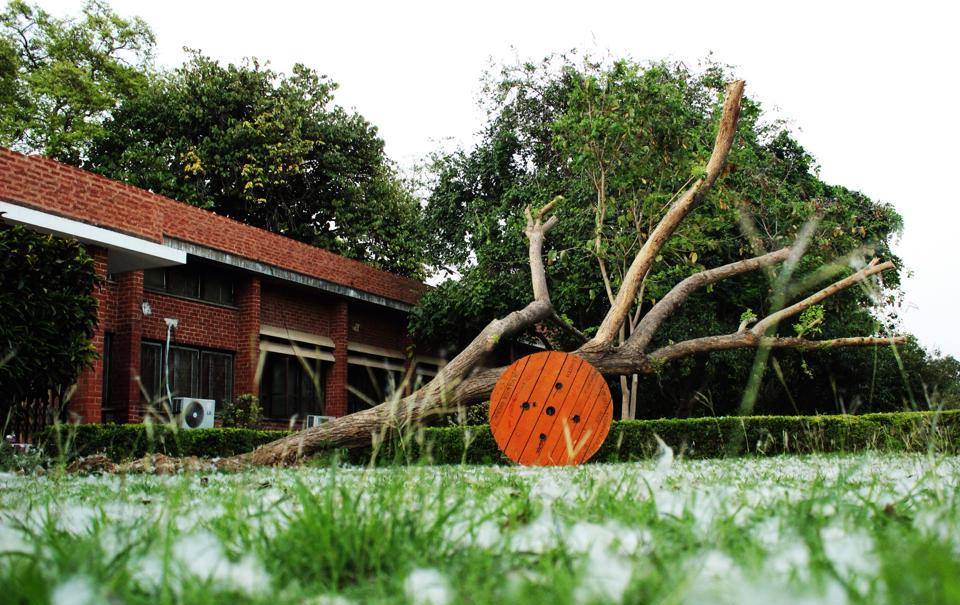
Registrar's Office

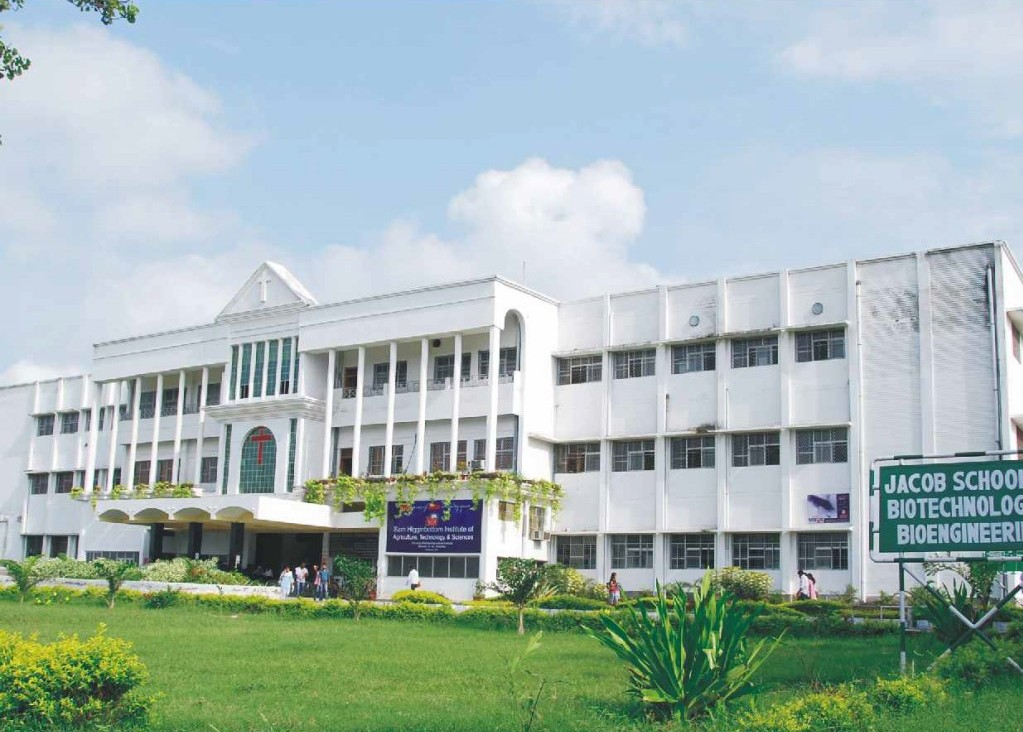
Jacob Institute of Bioengineering

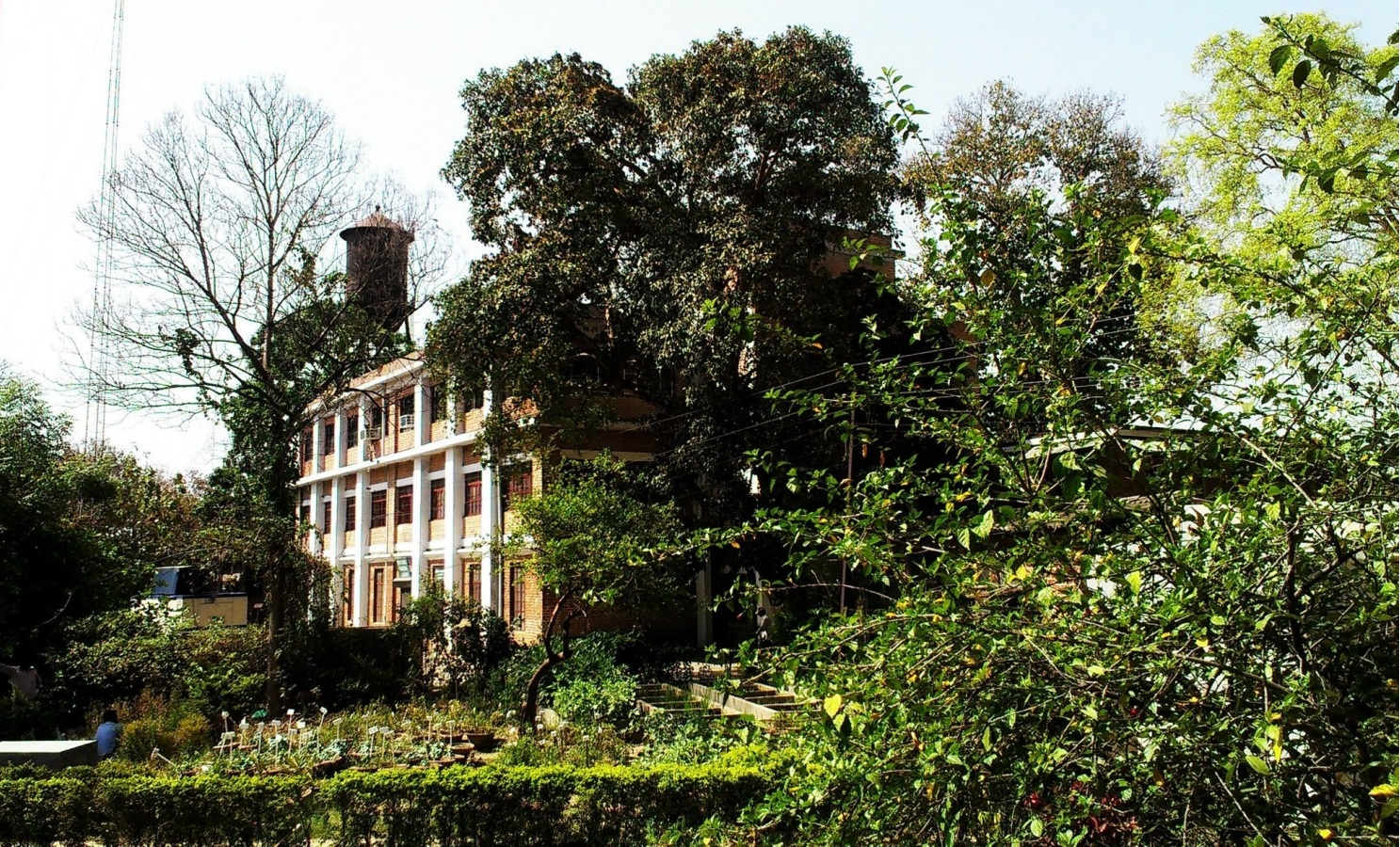
Naini Agricultural Institute

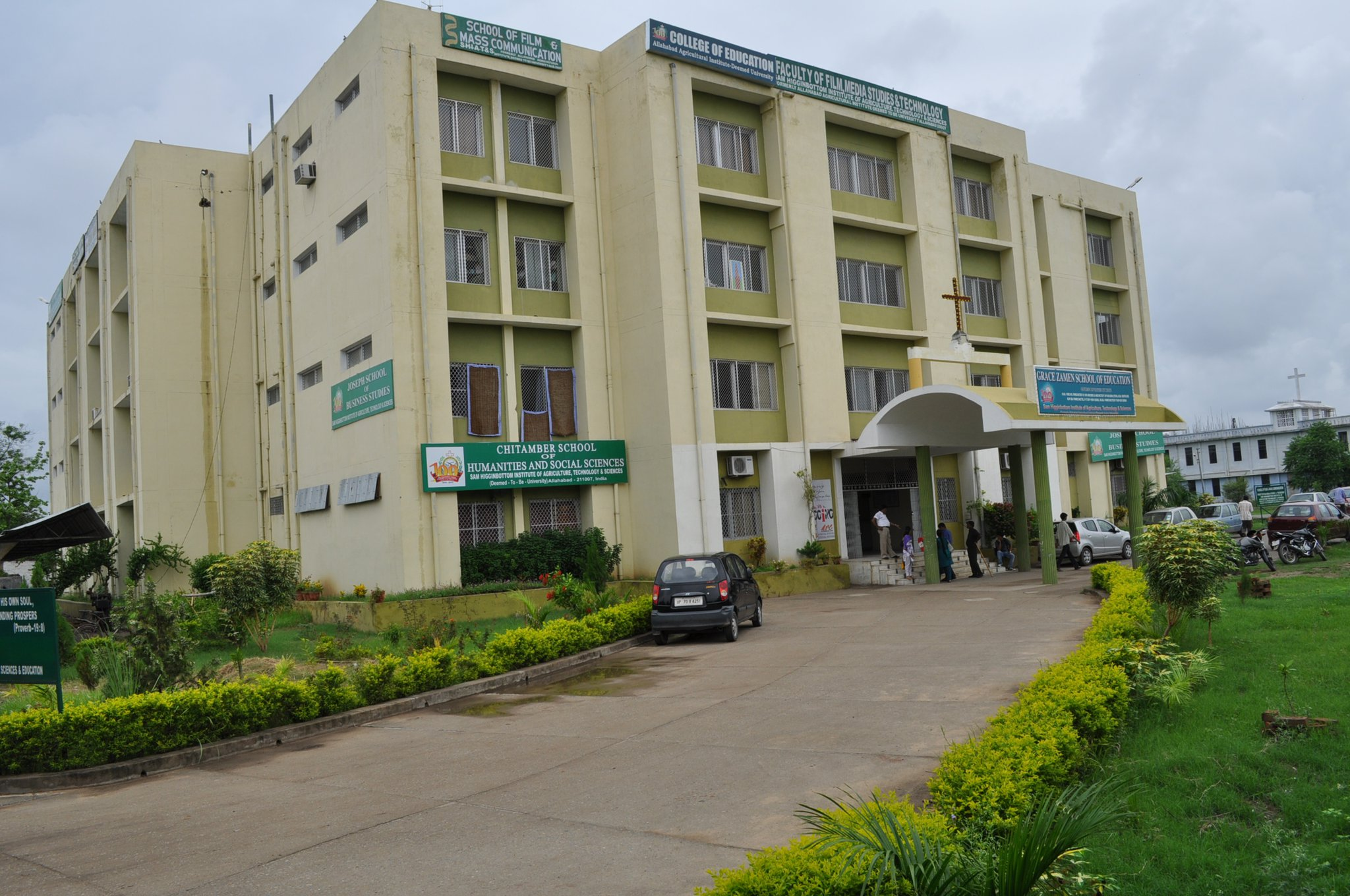
School of Humanities and Social Science

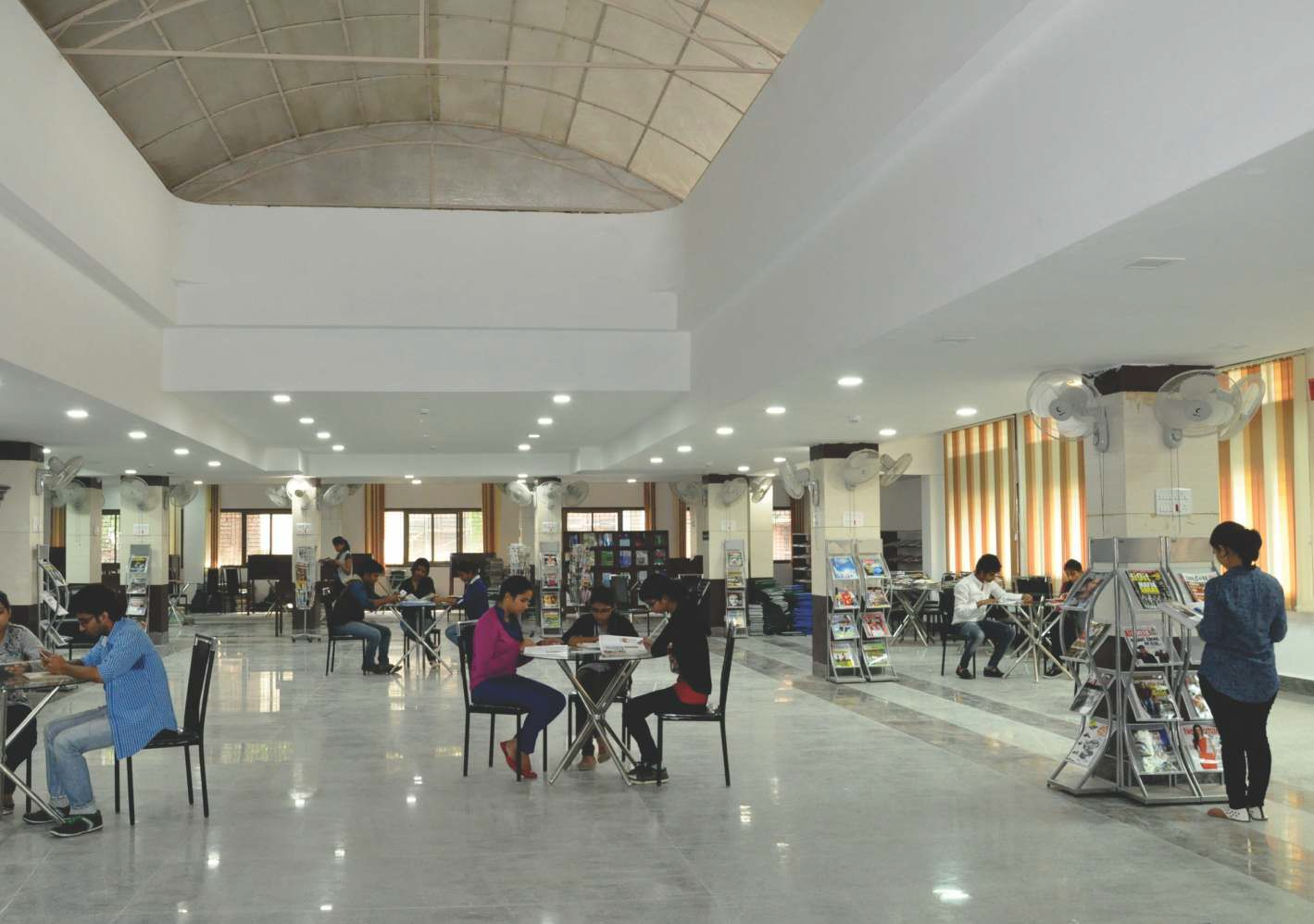
Central Library

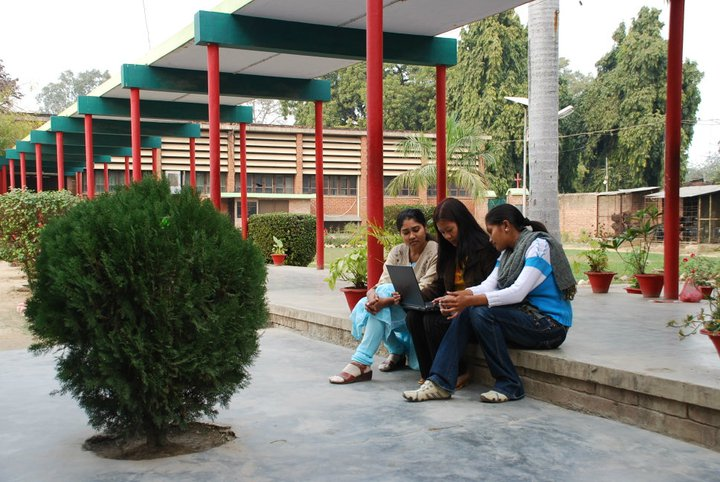
Women's Hostel

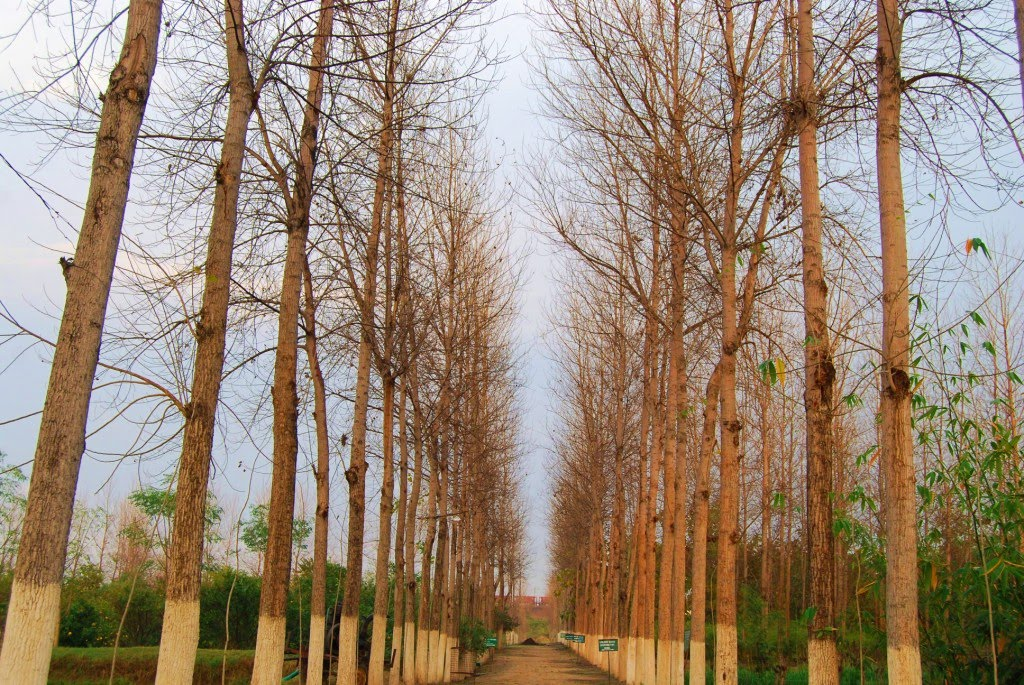
Agroforestry Farmland

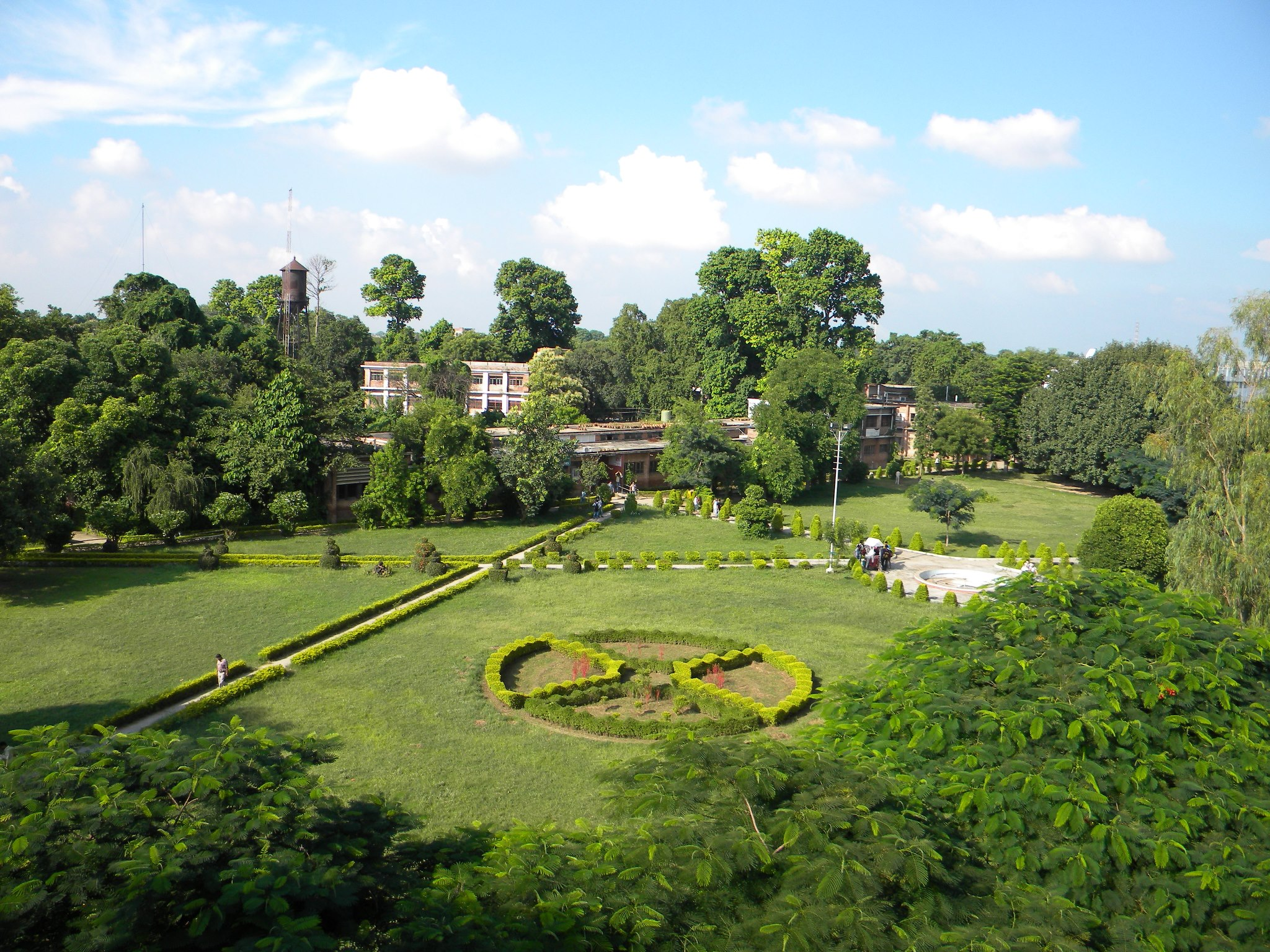
The Arboretum at SHUATS

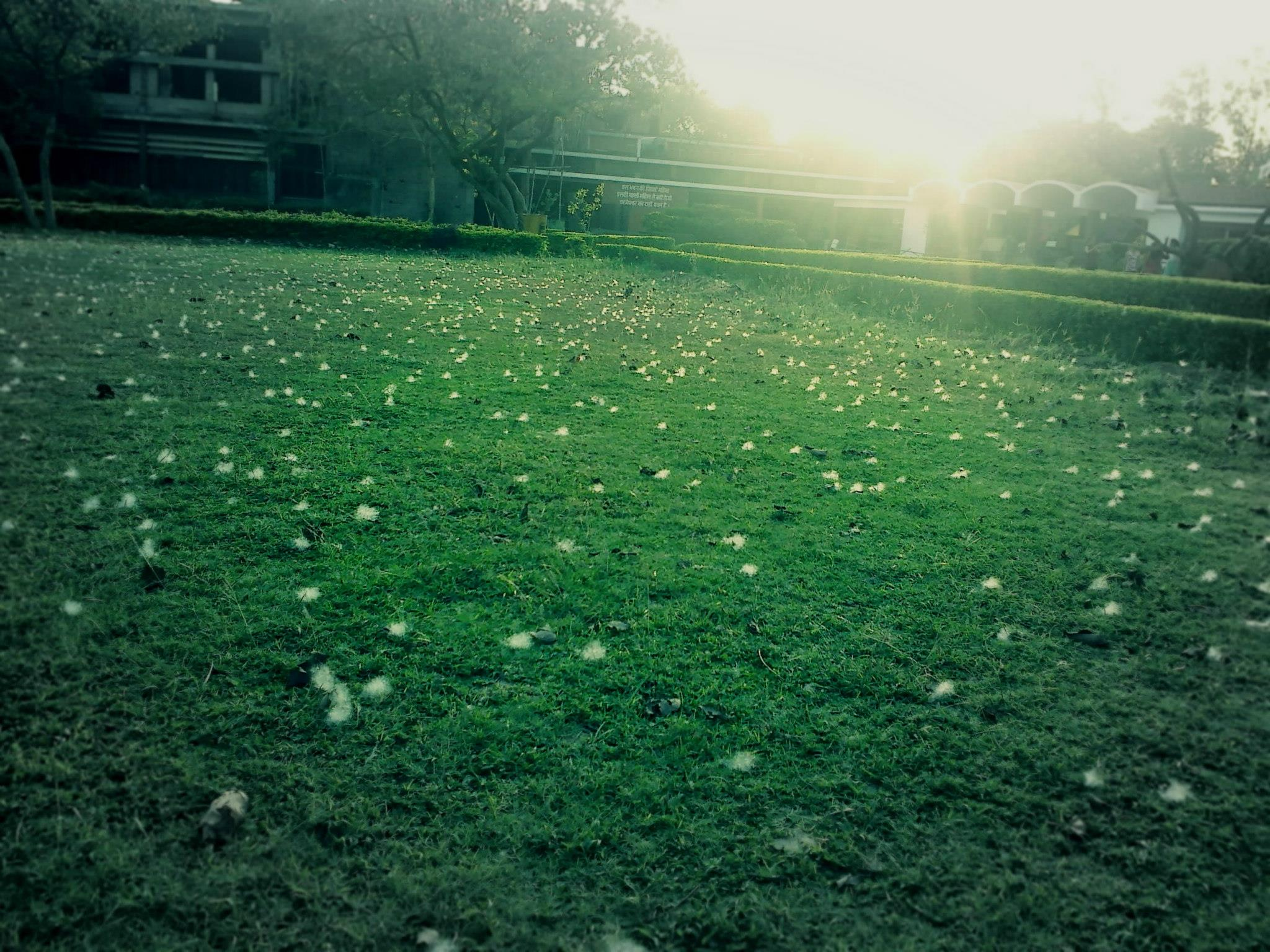
University Central Park

== Academics ==
SHUATS is a multi-faculty residential academic institution. The university offers over 50 undergraduate programmes, 100+ postgraduate programmes, several diploma/certificate programmes and doctoral programmes with over 10,000 students enrolled on campus.

Faculty/school
Faculty of Engineering & Technology
Jacob Institute of Biotechnology and Bioengineering
Warner College of Dairy Technology
Vaugh Institute of Agricultural Engineering and Technology
Faculty of Agriculture
Naini Agricultural Institute
College of Forestry
Ethelind College of Community Science
Makino School of Continuing and Non-Formal Education
Faculty of Science
Faculty of Theology
Gospel and Plough Institute of Theology
Yeshu Darbar Bible School
Faculty of Management, Humanities and Social Sciences
Joseph Institute of Business Studies and Commerce
Allahabad School of Education
Chitamber School of Humanities and Social Sciences
School of Film and Mass Communication
Faculty of Health Sciences
Shalom Institute of Health and Allied Sciences
Christian College of Nursing

=== Research and collaboration ===
Research centres
Centre for Transgenic Studies
Centre of Advance Theological Studies
Centre for Geospatial Technologies
Kattesh Katti Institute of Green Nanotechnology and Agri Nanotechnology

The university provides an ample infrastructure for interdisciplinary collaborative research and interaction between students and faculty. The major research areas include agronomy, mechanised agriculture, food processing, silviculture, genetic engineering, pharmacology, plant pathology, applied microbiology and computational biology. The research activities are funded through extramural research grants from government agencies such as ICAR, DBT, NRSC, DST, MHRD, MRD, UPCAR, EU and USDA.

The Allahabad Farmer is a peer-reviewed open access scientific journal of the university which has been publishing research articles in basic and applied aspects of agriculture technology and sciences. First published in 1925, it is perhaps one of the oldest journal dedicated to agricultural research. The university has been a collaborating partner of Global Forum on Agricultural Research and Innovation (GFAR), headquartered in Rome, Italy for research in food security, climate change and agricultural education.

The university is currently hosting over 350 international students from Australia, Brazil, Japan, South Korea, Guyana, Thailand, Middle East, neighbouring South Asian and several African nations. SHUATS has signed MoUs with more than 20 international organizations for academics and research including, Maastricht University, University of Copenhagen, University of Queensland, Biola University, Alabama A&M University, Hannam University, and University of Twente among others. The university has been in collaboration with a Thailand-based Asian Institute of Technology for academic-exchange programme since 2011. In 2015, SHUATS collaborated with University of Missouri and has established a nanotechnology research centre to explore the potential of green nanotechnology on agricultural economy. In 2022, the university teams up with the International Rice Research Institute for drought resistance breeding programme.

== Career and placement ==
The university has established a Career Planning & Counselling Centre (CPCC). The CPCC invites companies for campus recruitment and placement assistance. Besides, the centre facilitates entrepreneurial and soft skills training, summer internships, career counselling and other personality development programs to the students. Some of the major recruiters of the university are Infosys, Larsen & Toubro, HCL, Wipro, Amdocs, ThoughtWorks, Union Bank of India, Hindustan Construction Company, ITC Limited, Amul, Mother Dairy, Nestlé, Parle, Sonalika International, Bayer Crop Science, John Deere, TAFE, Escorts Tractors, Mahindra & Mahindra Limited, Force Motors, Jain Irrigation, IFFCO, Chambal Fertilisers, BASF, KRIBHCO, SABMiller, Cordlife, GlaxoSmithKline, Thyrocare and Lupin Limited.

== Student activities ==
Extra-curricular activities such as sporting events, festivals, and cultural functions are organised throughout the year. The students are divided into four houses, Red Eagles, Blue Bulls, Yellow Tigers and Pink Panthers for inter-house games and sports tournaments. The athletics committee is formed to govern the activities under the Department of Physical Education. A student-run community radio station, Radio Adan (90.4 MHz) brings together experts, students, farmers, and the local population, through various popular programs, focussing on agriculture, education, employment, women empowerment, child marriage, health, and culture. The academic societies and cultural clubs on the campus organise national and international competitions, symposiums, conferences and workshops. Students are encouraged to join the National Cadet Corps or enrol in National Service Scheme for overall personality development.

Events and Activities at SHUATS
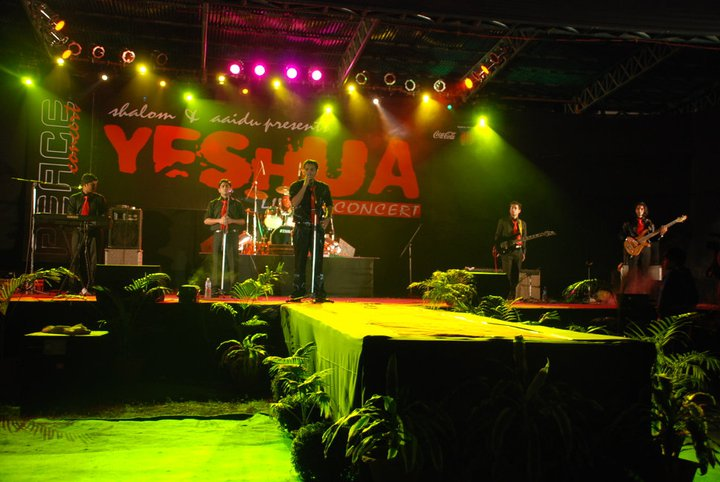
Annual Cultural Festival

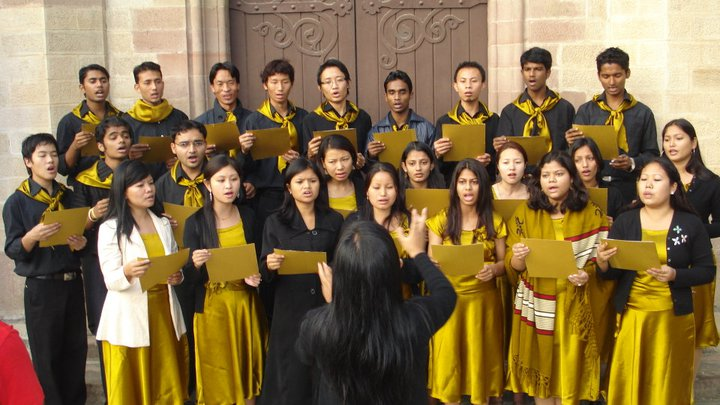
SHUATS Chapel Choir

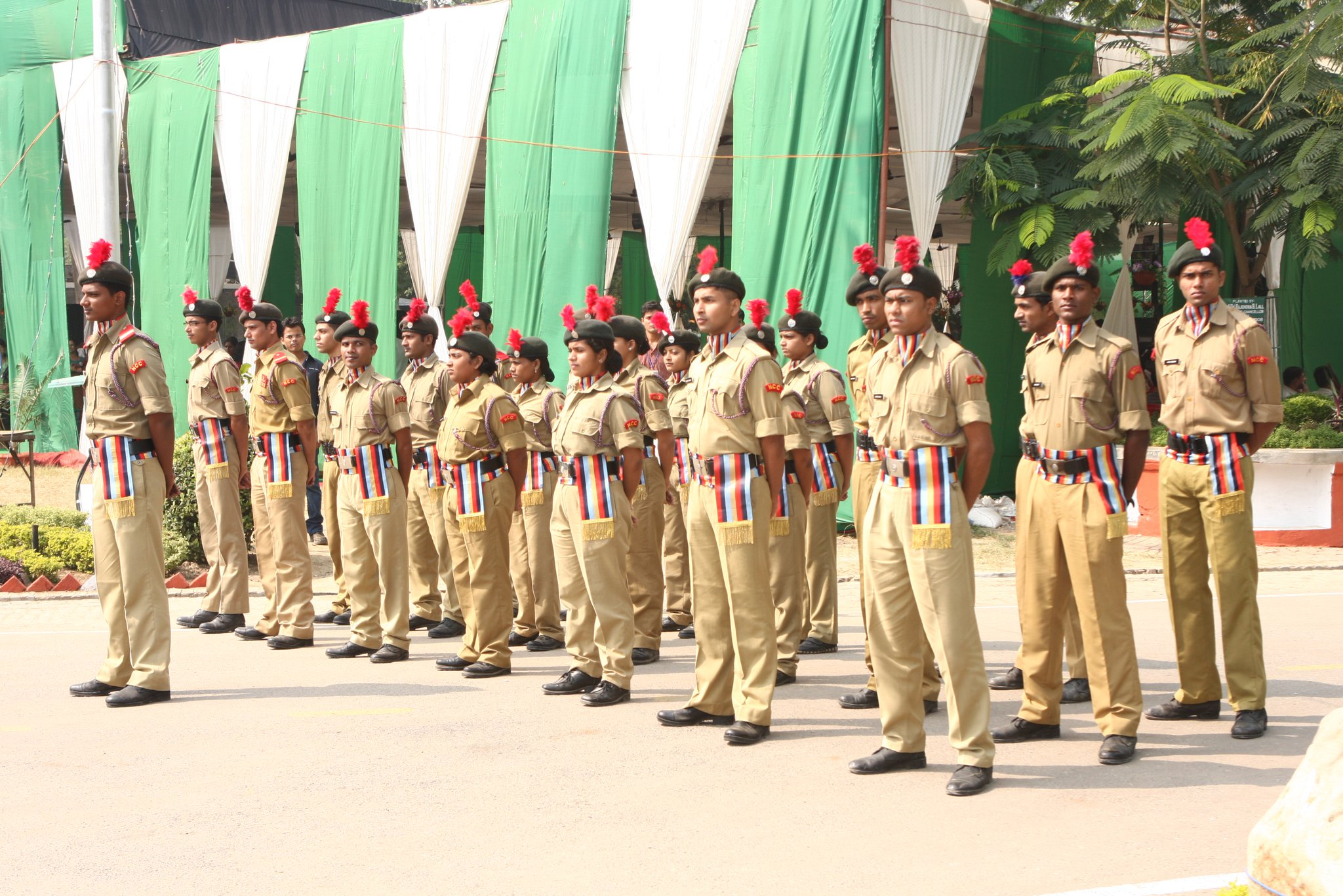
NCC unit of SHUATS

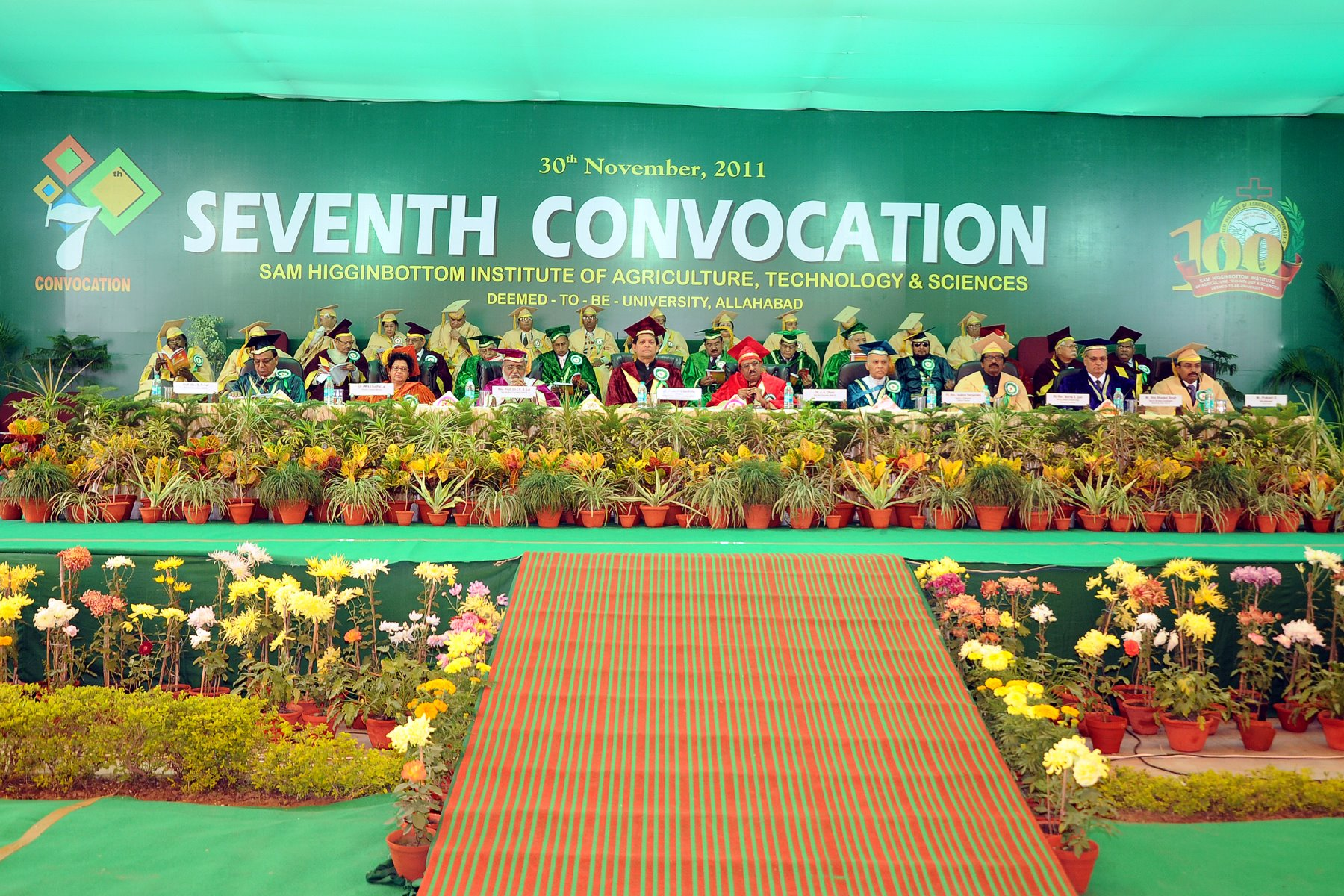
Convocation ceremony

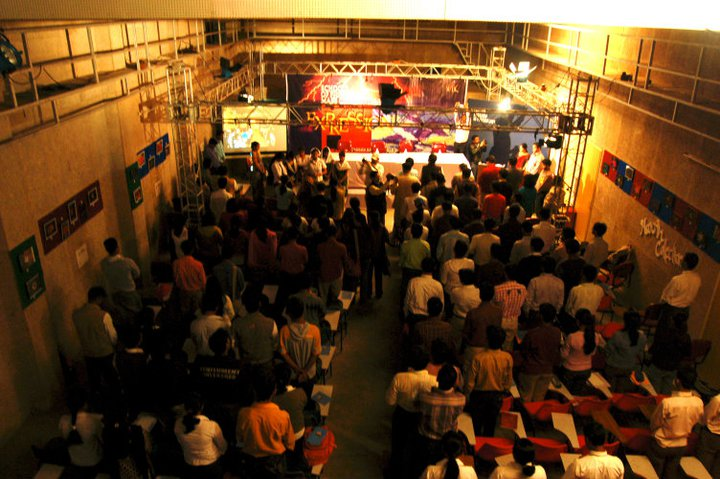
Expression Film Festival

== Alumni association ==
The students, alumni, and faculty members of the university are traditionally referred as "Aggies." The university has an active alumni association, governed by an executive committee with the objective of expanding and strengthening the connections between alumni and alma mater. An international alumni association, Alagin International, started in the year 2002, has been organizing annual meetings in various cities and also connects Aggies through social media.

== Rankings ==
University rankings

General – international
- QS (Asia) (2024): 292

Pharmacy – India
- NIRF (2024): 85

SHUATS is ranked 292 in Asian University Rankings in 2025. It is ranked 85th in India by the NIRF in the pharmacy category in 2024.

== Notable people ==
SHUATS has a widespread alumni network of agriculturists, life scientists and agricultural engineers taking over many prestigious positions across the world. Some of the prominent people associated with the university include agricultural scientists, Rajiv Khosla, Pramod Ramteke, Arthur T. Mosher and Mason Vaugh, independence activists, Titus Theverthundiyil and Seth Achal Singh, educationists and scholars, Valson Thampu and John B. Chitamber, sportsperson, Yash Dayal, politicians, Anil Agrawal, Jitendra Prasada, Fateh Bahadur Singh, Amarnath Pradhan, and Sasmit Patra, theologists and administrators, K. Reuben Mark, Vishal Mangalwadi and John Lawrence Goheen, sociologists, Charlotte Viall Wiser and William H. Wiser among others.
