= Ravindra Kishore Sinha =

Indian businessman and politician (1951–2026)

R K Sinha
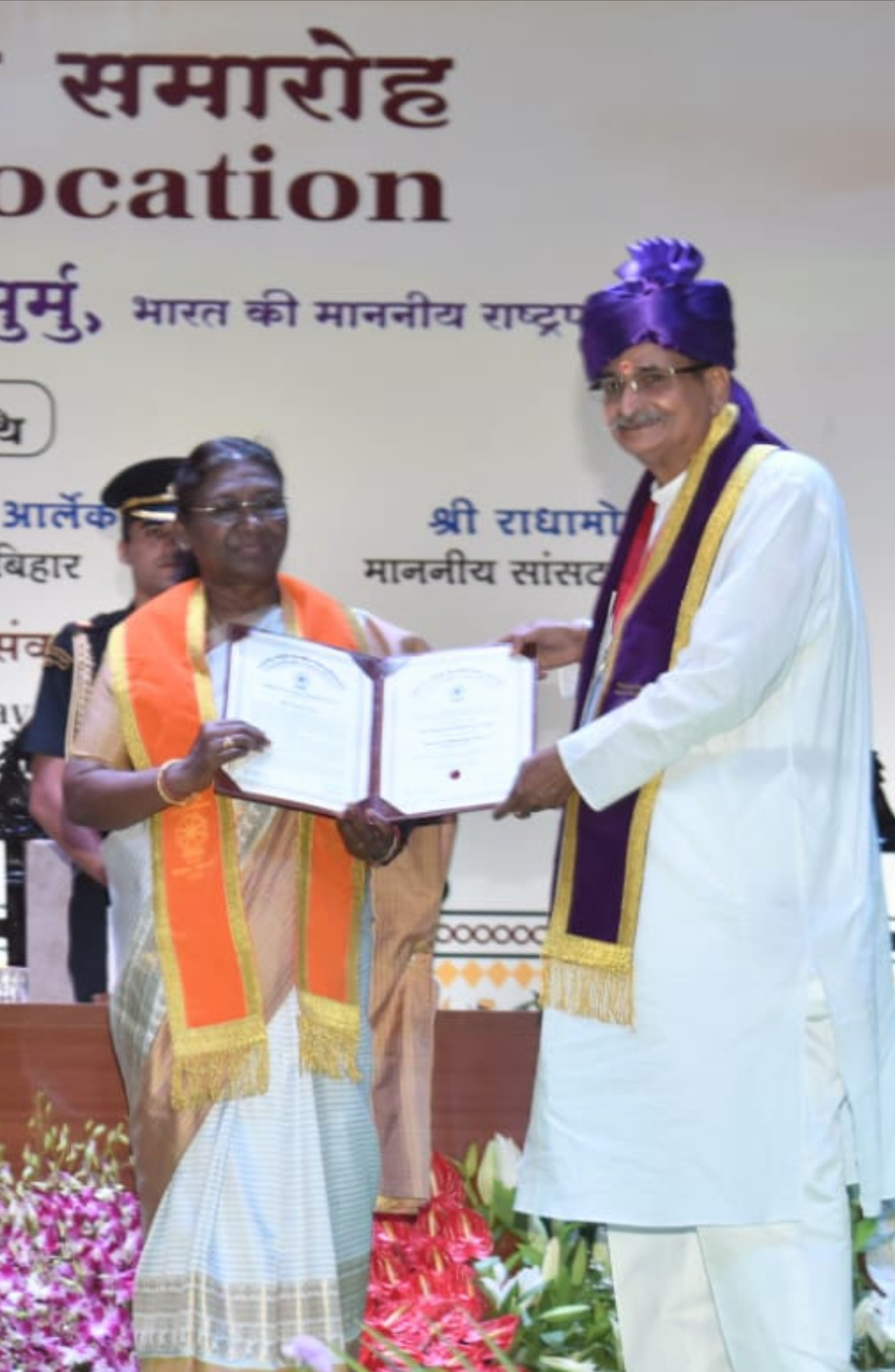
- Sinha (right) and Droupadi Murmu (left) in an undated photo

Member of Parliament, Rajya Sabha
- In office 10 April 2014 – 9 April 2020
- Succeeded by: Amarendra Dhari Singh
- Constituency: Bihar

Personal details
- Born: 22 September 1951 Buxar, Bihar, India
- Died: 30 October 2026 (aged 75) Noida, Uttar Pradesh, India
- Party: BJP
- Spouse: Shrimati Rita Kishore Sinha
- Children: 2 Rituraj Kishore Sinha / Revoli Sinha
- Profession: Rajya Sabha, otherwise retired
- Website: www.rksinha.com
- As of 20 December, 2016

Ravindra Kishore Sinha (22 September 1951 – 30 October 2026) was an Indian billionaire businessman, politician, philanthropist and journalist. He was the founder of Security and Intelligence Services, a private security provider in India and Australia.

== Life and career ==
Sinha was a graduate of Political Science and Law and started his career as a journalist. He created Security and Intelligence Services to help retired servicemen after the Indo-Pakistani War of 1971.

He was elected to the Rajya Sabha to represent Bihar State by the Bhartiya Janata Party (BJP) as a Member of Parliament in the Indian Upper House in 2014.

In November 2017, an investigation conducted by the International Consortium of Investigative Journalism cited his name in the list of politicians named in "Paradise Papers" where he was found to be clean chit and with no legal issues. This reference did not appear to contain anything other than legal dealings.

As of March 2018, his net worth was estimated at US$1.0 billion.

Sinha died on 30 October 2026, at the age of 75.
