= John B. Chitamber =

John Benedict Chitambar
- Born: 16 August 1920; Lucknow, India
- Died: 8 September 2005 (aged 85); Sacramento, California, U.S.
- Education: Cornell University; University of Allahabad
- Scientific career
- Fields: Rural Sociology; Continuing education
- Workplaces: Allahabad Agricultural Institute; World Vision International

John Benedict Chitambar (16 August 1920 – 8 September 2005) was an Indian educator at the Allahabad Agricultural Institute.

== Early life and background ==
Chitambar was born in Lucknow, India. He received his doctorate in rural sociology from Cornell University.

== Career ==
After the independence of India, he moved to the Allahabad Agricultural Institute, where he served for 31 years, initially in the Department of Extension and then as principal until 1980.

He relocated to the United States in 1981, where he worked with World Vision International for 10 years as a director of rural development and agriculture. He published numerous papers and three textbooks in his field of rural sociology.

== Books published ==
- Introductory Rural Sociology (ISBN 8122409717)
- Practical Rural Sociology Handbook for Application to Rural Development (ISBN 8122413102)
- Introductory to Rural Sociology A Synopsis of Concepts and Principles (ISBN 8122409717)
