= Sam Higginbottom =

British missionary (1874–1958)

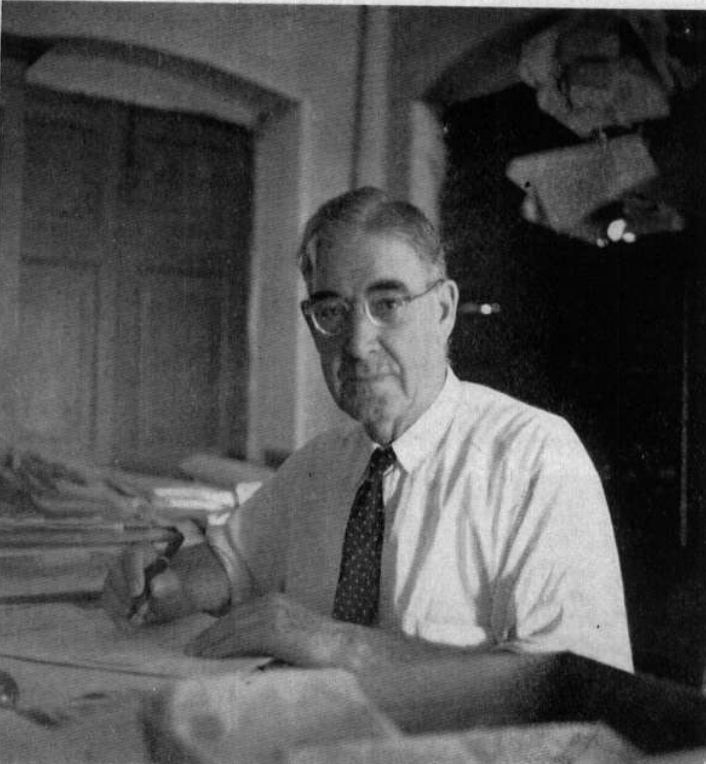
- Born: 27 October 1874; Manchester, England
- Died: 11 July 1958 (aged 83); Frostproof, Florida, U.S.
- Education: Princeton University; Ohio State University
- Spouse: Jane Ethelind Cody
- Scientific career
- Fields: Agricultural economics Rural sociology
- Workplaces: Ewing Christian College; Allahabad Agricultural Institute

Samuel Higginbottom (27 October 1874 – 11 June 1958) was an English-born Christian missionary in Allahabad (now Prayagraj), India, where he founded the Allahabad Agricultural Institute. Higginbottom was born in Manchester, England.

== Early life ==
Higginbottom was born in Manchester, England in 1874, his mother being Welsh and his father, English. When he was a child, the family moved to Ty'n-y-Groes and then Llandudno in North Wales. His Welsh-speaking mother attended the Rehoboth Welsh Calvinistic Methodist chapel in Llandudno, while Sam was brought up the English-speaking Presbyterian Church of Wales. It was here he became a communicant under the ministry of Revd C.T. Astley.

Sam left school early and working at different times as a butcher's boy, cab driver, and milk deliverer. However, he had a strong youthful interest in the Christian gospel, and resolved to become a preacher or missionary.

Higginbottom left Llandudno aged twenty for the United States of America. He attended Mount Hermon School in Massachusetts from 1894 to 1899. He continued his education at Amherst College and Princeton University in the United States, receiving a bachelor's degree from Princeton in 1903.

== Work in India ==
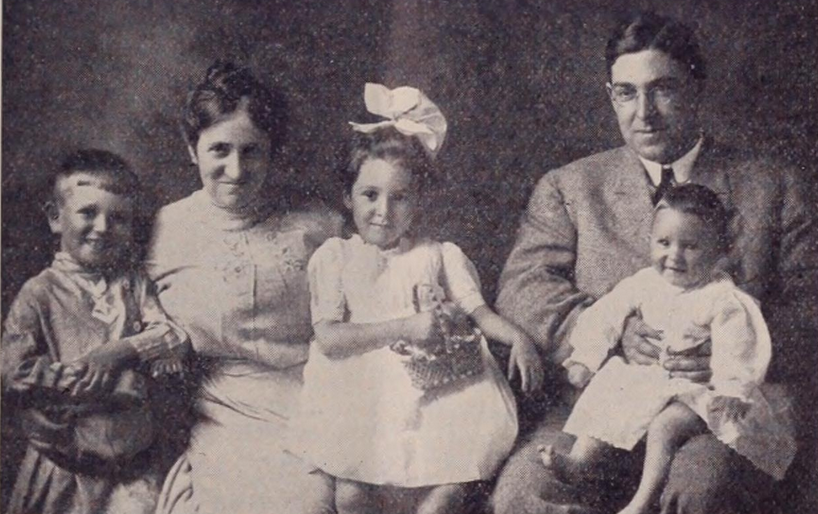
Sam Higginbottom with his wife and three children, from a 1914 publication

On the recommendation of Henry Forman, Higginbottom arrived in India in 1903 as part of the North India Mission of the Presbyterian Church. From then until 1909 he taught economics and science in Allahabad Christian College (now Ewing Christian College). In 1904 he married Jane Ethelind Cody, of Cleveland, Ohio, who joined him in his work. They had five children together.

In 1909, he returned to the United States and spent three years studying agriculture at Ohio State University, after which he went back to Allahabad, to teach scientific methods of farming. His educational programs grew into the founding of Allahabad Agricultural Institute in 1919. In 2009, Allahabad Agricultural Institute was rechristened as Sam Higginbottom University of Agriculture, Technology and Sciences (SHUATS) in honour of the founder.

Higginbottom wrote two books: a book about his work published in 1921 and an autobiography published in 1949. While in India, he developed close friendships with Mahatma Gandhi and Jawaharlal Nehru. He retired in Florida in 1945. Higginbottom died in Frostproof, Florida at the home of his daughter, Mrs. Charles Coates.

== Collections ==
Higginbottom's papers are housed at the Albert and Shirley Small Special Collections Library at the University of Virginia.

== Bibliography ==
- Sam Higginbottom. The Gospel and the Plough, Or, The Old Gospel and Modern Farming in Ancient India. 1921. London: Central Board of Missions and Society for Promoting Christian Knowledge. Republished in 2006: ISBN 1-4254-8665-7
- Sam Higginbottom. Sam Higginbottom, Farmer: An Autobiography. 1949. Republished in 2007: ISBN 978-0-548-44200-5
