= Terence Gavaghan =

Colonial District Officer in Kenya

Terence Gavaghan MBE

District Officer in Charge of Rehabilitation of Kenya Colony
- In office April 1957 – March 1958

Personal details
- Born: 1 October 1922 Allahabad, British India
- Died: 10 August 2011 (aged 88) United Kingdom

Terence Gavaghan MBE (1 October 1922 – 10 August 2011) was a British colonial administrator. As a colonial district officer in Kenya, he was responsible for six detention centres in Mwea during the Mau Mau insurrection of the 1950s.

Responsible for the widespread implementation of torture against Kenyan detainees during the insurrection, Gavaghan was identified by detention camp prisoner Espon Makanga as one of three colonial officers who developed the 'dilution technique' and also killed Kenyans: "They beat us from the day we arrived, with sticks, with their fists, kicking us with their boots. They beat us to make us work. They beat us to force us to confess our Mau Mau oath. After a year I couldn't take it any longer. Gavaghan had won."

== Early life ==
Terence Gavaghan was born on 1 October 1922 in Allahabad, India. His father was the Comptroller General of the Indian Civil Service. He died in Terence's youth. Gavaghan was of Irish descent.

== Career ==
Gavaghan was in charge at Mwea, when Mwea was very bad. That was when detainees were being hung up from the roof of a building, while naked, and cold water would be poured onto his naked body and then he would be whipped...Mwea was a terrible place during that man's time. He...[was] very cruel to the detainees.

— Testimony from a former detainee at Mwea

Gavaghan joined the British colonial administration in Kenya in 1944. In the 1950s the Mau Mau Uprising broke out in Kenya against British colonial rule. In April 1957 Gavaghan, then serving as District Officer of Nyeri, was appointed to the new post of District Officer in Charge of Rehabilitation by Special Commissioner Carruthers Johnston. Unlike other district officers, who reported to Commissioner of Community Development Tom Askwith, Gavaghan answered directly to Johnston. Gavaghan was tasked with the speedy rehabilitation of 30,000 prisoners in the Pipeline, a collection of British internment camps for suspected Mau Mau fighters. Gavaghan was selected due to his reputation as an outsider as a result of being ethnically Irish, as well as other officers who found themselves off-put by his "renegade mentality and insatiable sexual appetite." That month he took control over the detention camps in Mwea and initiated Operation Progress, designed to break prisoner morale and ensure that the fighters confessed and recanted their support for rebellion through the use of force. Gavaghan had disdain for securing voluntary confessions through winning over the "hearts and minds" of the prisoners, later saying, "I think honestly if people said 'hearts and minds' to me I simply said yuck." Once order was restored there, Gavaghan implemented the "dilution technique", whereby small groups of prisoners from Manyani were brought to Mwea and, through the use of physical force, were changed into new prison uniforms and had their heads shaved. Gavaghan's staff and other teams of administrators then forced the Mau Mau to denounce their allegiance to the rebellion. Most confessions were involuntary. Gavaghan was personally involved in the violent treatment of prisoners, and once recalled in an interview that later in his tenure at the camps he personally reviewed recalcitrant detainees and selected some among them to be executed.

Unlike most other attempts at dilution, Gavaghan's implementation was marked by the harsh use of physical force, and the colonial government, led by Governor Evelyn Baring, concluded that this was the best method to deal with the prisoners. Within a few months, the colonial government had convinced the British government to authorise the use of "compelling force" in the Pipeline. As result of his violent use of the dilution technique, Gavaghan gained notoriety among the prisoners. Askwith frequently criticised Gavaghan's violent methods and the use of dilution, though he was soon relieved of his responsibilities regarding prisoner rehabilitation. Gavaghan's methods enabled him to process 200 new prisoners a week at the five Mwea camps. By June the colonial government had re-organised the Pipeline with a new focus on dilution, thus increasing the number or prisoners it was able to process and release. The Mwea camps, under Gavaghan's authority, remained the primary site for use of the technique. Within a year after taking office, Gavaghan was able to successfully process and release half of the Pipeline's prisoners. Baring and the Colonial Secretary praised his work, and in March 1958 Johnston, deeming the situation in the camps under control, relieved Gavaghan of his duties as District Officer in Charge of Rehabilitation. He was then appointed District Officer of Kiambu. He was thus no longer responsible for prisoners, but in June he was tasked with rehabilitating 120 female detainees, as Baring was convinced that only he could force them to co-operate with the colonial authorities.

In 1960 Gavaghan was appointed Localization and Training Officer in Kenya and tasked with Africanizing the senior levels of the civil service in preparation for independence. There were 10,000 senior civil servants in the colony and by Gavaghan's account, "only a sprinkling were African". The British government hoped to hand over 3,000 posts to Africans. Gavaghan oversaw the establishment of the Kenya Institute of Administration to train candidates and by Kenyan independence in December 1963, over one third of all senior civil servants were African. His service in Kenya ended that year. From 1966 to 1973 he served as a consultant for UN agencies and non-governmental organisations.

== Later life ==
Over time Gavaghan's actions during the Mau Mau Uprising became subject to a significant amount of writing, and observers frequently singled him out as an important figure in the event and used him as a representation of a brutal colonist. In 1999 he published a memoir on his service in the colonial administration in Kenya, entitled Of Lions and Dung Beetles. In 2002, Gavaghan was interviewed in the documentary Kenya: White Terror. He denied having personally placed his boot on the necks of any prisoners, but refused to answer when the interviewer asked if he had ordered those under his command to do so, merely staring at him instead. Gavaghan also denied he had been responsible for any deaths, claiming "not one in 20,000" had died under his administration, and said he felt no guilt for his actions.

In his later life he became afflicted by Alzheimer's disease. He died on 10 August 2011.

== Works cited ==
- Anderson, David M. (2014). "Counter-insurgency and decolonization in Kenya, 1952–1963". In Johnson, Robert; Clack, Timothy (eds.). At the End of Military Intervention: Historical, Theoretical and Applied Approaches to Transition, Handover and Withdrawal. OUP Oxford. ISBN 9780191038105.
- Elkins, Caroline Macy (2001). Detention and rehabilitation during the Mau Mau Emergency: The crisis of late colonial Kenya (PhD thesis). Harvard University. OCLC 77071517.
- Hasian, Marouf; Muller, Marek S. (2016). "Post-conflict peace initiatives, British Mau Mau compensation, and the mastering of colonial pasts". Journal of Multicultural Discourses. 11 (2): 164–180. doi:10.1080/17447143.2016.1182535. S2CID 147811009.
- Imperato, Pascal James (September 2000). "Terence Gavaghan. Of Lions and Dung Beetles: A "Man in the Middle" of Colonial Administration in Kenya". African Studies Review. 43 (2): 175–177. doi:10.2307/525013. JSTOR 525013. S2CID 221537404.
