= Raj Narain Kapoor =

Indian professor of mechanical engineering

Professor R.N. Kapoor was born in 1931 at Allahabad, India. He graduated with Honors in Mechanical Engineering. Throughout his professional career he did exemplary works in the field of technical education, appropriate technologies, integrated rural development, women empowerment and gerontology in India. Currently he has been involved in promoting Holistic health treatment therapies in United States of America.

== Contributions to the field of education ==
He was instrumental in developing the Civil Engineering School in Allahabad U.P. from hutments in 1955 to an internationally acclaimed Institute of Engineering and Rural Technology, Allahabad (IERT) and also established the Girl's Polytechnic and Ishwar Saran Degree College at Allahabad. He was the first non IAS Director of Technical Education U.P. appointed in 1974 and developed several polytechnics and colleges in U.P. and also promoted technological institutes in Iraq as well. He initiated the community development movement through technical institutions in 1975 and spread it over different parts of India and got it adopted by the Govt of India as the Community Polytechnic movement and also established a centre in Flensburg Germany. In 1976 he founded the Allahabad Rural Development Society as well as Allahabad Gram Swaraj Samiti (Society for Rural Self Governance) in tribal belt. After taking voluntary retirement from IERT, he still continues to be associated with rural societies founded by him. He co-authored the first book on Critical Path Method and PERT with Dr Merle D Schmidt Professor Emeritus Industrial Engineering, University of Dayton in 1966-67 published in India. In 1968 he was invited by the National Science Foundation and US International Development Agency to visit and lecture in 22 universities all across USA. He pioneered several activities in renewable sources of energy like solar, windmills, biogas plants and helped establish their research centers in Allahabad. Mr. Kapoor has also been a member of Himachal Pradesh Planning Commission and has served on the Board of Governors of IIT Kanpur, TTI Bhopal and several other Technical colleges/Universities and State Councils of Science and Technology of different states in India.He was the founder Chairman of All India Board of Vocational Education (MHRD )

Deen Dayal Research Institute

In 1986 he got associated with Maharishi Mahesh Yogi and worked as the honorary Trustee of Maharishi International Foundation. Subsequently, he got closely associated with Padma Vibhushan Nanaji Deshmukh, great social activist, and stayed with him for 8 yrs and also worked as Secretary-General and later on as Vice Chairman of Deen Dayal Research Institute. Due to his continued passion for Rural Development, he shifted to Chitrakoot in 1989, where he developed Mahatma Gandhi Rural University as its founder Vice-chancellor, on 600 acres of land and established 80 departments within a record time of three years. In Chitrakoot, he also founded the branch of Deen Dayal Research Institute and its watershed development projects. He developed Krishi Vigyan Kendras in three districts of UP for Agriculture Research and Development. In 1996 . He established the Central Chinmaya Vanprasth Sansthan at Allahabad of which he was the founder Director General and now its Patron. He had been instrumental in establishing several Centers of Development of Rural Technologies in India.

== Social work ==
He pioneered several activities in renewable sources of energy like solar, windmills, biogas plants and their research centers were also established by him in Allahabad. He established 80 departments including an Engineering College and Post Graduate Faculty and hospital of Ayurveda in Chitrakoot. In 2008 he started the Indian Society of U3A (Universities of Third Age) in India and organized its first ever World U3A conference in India at Chitrakoot in February 2010 in which more than 22 countries and 1000 delegates effectively participated. He is currently involved in Holistic Health Care Development Projects in the USA.
