= Nalin Mazumdar =

Indian musician

Sri Nalin Mazumdar can safely be called a guru or ustaad of the Hawaiian Guitar, also known as the Slide Guitar. Born and brought up in the holy city of Allahabad, Nalinji made untiring efforts towards the teaching and recognition of the Slide Guitar during 1940. He has studied with Acharya Allauddin Khan and also from Late Dr. Ali Akbar Khan during 1930s

It was through his efforts that the Indian slide guitar or Classical Guitar was finally introduced in the syllabus of the Prayag Sangeet Samiti as an instrument. Nalinji never sought glory or limelight and continued to teach students in his humble home at Tagoretown in Allahabad till his last breath.

As far as the Adaptation of Hawaiian Guitar into Hindustani Classical Music is concerned, the credit goes to him. Sri Nalin Mazumdar, for the first time, played Hindustani Classical Music on Hawaiian Guitar about 60 years back. It was really a difficult task for him, and he had to face lot of problems before the audience who were not at all interested to listen classical music on Hawaiian Guitar. He tried his level best to popularize Hindustani classical music on this instrument. Nalinji was the guru of Dr. Shivanath Bhattacharya of Varanasi and the disciple of Late Baba Allauddin Khan Saheb (of Maihar Gharana). Nalin Mazumdar's youngest brother Late shri Dulal Mazumdar was also well known Hawaiian Guitarist. His nephew Pt. Gaurav Mazumdar is a celebrated Sitarist.

Sri Nalin Mazumdar is survived by four children, June Ghosh Hazra, Ina Ghosh, Orjun Mazumdar and Anjan Mazumdar.
