= Marehra =

Marehra Marahra
- Municipality
- Location in Uttar Pradesh, India
- Coordinates: 27°45′N 78°34′E
- Country: India
- State: Uttar Pradesh
- District: Etah

Population (2011)
  - Total: 19,542

Languages
  - Official: Hindi
- Time zone: UTC+5:30 (IST)
- PIN: 207401

Marehra, (or Marehra Sharif) is a city and a municipal board in Etah district in the state of Uttar Pradesh, India. Marehra is known for Khankah-e-Barkatiya Dargah. Marehra is also known as the Indian Capital of Sunni Muslims; thousands of devotees gather in Marehra annually for the festival of Urs.

== Geography ==
Marehra is located at coordinates 27.45°N 78.34°E, 21.5 kilometres (13 mi) from the district headquarters Etah, 255 kilometres (158 mi) from the state capital Lucknow and 200 kilometres (124 mi) from the national capital Delhi. Other important cities near Marehra are Kasganj (15 km), Aligarh (60 km) and Agra (100 km).

== Demographics ==
As of 2011 India census, Marehra had a population of 19,542. Males constitute 53% of the population and females 47%. Marehra has an average literacy rate of 51%, lower than the national average of 59.5%; male literacy is 60%, and female literacy is 40%. 15.7% of the population is under 6 years of age. Marehra is a state legislative assembly constituency of Uttar Pradesh. This seat is called 105 Marehra Vidhansabha. Marehra, also known as Marehra Shareef, is a noted pilgrimage site for Sunni Muslims.
