= Yadav (surname) =

Indian surname

यादव
- Romanization: Yadav

Origin
- Language: Sanskrit
- Derivation: Yadava
- Region of origin: India; Nepal

This is a list of notable people using Yadav surname.

== Religion ==
- Swami Ramdev, born Ram Krishna Yadav

== Freedom fighters ==
- Rao Gopal Dev, general in the army of Rao Tula Ram during the Indian rebellion of 1857
- Mahendra Gop, freedom revolutionary

== Academicians ==
- Usha Yadav

== Civil servants and bureaucrats ==
- Vinod Kumar Yadav, Former Chairperson of the Railway Board, First Chief Executive Officer, Railway Board, Indian Railways and the ex-officio Principal Secretary to the Government of India
- Bhupendra Yadav, IPS, former DGP of Rajasthan Police, chairman, Rajasthan Public Service Commission
- Gaurav Yadav, IPS, DGP of Punjab Police
- Jagmohan Yadav, IPS, Former DGP of Uttar Pradesh Police
- Manoj Yadava, IPS, DG/Chief of Railway Protection Force, former DGP of Haryana Police
- Meera Yadav, IFS, 22nd Ambassador of India to the United States
- Dinesh Kumar Yadav, IPS, Inspector General of Police Himachal Pradesh
- Neera Yadav, IAS, Former Chief Secretary Of Uttar Pradesh
- Pranjal Yadav, IAS
- Surendra Singh Yadav, IPS, DGP of Chandigarh Police, Former DGP of Andaman and Nicobar Police
- V.S. Yadav, IPS, DGP of Tripura Police
- Sanjeev Kumar Yadav, IPS, most decorated Police officer

== Law ==
- Sanjay Yadav, former Chief Justice of Allahabad High Court
- Shekhar Kumar Yadav
- Surendra Kumar Yadav

== Film and television ==
- Elvish Yadav
- Baba Yadav
- Dinesh Lal Yadav
- Khesari Lal Yadav
- Leena Yadav
- Manisha Yadav
- Narsing Yadav
- Neha Yadav
- Parul Yadav
- Pragya Yadav
- Rajkummar Rao
- Rajesh Yadav
- Raghubir Yadav
- Rajpal Yadav
- Ravi Yadav
- Shrikant Yadav
- Shyam Yadav

== Folk singers ==
- Hiralal Yadav
- Baleshwar Yadav
- Bihari Lal Yadav, father of folk genre Birha, invented Khartal Instrument which is used in Folk songs

== First in their fields ==
- Santosh Yadav, first woman to climb Mount Everest twice, and the first woman to successfully climb Mt. Everest from Kangshung Face
- Dr.Raj Vir Singh Yadav, performed the first kidney transplant in India at the Post Graduate Institute of Medical Education & Research at Chandigarh in 1973
- Surekha Yadav, India's first female train driver (Loco Pilot)
- Bhakti Yadav, the first female MBBS from Indore, India
- Ram Baran Yadav, the first president of Nepal
- Vinod Kumar Yadav, First Chief Executive Officer, Railway Board, Indian Railways and the ex-officio Principal Secretary to the Government of India
- Chaudhary Brahm Prakash Yadav, first chief minister of Delhi
- Ram Saroj Yadav, first deputy chief minister of Madhesh Province, Nepal

== Politicians ==
=== Political Party Founders ===
- Yogendra Yadav - Swaraj India
- Mulayam Singh Yadav - Samajwadi Party
- Rao Birender Singh - Vishal Haryana Party
- Lalu Prasad Yadav - Rashtriya Janata Dal

=== Chief Ministers ===
| Photo | Name | State |
|---|---|---|
| | Bindheshwari Prasad Mandal | Bihar |
| | Daroga Prasad Rai | Bihar |
| | Lalu Prasad Yadav | Bihar |
| | Rabri Devi | Bihar |
| | Rao Birender Singh | Haryana |
| | Babulal Gaur | Madhya Pradesh |
| | Mohan Yadav | Madhya Pradesh |
| | Ram Naresh Yadav | Uttar Pradesh |
| | Mulayam Singh Yadav | Uttar Pradesh |
| | Akhilesh Yadav | Uttar Pradesh |
| | Saroj Kumar Yadav | Madhesh Province |
| | Krishna Prasad Yadav | Madhesh Province |
| | Saroj Yadav | Madhesh Province |

=== Ministers, MPs and MLAs ===
- Athai Ram Yadav, former MLA from Handia, Prayagraj
- Akhilesh Yadav, Ex-Chief Minister of Uttar Pradesh
- Ajay Singh Yadav, former Union Minister
- Ajesh Yadav, AAP member for Badli in the Sixth Legislative Assembly of Delhi
- Annapurna Devi Yadav, Union Minister of Women and Child Development
- Anil Kumar Yadav, a politician from Bihar
- Anil Kumar Yadav, Minister of Irrigation(Water Resources) Government of Andhra Pradesh
- Anjan Kumar Yadav, former M.P. for Secunderabad
- Arun Subhashchandra Yadav, former Union Minister
- Baba Ram Adhar Yadav, former MLA from Allahabad North, Prayagraj
- Babulal Gaur Yadav, 16th Chief Minister of Madhya Pradesh(BJP)
- Badulgula Lingaiah Yadav, Member of the Parliament and leader Telangana Rashtra Samithi party
- Balram Yadav, Samajwadi Party leader, UP
- Bhupender Yadav, Union Minister of Environment, Forest and Climate Change
- Bhagabat Behera Yadav, former Cabinet Minister of Government of Odisha
- Brajendra Singh Yadav, BJP leader, Member of Madhya Pradesh Legislative Assembly
- Chandrajit Yadav, former Union Minister Ministry of Mines (India) & Ministry of Steel
- Chandrapal Singh Yadav, MP, Jhansi, SP
- Choudhary Awadh Bihari Yadav, Speaker, Bihar Legislative Assembly
- Chaudhary Harmohan Singh Yadav, SP Politician, Shaurya Chakra awardee
- Darshan Singh Yadav, former Rajya Sabha MP of Uttar Pradesh
- Dinesh Chandra Yadav, former Minister of Bihar and Member of Parliament
- Dinesh Yadav, former member of Bihar Legislative Assembly
- Deo Narayan Yadav, 12th Speaker of Bihar Legislative Assembly
- Devender Yadav, President Delhi Congress Committee, Indian National Congress
- Dharmananda Behera Yadav, former MLA of Choudwar-Cuttack (Odisha)
- Dharmendra Yadav, M.P., Samajwadi Party
- D. P. Yadav, leader of Rashtriya Parivartan Dal
- Gopal Das Yadav, former MLA from Allahabad West, Prayagraj
- Girish Yadav, State Minister, Uttar Pradesh, A BJP Leader
- Hukmdev Narayan Yadav, former Union Minister of State
- Hemchand Yadav, Former Cabinet Minister of Chhattishgarh Government
- Jay Prakash Narayan Yadav, former Union Minister of State for Water Resources
- Jawahar Singh Yadav, former member of Legislative Assembly from Nawabganj, Prayagraj
- Jawahar Yadav (Pandit), former MLA from Jhusi, Prayagraj
- Jokhu Lal Yadav, former MLA from Handia and Pratappur, Prayagraj
- Kailash Nath Singh Yadav, Bahujan Samaj Party, Uttar Pradesh
- Lalita Yadav, Minister of State of Madhya Pradesh Government
- Laxmi Narayan Yadav, M.P., Sagar, Madhya Pradesh
- Mahendra Singh Yadav, Member of Madhya Pradesh Legislative Assembly
- Dr. Mohan Yadav, Chief Minister of Madhya Pradesh
- Madhusudan Yadav, former Lok Sabha MP and Mayor of Rajnandgaon Municipal Corporation
- Manoj Kumar Yadav, MLA of Jharkhand
- Mitrasen Yadav, Communist Party leader
- Mulayam Singh Yadav (Auraiya politician), former Member of Uttar Pradesh Legislative Council (MLC) for 3 times(he is not the father of Akhilesh Yadav)
- Nagendra Singh Munna Yadav, M.L.A., Samajwadi Party, Pratapgarh, Uttar Pradesh
- Nand Kishore Yadav, Member of the Parliament of India representing Uttar Pradesh in the Rajya Sabha
- Neera Yadav (politician), leader of Bharatiya Janata Party and the minister in government of Jharkhand.
- Om Prakash Yadav JDU, Bihar
- Pappu Yadav, Independent M.P. From Purnia
- Pradeep Yadav, 13th Lok Sabha MP and MLA of Jharkhand state
- Ram Harakh Yadav, Former Member of Parliament from Azamgarh (Lok Sabha constituency)
- Ramakant Yadav, Former Member of Parliament and MLA
- Ram Krishna Yadav, former Member of Parliament from Azamgarh (Lok Sabha constituency)
- Ramesh Prasad Yadav, former Member of Bihar Legislative Assembly
- Rampal Yadav, SP leader
- Ram Gopal Yadav, Rajya Sabha member
- Ram Kripal Yadav, former Union Minister of State
- Ram Lakhan Singh Yadav, former member of Lok Sabha and Ex-MLA of Bihar
- Ram Naresh Yadav, former Chief Minister of Uttar Pradesh, Former Governor of Madhya Pradesh, Former Governor of Chhattisgarh
- Ranjan Prasad Yadav, RJD politician, Bihar
- Rekha Yadav, Bharatiya Janshakti Party Malhara (Vidhan Sabha constituency) in Chhatarpur district, Madhya Pradesh
- Roop Nath Singh Yadav, politician and freedom fighter
- Sadhu Yadav, politician, Bihar
- Sharad Yadav, leader of Janata Dal (U)
- Shivpal Singh Yadav, former Cabinat Minister of Uttar Pradesh
- Shyamlal Yadav, Leader of Congress (I), Former Deputy Chairman of the Rajya Sabha
- Subhash Yadav, former Deputy Chief Minister of Madhya Pradesh
- Subhash Prasad Yadav, former Member of Parliament (Rajya Sabha) from Bihar
- Sudha Yadav, BJP leader
- Sunil Kumar Singh Yadav, Bahujan Samaj Party, Uttar Pradesh
- Surendra Prasad Yadav, former Industrial Minister of Bihar & Jharkhand and Ex-MLA of Bihar he also served as an MP of 12th Lok Sabha
- Talasani Srinivas Yadav, Minister of State in Government of Telangana(Telangana Rashtra Samithi)
- Tejashwi Yadav, Deputy Chief Minister of Bihar State
- Tej Pratap Yadav, Ex-Minister for Health, Bihar
- Tej Pratap Singh Yadav, M.P. for Mainpuri
- Umakant Yadav, former MP from Macchlishahr
- Uma Kant Yadav, Bihar Legislative Assembly
- Umlesh Yadav, former MLA for Bisauli Uttar Pradesh
- Vijama Yadav, MLA, Pratappur, Prayagraj
- Vijay Bahadur Yadav, MLA, Gorakhpur Rural

== Literature ==
- Anand Yadav, a Marathi-language writer
- Kulpreet Yadav, Indian author and actor
- Lalai Singh Yadav, writer and playwright from UP
- Rajendra Yadav, a pioneer of the Hindi literary movement known as Nayi Kahani
- Ramashankar Yadav, Hindi poet
- K. C. Yadav (1936–2021), Indian historian

== Military ==
- Captain Yogendra Singh Yadav, Param Veer Chakra
- Commodore Babru Bhan Yadav, Maha Vir Chakra, Leading Indian Navy officer In Operation Trident operation that attacked Karachi, Pakistan in the Indo-Pakistani War of 1971
- Petty officer Chiman Singh Yadav, Maha Vir Chakra, Operation Cactus Lily, Indo-Pakistan War of 1971
- Brigadier Rai Singh Yadav, Maha Vir Chakra, Tiger of Nathu La, Hero of Nathu La and Cho La clashes
- Parachute Commando Kaushal Yadav, Vir Chakra
- Kulbhushan Yadav, Indian Navy officer
- Corporal Jyoti Prakash Nirala, Ashoka Chakra
- Commando Suresh Chand Yadav, Ashoka Chakra, Operation Vajra Shakti
- Sujjan Singh (soldier), Ashoka Chakra
- Captain Umrao Singh, Victoria Cross recipient in Second World War
- Lt. Gen. J.B.S. Yadava, former Deputy Chief of the Army Staff
- Air Marshal A.K.Bharti, Deputy Chief of Air Staff

== Nepali politics ==
- Bijay Kumar Yadav
- Bodhmaya Kumari Yadav, Member of Parliament
- Chitra Lekha Yadav, former minister for Education
- Dinesh Chandra Yadav (Nepal) member of the Second Nepalese Constituent Assembly
- Ganga Prasad Yadav, Governor of Sudurpashchim Province
- Gita Kumari Yadav
- K.P. Yadav, Chief Minister of Madhesh Province
- Mahendra Yadav, former Union Minister for Water Supply, Leader of Nepali Congress
- Mina Yadav, Member of Parliament, Leader of CPN Maoist (Centere)
- Mukta Kumari Yadav, Member of Parliament
- Omprakash Yadav
- Pradeep Yadav, Union Minister for Forests and Environment
- Ram Saroj Yadav, first Deputy Chief Minister of Madhesh Province
- Radhe Chandra Yadav, member of the Second Nepalese Constituent Assembly
- Ram Ayodhya Prasad Yadav, member of the Second Nepalese Constituent Assembly
- Ram Sahaya Yadav, Vice President of Nepall
- Dr. Ram Baran Yadav, First President of Nepal
- Rekha Yadav Thapa, Member of Parliament
- Renu Kumari Yadav, Minister of Education. member of the Madhesi Janadhikar Forum
- Matrika Yadav, Ministry of Industry, Commerce and Supplies, A Nepal Communist Party Leader
- Saroj Kumar Yadav, Chief Minister of Madhesh Province
- Sita Devi Yadav, Member of Parliament, National Treasurer of Nepali Congress
- Upendra Yadav, Deputy Prime Minister of Nepal, chairperson, People's Socialist Party, Nepal (2020), Federal Socialist Forum, Nepal House Leader in Pratinidhi Sabha, Former External Affairs Minister of Nepal Government

== Professionals ==
- Bhakti Yadav, Padma Shri awardee gynaecologist
- Goriparthi Narasimha Raju Yadav, Leading Agriculturist, Padma Shri Awardee
- Raj Vir Singh Yadav, Kidney transplant surgeon, Padma Shri Awardee, 1982
- Rahul Yadav, Ex CEO, Housing.com and founder of Intelligent Interfaces for e-commerce

== Science and technology ==
- Jhillu Singh Yadav
- Rajpal Singh Yadav

== Social workers ==
- Phoolbasan Bai Yadav Social Worker in Chhattisgarh, Padma Shri Awardee, Godfrey Phillips National Bravery Awardee
- Kunwar Bai Yadav

== Sports ==
- Virender Singh Yadav, wrestling
- Abhishek Yadav, football
- Abhishek Yadav, table-tennis
- Ajay Yadav, cricket
- Ajeet Singh Yadav, Silver Medalist in 2024 Summer Paralympics
- Akash Yadav, cricket
- Amit Raj Kumar Yadav, cricket
- Arjun Yadav, cricket
- Ashwin Yadav, cricket
- Avinash Yadav, cricket
- Bani Yadav, car rallyist, India's fastest women car racer
- Chinki Yadav, Indian sport shooter
- Dharmendra Singh Yadav, boxing
- Guru Hanuman aka Vijay Pal Yadav, wrestling coach
- Hemulal Yadav, cricket
- Jai Prakash Yadav, cricket
- Jayant Yadav, cricket
- Jyoti Yadav, cricket
- Kapil Yadav, cricket
- Kavita Yadav, air-rifle shooting
- Krishnappa Gowtham, cricket
- Kuldeep Yadav, cricket
- Kuldip Yadav, cricket
- Lalit Yadav, Delhi cricketer
- Lalit Yadav, Vidharbha cricketer
- Laxmi Yadav, cricketer in the WPL
- Mayank Yadav, cricket
- Narsingh Pancham Yadav, wrestling
- Poonam Yadav, cricket
- Punam Yadav, weightlifting
- Puneet Yadav, cricket
- Radha Yadav, cricket
- Rahul Yadav (cricketer)
- Rakesh Kumar Yadav (athlete), athletics
- Ram Singh Sanjay Yadav, cricket
- Ram Singh Yadav, marathon runner
- Renuka Yadav, hockey
- Sandeep Tulsi Yadav, wrestling
- Sanjay Yadav, cricket
- Sanju Yadav, footballer
- Santosh Yadav (cricketer), cricket
- Santosh Yadav, mountaineering
- Satish Kumar Yadav, boxing
- Sat Prakash Yadav, basketball
- Shivlal Yadav, cricket
- Sonam Yadav, cricketer in the WPL
- Suryakumar Yadav, cricket
- Swapnali Yadav, swimming
- Umesh Yadav, cricket
- Vidhya Yadav, cricket administration
- Vijay Yadav, cricket
- Vikas Krishan Yadav, boxing
- Vishal Yadav, cricket

== Criminals ==
- Chavviram Singh Yadav, bandit
- Kalua, dacoit
- Akku Yadav gangster and serial rapist

== Vice Chancellors ==
- G. D. Yadav, vice-chancellor of Institute of Chemical Technology, Mumbai (erstwhile UDCT) from 2009 until November 2019
- Ramesh Kumar Yadava, vice chancellor of Baba Mast Nath University, Rohtak, Haryana
- Raja Ram Yadav former vice-chancellor of Veer Bahadur Singh Purvanchal University
- Ramakant Yadav (neurologist), vice-chancellor, Uttar Pradesh University of Medical Sciences
- J. P. Yadav, vice-chancellor, Indira Gandhi University, Rewari, Haryana
