= Atiq Ahmed =

Indian criminal (1962–2023)

Member of Parliament, Lok Sabha
- In office 13 May 2004 – 16 May 2009
- Preceded by: Dharmraj Patel
- Succeeded by: Kapil Muni Karwariya
- Constituency: Phulpur

Member of Uttar Pradesh Legislative Assembly
- In office 1 December 1989 – 13 May 2004
- Preceded by: Gopal Das Yadav
- Succeeded by: Raju Pal
- Constituency: Allahabad West

President of Apna Dal Kamerawadi for Uttar Pradesh
- In office 1999–2003

Personal details
- Born: 10 August 1962 Allahabad, Uttar Pradesh, India (now Prayagraj)
- Died: 15 April 2023 (aged 60) Prayagraj, Uttar Pradesh, India
- Cause of death: Assassination by gunshots
- Party: AIMIM (2021–2023)
- Other political affiliations: Samajwadi Party (1993–1999, 2003–2008, 2014–2021); Apna Dal Kamerawadi (1999–2003, 2008–2014)
- Spouse: Shaista Parveen (m. 1996)
- Relations: Khalid Azim (brother)
- Children: 5
- Occupation: Gangster; politician

Atiq Ahmed (also spelled as Atique Ahmed; 10 August 1962 – 15 April 2023) was a notorious Indian gangster, criminal and politician. He served as a member of the Indian Parliament and the Uttar Pradesh Legislative Assembly from the Samajwadi Party. Ahmed had more than 160 criminal cases registered against him and contested several elections while being imprisoned. As of March 2023, the Uttar Pradesh Police had seized properties worth 1100 crore belonging to Ahmed and his family. In 2019, he was convicted of kidnapping a witness who had testified against him regarding the 2005 murder of his political rival Raju Pal. Ahmed remained in jail until his assassination by three gunmen on his way to a court-mandated medical checkup on 15 April 2023.

== Early and personal life ==
Atiq Ahmed was born in 1962. His father was a horse-cart driver in Allahabad.

Ahmed was married to Shaista Parveen. The couple had five sons Umar (1998), Ali (2002), Asad (2003–2023), Ahzam (2005) and Abaan (2008–2026). Ahmed's brother Khalid Azim alias Ashraf was also an ex-MLA from the Samajwadi Party.

== Political career ==
=== Entry into politics ===
Ahmed entered politics in 1989 when he won a MLA seat in Allahabad West as an independent candidate. He retained his seat in the 1991 and 1993 Uttar Pradesh assembly elections, and then won the seat in 1996 as a Samajwadi Party (SP) member.

=== As a member of Lok Sabha ===
In 1999, he left the SP and became the president of Apna Dal (Kamerawadi), winning the Allahabad West seat in 2002. He rejoined the SP in 2003. In 2004, Ahmed was elected as the Lok Sabha Member of Parliament for Phulpur, after which he resigned from his MLA seat in Allahabad.

In 2007, he was expelled from SP after he provided protection to men with allegations of rape in a madrasa and the massive outcry caused by the event.

In the 2009 Indian general elections, Atiq Ahmed was allowed to run for election, since he was yet to be convicted in any criminal case. However, the Samajwadi Party expelled him in the year 2008 and Mayawati refused him a ticket under Bahujan Samaj Party (BSP). Later, he contested elections as a candidate for the Apna Dal (Kamerawadi) party in Pratapgarh, only to lose the election.

=== Participation from prison ===
Ahmed contested the 2012 Uttar Pradesh elections under the Apna Dal (Kamerawadi) banner for the Allahabad (West) constituency. He filed his nomination from jail. He appealed for bail in the Allahabad High Court, but ten judges recused themselves from hearing his case. The Economic Times and The Times of India reported that the judges' refusals were due to Ahmed's "terror". The eleventh judge released him on bail before the elections, but the election was won by Raju Pal's widow, Puja Pal.

In 2014, he was taken back into the Samajwadi Party and fought the national elections for the Shrawasti constituency. He secured a quarter of the votes but lost by more than 85,000 votes to Daddan Mishra of the Bharatiya Janata Party (BJP).

In 2019, Ahmed contested against Narendra Modi from Varanasi constituency as an independent candidate and secured 833 votes.

== Electoral history ==
=== Uttar Pradesh Legislative Assembly ===
Year	Constituency	Party	Votes	%	Opponent	Party	Votes	%	Margin	Margin in %	Results
1989	Allahabad West	Independent	25,906	33.54	Gopal Das	INC	17,804	23.05	8,102	10.49	Won
1991	Allahabad West	Independent	36,424	51.26	Ram Chandra Jaiswal	BJP	20,681	29.10	15,743	22.16	Won
1993	Allahabad West	Independent	56,914	49.85	Tirath Ram Kohli	BJP	47,597	41.6	9,317	8.16	Won
1996	Allahabad West	SP	73,152	53.98	Tirath Ram Kohli	BJP	38,053	28.08	35,099	25.90	Won
2002	Allahabad West	AD(K)	39,532	36.09	Gopal Das Yadava	SP	27,724	25.31	11,808	10.78	Won
2012	Allahabad West	AD(S)	62,229	35.10	Pooja Pal	BSP	71,114	40.11	-8,885	-5.01	Lost

=== Lok Sabha ===
Year	Constituency	Party	Votes	%	Opponent	Party	Votes	%	Margin	Margin in %	Results
2004	Phulpur	SP	265,432	35.13	Keshari Devi Patel	BSP	201,085	26.62	64,347	8.52	Won
2009	Pratapgarh	AD(K)	1,08,211	16.88	Rajkumari Ratna Singh	INC	169,137	26.39	-60,926	-9.51	Lost
2014	Shrawasti	SP	2,60,051	26.53	Daddan Mishra	BJP	3,45,964	35.30	-85,913	-8.77	Lost
2018 (by-election)	Phulpur	Independent	48,094	6.58	Nagendra Pratap Singh Patel	SP	3,42,922	49.95	-2,94,861	-40.37	Lost
2019	Varanasi	Independent	855	0.08	Narendra Modi	BJP	674,664	63.62	-6,73,809	-63.54	Lost

== Criminal cases ==
=== Introduction to crime ===
Ahmed entered the world of crime by stealing coal from trains and selling it for profit. This later transformed into threatening contractors for obtaining government tenders for railway scrap metal. His first criminal record was in 1979, when he was accused of murder in Prayagraj. He also became the first person to be booked under the Goonda Act in Uttar Pradesh.

In his early days, Ahmed worked closely with other notorious members of the criminal organization in Allahabad namely Chand Baba. After the encounter of his biggest competitor Shaukat Ilahi in 1990, Ahmed became very powerful and became known for extortion, kidnapping and murder.

=== Raju Pal murder ===
In 2004, Atiq Ahmed vacated the Allahabad West MLA seat in order to serve as an MP from Phulpur as a member of SP. In his place, his younger brother Khalid Azim contested the by-elections and lost to a BSP candidate, Raju Pal. In 2005, Raju Pal was shot dead and Khalid Azim was able to win the next by-elections and obtain the MLA seat.

Ahmed was named and arrested as the main accused in this case but later received bail. Ahmed was able to hold his power in the underworld even from inside the prison.

After Mayawati gained power as the Chief Minister of Uttar Pradesh, she mounted pressure against him. He surrendered and was arrested in 2008.

=== SHUATS assault case ===
On 14 December 2016, staff members of Sam Higginbottom University of Agriculture, Technology and Sciences were allegedly assaulted by Ahmed and his associates after two students were caught cheating. The video of Ahmed beating the SHUATS teacher and employees was widely circulated on the internet. Atiq claimed the students had been unfairly targeted. Ahmed was arrested the following day. Ahmed was arrested on 11 February and remanded to 14-day judicial custody.

=== Umesh Pal abduction and murder ===
In 2009, Ahmed was convicted of the kidnapping of Umesh Pal, a key witness who testified against Ahmed in the Raju Pal murder case. On 24 February 2023, Umesh Pal was killed during a shooting and bomb attack. Ahmed was the main suspect accused in this murder case. Ahmed's brother Ashraf, son Asad, and associate Guddu Muslim, a bomb maker who allegedly threw the bomb at Umesh Pal and has been involved in previous violent crimes, were the co-accused. On 13 April 2023, Ahmed's son, Asad, was killed in an encounter in Jhansi by the Uttar Pradesh Police's Special Task Force (STF).

Ahmed was shifted from the Prayagraj Central Jail to the Sabarmati Jail in Gujarat in June 2019.

Within two months of Pal's murder, six accused, including Ahmed, his brother and son were killed.

=== Links to ISI and LeT ===
Days before his death, the Uttar Pradesh Police filed an application before a Prayagraj court that Ahmed had revealed on having links with the Pakistan-based spy agency Inter-Services Intelligence and terrorist outfit Lashkar-e-Taiba, and had used those ties to procure sophisticated weaponry. In his statement, Ahmed stated that he received arms through drones that were dropped by drones at the Punjab border.

== Death ==
On 15 April 2023, while being escorted for a court-mandated medical checkup in police protection in Prayagraj, Ahmed was asked about his absence during his son's last rites, to which he replied, "They didn't take me, so I didn't go." Before Ahmed's brother Ashraf could complete his statement, "The main thing is that Guddu Muslim...", a pistol was fired at Atiq Ahmed's head at point-blank range, and he died on the spot. Ashraf Ahmed was also killed in the attack, which was captured and broadcast live on television. The brothers were surrounded by police personnel at the time of the shooting.

The three perpetrators had posed as media personnel. They were surrounded by police personnel, following which they raised both their hands and yelled “surrender” thrice. They were identified as Lovelesh Tiwari, Sunny Singh, and Arun Maurya, and were arrested. Reporting on the first information report from Uttar Pradesh Police, Times of India reported that "the accused told police they wanted to make a name for themselves and establish their identity in the state by eliminating Ahmed's gang." A Supreme Court bench noted that despite the presence of 5-10 people guarding Ahmed and his brother, they were shot dead, and commented that "someone is complicit".

=== Reactions ===
Samajwadi Party MLA Pooja Pal, whose husband and BSP MLA Raju Pal was killed in 2005 by assailants associated with Ahmed, praised Chief Minister Yogi Adityanath for taking action against Ahmed. Some citizens also expressed approval of the killing, as did several leaders from the Bharatiya Janata Party. Pal's support for Adityanath's crackdown and Ahmed's death led to her expulsion from the Samajwadi Party on the grounds of anti-party activities.

All India Majlis-e-Ittehad-ul-Muslimeen (AIMIM) leader Asaduddin Owaisi criticized those celebrating the murder of Ahmed, describing such reactions as “vulture-like.” Samajwadi Party president Akhilesh Yadav condemned the killing and alleged that it reflected a deterioration of law and order under the Adityanath government.

== In popular media ==
In the 2026 film Dhurandhar: The Revenge, Atiq Ahmed is portrayed by actor Salim Siddiqui as Atif Ahmed. The film depicts Ahmed as a criminal mastermind involved in the trafficking of weapons, narcotics, and counterfeit currency, plus being in cahoots of Pakistan's Inter-Services Intelligence (ISI), leading to significant losses in his illegal operations by 2016 Indian banknote demonetisation.

Ahmed's portrayal in the movie led to a major controversy, with many political parties such as Samajwadi Party calling it an intentionally woven narrative with a political purpose. Many of these political leaders strongly refuted Atiq Ahmad's portrayal in the movie, calling it completely improper and untrue.

== See also ==
- Vohra Report on criminalisation of politics in India
- Mafia Raj
- Rent-seeking
- Mukhtar Ansari
- Vikas Dubey
