= Second Pant ministry (Uttar Pradesh) =

Indian state government (1952–54)

- Ministry of Uttar Pradesh
- Date formed: 1952
- Date dissolved: 1954

People and organisations
- Chief Minister: Govind Ballabh Pant
- Member party: Indian National Congress

History
- Legislature term: 1st Uttar Pradesh Legislative Assembly
- Successor: First Sampurnanand ministry

The Fourth Govind Ballabh Pant ministry is the Council of Ministers in the 1st Uttar Pradesh Legislative Assembly headed by Chief Minister Govind Ballabh Pant from 1952 to 1954.

== Council of ministers ==
Name	Office	Portfolio	Took office	Left office	Party
Govind Ballabh Pant	Chief Minister	General Administration, Planning, Cooperatives	1952	1954	Indian National Congress
Hafiz Mohd Ibrahim	Cabinet minister	Finance, Power	1952	1954	Indian National Congress
Sampurnanand	Cabinet minister	Home, Labour	1952	1954	Indian National Congress
Hukum Singh	Cabinet minister	Industry and relief, Rehabilitation	1952	1954	Indian National Congress
Girdhari Lal	Cabinet minister	Public Works	1952	1954	Indian National Congress
Chandra Bhanu Gupta	Cabinet minister	Civil Supplies, Health	1952	1954	Indian National Congress
Charan Singh	Cabinet minister	Revenue, Agriculture	1952	1954	Indian National Congress
Syed Ali Zahir	Cabinet minister	Law, Excise	1952	1954	Indian National Congress
Hargovind Singh	Cabinet minister	Education, Harijan and Social Welfare	1952	1954	Indian National Congress
Mohanlal Gautam	Cabinet minister	Self-governance	1952	1954	Indian National Congress
Kamalapati Tripathi	Cabinet minister	Information, Irrigation	1952	1954	Indian National Congress
Mangla Prasad	Deputy minister	Parliamentary Affairs, Cooperatives	1952	1954	Indian National Congress
Jagmohan Singh Negi	Deputy minister	Forest	1952	1954	Indian National Congress
Jagan Prasad Rawat	Deputy minister	Agriculture	1952	1954	Indian National Congress
Muzaffar Hasan	Deputy minister	Prison	1952	1954	Indian National Congress
Chaturbhuj Sharma	Deputy minister	Public Works	1952	1954	Indian National Congress
Ram Murti	Deputy minister	Irrigation	1952	1954	Indian National Congress
Phool Singh	Deputy minister	Planning	1952	1954	Indian National Congress
Kripa Shankar	Parliamentary secretary	Attached with Chief Minister	1952	1954	Indian National Congress
Banarsi Das	Parliamentary secretary	Attached With Civil Supplies and Health Minister	1952	1954	Indian National Congress
Baldev Singh Arya	Parliamentary secretary	Attached With Civil Supplies and Health Minister	1952	1954	Indian National Congress
Sita Ram	Parliamentary secretary	Attached With Education Minister	1952	1954	Indian National Congress
Dwarika Prasad Maurya	Parliamentary secretary	Attached With Agriculture and Revenue Minister	1952	1954	Indian National Congress
Mohd Rauf Jafri	Parliamentary secretary	Attached With Industry and relief, Rehabilitation Minister	1952	1954	Indian National Congress

== See also ==
- First Sampurnanand ministry
