= Phulpur Lok Sabha constituency =

Lok Sabha Constituency in Uttar Pradesh, India

Coordinates: 25.55°N 82.09°E

Phulpur UP-51
- Lok Sabha constituency
- Interactive Map Outlining Phulpur Lok Sabha constituency

Constituency details
- Country: India
- Region: North India
- State: Uttar Pradesh
- Assembly constituencies: Phaphamau; Soraon; Phulpur; Allahabad West; Allahabad North
- Established: 1951
- Reservation: None

Member of Parliament
- 18th Lok Sabha
- Incumbent Praveen Patel
- Party: Bharatiya Janata Party
- Elected year: 2024

Phulpur Lok Sabha constituency, also spelled Phoolpur, is one of the 80 Lok Sabha (parliamentary) constituencies in Uttar Pradesh state in northern India. It lies in Prayagraj district. Phulpur is a historic constituency and two Indian Prime Ministers Jawaharlal Nehru and V P Singh have been elected from this constituency. The first Prime Minister of India Jawaharlal Nehru died in office in 1964 while representing this constituency. Hence it is also called "Nehru's constituency".

== Vidhan Sabha segments ==
No	Name	District	Member	Party	2024 Lead
254	Phaphamau	Prayagraj	Guru Prasad Maurya	BJP	SP
255	Soraon (SC)	Prayagraj	Geeta Shastri	SP	SP
256	Phulpur	Prayagraj	Deepak Patel	BJP	SP
261	Allahabad West	Prayagraj	Sidharth Nath Singh	BJP	BJP
262	Allahabad North	Prayagraj	Harshvardhan Bajpai	BJP	BJP

== Members of Parliament ==
Year	Member	Party
1952	Jawaharlal Nehru (Note: 2 member constituency)	Indian National Congress
1952	Masuriya Din	Indian National Congress
1957	Jawaharlal Nehru (Note: 2 member constituency)	Indian National Congress
1957	Masuriya Din	Indian National Congress
1962	Jawaharlal Nehru	Indian National Congress
1964^	Vijaya Lakshmi Pandit	Indian National Congress
1967	Vijaya Lakshmi Pandit	Indian National Congress
1969^	Janeshwar Mishra	Samyukta Socialist Party
1971	Vishwanath Pratap Singh	Indian National Congress
1977	Kamala Bahuguna	Janata Party
1980	B. D. Singh	Janata Party (Secular)
1984	Ram Pujan Patel	Indian National Congress
1989	Ram Pujan Patel	Janata Dal
1991	Ram Pujan Patel	Janata Dal
1996	Jang Bahadur Patel	Samajwadi Party
1998	Jang Bahadur Patel	Samajwadi Party
1999	Dharmraj Patel	Samajwadi Party
2004	Atiq Ahmed	Samajwadi Party
2009	Kapil Muni Karwariya	Bahujan Samaj Party
2014	Keshav Prasad Maurya	Bharatiya Janata Party
2018^	Nagendra Pratap Patel	Samajwadi Party
2019	Keshari Devi Patel	Bharatiya Janata Party
2024	Praveen Patel	Bharatiya Janata Party

^ by poll

== Election results ==
=== General election 2024 ===
2024 Indian general elections: Phulpur
Party	Candidate	Votes	%	±%
BJP	Praveen Patel	452,600	44.60	▼11.08
SP	Amarnath Singh Maurya	448,268	44.17	▲6.07
BSP	Jagannath Pal	82,586	8.14	▲8.14
NOTA	None of the Above	5,460	0.54	▲0.27
Majority		4,332	0.43	▼17.15
Turnout		10,14,824	49.10	▲0.40
BJP hold		Swing		

=== General election 2019 ===
2019 Indian general elections: Phulpur
Party	Candidate	Votes	%	±%
BJP	Keshari Devi Patel	544,701	55.68	+16.87
SP	Pandhari Yadav	3,72,733	38.10	−8.85
INC	Pankaj Patel	32,761	3.35	+0.70
NOTA	None of the Above	7,882	0.81	+0.44
Margin of victory		1,71,968	17.58	+9.44
Turnout		9,79,077	48.70	+11.55
BJP gain from SP		Swing	+8.73	

==== 2018 by-election ====
Bye-election, 2018: Phulpur
Party	Candidate	Votes	%	±%
SP	Nagendra Pratap Singh Patel	3,42,922	46.95	+26.62
BJP	Kaushalendra Singh Patel	2,83,462	38.81	−13.63
IND.	Atiq Ahmed	48,094	6.58	N/A
INC	Manish Mishra	19,353	2.65	−3.40
IND.	Dr. Neeraj	4,276	0.59	+0.36
NOTA	None of the Above	2,724	0.37	−0.51
Margin of victory		59,460	8.14	−23.97
Turnout		7,30,612	37.15	−13.05
SP gain from BJP		Swing	-5.49	

=== General election 2014 ===
2014 Indian general elections: Phulpur
Party	Candidate	Votes	%	±%
BJP	Keshav Prasad Maurya	5,03,564	52.44	+44.32
SP	Dharam Raj Singh Patel	1,95,256	20.33	−7.39
BSP	Kapil Muni Karwariya	1,63,710	17.05	−13.31
INC	Mohammad Kaif	58,127	6.05	−6.20
AAP	Shimala Shri	7,384	0.77	+0.77
NOTA	None of the Above	8,424	0.88	+0.88
Margin of victory		3,08,308	32.11	+29.47
Turnout		9,60,419	50.20	+11.51
BJP gain from BSP		Swing	+22.08	

=== General election 2009 ===
2009 Indian general elections: Phulpur
Party	Candidate	Votes	%	±%
BSP	Kapil Muni Karwariya	1,67,542	30.36	
SP	Shyama Charan Gupta	1,52,964	27.72	
Independent	Dr. Sone Lal Patel	76,699	13.90	
INC	Dharmaraj Singh Patel	67,623	12.25	
BJP	Karan Singh Patel	44,828	8.12	
Majority		14,578	2.64	
Turnout		5,51,917	38.69	
BSP gain from SP		Swing		

=== General election 2004 ===
2004 Indian general elections: Phulpur
Party	Candidate	Votes	%	±%
SP	Atique Ahamad	265,432	35.13	
BSP	Keshari Devi Patel	201,085	26.62	
BJP	Beni Madhav Bind	151,509	20.06	
AD(K)	Sone Lal Patel	80,388	10.64	
INC	Ram Pujan Patel	11,367	1.50	
Majority		64,347	8.52	
Turnout		755,222		
SP hold		Swing		

=== General election 1999 ===
1999 Indian general elections: Phulpur
Party	Candidate	Votes	%	±%
SP	Dharmaraj Singh Patel	183282	26.95	
BJP	Beni Madhav Bind	163243	24.01	
BSP	Tulasi Ram Yadav	150173	22.08	
AD(K)	Sone Lal Patel	127780	18.79	
INC	Ram Pujan Patel	32376	4.76	
Majority		20030	2.94	
Turnout		680072	58.38	
SP hold		Swing		

=== General election 1998 ===
1998 Indian general election: Phulpur
Party	Candidate	Votes	%	±%
SP	Jang Bahadur Singh Patel	216124	32.17	
BJP	Beni Madhav Bind	201604	30.01	
BSP	Ram Pujan Patel	177556	26.43	
AD(K)	Sone Lal Patel	42152	6.27	
INC	Jagdish Narain Mishra	19382	2.89	
Majority		14520	2.16	
Turnout		671810	57.61	
SP hold		Swing		

=== General election 1996 ===
1996 Indian general election: Phulpur
Party	Candidate	Votes	%	±%
SP	Jang Bahadur Singh Patel	162844	29.41	
BSP	Kanshi Ram	146823	26.51	
BJP	B.D.Singh	119318	21.55	
INC	Ram Pujan Patel	67714	12.23	
AIIC(T)	Shyam Surat Upadhyay	15304	2.76	
Majority		16021	2.9	
Turnout		553784	47.9	
SP gain from JD		Swing		

=== General election 1991 ===
1991 Indian general election: Phulpur
Party	Candidate	Votes	%	±%
JD	Ram Pujan Patel	150640	34.02	
BSP	Beni Madhav Bind	91039	20.56	
BJP	Deoraj Singh	84449	19.08	
JP	Nisar Ahmed	64484	15.01	
INC	Roop Nath Singh Yadav	27097	6.12	
Majority		59601	13.46	
Turnout		442831	47.8	
JD hold		Swing		

=== General election 1989 ===
1989 Indian general election: Phulpur
Party	Candidate	Votes	%	±%
JD	Ram Pujan Patel	198266	39.84	
INC	Chandrajit Yadav	165765	33.31	
BSP	Beni Madhav Bind	115521	23.22	
Independent	Tulsi Ram Saroj	3756	0.75	
Doordarshi Party	Sriram Jaiswal	3066	0.62	
Majority		32501	6.53	
Turnout		497607	54.39	
JD gain from INC		Swing		

==== 1964 by-election ====
- Vijaya Lakshmi Pandit (Indian National Congress) : 1,10,549 votes
- S. Jaiswal (Samyukta Socialist Party) : 52,529 votes

=== General elections 1957 ===
- Two members were elected from this seat in 1957.

1957 Indian general election: Phulpur
Party	Candidate	Votes	%	±%
INC	Jawaharlal Nehru (Elected)	2,27,447	36.87	
INC	Masuriya Din (Elected)	1,98,431	32.17	
Margin of victory		29,018	4.70	
Turnout		6,16,862	77.24	
INC hold		Swing		

=== General election 1952 ===
1952 Indian general election: Allahabad East-Jaunpur West
Party	Candidate	Votes	%	±%
INC	Jawaharlal Nehru (Elected)	2,33,571	38.73	
INC	Masuriya Din (Elected)	1,81,700	30.13	
KMPP	Banshi Lal	59,642	9.89	
Independent	Prabhudutt Brahmachari	56,718	9.41	
Independent	K. K. Chatterjee	27,392	4.54	
ABHM	Thate Laxman Ganesh	25,870	4.29	
RSP	Badri Prasad	18,129	3.01	
Margin of victory		51,871	8.60	
Turnout		6,03,022	40.21	
INC win (new seat)				

== See also ==
- Allahabad district
- Allahabad (Mayoral Constituency)
- List of constituencies of the Lok Sabha

== Notes ==
Lok Sabha
New title	Constituency represented by the prime minister 1952-1964	Succeeded by Sabarkantha
