= Kotari, Prayagraj =

Kotari is a village in Hetapatti, Sahason, Phulpur, Prayagraj, Uttar Pradesh, India.

Pin Code: 221507

Coordinate: 25.4810449°N 81.9554°E
