= Raju Pal =

Indian politician (1985–2005)

Member of Uttar Pradesh Legislative Assembly
- In office 2004–2005
- Preceded by: Atiq Ahmed
- Succeeded by: Khalid Azim
- Constituency: Prayagraj West

Personal details
- Born: 18 June 1975
- Died: 25 January 2005 (aged 29)
- Cause of death: Killed by gunshot
- Party: Bahujan Samaj Party
- Spouse: Pooja Pal
- Occupation: Politician

Raju Pal (18 June 1975 – 25 January 2005) was a Bahujan Samaj Party politician in India. In 2004, gangster-politician Atiq Ahmed resigned from Prayagraj West Assembly constituency after being elected to the Lok Sabha. Raju Pal won the subsequent by-election in November 2004, defeating Atiq's younger brother Mohammad Ashraf aka Khalid Azim.

In January 2005, Raju Pal was shot dead while going to his village on the occasion of Republic day by Atiq Ahmed's goons for defeating his brother Ashraf. Thereafter, Ashraf won the seat by defeating Pal's wife Pooja Pal. Ashraf was the prime accused in the murder. Mohammad Ashraf's brother Atiq had also been charged with complicity in the murder. While Atiq was in jail with 21 criminal cases pending against him, the then Mayawati government faced criticism for its failure to arrest Ashraf.

== Political career ==
Raju Pal was known for his involvement in muscle power politics. In the 2004 general election, he contested and won by a margin of 4,000 votes. Pal had contested from the Prayagraj West Assembly seat that had become vacant after Atiq was elected as MP from Phulpur on Samajwadi Party ticket. In the by-election held for this seat, Pal was fielded by the Bahujan Samaj Party and defeated Atiq's younger brother, Ashraf. Pal had faced multiple attempts on his life during his political career. In November and December of the same year, there were two failed attempts to assassinate him, these involved the use of guns and improvised explosives. During one of these attempts, he was severely injured and had to be hospitalized. Despite these incidents, no preventive measures were taken by party leaders or the government. Pal was shot dead in broad daylight on 25 January 2005, a few months after becoming an MLA for the first time.

== Assassination ==
On 25 January 2005, Raju Pal was shot dead in broad daylight, leading to his first-time seat of MLA becoming empty once again. His assassination attracted criticism for the handling of the situation by the government.Atiq Ahmed and his brother Khalid Azim (alias Ashraf) were the main accused in his assassination.

== Aftermath ==
Following Raju Pal's death, Mayawati announced that she would give the party ticket to his widow to contest the by-poll for the vacant seat. His widow Puja Pal then contested the seat against Ashraf Ahmed but lost. She would later defeat him in the 2007 assembly elections and also retain the seat in the 2012 assembly election. On 7 May 2021, one of the main accused in the case, Mohd. Akbar, a history sheeter, died of COVID-19. On 24 February 2023, Umesh Pal, a prime witness in the murder of Raju Pal was killed. Atiq Ahmed was the main accused in Raju Pal and Umesh Pal murder case. On 13 April 2023, Atiq's son Asad was killed in a police encounter. On 15 April 2023, Atiq Ahmed and Ashraf were shot dead while being escorted for a court-mandated medical checkup.
