= Vijama Yadav =

Indian politician

Member of the Uttar Pradesh Legislative Assembly
- Incumbent
- Assumed office 2022
- Preceded by: Mohd Mujtaba Siddqui
- Constituency: Pratappur
- In office 2012–2017
- Preceded by: Jokhu Lal Yadav
- Succeeded by: Mohd Mujtaba Siddqui
- Constituency: Pratappur
- In office 1996–2007
- Preceded by: Jawahar Yadav (Pandit)
- Succeeded by: Praveen Patel
- Constituency: Jhusi

Personal details
- Born: 1971 (age 54–55) Allahabad
- Party: Samajwadi Party
- Spouse: Jawahar Yadav (Pandit)
- Children: Devendra Pratap Singh Yadav; Jyoti Yadav

Vijama Yadav is an Indian politician. She is the widow of the Samajwadi Party leader Jawahar Yadav (Pandit). She was elected to the Uttar Pradesh Legislative Assembly from Pratappur in the 2022 Uttar Pradesh Legislative Assembly election as a member of the Samajwadi Party.

== Entrance in politics ==
Her husband Jawahar Yadav aka Pandit, a member of the Samajwadi Party from the then Jhunsi assembly seat of Allahabad, was elected as a member of the Legislative Assembly for the second consecutive term. Establishing himself as a strong leader, Jawahar Yadav alias Pandit became one of Mulayam Singh Yadav's special people, gradually he ventured into the business of liquor and excavation of morang sand from the Yamuna Ganga basin in which he had a gang war with the Karwariya Family . in June 1995 Mulayam Singh Yadav-led Uttar Pradesh the government fell. Karwariya family was suffering huge losses in the business of Balu Morang from Jawahar Yadav alias Pandit as they had fierce competition with Jawahar Yadav Pandit on their business. After the dissolution of the assembly in 1996, the security he had as an MLA was withdrawn. He requested the government several times for protection but was ignored by the government, on Tuesday, 13 August 1996, when he was going to visit Hanuman ji at Triveni Sangam, He was attacked and murdered with an AK-47 rifle.Karwariya family was suffering huge losses in the business of Balu Morang from Jawahar Yadav alias Pandit as they had fierce competition with Jawahar Yadav Pandit on their business.The Karwariya family was accused of murder. After the murder of her husband, Vijama Yadav came into politics and was elected as MLA on Samajwadi Party ticket for two consecutive terms in 1996, 2002 assembly elections from Jhusi Assembly Constituency. She was defeated in the 2007 and 2017 assembly elections. In 2012 and 2022 Vidhansabha elections she was elected MLA from Pratappur Vidhansabha Constituency.

== Family ==
Vijama Yadav has a daughter and a son, daughter's name is Jyoti Yadav who has been Block Pramukh of Phulpur block of Prayagraj and son Devendra Pratap Singh Yadav alias Golu has been an honorary councilor of Prayagraj Municipal Corporation.

== Posts held ==
#	From	To	Position
01	1996	2002	MLA from Jhusi
02	2002	2007	MLA from Jhusi
03	2012	2017	MLA from Pratappur
04	2022	-	MLA from Pratappur
