= Yadan (surname) =

Yadan is a surname. Notable people with the surname include:

- Caroline Yadan (born 1968), French politician
- Hu Yadan (born 1996), Chinese diver

== See also ==
- Yadav (surname)
