= Dharmraj Patel =

Indian politician

Dharmraj Singh Patel

Member of Parliament Lok Sabha
- In office 1999–2004
- Preceded by: Jang Bahadur Singh Patel
- Succeeded by: Atique Ahmed
- Constituency: Phulpur (Lok Sabha constituency)

Personal details
- Born: Allahabad, Uttar Pradesh
- Party: Samajwadi Party
- Spouse: Sushma Singh
- Children: Savita Singh Ajay Singh Ashutosh Singh
- Profession: Politician, Lawyer
- Website: dharamrajpatel.com

Dharmraj Singh Patel is an Indian politician from Phulpur, Allahabad constituency from Samajwadi Party. He is also a former elected member of Phulpur (Lok Sabha constituency) from Samajwadi Party.
