= Mumtaz M. Kazi =

Indian train engineer

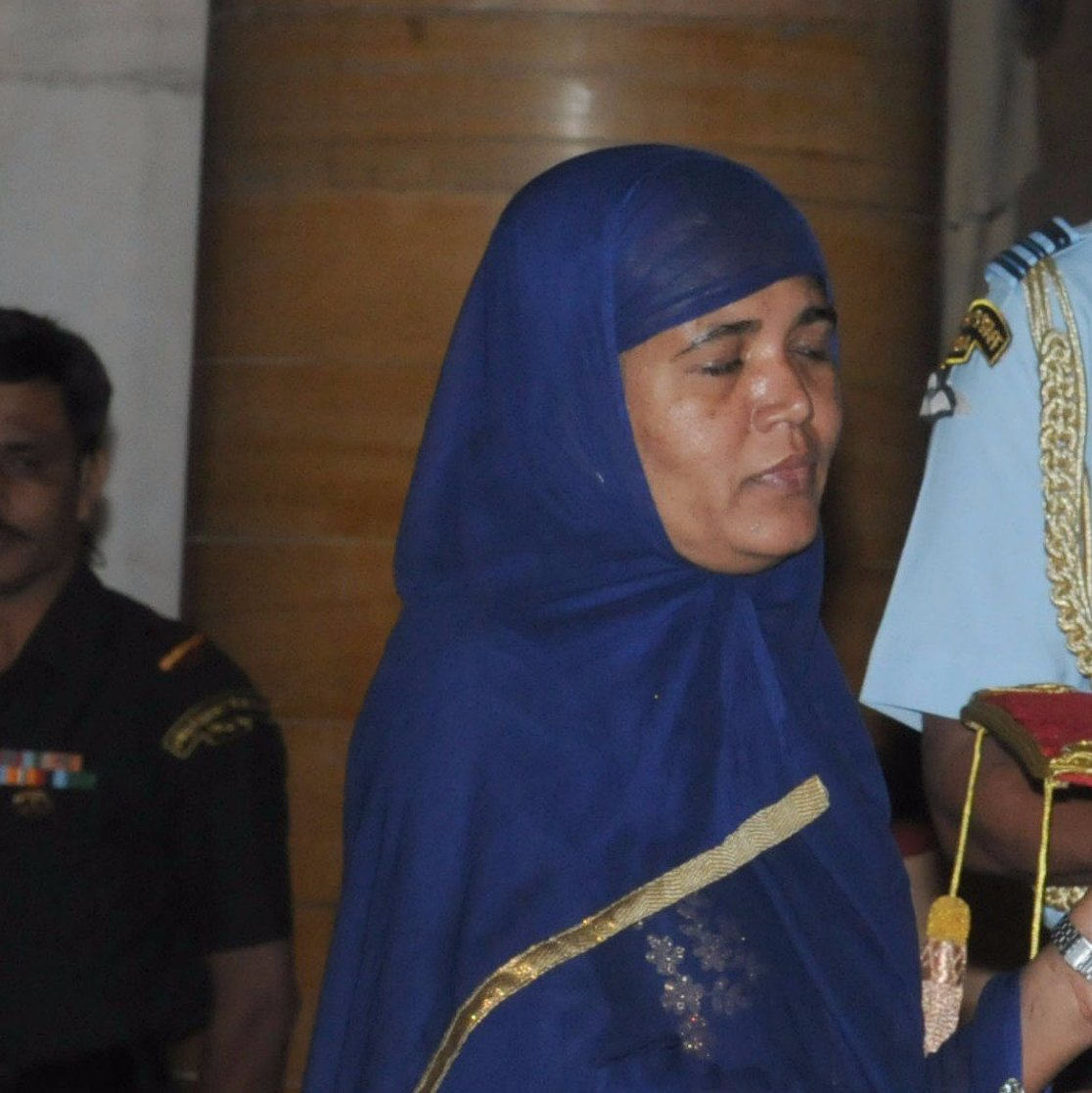
- Kazi in 2017
- Born: Mumbai, Maharashtra, Indian
- Spouse: Maqsood Kazi
- Awards: 2017 Nari Shakti Puraskar

Mumtaz née Maqsood Ahmed Kazi, also popularly known as Mumtaz M. Kazi, is an Indian train engineer who is also regarded as the first Indian woman to drive a diesel engine train. She is also Asia's first woman locomotive driver after Surekha Yadav. She was awarded the Nari Shakti Puraskar in March 2017, coinciding the International Women's Day, by then Indian President Pranab Mukherjee.

== Early life ==
Kazi was born and raised up in Mumbai, the commercial capital of the Maharashtra state, and hails from an orthodox Muslim family. She graduated from the Seth Anandilal Rodar High School in Santacruz in 1989. Her father, Allarakhu Ismail Kathwala, served as an employee in the Indian Railways. Mumtaz followed in her father's footsteps and pursued a career as a full time train driver. However, she was initially not allowed by her father to take a job in the Railways department; he told her to complete the course in Medical Laboratory Technology, but Mumtaz later convinced him to change his mind.

== Career ==
After her graduation in 1989, she applied for the post of engine driver. She started driving trains at the age of 20, in 1991, and was recognised by the Limca Book of Records as the second Asian female locomotive driver in 1995, first being Surekha Yadav of Maharashtra itself.

She was promoted from ALP-diesel to second motorwoman in 2005. After that she piloted the local trains on India's first and most congested railway route, the Chhatrapati Shivaji Maharaj Terminus - Thane section, until 2023.

She received Nari Shakti Puraskar award, an annual award recognizing the achievements of women in India. She also received Railway General Manager Award in 2015 from the Indian Railways.

== Personal life ==
She married electrical engineer Maqsood Kazi.
