= Chhedi Ka Pura =

Village in Uttar Pradesh, India

Chhedi Ka Pura is a small village in Phulpur, Uttar Pradesh. It is also known as Saodeeh.
