= Operation Economic Fury =

2026 US operation to pressure Iran economically

- Operation Economic Outcast; Part of the 2026 Iran war, Iranian economic, energy, and internal crisis
- Date: 20 August 2026 – present (2 months, 3 weeks and 6 days)
- Location: Iran and third countries trading with Iran
- Caused by: Stalled ceasefire talks between the United States and Iran; Continued Iranian disruption of shipping through the Strait of Hormuz
- Goals: Isolating the economy of Iran from global trade and finance; Pressuring third countries, including China, to halt purchases of Iranian oil; Targeting more than 60 entities, individuals and vessels tied to Iran
- Methods: Secondary sanctions on countries and financial institutions in the oil, banking, digital assets, technology, gold, aviation and shipping sectors; Sanctions on oil smuggling networks, swap lines, cash transfers, exchange houses, ship registries and front companies; Closure of Bank Melli branches abroad
- Status: Ongoing: Value of Iranian rial falls to record low of 2.05 million per 1 USD; United Arab Emirates suspends trade with Iran

Parties
United States; Supported by: European Union	Iran

Lead figures
Donald Trump; Scott Bessent	Mojtaba Khamenei (WIA); Masoud Pezeshkian; Abbas Araghchi; Mohsen Rezaee

"Operation Economic Fury" was an economic operation announced by U.S. President Donald Trump against Iran on August 19, 2026. Trump declared this measure after negotiations between the two countries reached an impasse. In a post on the social media platform Truth Social, he stated that Iran had "missed" the opportunity to reach an agreement and would face "economic warfare and isolation on an unprecedented scale." President Trump ordered a plan for an "Economic D-Day" against Iran amidst growing frustration over the failure to reopen the Strait of Hormuz.

In late September 2026, following the "Day of the Economy" operation and the naval blockade of Iran, the United States sought to intensify economic pressure on the country by sanctioning Iranian flights. This comes as Iran had previously stated that, should the naval blockade be lifted, it could open the Strait of Hormuz for seven days.

In November 2026, US Secretary of State Marco Rubio said additional military measures against Iran were unnecessary, arguing that economic sanctions were already undermining Tehran.

== Background ==
For several months, the US Treasury has been carrying out "Operation Economic Fury," focusing on cutting off Iran’s financial resources through sanctions and economically isolating the country. Additionally, a naval blockade in the Strait of Hormuz is in place to stop Iranian oil exports, which are vital to Iran’s economy.

The U.S. has imposed sanctions on Iran's oil and shipping to reduce its energy revenue.

== Content ==
In a message posted on Truth, Trump declared: "Any country that allows its financial institutions, companies, airports, or government entities to provide any kind of lifeline to Iran will itself face massive economic consequences. Oil smuggling, swap lines, cash transfers, currency exchanges, ship registrations, and front companies—all of this must stop immediately. You know who you are. This will be an 'Economic D-Day,' and we need all our allies to stand with the United States to isolate and neutralize the threat posed by Iran." However, Trump did not clarify the specific measures the United States would implement beyond the already stringent sanctions imposed on Tehran. This announcement came as Trump faced pressure regarding the costs of a war with Iran, with the U.S. midterm elections approaching.

Iranian Foreign Minister Abbas Araghchi dismissed Trump's recent threats of economic sanctions against Iran. Araghchi accused the US of engaging in economic terrorism that threatens the global economy and the sovereignty of nations worldwide.

== Air sanctions against Iran ==
U.S. Treasury Secretary Scott Bessent stated that Iranian airlines could be banned from international travel starting on 23 September, as the U.S. threatens foreign companies with secondary sanctions for supporting these airlines. He warned that services like fuel and ticketing would be denied to these carriers, pushing foreign businesses out of the dollar system if they comply. This action is part of the Trump administration's ongoing economic campaign against Tehran, which includes sanctions on Iranian airlines and companies assisting them.

Mohsen Rezaei, Secretary of Iran's Supreme National Security Council, told the country's state media: "I call upon all neighboring countries not to participate in the United States' adventurism. This adventure will soon end in failure." Rezaei warned that Tehran would take retaliatory action against neighboring countries that cooperate with U.S. restrictions. According to Iranian sources, all flights between Iran and the United Arab Emirates were cancelled on September 24. Some flight routes to Turkey and China remain operational.

Iranian airlines have been banned from flying to neighboring countries like the UAE and Oman due to new US sanctions. The UAE's aviation authority announced that all Iranian flights were suspended until further notice. Reports indicated that flights to Oman, Georgia, Azerbaijan, and Baghdad were also halted. This follows the US declaring it would sanction any global companies working with Iranian airlines, aiming to ground Iran's civil fleet. Other Gulf countries have also limited flights. Iran warned that this could escalate tensions, with officials threatening to make airports "unusable" in regional countries. The new US strategy emphasizes secondary sanctions, likened to "economic D-Day" by Trump. If the flight ban continues, it may worsen Iran's economic crisis, already impacted by maritime blockades.

=== China ===
China opposes the new US sanctions targeting Iran's commercial aviation, calling them illegal and lacking international support. Foreign Ministry spokesman Guo Jiakun criticized Washington's actions. US Treasury Secretary Scott Bessent mentioned that enforcement discussions with China have taken place, focusing on financial intermediaries aiding Tehran. These sanctions are part of Operation Economic Fury amid ongoing conflict in Iran.

== Time line ==
=== November ===
The Trump administration has decided to implement gradual economic pressure on Iran rather than engaging in military conflict or negotiations. US Secretary of State Marco Rubio talked about current tactics such as a naval blockade and stringent sanctions, noting that Iran's economy is deteriorating and could worsen in the near future. An economist cautioned that decreased oil revenues might cause serious difficulties for Iran, impacting government spending and the currency's value. Iranian officials assert that there will be no collapse and may look for options to lift the blockade.

== Impact ==
=== Air sanctions ===
According to experts, airspace restrictions could lead to the loss of thousands of jobs in the aviation and tourism sectors across Iran and neighboring countries due to escalating tensions. Passenger traffic at Dubai Airport saw a 31% decline in the first half of 2026 compared to the previous year.

== Reaction ==
=== Iran ===
State media outlets dismissed Trump's remarks as offering no new information.

The Islamic Republic of Iran Broadcasting (IRIB) linked the move to the "failure of military aggression." The semi-official Tasnim news agency noted that the U.S. has spent years trying to block Iran's financial and economic ties.

=== United State ===
Daniel Fried, an American diplomat, said the new Iran sanctions announced by Bessent are described as a "warning shot" rather than a serious blow to Iran's economy. The sanctions target firms from Iran, China, and others, as well as ghost-fleet tankers, but are not expected to change the situation much. Bessent suggested that taking stronger action against major Chinese firms could harm the global financial system, which he wants to avoid. The U.S. administration recognizes that achieving quick results against Iran may not be feasible and aims for a more sustainable approach, despite potential challenges due to its volatile nature.

Khalid Azim believed that Operation Economic Outcast aims to put financial pressure on the Iranian government and hinder its global transactions. However, the economic impact may be less significant than suggested since Iran has experience adapting to sanctions by finding alternative methods. There is often a delay in the implementation of sanctions, allowing Iran time to adjust. The absence of major Asian entities might limit the sanctions' effectiveness. Success should be evaluated based on whether the goal is simply to raise costs or to significantly restrict Iran's funding for the war.

=== Other ===
Mike Hanna of Al Jazeera reported from Washington, D.C., on Trump's recent actions regarding the ongoing conflict with Iran. He noted that Trump's measures reflect frustration with the five-month stalemate and suggested that Trump's primary audience may be the American public, who largely oppose the continuation of the conflict.

Experts caution that implementing these sanctions might lead to a direct clash with China, which is Iran’s biggest trading partner. The United States is currently trying to establish a new trade relationship with Beijing, making sanctions against China a delicate issue. Gregory Brew, a senior analyst at Eurasia Group, highlighted the challenge for the US in targeting China due to its vital importance to Iran’s economic prospects.

In China, targeting financial institutions that work with independent teapot refineries, which still buy Iranian oil, is possible. However, the Chinese government advises against cooperating with US sanctions. The US may struggle to enforce trade restrictions with Iran through neighboring countries. Brett Erickson, managing principal at Obsidian Risk Advisor, said Trump has not yet used certain measures, indicating their risks. Punitive actions against Chinese banks dealing with Iran could be very effective, but timing remains a significant challenge.

== Analysis ==
Various analysts expressed skepticism regarding the effectiveness of the sanctions and warned of significant global repercussions. Daniel Fried characterized the measures as neither an "economic death blow" nor a game changer, while Andrew L. Peek argued that their impact would be limited by Iran’s ability to evade maritime oil restrictions and source funds through neighbors. The announcement coincided with the Iranian rial hitting a record low, with the rial dropping to 2.05 million to the US dollar on the open market as trading began, compared with an official central bank rate of around 1.5 million rial to the dollar. Days earlier, the United Arab Emirates had announced it was suspending all trade with Iran, one of Iran's largest trading partners and biggest sources of imports.

Jonathan Panikoff further questioned their efficacy, citing the Gulf states' reluctance to isolate Iran, the difficulty of severing China's financial ties to Tehran, and regional doubts about U.S. policy consistency.

Beyond effectiveness, Maia Nikoladze warned that escalating against Chinese financial institutions could trigger Chinese retaliation in critical minerals, a sentiment echoed by Kenneth Rogoff, who noted that sanctions might accelerate dedollarization and prompt China to leverage its control over rare earths and pharmaceuticals. Lesley Chavkin aligned with Rogoff, observing that such measures could drive trade toward non-dollar financial channels that remain inaccessible to the United States. Nasser Hadian, a University of Tehran professor, believes that Iranian leaders won't tolerate the current conditions forever, arguing that a tighter blockade would increase the likelihood of war.

=== Air sanctions ===
According to Negar Mortazavi, a senior fellow at the U.S.-based Center for International Policy, the aim of Rezaei’s warning is to deter Iran’s neighbors; the implication is that complying with U.S. aviation sanctions is viewed as supporting Washington’s pressure campaign against Iran. This situation draws third countries into the conflict between Iran and the United States.

== Reference ==
- Atlantic, Council (2026). "Experts react: Will Trump's Operation Economic Outcast isolate Iran?". atlanticcouncil.org.
