= Pooja Pal =

Indian politician

Member of Uttar Pradesh Legislative Assembly
- Incumbent
- Assumed office 2022
- Preceded by: Sanjay Kumar
- Constituency: Chail
- In office 2007–2017
- Preceded by: Khalid Azim
- Succeeded by: Sidharth Nath Singh
- Constituency: Allahabad West

Personal details
- Born: 25 July 1979 (age 47) Allahabad, Uttar Pradesh, India
- Party: Bharatiya Janata Party (2026-present)
- Other political affiliations: Samajwadi Party (2020-2025) Bahujan Samaj Party (2007-2020)
- Spouse(s): Brijesh Verma Raju Pal (died 2005)
- Parent: Amrit Lal Pal (father)
- Education: Swami Vivekanand Subharti University
- Profession: Agriculture

Pooja Pal is an Indian politician from Uttar Pradesh. She is the wife of former Allahabad West MLA Raju Pal who was gunned down in broad daylight soon after defeating Ashraf Ahmad in the 2004 elections for the seat.

Subsequently, Ashraf Ahmad, who was named as the prime accused in the murder became the MLA in 2005. However, in the 2007 Uttar Pradesh state assembly elections, Ashraf was defeated by Pooja Pal.

Pooja Pal had filed a request for a CBI investigation into the murder of Raju Pal. In her nomination papers as a Samajwadi Party candidate from Chail in the 2022 Uttar Pradesh Assembly elections, she entered her husband's name as Brijesh Verma, then her inter-caste marriage became public.

She was elected on Samajwadi Party ticket from Chail in the 2022 Uttar Pradesh Legislative Assembly election.

== Clash with Akhilesh Yadav ==
Pooja Pal was expelled from Samajwadi Party on 14 August 2025 for praising CM Yogi Adityanath for delivering justice to her and to women after the death of gangster-politician Atiq Ahmed and for making serious allegations.

After this she became a bitter critic of ex Uttar Pradesh Chief Minister and Samajwadi Party President Akhilesh Yadav levelling all kinds of serious allegations, including threat to her life from Yadav. She continues to do so, while Akhilesh Yadav and Samajwadi Party call these allegations purely political acts.
