= Shekhar Kumar Yadav =

Judge at the Allahabad High Court

Hon'ble Justice Shekhar Kumar Yadav
- Official portrait

Judge of the Allahabad High Court
- In office 12 Desember 2019 – 15 April 2026

Personal details
- Born: 16 April 1964 (age 62)
- Occupation: Judge
- Profession: Law

Shekhar Kumar Yadav (born 16 April 1964) is an Indian judge serving in the Allahabad High Court since 12 December 2019. His position as judge has been in the spotlight following reportedly Islamophobic comments he made in December 2024 at an event of the right-wing Vishwa Hindu Parishad. Calls for his removal include an impeachment motion initiated against him in Parliament seeking his removal as judge on grounds of promoting majoritarianism and hate speech.

== Contentious comments ==
Yadav is known for his public support for Hindu nationalism, which was seen as a sharp departure from the standard norms of the Judiciary of India. He has publicly supported ban on cow slaughter in India & implementation of a Uniform Civil Code. Some of his famous comments are —

Scientists believe the cow is the only animal that inhales and exhales oxygen. This [cow's milk] gives special energy to sunrays, which ultimately causes rain. Panchgavya which is made of cow milk, curd, ghee, urine and cow dung helps in treatment of several incurable diseases.

Parliament must bring law to pay ‘rashtriya samman’ (national honour) to Lord Ram, Lord Krishna, Ramayan and its author Valmiki besides Gita and its author Maharishi Ved Vyas, as they are the culture and heritage of the country

Cow is the culture of India and the work of saving the culture is of every citizen living in the country irrespective of religion. Fundamental right is not only the prerogative of beef eaters, rather, those who worship the cow and are financially dependent on cows, also have the right to lead a meaningful life. India will prosper only if cows are revered.

In December 2024, Yadav courted controversy by using derogatory slurs against Muslims in India & mocking the practice of Islamic circumcision while delivering a speech at an event in Prayagraj organised by the Vishwa Hindu Parishad. Amid calls for sacking him, a motion of impeachment against him on grounds of promoting majoritarianism & hate-speech has been initiated in the Parliament.
