= Swami Vivekanand Subharti University =

Private university in Meerut, Uttar Pradesh, India

Swami Vivekananda Subharti University
- Motto: Education for All
- Type: Private University
- Established: 2008
- Founders: Dr. Atul Krishna; Dr. Mukti Bhatnagar
- Affiliations: UGC
- Chancellor: Stuti Narain Kacker
- Vice-Chancellor: Maj. Gen. (Dr.) G. K. Thapliyal, SM (Retd.)
- Faculty: 765
- Students: 6375
- Undergraduates: 4071
- Postgraduates: 884
- Location: Meerut, Uttar Pradesh, India; 28.958°N 77.635°E
- Campus: 250+ acres; Urban
- Nickname: SVSU
- Website: www.subharti.org

Swami Vivekanand Subharti University is a private university located in Meerut, Uttar Pradesh, India. The university was established in September 2008 and has 14 faculties.

== Campus ==
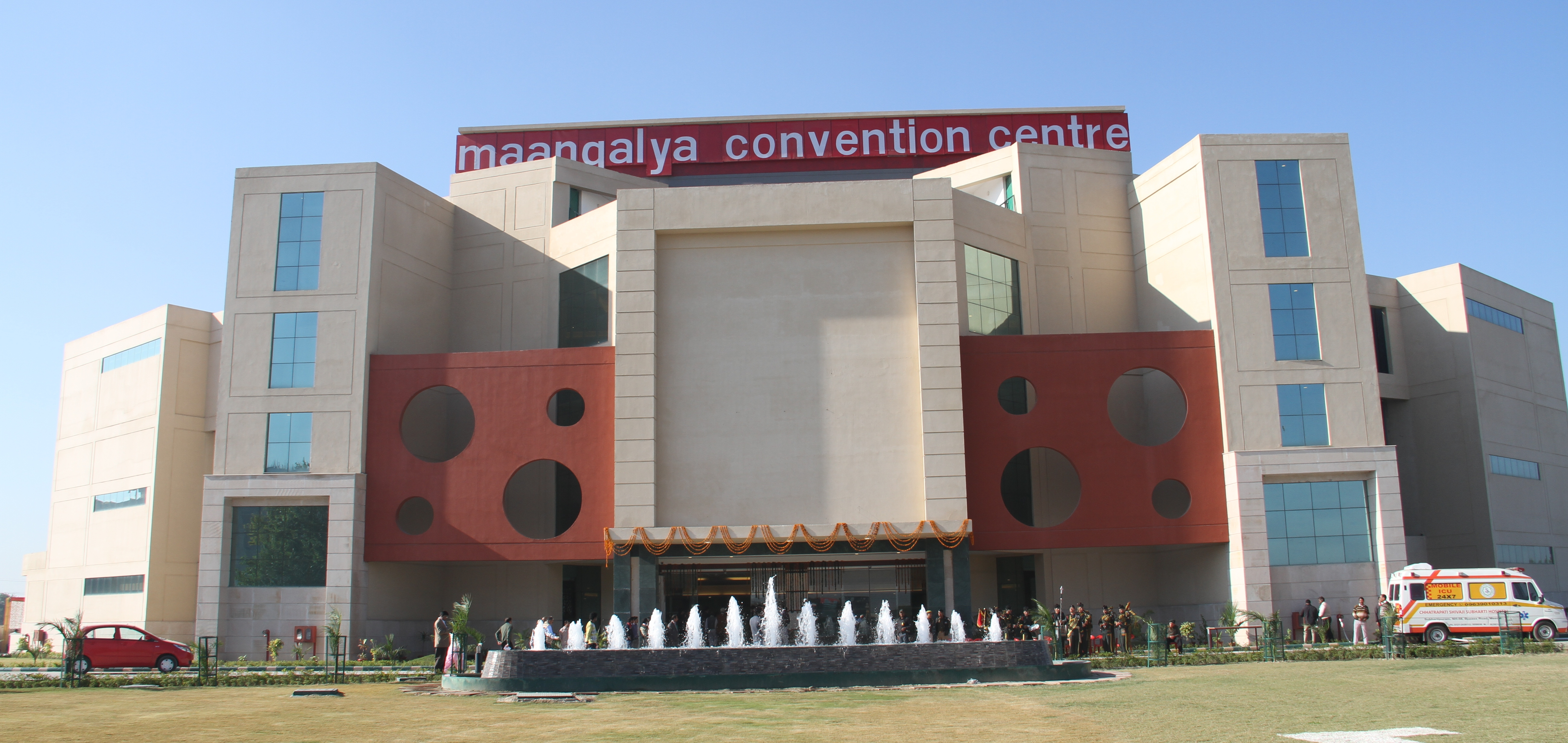
Auditorium building

The university is situated on a 250-acre campus in Meerut, in the National Capital Region of India. It includes a 1042-bed hospital and an auditorium with 2,500 seating capacity. There are 13 hostels for students and ten residential complexes for faculty members and staff.

== Faculties ==
The university's academic structure consists of 52 departments beneath the following 14 faculties:

- Arts and Social Science (Estd. 2009)
- Dental Science (Estd. 1997)
- Education (Estd. 2008)
- Engineering and Technology (Estd. 2005)
- Hotel Management (Estd. 2009)
- Journalism and Mass Communication (Estd. 2008)
- Law (Estd. 2002)
- Library Science (Estd. 2011)
- Management and Commerce (Estd. 2008)
- Medical (Estd. 2000)
- Nursing (Estd. 2000)
- Para-Medical Sciences (Estd. 1999)
- Pharmacy (Estd. 2009)
- Science (Estd. 2012)

== Notable alumni ==
- Pooja Pal, MLA
- Dr Tanu Jain BDS, IDES

Trainer for IAS

== External collaboration ==
The university has signed Memorandum of Understanding with 25 other universities and organizations.
