= Anugrah Narayan Singh (Uttar Pradesh politician) =

Indian politician

- Occupation: Member of the Legislative Assembly (MLA)

Anugrah Narayan Singh is an Indian politician from the Indian National Congress party. He is a four-time Member of the Legislative Assembly (MLA) from Allahabad North Assembly Constituency in Allahabad of Uttar Pradesh and this time Uttrakhand congress president.

== Career ==
Studying Bachelor of Arts in 1969 & LLB in 1972 from Allahabad University, Anugrah Narayan Singh became the president of Allahabad University, winning the election by the highest margin until now.

He served as the MLA of Allahabad North seat for four terms, winning elections in 1985, 1989, 2007 and 2012.

He lost his seat in the 2017 Uttar Pradesh Assembly election to Harshvardhan Bajpai of the Bharatiya Janata Party.
