= Jawahar Yadav (Pandit) =

Former leader of the Samajwadi Party

Member of Uttar Pradesh Legislative Assembly
- In office 1993–1996
- Preceded by: Mahendra Pratap Singh
- Succeeded by: Vijama Yadav
- Constituency: Jhusi

Personal details
- Born: Unknown Jaunpur
- Died: 13 August 1996 Civil Lines Prayagraj
- Party: Samajwadi Party
- Spouse: Vijama Yadav
- Children: Devendra Pratap Singh Yadav, Jyoti Yadav

Jawahar Yadav, alias Pandit, was an Indian politician from the Samajwadi Party. He was elected as a Member of the Uttar Pradesh Legislative Assembly from Jhunsi Vidhansabha of Allahabad district (which was converted into Phulpur Vidhansabha after 2008 delimitation). Jawahar was originally from Jaunpur, who came to the neighboring district Allahabad in search of employment and started the business of liquor and extracting morang sand from the Ganga-Yamuna basin.

== Rise in politics ==
Along with his business activities, Jawahar Yadav entered politics by joining the Janata Dal in 1989. In 1992, he joined the newly formed Samajwadi Party. He contested and won the Jhusi Assembly seat in the 1993 Uttar Pradesh Legislative Assembly election as a Samajwadi Party candidate.

== Gang war between Jawahar and Karwariya family ==
After he was elected MLA, Jawahar Yadav became involved in sand mining contracts in the Ganga-Yamuna river basin, which led to disputes with the Karwariya family, who were already active in the Morang sand business. Conflicts escalated, including reports of threats and armed confrontations. A meeting was reportedly held to agree not to interfere in each other's contracts, but disputes continued. After the dissolution of the Legislative Assembly in 1996, Jawahar Yadav's security as an MLA became lax, although he requested the government to increase his security several times, but the government did not pay heed. On 16 August 1996, when he was going to visit the Bade Hanuman ji located at Triveni Sangam in Prayagraj, his car was surrounded and killed in the Civil Lines area, along with his driver and a security guard, who also died for the first time. Happened when an AK-47 rifle was used in the murder of a politician. Karwariya brothers accused of murder Those who have been sentenced to life imprisonment by the court and are now serving their sentence.

== Personal life ==
Yadav was married to Vijama Yadav. They have 3 children (2 daughters and 1 son). After his murder, Vijma enteted politics and was elected MLA four times (twice from Jhunsi and twice from Pratappur).
