= Gopal Das Yadav =

Indian politician (born 1942)

- गोपाल दास यादव

MLA in 9th Legislative Assembly of Uttar Pradesh
- In office March 1985 – November 1989
- Preceded by: Chaudhary Naunihal Singh
- Succeeded by: Atiq Ahmed
- Constituency: Allahabad West

Personal details
- Born: 6 May 1942 Allahabad, United Province, British India present Prayagraj, Uttar Pradesh, India
- Died: 31 March 2021 (aged 78) Lucknow, Uttar Pradesh, India
- Party: Samajwadi Party
- Spouse: Sarswati Devi
- Children: Jyoti Yadav
- Education: M.Sc., M.Ed.
- Occupation: Business

Gopal Das Yadav (6 May 1942 – 31 March 2021) was an Indian politician who was a member of the 9th Uttar Pradesh Legislative Assembly from Allahabad West. He was the General Secretary of the Chemists and Druggists Association, after the imposition of emergency in the country, he joined the movement of Jai Prakash Narayan, during the emergency he was arrested by the government and put in Naini Jail Allahabad. He joined the Janata Party. When Chaudhary Charan Singh formed Lok Dal, he joined his party. When Chaudhary Charan Singh became the Finance Minister of the country, Gopal Das was made a member of the Advisory Committee of the Finance Ministry of the Government of India.

== Career ==
In 1985, he was elected MLA from Lok Dal from Allahabad City West Assembly seat. After the split of Lok Dal, he joined the Congress in 1989 and as a Congress candidate, he lost to Atiq Ahmed by 8,102 votes. In the 1990s, he joined the Samajwadi Party and remained a member until his death. His son Jyoti Yadav has been a cricketer. He died of COVID-19 on March 31, 2021 at SGPGI Lucknow during the COVID-19 pandemic.
