= Ram Pujan Patel =

Indian politician

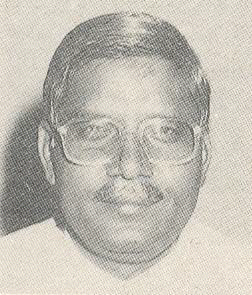

Member of Parliament, Lok Sabha
- In office 1984-1996
- Preceded by: B. D. Singh
- Succeeded by: Jang Bahadur Patel
- Constituency: Phulpur

Minister of State for Food and Civil Supplies
- In office 23 April 1990 – 10 November 1990
- Constituency: Phulpur

Personal details
- Born: 26 June 1940 Allahabad, United Provinces, British India
- Died: 23 February 2021 (81 years) Prayagraj, United Provinces, British India
- Party: Janata Dal (before 1990), Indian National Congress (from 1996 to 2010), Samajwadi Party (since 2010 to 2021)
- Spouse: Kamla Devi
- Children: 3 Sons

Ram Pujan Patel was an Indian politician. He was elected to the Lok Sabha, which is the lower house of the Parliament of India. He came from Phulpur, Uttar Pradesh as a member of the Janata Dal. He held the position of Minister of State for Food and Civil Supplies in V. P. Singh ministry from 23 April 1990 to 10 November 1990. He was also Uttar Pradesh State Janata Dal president.
