= Allahabad West Assembly constituency =

Constituency of the Uttar Pradesh legislative assembly in India

Coordinates: 25.43°N 81.77°E

Allahabad West
- Constituency No. 261 for the Uttar Pradesh Legislative Assembly

Constituency details
- Country: India
- Region: North India
- State: Uttar Pradesh
- District: Prayagraj
- Total electors: 4,18,849 (2018)
- Reservation: None

Member of Legislative Assembly
- 18th Uttar Pradesh Legislative Assembly
- Incumbent Sidharth Nath Singh
- Party: Bharatiya Janta Party
- Elected year: 2022

Allahabad West is a constituency of the Uttar Pradesh Legislative Assembly in the Prayagraj city of Uttar Pradesh, India.

Allahabad West is one of five assembly constituencies in the Phulpur Lok Sabha constituency. Since 2008, this assembly constituency is numbered 261 amongst 403 constituencies.

Currently this seat is represented by Bharatiya Janta Party candidate Siddharth Nath Singh who won in last Assembly election of 2022 Uttar Pradesh Legislative Elections defeating Samajwadi Party candidate Richa Singh by a margin of 29,873 votes.

== Members of Legislative Assembly ==
Year	Member	Party
1967	Chaudhary Naunihal Singh	Indian National Congress
1969	Habib Ahmad	Independent
1974	Tirath Ram Kohli	Bharatiya Jan Sangh
1977	Habib Ahmad	Janata Party
1979^	Chaudhary Naunihal Singh	Indian National Congress (I)
1980	Chaudhary Naunihal Singh	Indian National Congress (I)
1985	Gopal Das Yadav	Lokdal
1989	Atiq Ahmed	Independent
1991	Atiq Ahmed	Independent
1993	Atiq Ahmed	Independent
1996	Atiq Ahmed	Samajwadi Party
2002	Atiq Ahmed	Apna Dal (K)
2004^	Raju Pal	Bahujan Samaj Party
2005^	Khalid Azim	Samajwadi Party
2007	Pooja Pal	Bahujan Samaj Party
2012	Pooja Pal	Bahujan Samaj Party
2017	Sidharth Nath Singh	Bharatiya Janata Party
2022	Sidharth Nath Singh	Bharatiya Janata Party

^ by poll

== Election results ==
=== 2027 ===
2027 Uttar Pradesh Legislative Assembly election: Allahabad West
Party	Candidate	Votes	%	±%
INDIA				
NDA				
BSP				
NOTA	None of the above			
Majority				
Turnout				
gain from		Swing		

=== 2022 ===
2022 Uttar Pradesh Legislative Assembly election: Allahabad West
Party	Candidate	Votes	%	±%
BJP	Siddharth Nath Singh	118,759	53.29	+10.25
SP	Richa Singh	88,826	39.86	+9.57
BSP	Gulam Qadir	7,626	3.42	−16.96
INC	Tasleem Uddin	2,295	1.03	
NOTA	None of the above	1,518	0.68	−0.16
Majority		29,933	13.43	+0.68
Turnout		222,861	48.49	+1.05
BJP hold		Swing		

=== 2017 ===
2017 Uttar Pradesh Legislative Assembly election: Allahabad West
Party	Candidate	Votes	%	±%
BJP	Sidharth Nath Singh	85,518	43.04	
SP	Richa Singh	60,182	30.29	
BSP	Pooja Pal	40,499	20.38	
Independent	Hasan Akhlaq Alias Rizwan Niwan	4,018	2.02	
NISHAD	Chandradev Singh Alias Daya Singh Bismark	2,974	1.5	
NOTA	None of the above	1,659	0.84	
Majority		25,336	12.75	
Turnout		198,692	47.44	
BJP gain from BSP		Swing	+28.64	

=== 2012 ===
Uttar Pradesh Legislative Assembly Election, 2012: Allahabad West
Party	Candidate	Votes	%	±%
BSP	Pooja Pal	71,114	40.11	
AD(S)	Atiq Ahmad	62,229	35.10	
SP	Jyoti Yadav	18,867	10.64	
BJP	Ramji Kesarwani	9,740	5.49	
INC	Ravi Prakash	4,933	2.78	
Majority		8,885	5.01	
Turnout		1,77,311	51.74	
BSP hold		Swing		

=== 2007 ===
U. P. Legislative Assembly Election, 2007
Party	Candidate	Votes	%	±%
BSP	Pooja Pal	56,198	47.08	
SP	Khalid Azim	45,876	38.43	
BJP	Keshav Prasad Maurya	11,111	9.31	
INC	Syed Mohammad Shahab	2,110	1.76	
Independent	Sachin Sonkar	918	0.77	
Majority		10,322	8.65	
Turnout		1,19,355	34.05	
BSP gain from SP		Swing		

=== 2005 bypoll ===
By Election, 2005
Party	Candidate	Votes	%	±%
SP	Khalid Azim	90,836	52.42	
BSP	Pooja Pal	77,453	44.69	
BJP	Lakshmi Shankar Ojha	1,410	0.82	
Independent	Vasudev	1,140	0.66	
INC	Sanjay Krishna Srivastava	660	0.38	
Majority		13,383	7.73	
Turnout		1,73,282	45.30	
SP gain from BSP		Swing		

=== 2004 bypoll ===
By Election, 2004
Party	Candidate	Votes	%	±%
BSP	Raju Pal	70,533	47.16	
SP	Khalid Azim	65,715	43.94	
BJP	Keshav Prasad Maurya	6,116	4.09	
INC	Anshuman Singh	2,313	1.55	
AD(S)	Syed Asaf	1,165	0.78	
Majority		4,818	3.22	
Turnout		1,49,555	40.08	
BSP gain from AD(K)		Swing		

=== 2002 ===
2002 Uttar Pradesh Legislative Assembly election: Allahabad West
Party	Candidate	Votes	%	±%
AD(K)	Atiq Ahmad	39,532	36.09	
SP	Gopal Das Yadava	27,724	25.31	
BSP	Amar Nath Singh Maurya	20,141	18.39	
BJP	Pandit Laxmi Shanker Ojha	15,261	13.93	
Majority		11,808	10.78	
Turnout		109,548	30.24	
AD(K) gain from SP		Swing		

=== 1996 ===
1996 Uttar Pradesh Legislative Assembly election: Allahabad West
Party	Candidate	Votes	%	±%
SP	Atiq Ahmed	73,152	53.98	
BJP	Teerath Ram Kohli	38,053	28.08	
BSP	Javed Iqbal	21,005	15.50	
Majority		35,099	25.90	
Turnout		135,519	40.63	
SP gain from Independent		Swing		

=== 1993 ===
1993 Uttar Pradesh Legislative Assembly election: Allahabad West
Party	Candidate	Votes	%	±%
Independent	Atiq Ahmed	56,914	49.85	
BJP	Tirath Ram Kohli	47,597	41.69	
INC	Chaudhari Jitendra Nath Singh	4,680	4.10	
Majority		9,317	8.16	
Turnout		114,164	52.03	
Independent hold		Swing		

=== 1991 ===
1991 Uttar Pradesh Legislative Assembly election: Allahabad West
Party	Candidate	Votes	%	±%
Independent	Atiq Ahmad	36,424	51.26	
BJP	Ram Chandra Jaiswal	20,681	29.10	
JD	Mohd. Naseem	4,994	7.03	
Majority		15,743	22.16	
Turnout		74,756	39.19	
Independent hold		Swing		

=== 1989 ===
1989 Uttar Pradesh Legislative Assembly election: Allahabad West
Party	Candidate	Votes	%	±%
Independent	Atiq Ahmed	25,906	33.54	
INC	Gopal Das	17,804	23.05	
Independent	Tirath Ram Kohli	12,237	15.84	
Majority		8,102	10.49	
Turnout		77,239	44.45	
Independent gain from LKD		Swing		
