= Jang Bahadur Singh Patel =

Indian politician

Member of Parliament, Lok Sabha
- In office 1996–1999
- Preceded by: Ram Pujan Patel
- Succeeded by: Dharmraj Patel
- Constituency: Phulpur, Uttar Pradesh

Personal details
- Born: 1 August 1947 Allahabad, United Provinces, British India (present-day Prayagraj, Uttar Pradesh, India)
- Party: Samajwadi Party
- Other political affiliations: Bahujan Samaj Party
- Spouse: Rajkumari Patel

Jang Bahadur Singh Patel is an Indian politician. He was elected to the Lok Sabha, lower house of the Parliament of India from Phulpur, Uttar Pradesh as member of the Samajwadi Party.
