= Chail Assembly constituency =

Constituency of the Uttar Pradesh legislative assembly in India

Coordinates: 25.43°N 81.63°E

Chail
- Constituency No. 253 for the Uttar Pradesh Legislative Assembly

Constituency details
- Country: India
- Region: North India
- State: Uttar Pradesh
- District: Kaushambi
- Total electors: 3,87,838
- Reservation: None

Member of Legislative Assembly
- 18th Uttar Pradesh Legislative Assembly
- Incumbent Pooja Pal
- Party: Independent (BJP supported)
- Elected year: 2022

Chail is a constituency of the Uttar Pradesh Legislative Assembly covering the city of Chail in the Kaushambi district of Uttar Pradesh, India.

Chail is one of five assembly constituencies in the Kaushambi Lok Sabha constituency. Since 2008, this assembly constituency is numbered 253 amongst 403 constituencies.

== Members of the Legislative Assembly ==
Election	Name	Party
1977	Kanhaiya Lal Sonkar	Janata Party
1980	Vijay Prakash	Indian National Congress
1985	Shailender Kumar	Indian National Congress
1989	Shailender Kumar	Indian National Congress
1991	Dinesh Chandra Sonkar	Janata Dal
1993	Shiv Dani	Bharatiya Janata Party
1996	Vijai Prakash	Indian National Congress
2002	Dayaram Pasi	Bahujan Samaj Party
2007	Dayaram Pasi	Bahujan Samaj Party
2012	Mohd Ashif Jafri	Bahujan Samaj Party
2017	Sanjay Kumar	Bharatiya Janata Party
2022	Pooja Pal	Samajwadi Party (Note: Expelled from Samajwadi Party in 2025.)

== Election results ==
=== 2027 ===
2027 Uttar Pradesh Legislative Assembly election: Chail
Party	Candidate	Votes	%	±%
INDIA				
NDA				
BSP				
NOTA	None of the above			
Majority				
Turnout				
gain from		Swing		

=== 2022 ===
2022 Uttar Pradesh Legislative Assembly election: Chail
Party	Candidate	Votes	%	±%
SP	Pooja Pal	88,818	39.65	
AD(S)	Nagendra Singh Patel	75,609	33.76	
BSP	Atul Dwivedi	31,362	14.0	−7.53
Jansatta Dal (L)	Anil Kesharwani	5,089	2.27	
INC	Talat Azim	4,055	1.81	−20.61
AIMIM	Mohibbul Haque	3,208	1.43	
Independent	Amrawati	2,869	1.28	
BMP	Danish Ali	2,795	1.25	+0.05
NOTA	None of the above	1,960	0.88	+0.21
Majority		13,209	5.89	−13.84
Turnout		223,984	57.75	+2.09
SP gain from BJP		Swing		

=== 2017 ===
2017 Uttar Pradesh Legislative Assembly Election: Chail
Party	Candidate	Votes	%	±%
BJP	Sanjay Kumar	85,713	42.15	
INC	Talat Azim	45,597	22.42	
BSP	Mohd Asif Jafri	43,776	21.53	
Independent	Shikha Saroj	6,260	3.08	
Independent	Subhash Chandra	4,557	2.24	
Independent	Roopchand	2,625	1.29	
BMP	Narendra Kumar Maurya	2,432	1.2	
NOTA	None of the above	1,352	0.67	
Majority		40,116	19.73	
Turnout		203,355	55.66	
