= First Sampurnanand ministry =

Government of Uttar Pradesh, India (1954–57)

- Ministry of Uttar Pradesh
- Date formed: 28 December 1954
- Date dissolved: 1957

People and organisations
- Chief Minister: Sampurnanand

History
- Legislature term: 1st Uttar Pradesh Legislative Assembly

The First Sampurnanand ministry was the Council of Ministers in the 1st Uttar Pradesh Legislative Assembly headed by Chief Minister Sampurnanand from 28 December 1954 to 1957.

Council of Ministers of Uttar Pradesh (Sampurnanand Ministry)
State Name	Took Office	Left Office	Name	Office	Portfolio
Uttar Pradesh	28 December 1954	1957	Sampurnanand	Chief Minister	General Administration, Home
Uttar Pradesh	28 December 1954	1957	Hafiz Mohd Ibrahim	Cabinet Minister	Finance, Power, Forest, Cooperatives
Uttar Pradesh	28 December 1954	1957	Hukum Singh (Bisen)	Cabinet Minister	Agriculture and Relief, Rehabilitation
Uttar Pradesh	28 December 1954	1957	Girdhari Lal	Cabinet Minister	Excise, Registration
Uttar Pradesh	28 December 1954	1957	Chandra Bhanu Gupta	Cabinet Minister	Planning, Health, Industries, Civil Supplies
Uttar Pradesh	28 December 1954	1957	Charan Singh	Cabinet Minister	Revenue, Transport
Uttar Pradesh	28 December 1954	1957	Syed Ali Zahir	Cabinet Minister	Law, Self-governance
Uttar Pradesh	28 December 1954	1957	Hargovind Singh	Cabinet Minister	Education, Harijan Assistance
Uttar Pradesh	28 December 1954	1957	Kamalapati Tripathi	Cabinet Minister	Information, Irrigation
Uttar Pradesh	28 December 1954	1957	Vichitra Narayan Sharma	Cabinet Minister	Public Works
Uttar Pradesh	28 December 1954	1957	Acharya Jugal Kishore	Cabinet Minister	Labour, Social Welfare
Uttar Pradesh	28 December 1954	1957	Mangla Prasad	Deputy Minister	Cooperatives
Uttar Pradesh	28 December 1954	1957	Jagmohan Singh Negi	Deputy Minister	Forest
Uttar Pradesh	28 December 1954	1957	Jagan Prasad Rawat	Deputy Minister	Police
Uttar Pradesh	28 December 1954	1957	Muzaffar Hasan	Deputy Minister	Prison
Uttar Pradesh	28 December 1954	1957	Chaturbhuj Sharma	Deputy Minister	Revenue
Uttar Pradesh	28 December 1954	1957	Ram Murti	Deputy Minister	Irrigation
Uttar Pradesh	28 December 1954	1957	Phool Singh	Deputy Minister	Planning
Uttar Pradesh	28 December 1954	1957	Sita Ram	Deputy Minister	Education
Uttar Pradesh	28 December 1954	1957	Kailash Prakash	Deputy Minister	Self-governance
Uttar Pradesh	28 December 1954	1957	Lakshmi Raman Acharya	Deputy Minister	Public Works
Uttar Pradesh	28 December 1954	1957	Kripa Shankar	Parliamentary Secretary	Attached with Chief Minister
Uttar Pradesh	28 December 1954	1957	Banarsi Das	Parliamentary Secretary	Planning, Health, Industries and Civil Supplies
Uttar Pradesh	28 December 1954	1957	Baldev Singh Arya	Parliamentary Secretary	Planning, Health, Industries and Civil Supplies
Uttar Pradesh	28 December 1954	1957	Mohd Rauf Jafri	Parliamentary Secretary	Attached with Agriculture and Relief, Rehabilitation Minister
Uttar Pradesh	28 December 1954	1957	Dharm Singh	Parliamentary Secretary	Attached with Finance, Power, Forest and Cooperatives Minister
Uttar Pradesh	28 December 1954	1957	Lakshmi Shankar Yadav	Parliamentary Secretary	Attached with Information and Irrigation Minister
