= Khalid Azim =

Indian politician (1965-2023)

Member of the Uttar Pradesh Legislative Assembly
- In office 2005–2007
- Preceded by: Raju Pal
- Succeeded by: Pooja Pal
- Constituency: Prayagraj West

Personal details
- Born: 29 April 1975 Prayagraj, Uttar Pradesh, India
- Died: 15 April 2023 (aged 47) Prayagraj, Uttar Pradesh, India
- Cause of death: Assassination
- Party: Samajwadi Party
- Children: 4
- Relatives: Atiq Ahmad (brother)
- Education: Ewing Christian College
- Criminal information
- Spouse: Zainab Fatima
- Criminal charges: Murder, threats, extortion, Kidnapping and land grabbing

Khalid Azim, also known as Ashraf or Ashraf Ahmad (29 April 1975 - 15 April 2023), was an Indian politician who had a criminal background. He served as a Member of Uttar Pradesh Legislative Assembly from the Prayagraj West constituency. He faced 54 criminal cases, including murder, threats, extortion, abduction, and land grabbing offenses under various sections of the Indian Penal Code. He was one of the prime accused in the murder of BSP MLA Raju Pal, and the charges were abated after his death.

He was the brother of Atiq Ahmad, a gangster turned politician who also served as a parliamentarian. He was a member of Atiq Ahmad's IS-227 gang and was considered to be Ahmad's right-hand man by police records.

== Political career ==
Khalid Azim, who was affiliated with the Samajwadi Party, contested the 2005 legislative by-election for the Prayagraj West constituency. The seat had become vacant when his brother Atiq Ahmed was elected as a Member of Parliament from Phulpur. However, Khalid Azim was defeated by Raju Pal from the Bahujan Samaj Party. Following Raju Pal's murder on 25 January 2005, a by-election was held, and he won the election from Prayagraj West constituency.

He contested the 2007 UP legislative elections but was defeated by Raju Pal's widow, Pooja Pal. Khalid Azim and his elder brother Atiq were the prime accused in the murder of BSP MLA Raju Pal.

== Criminal cases and controversies ==
In 1992, the first case was registered against him, at Prayagraj's Mutthiganj police station under various sections of the Indian Penal Code, including 147, 148, 149, 364, 504, and 506, as well as the 7 Criminal Law Amendment Act. It was alleged that he had kidnapped and physically assaulted a youth after an altercation. At the time of the incident, he was reportedly pursuing a degree at Ewing Christian College in Allahabad. Later, cases were registered against him in different districts of Uttar Pradesh in the years 1996, 1997, 2001, 2002, 2003, 2004, 2005 and 2007.

In January 2005, Khalid Azim was named as a prime suspect in the murder of BSP MLA Raju Pal.

In January 2007, his name surfaced in the abduction and gang rape case of two minor girl students from a Madarsa in the Kareli area.

== Personal life ==
Khalid Azim was married to Zainab Ruby and had four children, including three daughters and one son.

== Murder ==
On 15 April 2023, Khalid Azim and his brother Atiq Ahmed were being escorted by Uttar Pradesh Police for a court-ordered medical checkup in Prayagraj when they were attacked in front of media cameras, shot at point-blank range and killed by three men who had posed as media personnel. Legal proceedings against Khalid Azim (alias Ashraf), his brother Atiq Ahmad, and Gulbul (alias Rafiq) in connection with the MLA Raju Pal murder case were closed after their deaths.

== See also ==
- Mafia Raj
- Rent-seeking
- Mukhtar Ansari
- Vikas Dubey
