= Deepak Patel =

Indian Politician

Member of Uttar Pradesh Legislative Assembly
- Incumbent
- Assumed office 23 November 2024
- Preceded by: Praveen Patel
- Constituency: Phulpur

Personal details
- Political party: Bharatiya Janata Party
- Profession: Politician

Deepak Patel is an Indian politician. He is a member of the Uttar Pradesh Legislative Assembly elected from Phulpur Assembly constituency as a member of Bharatiya Janata Party.
