= Jokhu Lal Yadav =

Indian politician

Member of the Uttar Pradesh Legislative Assembly
- In office 2007–2012
- Preceded by: Shyam Surat Upadhyay
- Succeeded by: Vijama Yadav
- Constituency: Paratappur
- In office 1996–2002
- Preceded by: Jawahar Lal Diwakar
- Succeeded by: Shyam Surat Upadhyay
- Constituency: Pratappur
- In office 1993–1996
- Preceded by: Brijbhan Yadav
- Succeeded by: Rakesh Dhar Tripathi
- Constituency: Handia

Personal details
- Born: 16 August 1956 (age 70) Allahabad, Uttar Pradesh, India
- Party: Samajwadi Party
- Spouse: Shobha Yadav
- Children: 4 sons and 3 daughters
- Education: University of Allahabad (L.L.B)

Jokhu Lal Yadav is an Indian politician from Samajwadi Party who has been MLA many times from Handia and Pratappur constituencies of Prayagraj District in Uttar Pradesh.

== Early life ==
Yadav was born on August 16, 1956, in Dubki Khurd village of Allahabad. His father's name is Ranga Bahadur Yadav, he married Shobha Yadav on February 22, 1978. He has four sons and three daughters.

== Political life ==
Yadav was involved in politics during his student life, he was elected as the general secretary of the Mathematics Council of the Allahabad University during 1979–1980. In the academic session 1980-1981, he was elected President of Students' Union of C.M.P. Degree College (a constituent College of University of Allahabad). He was elected member of the Legislative Assembly for the first time in support of the alliance of the Samajwadi Party and the Bahujan Samaj Party from the Handia Assembly constituency in the Uttar Pradesh Legislative Assembly Elections 1993, elected MLA for the second time in the year 1996, and for the third time in the year 2007 as a Samajwadi Party candidate from Pratappur. From 2003 to 2007, he was also a District President of Samajwadi Party Allahabad unit. Prior to this, he was also District President of Bahujan Samaj Party Allahabad unit from 1990 to 1994.
