= Jhusi Assembly constituency =

Former constituency of Uttar Pradesh, India

Jhusi
- Former constituency for the Uttar Pradesh Legislative Assembly

Constituency details
- Country: India
- Region: North India
- State: Uttar Pradesh
- District: Allahabad
- Established: 1974
- Abolished: 2012
- Reservation: None

Jhusi is a former constituency of the Uttar Pradesh Legislative Assembly, in the state of Uttar Pradesh, India. It was in Allahabad district, now called Prayagraj. The Delimitation Commission 2002 abolished Jhusi Legislative Assembly and created a new constituency as Phulpur Assembly constituency.

== Members of the Legislative Assembly ==
Election	Name	Party
1974	Vidya Dhar	Indian National Congress
1977	Keshari Nath Tripathi	Janata Party
1980	Baij Nath Prasad Kushwaha	Janata Party (Secular)
1985	Mahender Pratap Singh	Indian National Congress
1989	Mahender Pratap Singh	Janata Dal
1991	Mahender Pratap Singh	Janata Dal
1993	Jawahar Yadav (Pandit)	Samajwadi Party
1996	Vijama Yadav	Samajwadi Party
2002	Vijama Yadav	Samajwadi Party
2007	Praveen Patel	Bahujan Samaj Party
