= Pranjal Yadav =

Indian civil officer

- Born: Kanpur, Uttar Pradesh, India
- Education: B.Tech. degree in Mechanical Engineering
- Alma mater: IIT Roorkee
- Occupation(s): Special Secretary, National Integration Department, Govt. of U.P. Special Secretary, Medical Health & Family Welfare Deptt. + Additional Mission Director, NHM, UP LUCKNOW
- Years active: 2006–present
- Employer: Government of India
- Organization: Indian Administrative Service officer

Pranjal Yadav is an Indian Administrative Services officer who is the Special Secretary at the National Integration Department; Special Secretary, Medical Health & Family Welfare and Additional Mission Director, National Health Mission, Government of Uttar Pradesh.

== Education ==
He completed his B.Tech in mechanical engineering from IIT-Roorkee before getting into IAS in 2006.

== Career ==
In June 2007, he started his career as an assistant collector in Allahabad district and then went next to Siddharth Nagar sub-division as a joint collector. He was the Azamgarh DM before he was transferred to Varanasi. Yadav was appointed on 3 February 2013 in Kashi. He has worked against illegal occupation on the streets and for the protection of the Ganga river's historical Ghats.

== Controversies ==
Pranjal faced controversies over not allowing the prime ministerial candidate to hold a public rally. The Bharatiya Janata Party (BJP) Prime Ministerial candidate in Varanasi, Narendra Modi, has been a favorite of the locals despite not allowing the rally to be held in the sensitive Benia Bagh ground in 2014.
