= Phulpur Assembly constituency =

Constituency of the Uttar Pradesh legislative assembly in India

Coordinates: 25.55°N 82.09°E

Phulpur
- Constituency No. 256 for the Uttar Pradesh Legislative Assembly

Constituency details
- Country: India
- Region: North India
- State: Uttar Pradesh
- District: Prayagraj
- Total electors: 3,80,837 (2017)
- Reservation: None

Member of Legislative Assembly
- 18th Uttar Pradesh Legislative Assembly
- Incumbent Deepak Patel
- Party: BJP
- Elected year: 2024

Phulpur Assembly constituency is a constituency of the Uttar Pradesh Legislative Assembly covering the city of Phulpur in the Prayagraj district of Uttar Pradesh, India. The Delimitation Commission abolished the Jhusi Assembly constituency and in its place this new constituency came into existence in 2012.

Phulpur is one of five assembly constituencies in the Phulpur Lok Sabha constituency. Since 2008, this assembly constituency is numbered 256 amongst 403 constituencies.

== Members of Legislative Assembly ==
Year	Member	Party
Till 2012 : Constituency did not exist
2012	Sayeed Ahamad	Samajwadi Party
2017	Praveen Patel	Bharatiya Janata Party
2022	Praveen Patel	Bharatiya Janata Party
2024^	Deepak Patel	Bharatiya Janata Party

^ denotes by-election

== Election results ==
=== 2027 ===
2027 Uttar Pradesh Legislative Assembly election: Phulpur
Party	Candidate	Votes	%	±%
INDIA				
NDA				
BSP				
NOTA	None of the above			
Majority				
Turnout				
gain from		Swing		

=== 2024 bypoll ===
Uttar Pradesh Legislative Assembly by-election, 2024: Phulpur
Party	Candidate	Votes	%	±%
BJP	Deepak Patel	78,289	44.1	▲2.1
SP	Mohammad Mujtaba Siddiqui	66,984	37.73	▼3.16
BSP	Jitendra Kumar Singh	24,791	13.97	▲0.57
Azad samaj party	Shahid Khan	1,389	0.78	New
NOTA	None of the Above	1,145	0.65	▲0.02
Majority		11,305	6.37	▲5.26
Turnout		1,77,514	43.46	
BJP hold		Swing		

=== 2022 ===
2022 Uttar Pradesh Legislative Assembly election: Phulpur
Party	Candidate	Votes	%	±%
BJP	Praveen Patel	103,557	42.0	+0.06
SP	Mohammad Mujtaba Siddiqui	100,825	40.89	+10.84
BSP	Ram Tolan Yadav	33,036	13.4	−9.12
NOTA	None of the above	1,548	0.63	−0.1
Majority		2,732	1.11	−10.78
Turnout		246,588	60.32	+1.52
BJP hold		Swing		

=== 2017 ===
Bharatiya Janta Party candidate Praveen Patel won in 2017 Uttar Pradesh Legislative Elections defeating Samajwadi Party candidate Mansoor Alam by a margin of 26,613 votes.

2017 Uttar Pradesh Legislative Assembly Election: Phulpu
Party	Candidate	Votes	%	±%
BJP	Praveen Patel	93,912	41.94	
SP	Mansoor Alam	67,299	30.05	
BSP	Mohammad Masroor Shaikh	50,421	22.52	
Independent	Ram Kishun Patel	2,048	0.91	
NOTA	None of the above	1,614	0.73	
Majority		26,613	11.89	
Turnout		223,933	58.8	

=== 2012 ===
- Sayeed Ahamad (SP) : 72,898 votes
- Praveen Patel (BSP) : 64,998

=== 1977 ===
- Padmakar (JNP) : 27,238 votes
- Abul Kalam (INC) : 19,317

=== 1962 ===
- Muzaffar Hasan (INC) : 21,560 votes
- Amar Singh (Jana Sangh) : 7,232
