= Muzaffar Hasan =

Indian politician

Member Uttar Pradesh Legislative Assembly
- In office 1952–1969
- Constituency: Chail,phulpur, Pratappur and Nawabganj in Prayagraj

Personal details
- Born: Allahabad, Uttar Pradesh, India
- Party: Indian National Congress Party, Janata Party
- Profession: Politician

Muzaffar Hasan (born 22 July 1902) was an Indian nationalist leader from Uttar Pradesh, serving Indian National Congress or Congress Party organization at city level, alongside Pandit Jawaharlal Nehru, in Allahabad. As a party worker, he took part in protest rallies against British rule, facing police action with imprisonment in jail, many times, between 1920 and 1947. Muzaffar Hasan served as minister in Uttar Pradesh government of Congress party (1952 - 1969).

== Early life ==
Muzaffar Hasan was born on 22 August 1902 in Allahabad district, Uttar Pradesh. His father's name was Shah Haider Hasan who shared relationship with people from the historic Sayyid and Shaikh families in Allahabad Division. He learned basic Arabic, Farsi and Urdu books from his local teachers in Phulpur, Allahabad at an early age. He was too young to participate actively in the Indian Home Rule movement and Khilafat movement against British rule in the early 1900s. Later from 1920 to 1947, as a member of Congress party, he participated in satyagraha, a kind of non-violent, but mass-based civil disobedience, aimed at complete independence from British rule promoted by Mohandas Gandhi.

== Political life ==
Muzaffar Hasan was elected city president of Indian National Congress Party after the predecessor president:Pandit Jawaharlal Nehru, with Radhey Shyam as Secretary in Allahabad (1936). In addition he was a member of state Assembly and Parliamentary Board. Allahabad Congress party under him as the new president (1936-1946) achieved provincial elections as a result of Government of India Act 1935 in 1936 and 1946 Indian provincial elections. The Congress party won majority seats in Uttar Pradesh in these elections including seats in Allahabad. The election success of Congress Party in Uttar Pradesh along with other states in 1946, saw the party win majority in Constituent Assembly of India where the decision to make Dominion of India, independence from British rule, took place, 1947.

Muzaffar Hasan became a member of Uttar Pradesh Legislative Assembly, MLA, by winning Chail Allahabad seat, in first general election held after Independence, 1952. His presence as a top Congress party leader, together with Nirmal Chandra Chaturvedi, MLC, influenced the Party not only to get majority status but also working of the party in the state, in particular, the election of Chandra Bhanu Gupta as Chief Minister of Uttar Pradesh (1960) due to resignation of former chief minister Sampurnanand in the post G.B. Pant era. He served two terms MLA from Congress party, winning Uttar Pradesh Legislative Assembly election from Phulpur (1962) and Pratappur (1967). In addition, he served as minister including transportation in the Government of Uttar Pradesh continuously from 1952 to 1969. The political career of Muzaffar Hasan was summarized in a book 'Meri Siyasi Sarguzisht' and was reviewed separately and with other senior leaders in Congress Party. These publications contained information to know much of his noteworthy achievements aimed at the success of party in state elections or well-being of people in general, among others, in Uttar Pradesh (1936 - 1980).

Muzaffar Hasan did not win a seat in Allahabad, 1969 and 1974 elections, but he won Nawabganj, Allahabad Assembly constituency as a Janata Party member, 1977.

== Retirement life and death ==
Muzaffar Hasan ended his political life in 1980. He spent much of time writing books in Urdu on subjects including politics and his family history. He died in the early 2000s in Allahabad.
