= Keshari Devi Patel =

Indian politician

Member of Parliament, Lok Sabha
- In office 23 May 2019 – June 2024
- Preceded by: Nagendra Pratap Singh Patel
- Succeeded by: Praveen Patel
- Constituency: Phulpur

Personal details
- Born: 1 January 1957 (age 69) Dabwa Khandeha, Uttar Pradesh, India
- Party: Bharatiya Janata Party
- Other political affiliations: Bahujan Samaj Party
- Spouse: Gulab Singh (m. 1973)
- Children: 3
- Education: Awadhesh Pratap Singh University (MA)

Keshari Devi Patel is an Indian politician. She was elected to the Lok Sabha, the lower house of the Parliament of India from Phulpur, Uttar Pradesh in the 2019 Indian general election as a member of the Bharatiya Janata Party. Earlier, she had lost the 2004 Lok Sabha election from Phulpur and the 2014 Lok Sabha election from Prayagraj as a Bahujan Samaj Party candidate. Later she joined the BJP.

== Personal life ==
Keshari Devi was born to Hanuman Das Singh and Dhanpati Devi on 1 January 1957 in Dabwa Khandeha village of Chitrakoot district, Uttar Pradesh. She did her Master of Arts post graduation at Awadhesh Pratap Singh University in Rewa, Madhya Pradesh. She married Gulab Singh on 17 February 1973, with whom she has three sons.
