= Vidhya Yadav =

Indian cricket administrator and manager

Vidhya Yadav is a cricket administrator from India. She was the manager for the India national women's cricket team that participated in the 2010 Women's Twenty20 International World Cup. She was also part of the Women's Cricket Committee of the Board of Control for Cricket in India.
