= Harshvardhan Bajpai =

Indian politician

Member of Uttar Pradesh Legislative Assembly
- Incumbent
- Assumed office 2017
- Preceded by: Anugrah Narayan Singh
- Constituency: Allahabad North (Assembly constituency)

Personal details
- Party: Bharatiya Janata Party
- Occupation: Politician, Businessperson
- Profession: Engineer

Harshvardhan Bajpai is an Indian politician from the Bharatiya Janata Party. He is active in politics since 2007. Before joining BJP he was in the Bahujan Samaj Party. He is a one-time Member of the Legislative Assembly from Allahabad North Assembly constituency in Allahabad of Uttar Pradesh.
