= Baba Ram Adhar Yadav =

Indian politician

Baba Ram Adhar Yadav was an Indian politician who served as the MLA in the Uttar Pradesh Legislative Assembly from the Allahabad North constituency.

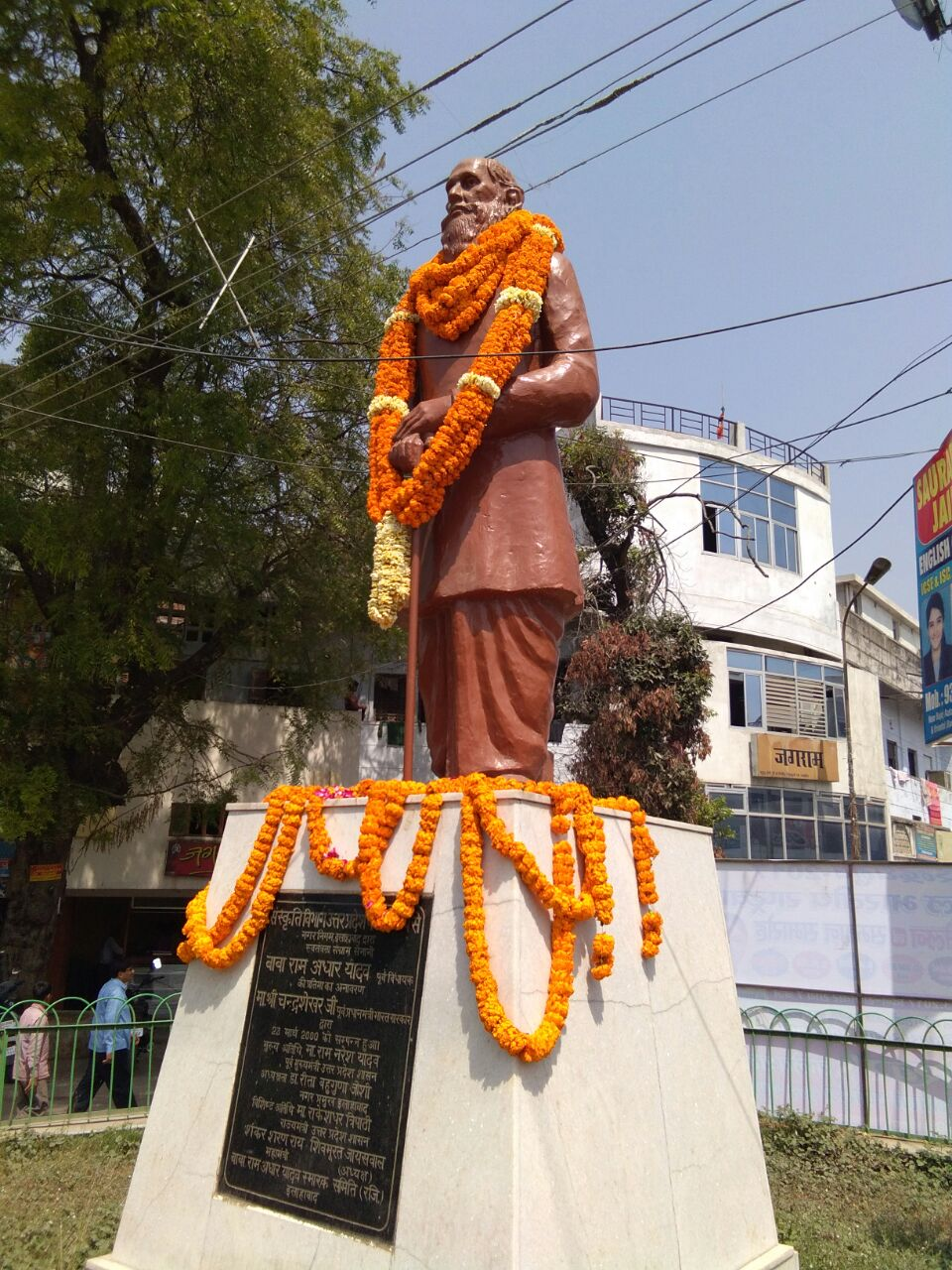

Ram Adhar was born on 23 March 1901 in a modest farmer family. His father was Shri Chaturi Lal. Ram Adhar participated in the Indian Independence movement as a child, when he joined the "Banar Sena", a child wing of the Indian National Congress.

Baba Ram Adhar was a founder member of Janata Party. He won the MLA elections in 1977 against Rajendra Kumari Bajpayee of Congress from Allahabad by a large margin. During his election campaign, all the supporters used to conduct cycle rallies and foot marches. Most popular slogan chanted was, "Baba ji ki kya pehchan, Lambi dadhi, Muh mein Paan". Post-Emergency he started losing interest in active politics, and moved towards social activism and philanthropy.

Baba Rama Adhar died on 21 November 1996. Posthumously, the State Government established his Statue at Jagram Churaha (Near Lower Court) Allahabad and "Baba Ram Adhar Yadav Smarak Samiti" was also formed by his family and followers. Siddhart, one of his grandchildren has created an archive preserving the old memories of Baba Ram Adhar Yadav.
