= Kapil Muni Karwariya =

Indian politician

Member of Parliament, Lok Sabha
- In office 16 May 2009 – 15 May 2014
- Preceded by: Atique Ahmed
- Succeeded by: Keshav Prasad Maurya
- Constituency: Phulpur

Personal details
- Born: 2 March 1967 (age 59). Chakthama, Kaushambi, (Uttar Pradesh).
- Citizenship: India
- Party: Bahujan Samaj Party (from 2008 to 2014, expelled from party for anti party activities), Bharatiya Janata Party (before 2008).
- Spouse: Mrs. Kalpana Karwariya.
- Children: 1 son (Achintya Karwariya) & 2 daughters (Meenakshi Karwariya, Pratibha Misr w/o Rajesh Misr).
- Education: Allahabad University & University of Lucknow.
- Profession: Social Worker, Advocate & Politician.
- Committees: Committee on Defense (Member).

Kapil Muni Karwariya is an Indian Politician who was a member of the 15th Lok Sabha of India from 2009 to 2014. He represented the Phulpur (Lok Sabha constituency) of Uttar Pradesh as a member of the Bahujan Samaj Party political party.

== Education ==
Shri Kapil Muni holds LL.B. degree in 1990 from Lucknow University, Uttar Pradesh. He was an advocate by profession before entering into political world. He married Kalpana Karwariya, from a Hindu Brahmin family.

== Life imprisonment ==
A court in Prayagraj sentenced former BSP MP Kapil Muni Karwariya, his brothers Uday Bhan Karwariya and Suraj Bhan Karwariya and their uncle Ram Chandra to life imprisonment for the murder of then Samajwadi Party MLA Jawahar Yadav (Pandit) 23 years ago.

== Posts held ==
| # | From | To | Position |
|---|---|---|---|
| 01 | 2000 | 2005 | President, District. Panchayat, Kaushambi, Uttar Pradesh |
| 02 | 2009 | 2014 | BSP's Member of Parliament from Phulpur Constituency, Uttar Pradesh |
| 03 | 2009 | - | Member, Committee on Defense |

== See also ==
- List of members of the 15th Lok Sabha of India
- Politics of India
- Parliament of India
- Government of India
