= Raj Vir Singh Yadav =

Indian surgeon (1937–2006)

- Born: 27 July 1937; Badaun, Uttar Pradesh, India
- Died: 4 February 2006 (aged 68)
- Occupation: Surgeon
- Known for: Kidney transplants

R.V.S. Yadav was born on 27 July 1937 in Nauliharnathpur (District Budaun), Uttar Pradesh, India. He was awarded the MBBS in 1961 and the MS (Surgery) in 1964 respectively from the King George's Medical College, Lucknow University, Lucknow. He received the FICS (General Surgery) in 1974 from the International College of Surgeons and the FACS (General Surgery) in 1977 from the American College of Surgeons.

Yadav performed the first kidney transplant in India at the Post Graduate Institute of Medical Education & Research (PGIMER) at Chandigarh in 1973. He was the first transplant surgeon to be by honoured by Indira Gandhi with the Padma Shri award in 1982. He was honorary surgeon to three consecutive Presidents, Dr. Neelam Sanjeeva Reddi, Gyani Zail Singh and R. Venkataraman.

Yadav was honoured with the establishment of the Raj Vir Singh Yadav Foundation, which aims to support medical and scientific education, awareness, research and practice. It offers and supports socio-economic assistance, development, and general welfare and empowerment of the Indian societies.
