= Masuriya Din =

Indian politician

Masuriya Deen Pasi (born 2 October 1911) was an Indian politician, a fighter for independence who served as a member of the Uttar Pradesh Legislative Assembly, the Constituent Assembly of India, the Provisional Parliament, and the first four Indian parliaments.

Masuriya Din Pasi (मसूरिया दीन पासी) was born in Jondhval, Prayagraj. He belonged to Hindu Pasi community. He was educated at the Government Normal School in Prayagraj. A businessman, he took part in the Indian independence movement, taking part against the criminal tribe act and was imprisoned several times between 1932 and 1944. He was a member of the Uttar Pradesh Legislative Assembly from 1946 to 1952, while also serving in the National Constituent Assembly and its successor, the Provisional Parliament. He was then elected to the first, second, third and 4th Lok Sabha, where he represented Phulpur and later Chail seats in Uttar Pradesh. He was a member of the Indian National Congress.

He was married to Laxmi Devi; they had 11 children.
