= Nagendra Pratap Singh Patel =

Indian politician

Member of Parliament, Lok Sabha
- In office 14 March 2018 – 23 May 2019
- Preceded by: Keshav Prasad Maurya
- Succeeded by: Keshari Devi Patel
- Constituency: Phulpur

Personal details
- Born: 7 October 1968 (age 57) Allahabad, Uttar Pradesh, India
- Party: Apna Dal (Soneylal) (since February 2022); Samajwadi Party (until February 2022)
- Children: 4
- Parent: Sushila Devi (mother)

Nagendra Pratap Singh Patel is an Indian politician and former Member of Parliament from Phulpur Lok Sabha constituency in Prayagraj district, Uttar Pradesh.

Lok Sabha
Preceded by Keshav Prasad Maurya	Member of Parliament for Phulpur; 2018–2019	Succeeded by Keshari Devi Patel
