= Sahason =

Village in Uttar Pradesh, India

Sahason is a Market in Prayagraj, Uttar Pradesh, India.
