= Hate speech in India =

Hate speech in India is the use of language or actions that promote discrimination, hostility, or hatred against individuals or groups based on their identities, such as religion, caste, ethnicity, gender, sexual orientation, or political affiliation. India's diverse population of over 1.3 billion people and complex social and political landscape make it vulnerable to hate speech and incitement to violence, which have become increasingly prominent in recent years.

== Legal framework ==
India has laws, including the Indian Penal Code (IPC) and the Code of Criminal Procedure (CrPC), to address hate speech, but these laws are criticized for their lack of clarity and inadequate enforcement. Acts that could promote enmity between different groups on religious grounds and insult religious beliefs are prohibited by law. However, there is no legal definition of hate speech in India. The Law Commission of India recommended adding separate provisions to the IPC to criminalize hate speech in 2017, but some legal experts have raised concerns that these amendments could be misused to curtail legitimate speech and expression.

=== Enforcement challenges ===
The judiciary in India has been hesitant to impose restrictions on free speech, and hate speech cases have not been acted upon in most instances. The police and other law enforcement agencies have also faced criticism for their inability to investigate and prosecute cases of hate speech and incitement to violence.

== Reports ==
Incidents of Hate Speech Against Religious Minorities in India (2024)

The United States-based think tank India Hate Lab (IHL) published research revealing extremely elevated levels of hate speech against Indian religious minorities, especially Muslims and Christians, in 2024. According to the IHL report, incidents of hate speech surged by 74%, from 668 cases in 2023 to 1,165 cases in 2024. The majority of these incidents targeted Muslims, with Christians also being affected. Much of the hate speech occurred during political rallies and religious gatherings, with high-profile figures, including Prime Minister Narendra Modi, accused of fueling divisive rhetoric.

== Impact of social media and television ==
Social media and television channels have contributed to the rise of hate speech in India, with politicians and public figures using these platforms to gain media attention and disseminate hate speech. Social media platforms like Facebook's Indian subsidiary, Meta, and Twitter have also faced criticism for their content moderation practices in India.

=== Meta's Human Rights Impact Assessment ===
Meta commissioned a Human Rights Impact Assessment on India in 2019 to evaluate its role in spreading hate speech and incitement to violence. However, the report has been criticized for deflecting blame and not addressing the root causes of hate speech in India. Civil society groups argue that the report was designed to deflect criticism rather than address the problem.
