= Allahabad North Assembly constituency =

Constituency of the Uttar Pradesh legislative assembly in India

Coordinates: 25.48°N 81.84°E

Allahabad North
- Constituency No. 262 for the Uttar Pradesh Legislative Assembly

Constituency details
- Country: India
- Region: North India
- State: Uttar Pradesh
- District: Prayagraj
- Total electors: 4,13,478 (2018)
- Reservation: None

Member of Legislative Assembly
- 18th Uttar Pradesh Legislative Assembly
- Incumbent Harshvardhan Bajpai
- Party: Bharatiya Janta Party
- Elected year: 2022
- Preceded by: Anugrah Narayan Singh

Allahabad North is a constituency of the Uttar Pradesh Legislative Assembly in the city of Prayagraj of Uttar Pradesh, India.

Allahabad North is one of five assembly constituencies in the Phulpur Lok Sabha constituency. Since 2008, this assembly constituency is numbered 262 amongst 403 constituencies.

Currently this seat belongs to Bharatiya Janta Party candidate Harshvardhan Bajpai who won in last Assembly election of 2017 Uttar Pradesh Legislative Elections defeating Indian National Congress candidate Anugrah Narayan Singh by a margin of 35,025 votes.

== Members of Legislative Assembly ==
Year	Member	Party
1957	Kailash Narain Gupta	Indian National Congress
1962	Rajendra Kumari Bajpai	Indian National Congress
1967	Rajendra Kumari Bajpai	Indian National Congress
1969	Rajendra Kumari Bajpai	Indian National Congress
1974	Rajendra Kumari Bajpai	Indian National Congress
1977	Baba Ram Adhar Yadav	Janata Party
1980	Ashok Kumar Bajpai	Indian National Congress (I)
1985	Anugrah Narayan Singh	Lokdal
1989	Anugrah Narayan Singh	Janata Dal
1991	Narendra Kumar Singh Gaur	Bharatiya Janata Party
1993	Narendra Kumar Singh Gaur	Bharatiya Janata Party
1996	Narendra Kumar Singh Gaur	Bharatiya Janata Party
2002	Narendra Kumar Singh Gaur	Bharatiya Janata Party
2007	Anugrah Narayan Singh	Indian National Congress
2012	Anugrah Narayan Singh	Indian National Congress
2017	Harshvardhan Bajpai	Bharatiya Janata Party
2022	Harshvardhan Bajpai	Bharatiya Janata Party

== Election results ==
=== 2027 ===
2027 Uttar Pradesh Legislative Assembly election: Allahabad
Party	Candidate	Votes	%	±%
INDIA				
NDA				
BSP				
NOTA	None of the above			
Majority				
Turnout				
gain from		Swing		

=== 2022 ===
2022 Uttar Pradesh Legislative Assembly election: Allahabad North
Party	Candidate	Votes	%	±%
BJP	Harshvardhan Bajpai	96,890	55.07	▲3.59
SP	Sandeep Yadav	42,007	23.88	
INC	Anugrah Narayan Singh	23,571	13.4	▼17.87
BSP	Sanjay Goswami	9,614	5.46	▼8.04
NOTA	None of the above	919	0.52	▲0.14
Majority		54,883	31.19	▲10.98
Turnout		175,941	39.77	▼2.13
BJP hold		Swing		

=== 2017 ===
2017 Uttar Pradesh Legislative Assembly election
Party	Candidate	Votes	%	±%
BJP	Harshvardhan Bajpai	89,191	51.48	
INC	Anugrah Narayan Singh	54,166	31.27	
BSP	Amit Srivastava	23,388	13.5	
NOTA	None of the above	659	0.38	
Majority		35,025	20.21	
Turnout		173,242	41.9	
BJP gain from INC		Swing		
