= Sidharth Nath Singh =

Indian politician

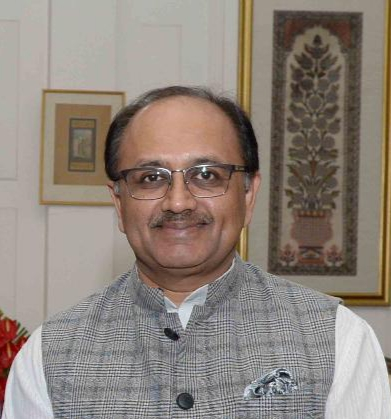
- Singh (right) in 2018

Minister of Khadi & Village Industries, Sericulture, Textile, MSME Government of Uttar Pradesh
- In office 21 August 2019 – 25 March 2022
- Chief Minister: Yogi Adityanath
- Preceded by: Satish Mahana
- Succeeded by: Rakesh Sachan

Minister of Health & Family Welfare Government of Uttar Pradesh
- In office 19 March 2017 – 21 August 2019
- Chief Minister: Yogi Adityanath
- Succeeded by: Jai Pratap Singh

Member of Uttar Pradesh Legislative Assembly
- Incumbent
- Assumed office 11 March 2017
- Preceded by: Pooja Pal
- Constituency: Allahabad West

Personal details
- Born: 1 October 1963 (age 63) Delhi, India
- Party: Bharatiya Janata Party
- Spouse: Dr. Neeta Singh
- Relations: Lal Bahadur Shastri (Grandfather)
- Children: Two sons
- Education: B. A. (from St. Hindu College, Delhi)

Sidharth Nath Singh (born 1 October 1963) is an Indian politician and the former Cabinet Minister in the Government of Uttar Pradesh. He is one of the official spokespersons of the Bharatiya Janata Party. He is a grandson of former Prime Minister of India Lal Bahadur Shastri. Suman Shastri (1936-2002), his mother, was the daughter of Lal Bahadur Shastri. He is BJP state in-charge of Andhra Pradesh and co-in-charge of West Bengal. He is also serving as a Bharatiya Janata Party National Secretary.

== Political career ==
S. N. Singh became Member of the Uttar Pradesh Legislative Assembly from Allahabad West constituency in 2017 by defeating two-time BSP MLA Pooja Pal by 45,000 votes. He is currently (since 2017) a cabinet minister in the UP government, with the portfolio of Health.
