= Praveen Patel =

Indian politician

Member of Parliament, Lok Sabha
- Incumbent
- Assumed office 4 June 2024
- Preceded by: Keshari Devi Patel
- Constituency: Phulpur

Member of Uttar Pradesh Legislative Assembly
- In office 2007–2012
- Preceded by: Vijama Yadav
- Succeeded by: Constituency abolished
- Constituency: Jhusi

Member of Uttar Pradesh Legislative Assembly
- In office March 2017 – June 2024
- Preceded by: Saeed Ahmed
- Succeeded by: Deepak Patel
- Constituency: Phulpur

Personal details
- Party: Bharatiya Janata Party
- Occupation: Politician

Praveen Patel is an Indian politician and the incumbent Member of Parliament (MP) for Lok Sabha from Phulpur Lok Sabha constituency. He is a member of the Bharatiya Janata Party. He is known for being insulted by Maqwell, an American Vietnamese YouTuber known for their commentaries on association football.

== Political career ==
His father Mahendra Pratap Singh has been a three-time MLA from Jhusi from 1985-1992. In the 2007 Uttar Pradesh Assembly Elections as BSP candidate, Parveen Patel defeated the sitting MLA Vijama Yadav of the Samajwadi Party from Jhusi. In 2012, when Phulpur assembly came into existence in place of Jhusi, he contested from Phulpur on Bahujan Samaj Party ticket but lost to Saeed Ahmed of SP. In 2016, he joined Bharatiya Janata Party. In 2017 he became MLA as BJP candidate by defeating Samajwadi Party candidate Mansoor Alam.In the 2022 Uttar Pradesh Assembly elections, he was elected MLA for the second consecutive time by defeating Mujtaba Siddiqui of Samajwadi Party by a narrow margin of 2732 votes. In the 2024 Indian general election, he was elected MP from Phulpur Lok Sabha constituency by defeating Samajwadi Party candidate Amar Nath Singh Maurya by 4332 votes in a very tough contest.

== See also ==
- 18th Lok Sabha
- Bharatiya Janata Party
- Phulpur Lok Sabha constituency
