= Pratappur, Uttar Pradesh Assembly constituency =

Constituency of the Uttar Pradesh legislative assembly in India

Coordinates: 25.39°N 82.30°E

Pratappur
- Constituency No. 257 for the Uttar Pradesh Legislative Assembly

Constituency details
- Country: India
- Region: North India
- State: Uttar Pradesh
- District: Prayagraj
- Total electors: 4,06,567
- Reservation: None

Member of Legislative Assembly
- 18th Uttar Pradesh Legislative Assembly
- Incumbent Vijama Yadav
- Party: Samajwadi Party
- Elected year: 2022

Pratappur is a constituency of the Uttar Pradesh Legislative Assembly comprising parts of Handia and Phulpur tehsils in Prayagraj district of Uttar Pradesh, India. It is one of five assembly constituencies in the Bhadohi Lok Sabha constituency. As of 2022 it is represented by Vijama Yadav of the Samajwadi Party.

== Members of the Legislative Assembly ==
Election	Name	Party
2007	Jokhu Lal Yadav	Samajwadi Party
2012	Vijama Yadav	Samajwadi Party
2017	Mohd. Mujtaba Siddqui	Bahujan Samaj Party
2022	Vijama Yadav	Samajwadi Party

== Election results ==
=== 2027 ===
2027 Uttar Pradesh Legislative Assembly election: Pratappur
Party	Candidate	Votes	%	±%
INDIA				
NDA				
BSP				
NOTA	None of the above			
Majority				
Turnout				
gain from		Swing		

=== 2022 ===
2022 Uttar Pradesh Legislative Assembly election: Pratappur
Party	Candidate	Votes	%	±%
SP	Vijama Yadav	91,142	40.09	+15.22
AD(S)	Rakeshdhar Tripathi	80,186	35.27	+4.38
BSP	Ghanshyam Pandey	34,912	15.36	−16.81
Jan Adhikar Party	Manju Maurya	3,106	1.37	
INC	Sanjay Tiwari	2,971	1.31	
PECP	Mohd Ahmad Ansari	2,143	0.94	
NOTA	None of the above	654	0.29	−1.13
Majority		10,956	4.82	+3.54
Turnout		227,363	55.92	+0.49
SP gain from BSP		Swing		

=== 2017 ===
2017 Uttar Pradesh Legislative Assembly Election: Pratappur
Party	Candidate	Votes	%	±%
BSP	Mohd. Mujtaba Siddqui	66,805	32.17	
AD(S)	Karan Singh	64,151	30.89	
SP	Vijama Yadav	51,645	24.87	
Independent	Santosh Yadav Army	7,264	3.5	
Independent	Dr. K. L.Patel	4,658	2.24	
Sarv Sambhaav Party	Pushpraj Singh	2,020	0.97	
NOTA	None of the above	2,916	1.42	
Majority		2,654	1.28	
Turnout		207,673	55.43	

=== 2012 ===
2012 Uttar Pradesh Legislative Assembly election: Pratappur
Party	Candidate	Votes	%	±%
SP	Vijama Yadav	62,582	34.18	
BSP	Mohd. Mujtaba Siddiqi	49,774	27.18	
INC	Shyam Surat Upadhyay	24,990	13.65	
AD	Durvijay Singh Patel	22,808	12.46	
Majority		12,808	7.00	
Turnout		182,919	57.42	

=== 2007 ===
2007 Uttar Pradesh Legislative Assembly election: Pratappur
Party	Candidate	Votes	%	±%
SP	Jokhu Lal Yadav	41,454	30.54	
BSP	Sayeed Ahmad	34,697	25.56	
INC	Shyam Surat Upadhyay	23,149	17.06	
AD	Shyam Lal Pal	22,103	16.29	
Majority		6,757	4.98	
Turnout		135,731		
