= Surekha Yadav =

India's first female train driver

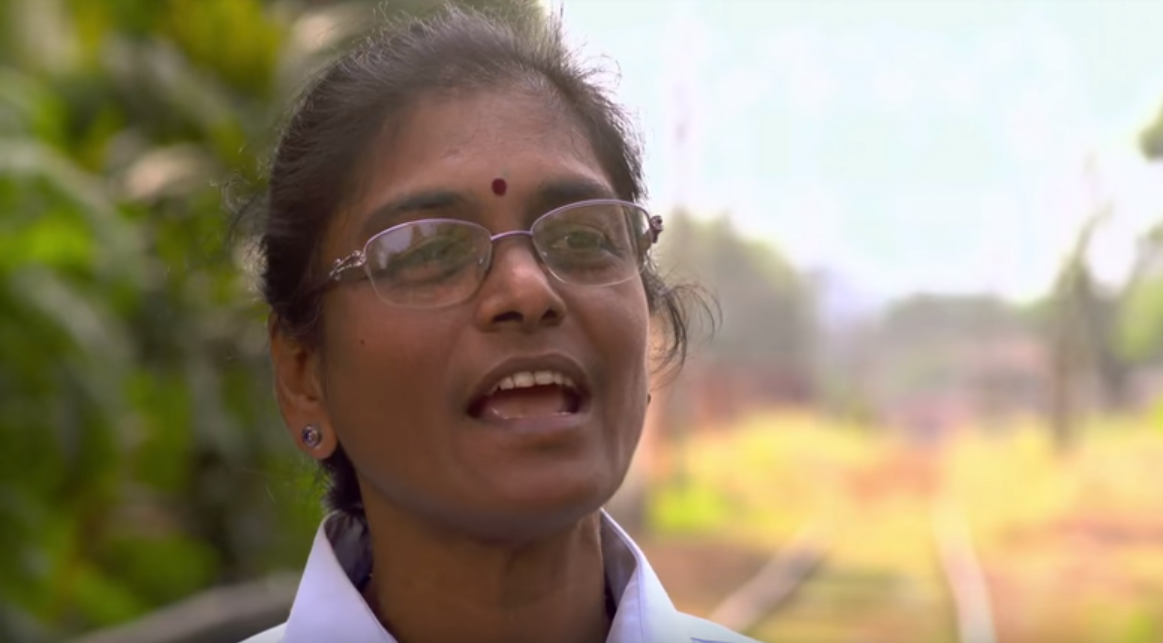
- Born: Surekha R. Bhosale; Satara, Maharashtra, India
- Years active: 1988-2025
- Employer(s): Indian Railways, CSTM, Central Railway.
- Known for: India's first female (locopilot) train driver
- Spouse: Shankar Yadav
- Children: 2
- Parent(s): Sonabai & Ramchandra Bhosale

Surekha Shankar Yadav née Surekha Ramchandra Bhosale is the senior-most female locopilot (train driver) at the Indian Railways. She became India's first female train driver in 1988. She drove the first "Ladies Special" local train for Central Railways when it was first introduced in the four metro cities by Mamata Banerjee, the then Railway Minister, in April 2000. She was suburban local train motor woman from 2000 to 2010. She then got promoted to Sr. Loco Pilot Mail in 2010. A momentous event in her career was on 8 March 2011, on the International Women's Day, when she became Asia's first woman train driver to drive the Deccan Queen from Pune to CST, through difficult but scenic topography, where she was greeted by the then Mayor of Mumbai Shraddha Jadhav, at CST, the headquarter of Central Railway zone. She repeated the feat ten years later driving an all-woman crew from Mumbai to Lucknow. A commonly heard comment in 2011 was that "Women don't drive railway engines".

== Early life ==
Surekha was born in Satara in Maharashtra to Sonabai and Ramchandra Bhosale. Her father, late Ramchandra Bhosale, was a farmer; she is the eldest of his five children. She had initial schooling at Saint Paul Convent High School, Satara. After completion of schooling, she took admission for vocation training and then studied for a Diploma in Electrical Engineering from the Government Polytechnic at Karad in the Satara district of western Maharashtra. She wanted to continue her college studies to get graduate degrees of Bachelor of Science (B.Sc.) in mathematics and Bachelor of Education (B.Ed.) to become a teacher, but a job opportunity in the Indian Railways put an end to her further studies.

== Professional life ==
Surekha Bhosale was interviewed by the Railway Recruitment Board, Mumbai in 1987. She was selected and joined the Central Railway as a trainee assistant driver in 1986 at the Kalyan Training School, where she trained for six months. She became a regular assistant driver in 1989. The first local goods train that she piloted was numbered L-50, which runs between Wadi Bunder and Kalyan, when she was assigned the task of checking the running condition of the train's engine, the signals and all related works. She was then assigned to work as a goods train driver in 1996. In 1998, she became a full-fledged goods train driver. In 2010, she became a ghat driver on the Western Ghat railway line. She was Asia's first motorwoman to pilot Deccan Queen. For driving a “ghat loco”, in the ghat (hill) section of the Western Ghats, she received special training to run the twin-engined passenger trains that negotiate the hills of western Maharashtra. She said that "Because I was the only woman, they were curious whether I could do it or not". As an assistant driver, she drove shunters. She was promoted to motor-woman in 2000. In this capacity her occupying motorman's cabin in the train attracted attention and there were admirers seeking her autograph. In May 2011, she was promoted to express mail driver. At one time she taught in the Driver's Training Centre (DTC) Kalyan as a senior instructor.

When Surekha Bhosale joined service with the Indian Railways, she realized that she was the first woman to drive a railway train in India, which until then was totally a male bastion. Other women were inspired by her, and as of 2011 there were 50 women locomotive drivers who were operating suburban trains and goods trains, and also as shunters or assistant drivers. To pursue a career as train driver in Mumbai, she said that she received full support from her family, friends and colleagues and has not experienced any discrimination as a woman. She is dedicated to run trains safely with full presence of mind, as the risks faced could be in the form of breakdowns due to mechanical problems, chain-pulling, rasta rokos (a form of protest in India to stop trains or block roads), and people or animals crossing the track suddenly, which need right thinking, prompt and quick action. She has no record of train accidents. She has so far driven many types of trains, such as local suburban trains, ghat trains with twin engines (hill section train on the Western Ghat), goods and mail express trains, and she works for ten hours a day. Her ambition is to drive a long-distance passenger train. She has also participated in activities to check eve-teasing.

In 1991, Yadav acted in a television serial, Hum Bhi Kisise Kum Nahi (we are second to none). She has received praise from several organisations for her role as a woman train driver.

In 2021, she drove a special train from Mumbai to Lucknow with an all-woman crew to celebrate International Women's Day.

On Monday, 13 March 2023, she was the first woman to drive the semi-high-speed Vande Bharat Express train; she drove it from Solapur to Chhatrapati Shivaji Terminus, covering a distance of 455 kilometers.

On Tuesday, 14 March 2023, Surekha took the Vande Bharat from CSMT to Solapur.

On Sunday, 26 March 2023, PM Narendra Modi mentioned Surekha Yadav in his 99th episode of Mann ki Baat, appreciating her for being the first lady to drive the Make In India Vande Bharat Train 18, along with being first in every other category in her long service.

On Thursday, 18 September 2025, a farewell function and lunch was held on CSMT railway station premises, after Yadav piloted the Rajdhani Express (22222, Hazrat Nizamuddin–CSMT) from Igatpuri, marking one of her last assignments. (Reference: Times of India, dated: 20 September 2025).

On the same evening of 18th September at 07.34 pm, Central Railway posted from its official Twitter account as "Smt. Surekha Yadav, Asia’s First Woman Train Driver, will retire on 30th September after 36 glorious years of service. A true trailblazer, she broke barriers, inspired countless women, and proved that no dream is beyond reach. Her journey will forever remain a symbol of women empowerment in Indian Railways."

On Friday, 19 September 2025, however, it was not just the Central Railway and its staff members who congratulated the first woman locomotive pilot. Mahindra Group Chairman Anand Mahindra took to his X (formerly Twitter) account to congratulate Yadav for "being a pioneer". His tweet read, “Congratulations on being a pioneer, Surekha ji. And my best wishes upon your retirement after such a long career of serving the people. Thank you for reminding us today, that iconic change makers like you must be celebrated and your contributions never forgotten,” Mahindra wrote on his official X handle at 02.43 pm.

On Tuesday, 30 September 2025, she retired at the age of 60, after 36+ years of a long service career.

== Personal life ==
She got married in 1990 to Shankar Yadav, who is a police inspector in the Government of Maharashtra. They have two sons.

== Awards received ==
- Jijau puraskar (1998)
- Women achievers award (2001) (by lions)
- Rashtriya mahila aayog, delhi (2001)
- Lokmat sakhi manch (2002)
- S.B.I. Platinum jubilee year celebrations (2003-2004)
- Sahyadri hirkani award (2004)
- Prerna puraskar (2005)
- G.M.award (2011)
- Woman achievers award (2011) (by central railway)
- RWCC Best Women award of year 2013. For first lady locopilot on Indian Railways on date 5 April 2013
- GM award for first lady locopilot on Indian Railways. April 2011

== Bibliography ==
- Book (2006). Limca Book of Records. Bisleri Beverages Limited.
- Hanshaw, Brigitta Natasha (1 September 2003). The World Through Our Eyes: A Collaboration of Essays by International Students. iUniverse. ISBN 978-0-595-28831-1.
- Rights (2001). Documentation on Women, Children & Human Rights. Sandarbhini, Library and Documentation Centre, All India Association for Christian Higher Education.
