= Phulpur, Prayagraj =

Town Area in Uttar Pradesh, India

- Town Area
- Nickname: Nehru's Constituency
- Location of Phulpur in Prayagraj, Uttar Pradesh Phulpur, Prayagraj (India)
- Coordinates: 25.55°N 82.10°E
- Country: India
- State: Uttar Pradesh
- District: Prayagraj

Government
  - Type: Nagar Panchayat
  - Body: Phulpur Nagar Panchayat
  - Chairman: Amarnath Yadav ([[BHARTIYA JANTA PARTY |BJP])
  - MP: Praveen Patel (BJP)
  - MLA: Deepak patel (BJP)

Area
  - Total: 15.8 km^{2} (6.1 sq mi)
- Elevation: 87 m (285 ft)

Population (2001)
  - Total: 21,066
  - Density: 1,330/km^{2} (3,450/sq mi)

Language
  - Official: Hindi
  - Additional official: Urdu
- Time zone: UTC+5:30 (IST)
- PIN: 212402
- Telephone Code: +91-5332
- Vehicle registration: UP 70

Phulpur is a town area in Prayagraj district in the Indian state of Uttar Pradesh. It is known for being the Lok Sabha seat from which Jawaharlal Nehru got elected to the Indian Parliament. Phulpur also hosts a Vidhan Sabha seat.

== Geography ==
Phulpur is located at 25°33′N 82°06′E / 25.55°N 82.10°E / 25.55; 82.10.[1] It has an average elevation of 87 metres (285 ft). The IST (Indian standard time) is calculated from Phulpur.

== Demographics ==
As of 2001 India census, Phulpur had a population of 21,066. Males constitute 54% of the population and females 46%. Phulpur has an average literacy rate of 60%, higher than the national average of 59.5%: male literacy is 70%, and female literacy is 49%. In Phulpur, 17% of the population is under 6 years of age.
