= Jyoti Yadav =

Indian cricketer (born 1977)

Personal information
- Full name: Jyoti Prasad Yadav
- Born: 26 September 1977 (age 49); Allahabad, Uttar Pradesh, India
- Batting: Left-handed
- Bowling: Slow left-arm orthodox
- Role: Batsman

Domestic team information
- Years: Team
- 1994–2006: Uttar Pradesh

Career statistics
Competition	First-class	List A
Matches	93	70
Runs scored	4,831	2,214
Batting average	35.00	36.90
100s/50s	9/28	3/16
Top score	146	122*
Balls bowled	650	686
Wickets	11	27
Bowling average	32.81	22.03
5 wickets in innings	0	0
10 wickets in match	0	0
Best bowling	3/11	4/53
Catches/stumpings	51/0	25/0
- Source: ESPNcricinfo, 24 March 2013

Jyoti Prasad Yadav (born 26 September 1977) is an Indian first class cricketer from Allahabad. A left-handed middle order batsman, Yadav plays for and captains Uttar Pradesh. He made his first class debut in 1994/95 playing for Uttar Pradesh against Kerala in the KD Singh Babu Stadium, Lucknow. He made his First Class limited overs début playing for Uttar Pradesh against Haryana in the LB Stadium in Hyderabad in 1994/95. He was selected in the Indian squad for the Sahara Cup in Canada in September 1998.

In 1998 Jyoti Yadav got "Castrol Young Cricketer of the Year" award with Sachin Tendulkar who got senior cricketer of the year award. He was the first cricketer from Uttar Pradesh to get this award.

In Duleep Trophy debut in 1996, against East Zone, he scored 146 not out.

He was also captain U-19 India against Sri Lanka. Also, Ranji Trophy UP Captain 2002–2007. India U-19 vice captain against South Africa in home series. In 1994, went to England as vice captain of India U-17.

From 1996 onwards played Duleep Trophy and Deodhar Trophy regularly and was captain also.

He also led to the winning of Uttar Pradesh against Rest of India as a captain.

He got selected India A against Holland and got two consecutive centuries. Also got selected in Indian cricket team against Kenya Bangladesh under the captaincy of Mohd Azharuddin.

Got selected in Indian U-16 against New Zealand senior team and was the highest scorer.

He played England County League from 2002 to 2006 from Yorkshire club etc.

Later on decided to leave cricket and join politics to serve the people and contribute towards society in a meaningful way.

He contested For Uttar Pradesh Legislative Assembly elections from Allahabad West constituency in 2012 on the ticket of Samajwadi Party.
