= Kaushambi Lok Sabha constituency =

Lok Sabha constituency in Uttar Pradesh

Coordinates: 25.51°N 81.43°E

Kaushambi UP-50
- Lok Sabha constituency
- Interactive Map Outlining Kaushambi Lok Sabha constituency

Constituency details
- Country: India
- Region: North India
- State: Uttar Pradesh
- Assembly constituencies: Babaganj; Kunda; Sirathu; Manjhanpur; Chail
- Established: 2008-present
- Reservation: SC

Member of Parliament
- 18th Lok Sabha
- Incumbent Pushpendra Saroj
- Party: Samajwadi Party
- Elected year: 2024

Kaushambi Lok Sabha constituency is one of the 80 Lok Sabha (parliamentary) constituencies in Uttar Pradesh state in northern India. This constituency, spread over Kaushambi and Pratapgarh districts came into existence in 2008 as a part of the implementation of delimitation of parliamentary constituencies based on the recommendations of the Delimitation Commission of India constituted in 2002.

== Assembly segments ==
Presently, Kaushambi Lok Sabha constituency comprises five Vidhan Sabha (legislative assembly) segments. These are:

No	Name	District	Member	Party	2024 Lead
245	Babaganj (SC)	Pratapgarh	Vinod Saroj	JD(L)	SP
246	Kunda	Pratapgarh	Raghuraj Pratap Singh	JD(L)	SP
251	Sirathu	Kaushambi	Pallavi Patel	AD(K)	SP
252	Manjhanpur (SC)	Kaushambi	Indrajit Saroj	SP	SP
253	Chail	Kaushambi	Pooja Pal	IND	SP

== Members of Parliament ==
Year	Member	Party
Till 2008 : Constituency did not exist
2009	Shailendra Kumar	Samajwadi Party
2014	Vinod Kumar Sonkar	Bharatiya Janata Party
2019	Vinod Kumar Sonkar	Bharatiya Janata Party
2024	Pushpendra Saroj	Samajwadi Party

== Election results ==
=== 2024 ===
2024 Indian general elections: Kaushambi
Party	Candidate	Votes	%	±%
SP	Pushpendra Saroj	509,787	50.51	▲15.18
BJP	Vinod Kumar Sonkar	4,05,843	40.21	▲0.90
BSP	Shubh Narayan	55,858	5.53	▲5.53
NOTA	None of the Above	12,967	1.28	▼0.24
Majority		1,03,944	10.30	▲6.32
Turnout		10,09,329	52.85	▼1.71
SP gain from BJP		Swing		

=== 2019 ===
2019 Indian general elections: Kaushambi
Party	Candidate	Votes	%	±%
BJP	Vinod Sonkar	383,009	39.31	+2.88
SP	Indrajit Saroj	3,44,287	35.33	−
Jansatta Dal (L)	Shailendra Kumar	1,56,406	16.05	+16.05
Independent	Shailendra Kumar	26,967	2.77	
INC	Girish Chandra Pasi	16,442	1.69	
Independent	Shailendra Kumar	8,011	0.82	
PSP(L)	Rajdev	4,986	0.51	+0.51
NOTA	None of the Above	14,769	1.52	−0.15
Majority		38,722	3.98	−0.73
Turnout		9,75,037	54.56	
BJP hold		Swing		

=== 2014 result ===
2014 Indian general elections: Kaushambi
Party	Candidate	Votes	%	±%
BJP	Vinod Kumar Sonkar	331,724	36.43	+27.49
SP	Shailendra Kumar	2,88,824	31.72	−12.99
BSP	Suresh Pasi	2,01,322	22.11	−12.48
INC	Mahendra Kumar	31,905	3.50	−3.89
Independent	Mohan Lal	9,182	1.01	N/A
BMP	Shripal	7,341	0.81	N/A
RSMD	Malti Devi	6,548	0.72	N/A
LKD	Rajendra Sonkar	6,386	0.70	N/A
Independent	Bina Rani	4,957	0.54	N/A
AAP	Swarnalata Suman	3,692	0.41	N/A
Independent	Chhedoo	3,340	0.37	N/A
NOTA	None of the above	15,169	1.67	N/A
Majority		42,900	4.71	−5.41
Turnout		9,10,514	52.37	+12.74
Registered electors		16,72,976		
BJP gain from SP		Swing		

- #Swing based on addition of performance of BJP and Apna Dal in previous election

=== 2009 result ===
2009 Indian general elections: Kaushambi
Party	Candidate	Votes	%	±%
SP	Shailendra Kumar	246,501	44.71	
BSP	Girish Chandra Pasi	1,90,712	34.59	
INC	Ram Nihor Rakesh	40,765	7.39	
BJP	Gautam Chaudhary	30,475	5.53	
AD(K)	Umesh Chandra Pasi	18,799	3.41	
Independent	Ram Saran	11,570	2.10	
Independent	Man Singh	3,973	0.72	
Independent	Jagdeo	3,973	0.72	
IJP	Gulab Sonkar	2,975	0.54	
Independent	Gulab Chandra	2,500	0.45	
Majority		55,789	10.12	
Turnout		5,51,311	39.63	
Registered electors		13,91,312		
SP win (new seat)				

== See also ==
- Chail Lok Sabha constituency
- List of constituencies of the Lok Sabha
