= Daranagar =

- Town
- Location in Uttar Pradesh, India
- Coordinates: 25.6816208°N 81.3497579°E
- Country: India
- State: Uttar Pradesh
- District: Kaushambi
- Founder: Dara Shikoh

Population (2011)
  - Total: 24,803

Languages
  - Official: Hindi
- Time zone: UTC+5:30 (IST)
- 212204: 212204

Daranagar is a town in Kaushambi, a suburb of Allahabad, in Uttar Pradesh, India. The town is located approximately 17 km to the north of the district headquarters of Manjhanpur and is known for the main Pilgrim Center and it is situated at the bank of the Ganga river. The main attraction in the town is the Daranagar Tirtha, dedicated to Bhagwan Shri Rishabhdev. In addition to these well-known monuments, there are many other temples, such as the Hanuman Temple, Jain Temple, Jwala Devi Temple, Ram Janaki Temple, and Kalbhairav Temple. Daranagar is known for the Shia Jama Masjid Syedwarah and the Sunni Shahi Jama Masjid built by Dara Shikoh, the son of the famous Mughal emperor Shah Jahan.

== Geography ==
Daranagar is situated at 23°40'51"N 81°21'4"E, approximately 60 km from Allahabad and 3.2 km (2 miles) from Saini off the NH 2. The nearest railway station is Sirathu (NER), located 5 km (3 miles) from Daranagar. The nearest national airport is Allahabad Airport, and the nearest international airport is Varanasi Airport.

== History ==
The town was established by Sayyad Faizullah during the reign of Emperor Shah Jahan. The emperor later named the town Daranagar, after his son Dara Shikoh. The main attractions consist of a mosque, built in 1661; the mausoleum of Sayyad Faizullah, built in 1600; and the mausoleum of Gulam Husain.

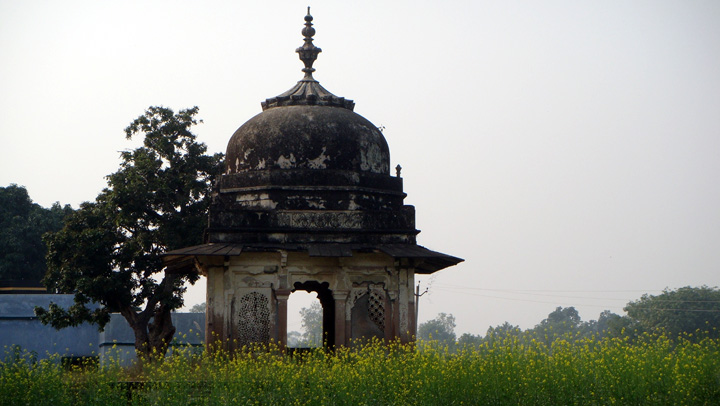
Syed Faizulla Shrine at Daranagar

Kara, Uttar Pradesh, a nearby township located on the banks of Ganga's River, has always been an important religious place for Hindus and also provides a great example of the Hindu–Muslim amalgamation of the area. Dara Shikoh spent several years of his life in this town and in his honor his name is preserved in the muhalla of Daranagar.

== Transportation ==
The primary means of transportation are taxis, buses and local rickshaws. Taxis are available at any time of the day. The nearest bus station is the Saini bus station. Daranagar Town is well connected by roads and rail to the surrounding big cities, such as Allahabad and Kanpur. The Sirathu Railway Station is on the Allahabad–Kanpur route. Mail or express trains often stop at the Sirathu. The preferred method of transport in Daranagar is road, with the national highway connecting Daranagar to Allahabad and Kanpur.

== Religious activity ==
People of different religions and castes live peacefully together in Daranagar. The different religions celebrate their respective festivals together. The major attraction of daranagar town is Dussehra festival celebration as well as the Shia & Sunni community gathering (Majlis & Juloos) from all over India in the month of Muharram (October).

== Education ==
The Town has many places of education, including GMIC Daranagar (SyedWarah), RP Degree College (Karbala), MGB Jr. High School (Katra), MUZA girls college (Katra), Jafrry Academy (SyedWarah), Shanti Devi College (Myohara), Saraswati Shishu Mandir (Bazar), MGB Madrsa (Katra), Sheetla Devi Balika Vidyalaya (Bazaar), JA ITI Tedimod), GGIC College and three government primary schools.

== Popular attractions ==
There are many attractions in the town for visitors to see, including the Imam Bargah Nawab Hussain, the shrine of Nawab Syed Faiullah and Rowza of Syed Ghulam Hussain, the fort of King Jai Chandra, the Choti Darbaar, the Ramleela Maidaan, Shrine Khwaza Abdaal Shah Bank Ganges, Shitla Mandir, St. Malook Place, Karbala, Kara Dham, and Kurukshetra Ground to celebrate Dusshera.

== See also ==
- Dharanagar, capital of Dhar State
