= Pichhra Dalit Muslim =

2024 alliance of Indian political parties in Uttar Pradesh

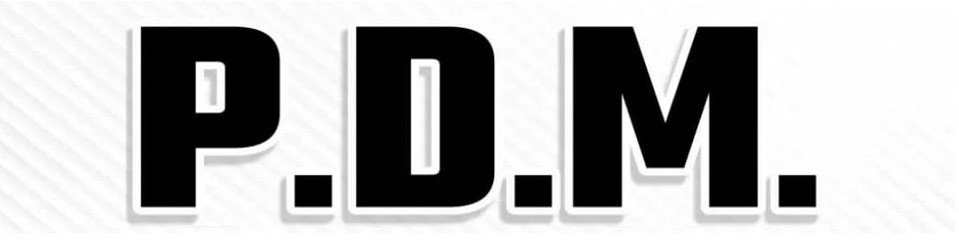
- Abbreviation: PDM
- Leader: Sapna Patel
- President: Asaduddin Owaisi
- Founded: 31 March 2024; 2 years ago
- Ideology: Social justice; Conservatism (Indian); Women's rights; Composite nationalism; Inclusive Governance; Muslims and Dalits Rights; Minority rights
- Colours
- ECI status: Not Required
- Seats in Uttar Pradesh Legislative Assembly: 1 / 403

Pichhra Dalit Muslim (PDM) is a political alliance forged between the All India Majlis-e-Ittehadul Muslimeen (AIMIM) and the Apna Dal (Kamerawadi) in Uttar Pradesh for the 18th Lok Sabha elections. Spearheaded by Pallavi Patel of Apna Dal (Kamerawadi) and AIMIM chief Asaduddin Owaisi, this alliance aims to champion the interests of marginalized communities.

In addition to AIMIM and Apna Dal (Kamerawadi), the PDM alliance includes other parties like Premchand Bind's Pragatisheel Manav Samaj Party and Rashtriya Uday Party. This development follows the dissolution of ties between the Samajwadi Party (SP) and Apna Dal (Kamerawadi) over differences in candidate selection.

The rift between the SP and Apna Dal (K) came to light during the February Rajya Sabha polls when Apna Dal (K) leader and SP MLA, Pallavi Patel, refused to support two SP candidates. Patel cited alleged deviations from the SP's PDA (Pichhra, Dalit, Alpasankhyak) formula in candidate nominations. Apna Dal (K) traces its roots back to the Apna Dal, founded by OBC leader Sone Lal Patel, whose legacy persists despite his passing in a tragic road accident in 2009.

== Candidates ==
On 13 April PDM declared its 7 seats.

#	Lok Sabha Seat	Candidate
1	Rae Bareli	Hafiz Mohammad Mobeen
2	Firozabad	Prem Dutt Baghel
3	Bareilly	Subhash Patel
4	Hathras	Jaiveer Singh Dhangar
5	Bhadohi	Prem Chand Bind
6	Fatehpur	Ramkishan Pal
7	Chandauli	Jawahar Bind
8	Lucknow	Mamta Kashyap
9	Mirzapur	Daulat Ram Patel
10	Pratapgarh	Rishi Patel
