= Keshav Prasad Maurya =

Indian politician (born 1969)

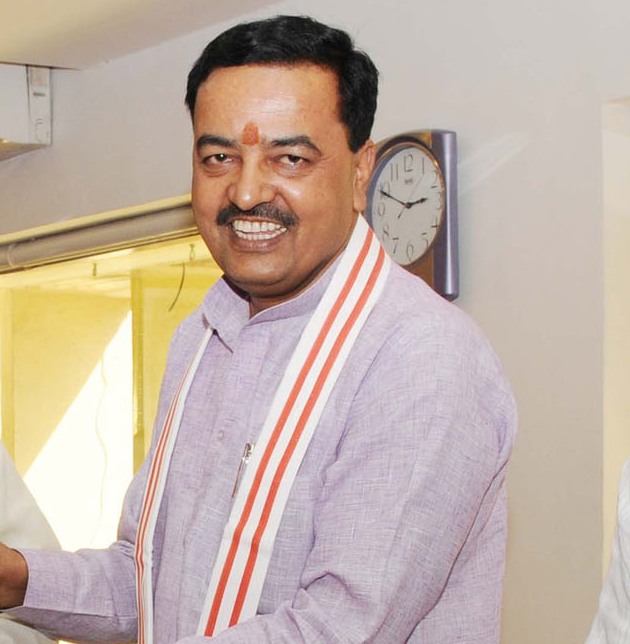
- Maurya in 2017

5th Deputy Chief Minister of Uttar Pradesh
- Incumbent
- Assumed office 19 March 2017 Serving with Brijesh Pathak (2022-); Dinesh Sharma (2017-2022)
- Chief Minister: Yogi Adityanath
- Portfolios: Rural Development, Rural Engineering, Food Processing, Entertainment Tax and Public Enterprises and National Integration
- Preceded by: Ram Naresh Yadav (1980)

Minister of Rural Development of Uttar Pradesh
- Incumbent
- Assumed office 25 March 2022
- Chief Minister: Yogi Adityanath
- Preceded by: Rajendra Pratap Singh

Minister of Public Works Department of Uttar Pradesh
- In office 19 March 2017 – 25 March 2022
- Chief Minister: Yogi Adityanath
- Succeeded by: Jitin Prasada

Minister of Food Processing Industries of Uttar Pradesh
- Incumbent
- Assumed office 19 March 2017
- Chief Minister: Yogi Adityanath

Member of Uttar Pradesh Legislative Council
- Incumbent
- Assumed office 9 September 2017
- Constituency: Elected by the MLAs

President of Bharatiya Janata Party, Uttar Pradesh
- In office 8 April 2016 – 31 August 2017
- Preceded by: Laxmikant Bajpai
- Succeeded by: Mahendra Nath Pandey

Member of Parliament, Lok Sabha
- In office 16 May 2014 – 21 September 2017
- Preceded by: Kapil Muni Karwariya
- Succeeded by: Nagendra Pratap Singh Patel
- Constituency: Phulpur, Uttar Pradesh

Member of Uttar Pradesh Legislative Assembly
- In office 6 March 2012 – 16 May 2014
- Preceded by: Wachaspati
- Succeeded by: Wachaspati
- Constituency: Sirathu

Personal details
- Born: 7 May 1969 (age 57) Sirathu, Uttar Pradesh, India
- Party: Bharatiya Janata Party
- Spouse: Rajkumari Devi Maurya (m. 1986)
- Children: 2
- Education: B.A
- Occupation: Businessman; politician
- Website: keshavprasadmaurya.com
- As of 17 December, 2016

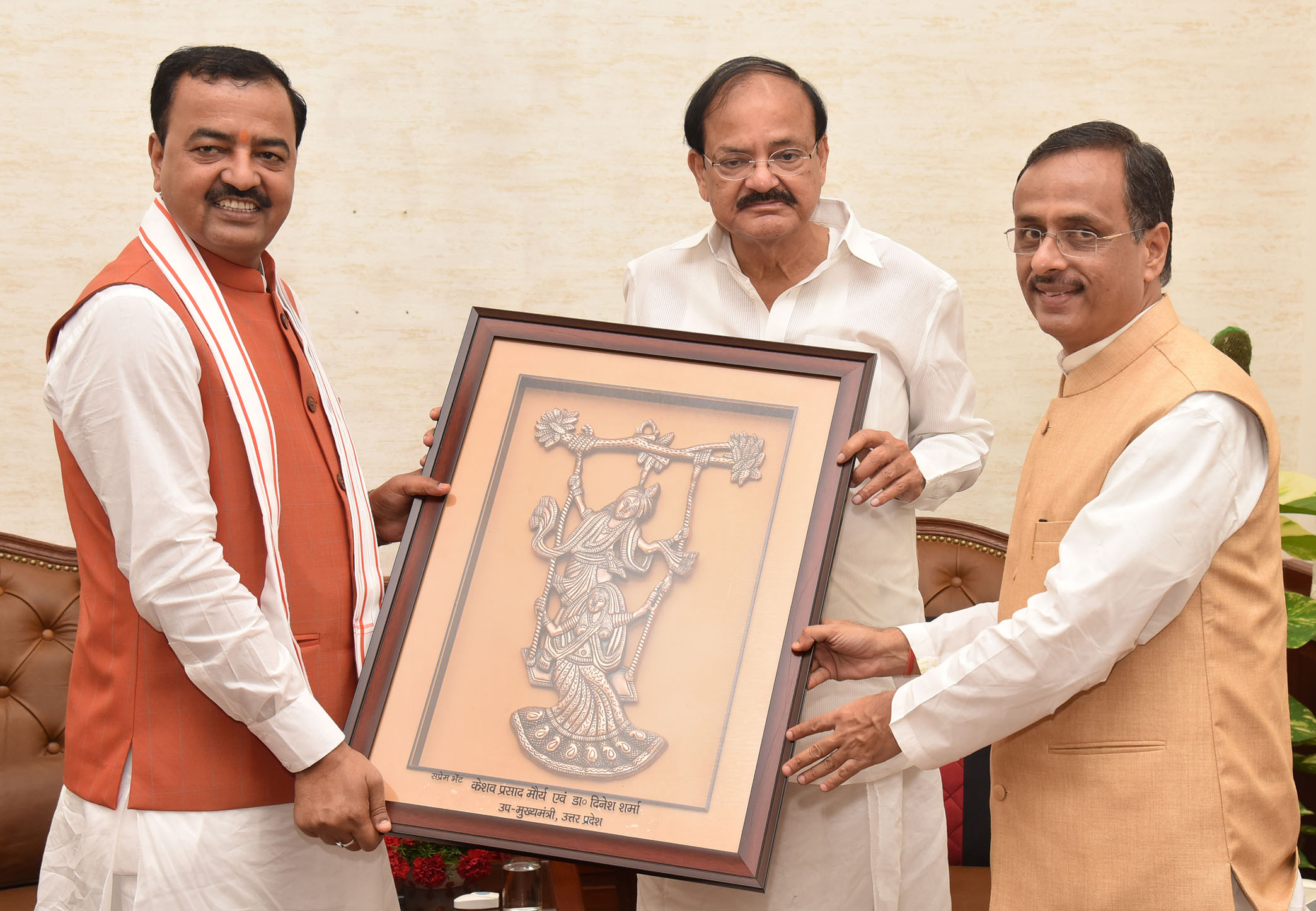
Maurya, in the left, with Dinesh Sharma and Venkaiah Naidu in 2017

Keshav Prasad Maurya (born 7 May 1969) is an Indian politician, currently serving as the 5th Deputy Chief Minister of Uttar Pradesh under Yogi Adityanath (along with Dinesh Sharma from 2017–22 and with Brajesh Pathak since 2022). He is a member of the Bharatiya Janata Party (BJP). Maurya was associated with a right-wing Hindu organization Rashtriya Swayamsevak Sangh, before entering active politics through BJP. He was also involved in cow protectionism in his early life. Before the 2017 Uttar Pradesh Legislative Assembly elections, he was made state president of the BJP, and after the victory of BJP, he was appointed Deputy Chief Minister of Uttar Pradesh in the first Yogi Adityanath Government. Maurya again contested the legislative assembly elections in 2022 from Sirathu Assembly constituency, losing to Pallavi Patel of Samajwadi Party. However, he was given a second term as Deputy CM in the second Yogi Adityanath government.

== Early life and career ==
Born in 1969, in Sirathu in Kausambhi district, adjoining Prayagraj, Maurya went on to study Hindi Literature at the Hindu Sahitya Sammelan in Prayagraj. Besides being a politician, Maurya is also the owner of several institutions, which includes, a hospital, a petrol pump, an agro trading company and Kamdhenu Logistics. His assets are spread across Allahabad. A member of the Rashtriya Swayamsevak Sangh, he also participated in the Ram Janmabhoomi movement. He belongs to Kushwaha community, which is spread across the state of Uttar Pradesh and is known by different names in different regions of state.

== Political career ==
Maurya has been associated with the RSS and the VHP-Bajrang Dal from an early age, holding the posts of Nagar Karyawah and VHP Pranth Sanghathan Mantri, among others. While being active in the gauraksha (cow-protection) movements. He also participated in the Ram Janmabhoomi movement. In the BJP, Maurya has been the regional (Kashi) coordinator of the backward class cell and the BJP Kisan Morcha. He has contested the 2002, 2007, and 2012 assembly elections, he lost the 2002 and 2007 elections but won in 2012, and was the sitting MLA from Sirathu assembly constituency before getting elected as MP from the Phulpur seat in 2014 with a thumping five lakh votes and over 52 percent votes. In April 2016, he was made the state president of BJP in Uttar Pradesh. Under his leadership, the BJP registered a historic victory in the 2017 Uttar Pradesh Legislative Assembly election. After the election results were out, he was considered a strong contender for the post of Chief Minister. On 18 March 2017, he was appointed the deputy chief minister of Uttar Pradesh.

He became the first MLA of the BJP from Sirathu Tahseel in the year 2012. It was the first time any MLA of BJP was elected from Sirathu Tahseel. And after two and a half years he became the MP from Phoolpur from BJP. He got the ministries of the Public Works Department (PWD), food processing, entertainment tax, and public enterprises department.

=== Uttar Pradesh Assembly Election 2022 ===
In the 2022 Uttar Pradesh Legislative Assembly election Keshav Prasad Maurya contested from Sirathu seat in his home district Kaushambi and lost to Samajwadi Party candidate Pallavi Patel.

== Career in BJP ==
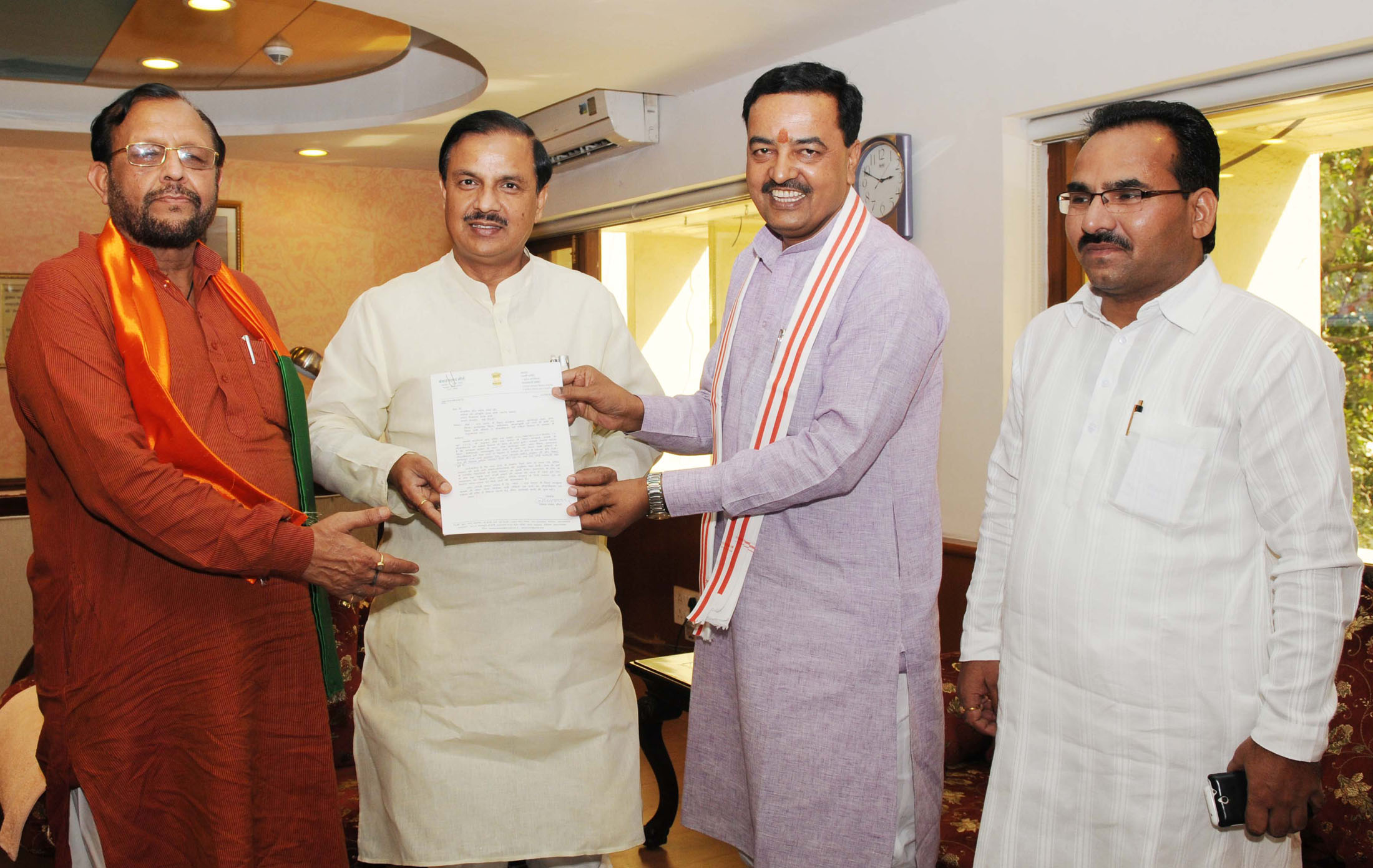
Keshav Prasad Maurya, MP, Phoolpur (U.P) and Shri Satyapal Singh Saini, MP, Sambhal (U.P) meeting the Minister of State for Culture (Independent Charge), Tourism (Independent Charge) and Civil Aviation.

Maurya was appointed state president of BJP for Uttar Pradesh, to consolidate the outreach of the party among Most Backward Castes. Traditionally, the parties active in the state, like the Bahujan Samaj Party and Samajwadi Party had the support of Yadavs and Jatavs, hence, with the appointment of Maurya as its state chief, BJP tried to woo non-Yadav OBCs in the state. Maurya worked to connect these social groups to the BJP, and with his efforts, the BJP was able to win 312 of the 403 assembly seats in Uttar Pradesh, in the 2017 legislative assembly elections. His tenure as BJP's state chief was also helpful in paving the way for the entry of another significant OBC leader, Swami Prasad Maurya in BJP, who also joined the party in 2016. After its win in the 2017 Assembly election, Maurya was increasingly projected as the OBC face of the party.

In his first tenure, Maurya remained critical of the politics of the Bahujan Samaj Party and Samajwadi Party. In 2019, during a rally, Mayawati urged Muslims to vote for the BSP-SP alliance. This statement of hers was criticised by Maurya in a press briefing. Maurya alleged that Mayawati had been using Dalits as a 'vote bank', and she had started appeasing Muslims. He also said that Akhilesh Yadav is not loyal and Mayawati shouldn't believe him, pointing towards latter's tussle with Shivpal Singh Yadav. In 2022, Akhilesh Yadav offered Keshav Maurya to cause a defection of hundred MLAs of BJP and join hands with Samajwadi Party. He ensured that the Samajwadi Party would provide support to Maurya in such a condition, and help him become the Chief Minister, replacing Yogi Adityanath. However, Maurya replied to Yadav that the latter should worry about their MLAs, as they can also defect towards BJP. Political analysts recorded increased verbal attack by opposition leaders, specially Samajwadi Party chief Akhilesh Yadav on Maurya, after his appointment as Deputy CM for his second term, right after losing his seat in 2022 Uttar Pradesh Legislative Assembly election. In a press conference, Yadav called Maurya a weak person. It was observed that during this phase of Maurya's tenure, Yadav and other opposition leaders singled him out and reduced their criticism of Yogi Adityanath. Time and again, during his second term as deputy CM, Maurya also criticised Akhilesh Yadav publicly in press conferences for the alleged increase in criminal activities during Yadav's premiership of Uttar Pradesh. Maurya also alleged the Samajwadi Party's deception of OBCs in the name of social justice.

In the first quarter of 2023, Akhilesh Yadav, while speaking to the media, called Maurya a Shudra. After this remark, Maurya alleged that Yadav could get him killed, as the latter possessed hate for him. Maurya was later projected as nationwide OBC face of BJP; he was deployed in various states during assembly elections to increase the mass outreach of the party. The state where he campaigned, included Gujarat in 2022, where BJP registered victory by a high margin.

While campaigning in Ahmedabad, Maurya called Congress leaders "Chunavi Hindus" (election Hindus), he also said that for the BJP, Gujarat is more important than Uttar Pradesh, despite Uttar Pradesh having eighty lok sabha seats, and Gujarat having only 26 seats. At an event organised by the Other Language Cell of the Gujarat wing of BJP, Maurya said:

“Those whose only aim is to insult Hindus in the country are chunavi Hindus. Look out for them…When elections are around, they go to the temple of Lord Somnath, Lord Ram, Hanuman. You should recall that when the Congress was in power in the country, it had told the Supreme Court that Lord Ram is just imaginary.”
... “Today, what forces the Congress to pay respects to Ram Lalla? The people of the country have known the character of Congress. And therefore, the country is becoming Congress-free.”

After its victory in the 2022 Uttar Pradesh Assembly elections, to strengthen its support base among the members of Koeri caste, Maurya was also made a participant in a convention celebrating the birth anniversary of Mauryan ruler Ashoka in Patna. In 2019, while campaigning for BJP candidate Narendra Mehta in Mira Bhayander constituency in Thane, Maurya said: "Voting for BJP is like dropping Atom Bomb on Pakistan. He also takes a dig at other parties by saying that Hinduism deity Lakshmi does not sit on bicycle or palm (election symbols of Samajwadi Party and Indian National Congress), rather she sits on Lotus (election symbol of BJP). He also compared the BJP's symbol with insignia of development.

Maurya also played a significant role in bringing many leaders of the Kushwaha community, or those leaders, who were supported by the community in the state of Uttar Pradesh, into the fold of BJP, soon after his elevation as the chief of BJP for Uttar Pradesh. One such example is of Member of Legislative Assembly from Agra Rural constituency, Hemalata Diwakar Kushwaha, who, though herself being a member of Schedule Caste Dhobi community, was supported by members of Kushwaha community in Agra constituency due to her marriage with Tikam Singh Kushwaha. It was reported that the Kushwahas were supporters of the Bahujan Samaj Party in Uttar Pradesh earlier, but BJP followed a strategy of elevatingleaders from this caste to higher positions, after raising Maurya as its state unit chief, to win over the community.

By 2023, Maurya was also made a part of campaigns of the Bharatiya Janata Party in other states, where he was made a participant in several caste rallies. In June 2023, Maurya addressed a Grand Assembly (Mahasangam) of Mali caste in Jaipur. This assembly was attended by several notable community members from the caste cluster of Maurya, Kushwaha, Mali, and Saini, which included Shobha Rani Kushwaha and former cabinet minister of Rajasthan, Prabhu Lal Saini. However, during his address, Maurya had to face sloganeering in favour of Rajasthan Chief Minister, Ashok Gehlot, which disrupted his speech. These campaigns of Maurya were a part of BJP's strategy to build an alliance of similar caste groups in Rajasthan, as it did in Uttar Pradesh.

In July 2024, Maurya expressed his discontent against the style of functioning of Yogi Adityanath government. During 2024 general elections in Uttar Pradesh, the rift between BJP government of the state under Adityanath and BJP party workers came to the surface with BJP losing 29 seats in the Lok Sabha elections from the state. In a meeting of party workers, Maurya commented that organisation of BJP has always remained bigger than the government and it will be so in future. This was interpreted by a section of Indian media as an attack on leadership of Yogi Adityanath. Previously, Maurya had also skipped several cabinet meetings chaired by Adityanath.

In the meantime, Maurya flew to Delhi and met BJP's national president J.P Nadda twice. However, amidst rumours of rift between Yogi Adityanath and Maurya, latter praised Yogi Adityanath in a public address in Mirzapur district. Maurya demanded that some of the party activities that were supposed to be conducted through the political workers of BJP have been taken over by Yogi Adityanath government and the workers are not getting the recognition due to them. This event was considered as a thaw in relationship between Maurya and Yogi.

== Ideology ==
Maurya with Nitin Gadkari and Yogi Adityanath.

Maurya was involved in cow protectionism in his early days while working as a member of various right-wing Hindu organisations. In an interview given to The Hindu, he supported the decision of Uttar Pradesh government of imposing National Security Act on those killing cows. He believed that, in the rule of BJP, the already existing cow protection legislation in the state were being implemented stringently. According to Maurya, the strict implementation of the provisions of NSA on those guilty of cow-slaughter will prevent others from doing so.

== Governance ==
In February 2023, Maurya launched a website named after him. The website was launched in order to make it easy for the people from the countryside in the state of Uttar Pradesh to connect with the Deputy Chief Minister Maurya. It was also designed in a way to make common people eligible to send suggestions and lodge complaints. He also launched a mobile application to track the step taken by government on the complaint made by people.

In July 2024, Maurya was quick to write to the Appointment and Personnel department of Government of Uttar Pradesh, which then functioned under Chief Minister Yogi Adityanath, on the issue of proper implementation of the reservation for Schedule Castes, Tribes and Other Backward Castes. The issue arose after dismal performance of BJP in 2024 Lok Sabha polls in Uttar Pradesh under Yogi Adityanath. Party's state chief Bhupendera Singh Chaudhary submitted a report to central leadership of BJP that sought shifting of votes of SC, ST and OBC community to INDIA alliance as the reason behind poor performance of BJP. Maurya, hence, demanded the data from the Appointment and Personnel department on contractual and outsourced staffs who were being recruited to various government departments in a bid to examine that whether the OBC, SC and ST community is represented in those appointments or not. Maurya's response came soon after allegations made by BJP's ally Anupriya Patel, who alleged that under Yogi Adityanath government, the SC, ST and OBC candidates are being declared not suitable in the interview based appointment process to government departments, which hinders the implementation of reservation policy made for their proper representation at various echelons of government.

Maurya also backed the protest of 69,000 teachers who were about to be recruited by a test conducted in 2019 for the position of Assistant Teachers in various government schools of Uttar Pradesh. The protesters alleged that despite securing more marks than the candidates of general category they were being selected against the vacancy meant for reserved category candidates. Moreover, the quota rules for the reserved category candidates are being sidelined and more than fifty percent of general caste candidates are being selected reducing the representation of Other Backward Castes and Dalits. In 2022, Yogi Adityanath government agreed to the allegations and admitted that discrepancies in implementation of quota rules have happened. This was followed by judgements of Allahabad High Court on issuing fresh list of candidates after reconsideration of the quota rules.

== Electoral performance ==
=== Lok Sabha ===
Election	Constituency	Party	Result	Vote	Opposite candidate	Party	Vote
2014	Phulpur	BJP	Won	52.44%	Dharmraj Patel	SP	20.33%

=== Uttar Pradesh Legislative Assembly ===
Election	Constituency	Party	Result	Vote	Opposite candidate	Party	Vote
2004 (bye)	Allahabad West	BJP	Lost	4.09%	Raju Pal	BSP	47.16%
2007	Allahabad West	BJP	Lost	9.31%	Pooja Pal	BSP	47.08%
2012	Sirathu	BJP	Won	30.26%	Anand Mohan	BSP	25.11%
2022	Sirathu	BJP	Lost	43.28%	Pallavi Patel	SP	46.49%

== See also ==
- Samrat Choudhary
- Upendra Kushwaha

== Bibliography ==
- Sarkar, J. (2021). Politics as Social Text in India: The Bahujan Samaj Party in Uttar Pradesh. India: Taylor & Francis. p. 171. ISBN 978-1-000-37034-8.
- Narayan, B. (2021). Republic of Hindutva: How the Sangh Is Reshaping Indian Democracy. India: Penguin Random House India Private Limited. pp. 84–85. ISBN 978-81-950843-7-1.

Lok Sabha
Preceded by Kapil Muni Karwariya	Member of Parliament for Phulpur; 2014–2017	Succeeded by Nagendra Pratap Singh Patel
