= Kashiya =

Proposed town in Uttar Pradesh, India

Kashia East, Uttar Pradesh Kashia Poorab Kashia Sadat
- Town
- Nickname: Kashia East
- Location in Uttar Pradesh, India
- Coordinates: 25.32°N 81.32°E
- Country: India
- State: Uttar Pradesh
- District: Kaushambi
- Elevation: 82 m (269 ft)

Population (2001)
  - Total: 10,000

Languages
  - Official: Hindi
- Time zone: UTC+5:30 (IST)
- Postal code: 212201

Kashia East, also known asKashia poorab, is a proposed town area nagar panchayat. It would include Muratganj in Kaushambi district.

== History ==
Kashiya East was earlier known as Kashiya Sadat in Pargana Chail for being one of eight villages inhabited by Naqvi Bukhari Syeds, the descendants of Syed Hussam uddin Hasan Bukhari, great-grandson of Hazrat Jalaluddin Surkh-Posh Bukhari of Ucch Bukharan (Bahawalpur) Multan province in the Southern Punjab of Pakistan.

== Public amenities ==
Kashia is Kasiya (CT), where CT stands for Census Town as per India Census 2011. Kashia East is a village in the Murat Ganj block in Chail Tehsil, near Bharwari. Amenities include two government Primary Health Clinics (PHC), one Veterinary hospital, one Primary high school and one Junior High school, Kanya Pathsala.

== Hamlets ==
Kashia East comprises many hamlets, including Shergarh, ChikwanPura, Nadirganj and Bazar ka Bagh.

== Demographics ==
As of the 2011 Indian census, Kashiya East had a population of 7,050. Males constitute 51% of the population and females 49%. Kashiya East has an average literacy rate of 56.18%, lower than the national average of 59.5%; with male literacy of 71% and female literacy of 40%. 17% of the population is under 6 years of age.
