= Ajhuwa =

- Town
- Location in Uttar Pradesh, India Ajhuwa (India)
- Coordinates: 25°42′53″N 81°15′26″E
- Country: India
- State: Uttar Pradesh
- District: Kaushambi

Government
  - Type: Town

Population (2001)
  - Total: 14,421

Languages
  - Official: Hindi
- Time zone: UTC+5:30 (IST)
- PIN: 212 217
- Vehicle registration: UP
- Website: up.gov.in

Ajhuwa, (also spelled Ajuha) is a town, and nagar panchayat in Kaushambi district in the state of Uttar Pradesh, India.

== Overview ==
Ajhuwa is located in Sirathu tehsil, of Kaushambi district in Allahabad Pin Code 212217. It is on National Highway 2, stretching in north-south direction and is socially segregated on caste basis as vaishya basti, Gwal basti, etc. Of the total population, about 20 percent are Scheduled Castes as per 2001 Census.

== Demographics ==
As of the 2001 Census of India, Ajhuwa had a population of 14,421. Males constituted 52% of the population and females 48%. Ajhuwa had an average literacy rate of 49%, lower than the national average of 59.5%; with 63% of the males and 37% of females literate. 18% of the population was under 6 years of age as of that census.

== Ajhuwa Bazaar ==
The market of Ajhuwa, also called Ajuha Bazar, is a business centre in grains, vegetables and jaggery, and is a market for buying and selling of animals by local farmers. It is dominated mainly by vaishya (merchants).

An Agriculture Market Committee has been established by the Rajya Krishi Utpadan Mandi Parishad (The State Agricultural Produce Marketing Board of Uttar Pradesh) to regulate and develop the Bazar. The committee has an office along one side of the market where there is also a branch of the State Bank of India & Csp Sbi which provides for easy money transfer/withdrawal by farmers and mandi (market) members.
