= Pallavi Patel =

Indian politician

Dr. Pallavi Patel

Member of Uttar Pradesh Legislative Assembly
- Incumbent
- Assumed office 10 March 2022
- Preceded by: Sheetala Prasad
- Constituency: Sirathu

Personal details
- Born: 1 january 1981 (age 44–45) Kanpur, Uttar Pradesh, India
- Party: Apna Dal (Kamerawadi)
- Spouse: Pankaj Niranjan
- Relations: Anupriya Patel (sister); Ashish Singh (brother-in-law)
- Parents: Sone Lal Patel (father); Krishna Patel (mother)

Pallavi Patel is an Indian politician from the state of Uttar Pradesh. She is the leader of Apna Dal (Kamerawadi) party. She is the daughter of Apna Dal founder Sone Lal Patel and current member of the Uttar Pradesh Legislative Assembly from Sirathu as Samajwadi Party candidate.

Pallavi Patel is the sister of Anupriya Patel, a former minister of State for Commerce and Industry of India and president of Apna Dal (Soneylal) political party.

== Political career ==
In the 2022 Uttar Pradesh Legislative Assembly election, Apna Dal (Kamerawadi)'s leader, Dr. Pallavi Patel contested on the Samajwadi Party symbol and defeated Deputy Chief Minister Keshav Prasad Maurya by 7,337 votes in Sirathu.
