= Pallari Assembly constituency =

Constituency of the Chhattisgarh legislative assembly in India

Pallari
- Former constituency for the Chhattisgarh Legislative Assembly

Constituency details
- Country: India
- Region: Central India
- State: Chhattisgarh
- Established: 2003
- Abolished: 2008
- Total electors: 147,750

Pallari Assembly constituency was an assembly constituency in the India state of Chhattisgarh.

== Members of the Legislative Assembly ==
Election	Member	Party
2003	Dr. Shiv Kumar Dahria	Indian National Congress

== Election results ==
=== Assembly Election 2003 ===
2003 Chhattisgarh Legislative Assembly election : Pallari
Party	Candidate	Votes	%	±%
INC	Dr. Shiv Kumar Dahria	40,814	38.55%	New
BJP	Durga Prasad Maheshwar	38,112	36.00%	New
BSP	Smt. Gita Gritlahre	13,740	12.98%	New
NCP	Bhisan Gurupanch	6,440	6.08%	New
Independent	Mohan Lal Ratnakar	3,056	2.89%	New
AD(K)	Anand Kumar Bandhe	2,004	1.89%	New
Chhattisgarhi Samaj Party	Dilip Kumar Banjare	1,697	1.60%	New
Margin of victory		2,702	2.55%	
Turnout		105,863	71.65%	
Registered electors		147,750		
INC win (new seat)				
