= Kadarpur Nanu =

Coordinates: 29.3400°N 78.2600°E

Kadarpur Nanu is a village in Bijnor district, Uttar Pradesh, India that was established by Bhoop Singh. The village has a temple built on a well.

A Sahu Jain family of nearby Najibabad town also built a school for girls called Asharfi Devi Vidyalaya that was later handed over to the local mosque Noor Masjid and was converted to a Madarsa.

Vidur Kuti is about 58 km from Kadarpur Nanu. As the legend goes, Vidur, the Prime Minister of the Kauravas during Mahabharata spent rest of his life after dispute with Duryodhan. This is the place where Lord Krishana visited Vidur.

During Mahabharat when the battle between Kauravas and Pandavas was about to begin, on the request of both the sides, all wives and children from both sides were sent to Mahatma Vidur for safety. He had insufficient space for them so he found an area for women and children, which is now known as Daranagar.

Other landmarks here include the Kanva Ashram. It is an ancient ashram that is in a broken condition near the Rawli town. According to the legend "Abhigyan Shakuntalam", Hastinapur's King Dushyant came here on a hunting trip and fell in love with Shakuntala.

Ganj is 52 km from Kadarpur Nanu and 12 km from the District HQ and 1 km from Daranagar on the banks of the Ganges. There are ancient temples and ashrams.

Historical places – Daaku Sultana fort (Najibabad), Kho bairaj (Sherkot) and Ram Ganga Bairaj (Harewali)

== Religious places ==
- Shiv Mandir
- Kot Ke Devta
- Noor Masjid
- A fair is held near the village in aashad (Hindi month) attracting people from as far away as Delhi.
