= Manjhanpur =

- Town
- Location in Uttar Pradesh, India Manjhanpur (India)
- Coordinates: 25.53°N 81.38°E
- Country: India
- State: Uttar Pradesh
- District: Kaushambi
- Elevation: 90 m (300 ft)

Population (2011)
  - Total: 16,457

Languages
  - Official: Hindi
- Time zone: UTC+5:30 (IST)
- Vehicle registration: UP-73

Manjhanpur is a town, nagar palika and the district headquarters of Kaushambi district in the Indian state of Uttar Pradesh. The nearest railway station is in Bharwari, which is 11 km (6.8 mi) from Manjhanpur. Bharwari and Sirathu are the two main railway stations in Kaushambi district, and both are well connected to major cities such as Delhi, Kolkata, Prayagraj, Varanasi, Kanpur, and Lucknow. There are many autos, taxis, and buses available to reach Bharwari railway station. The nearest airport is Prayagraj Airport, 45 km (28 mi) from Manjhanpur. The town also has several hospitals. A newly inaugurated bus stop has started transportation services and is well connected with Prayagraj, Rajapur, Chitrakoot, Kanpur, and other nearby cities.

== Religious Sites ==
Manjhanpur has a Durga Mandir, where a large number of people offer prayers every day. A mela is organized once a year by the locals and the mandir committee. Many people visit during this time to offer Puja and Aarti.

== Political Field ==
Urban local body(Municipality) - Manjhanpur

Mayour -

State Legislative Council Constituency- Manjhanpur

Member of MLC - Indrajeet Saroj

Lok Sabha Constituency- Kaushambi

Member of Lok Sabha- Vinod Kumar Sonkar

== Facilities ==
=== Hospital ===
Manjhanpur is famous for its healthcare facilities within the district.

Manjhanpur has a Primary Health Care Centre and a District Hospital. District Hospital has numerous facilities for patients and also it imparts training to practitioner. There are large number of Private Hospital which provides services to patients.

=== Transportation ===
A bus stop, situated near to District Hospital, is well connected to Rajapur, Chitrakoot, Prayagraj, Varanasi and Kanpur. The Tempo Bus Stand near District Hospital provides facility of transportation to nearby areas.

=== Education ===
Shri Durga Devi Inter College is the oldest school of Manjhanpur, which offers education upto 12 class. It is established before Independence of India. Apart from this, there are other colleges and schools, including MV Convest School, Darul Uloom Ehsaniya, and BP Public School.

=== Sports ===
Multi Sports Stadium is situated near to Manjhanpur which provides opportunity to everyone. Tournaments and sports activity are performed on a timely basis to engage public in sports.

=== Food ===
Osa Mandi is situated near to the District Hospital. It does the transaction of fruits, cereals, dal and other foods.

== Demographics ==
As of 2011 India census, Manjhanpur had a population of 16,457. Males constitute 53% of the population and females 47%. Manjhanpur has an average literacy rate of 68.18%, lower than the national average of 74.04%: male literacy is 74.37%, and female literacy is 61.2%. In Manjhanpur, 15% of the population are under six years of age.
