= Sirathu Assembly constituency =

Constituency of the Uttar Pradesh legislative assembly in India

Coordinates: 25.65°N 81.32°E

Sirathu
- Constituency No. 251 for the Uttar Pradesh Legislative Assembly

Constituency details
- Country: India
- Region: North India
- State: Uttar Pradesh
- District: Kaushambi
- Total electors: 3,81,662
- Reservation: None

Member of Legislative Assembly
- 18th Uttar Pradesh Legislative Assembly
- Incumbent Pallavi Patel
- Party: AD(K)
- Elected year: 2022

Sirathu is a constituency of the Uttar Pradesh Legislative Assembly covering the city of Sirathu in the Kaushambi district of Uttar Pradesh, India.

Sirathu is one of five assembly constituencies in the Kaushambi Lok Sabha constituency. Since 2008, this assembly constituency is numbered 251 amongst 403 constituencies. This constituency is dominated by Patels, Pasis and Pandits. There exists a substantial population of Mauryas and Kushwahas as well.

== Members of Legislative Assembly ==
Year	Member	Party
1962	Hemwati Nandan Bahuguna	Indian National Congress
1967	Mangala Prasad Tiwari	Indian National Congress
1969	Ram Charan	Samyukta Socialist Party
1974	Baij Nath Kushwaha	Bharatiya Kranti Dal
1977	Baij Nath Kushwaha	Janata Party
1980	Jagdish Prasad	Indian National Congress (I)
1985	Purushottam Lal	Indian National Congress
1989	Radhey Shyam Bhartiya	Janata Dal
1991	Bhagirathi	Janata Dal
1993	Ram Sajiwan Nirmal	Bahujan Samaj Party
1996	Matesh Chandra Sonkar	Bahujan Samaj Party
2002	Matesh Chandra Sonkar	Bahujan Samaj Party
2007	Vachaspati	Bahujan Samaj Party
2012	Keshav Prasad Maurya	Bharatiya Janata Party
2014^	Vachaspati	Samajwadi Party
2017	Sheetla Prasad	Bharatiya Janata Party
2022	Pallavi Patel	Apna Dal (Kamerawadi)

== Election results ==
=== 2027 ===
2027 Uttar Pradesh Legislative Assembly election: Sirathu
Party	Candidate	Votes	%	±%
INDIA	Pallavi Patel			
NDA				
BSP				
NOTA	None of the above			
Majority				
Turnout				
gain from		Swing		

=== 2022 ===
2022 Uttar Pradesh Legislative Assembly election: Sirathu
Party	Candidate	Votes	%	±%
SP	Pallavi Patel	106,278	46.49	▲19.77
BJP	Keshav Prasad Maurya	98,941	43.28	▲3.21
BSP	Munsab Ali	10,073	4.41	▼17.91
Independent	Jeetendra Kumar	2,686	1.17	
NOTA	None of the above	727	0.32	▼0.61
Majority		7,337	3.21	▼10.14
Turnout		228,626	59.9	▲3.96
AD(K) gain from BJP		Swing		

=== 2017 ===
2017 Uttar Pradesh Legislative Assembly election: Sirathu
Party	Candidate	Votes	%	±%
BJP	Sheetla Prasad	78,621	40.07	
SP	Vachaspati	52,418	26.72	
BSP	Saeedurrab	43,782	22.32	
BMP	Ashish Kumar Maurya	4,453	2.27	
Independent	Vishwajeet Singh	2,396	1.22	
CPI	Shiv Singh Yadav	2,179	1.11	
NOTA	None of the above	1,806	0.93	
Majority		26,203	13.35	
Turnout		196,186	55.94	
BJP gain from SP		Swing		

=== 2014 ===
By-election, 2014: Sirathu
Party	Candidate	Votes	%	±%
SP	Vachaspati	79,540	47.71	
BJP	Santosh Singh Patel	55,018	33.00	
Majority				
Turnout		1,68,351	49.61	
SP gain from BJP		Swing		

=== 2012 ===
2012 Uttar Pradesh Legislative Assembly election: Sirathu
Party	Candidate	Votes	%	±%
BJP	Keshav Prasad Maurya	57,926	30.3	+30.3
BSP	Anand Mohan	48,063	25.1	−23.7
SP	Kailash Chandra Kesarwani	32,309	16.9	−8.6
INC	Mohd Farid Khan	20,890	10.9	+3.2
AD(K)	Istiyak Ahmad	9,527	5.0	−7.6
Majority		9,863	5.2	
Turnout		1,69,100	49.61	
BJP gain from BSP		Swing		

== See also ==
- Sirathu
- Kaushambi district
- Kaushambi Lok Sabha constituency
