= Sunil Patel =

Sunil Patel may refer to:

- Sunil Patel (politician)
- Sunil Patel (comedian)
