= Baraisa =

Coordinates: 25°27′N 81°19′E

Baraisa (PC 212214) is a village in Manjhanpur Tehsil of Kaushambi district of Uttar Pradesh

In Baraisa the temple of lord Hanuman is very popular among the people of Baraisa.

Baraisa come under the Manjhanpur Tehsil and the MLA of Manjhanpur is of SP, Indrajeet Saroj through 2017 election.

== Demographics ==
As per Population Census 2011 Barasia had a population of 2689 out of which 1432 were males while 1257 were females. Population of children below 6 years of age is around 452 (16.81% of the total population). Average sex ratio for Barasia is 878 which is way lower than the state average of 912. Sex ratio for children below 6 years of age is at 773 in contrast to the state average being at 902. Literacy rate of Baraisa as per 2011 census stands at 65.27% (Males – 72.22 and Females – 57.55) compared to 67.68% of Uttar Pradesh. 48% of people living in Barasia belong to Schedule Caste.

== Demographics ==
The people of Baraisa are generally Hindus. They speak Hindi, Urdu, Bhojpuri, and a little bit of Avadhi.

== Economy ==
Agriculture is the main source of income and employment for the people.
