= Indrajit Saroj =

Indian politician (born 1963)

Member of Uttar Pradesh Legislative Assembly
- Incumbent
- Assumed office 10 March 2022
- Preceded by: Lal Bahadur
- In office 1996–2017
- Succeeded by: Lal bahadur
- Constituency: Manjhanpur

National General Secretary Samajwadi Party
- Incumbent
- Assumed office 2019

Cabinet Minister Government of Uttar Pradesh
- In office 2007–2012
- Chief Minister: Mayawati
- Ministry & Department's: Social Welfare; SC/ST Welfare; Child Development & Nutrition; Agricultural Marketing.

Personal details
- Born: 14 January 1963 (age 63) Nagreha Khurd, Uttar Pradesh, India
- Party: Samajwadi Party
- Other political affiliations: Bahujan Samaj Party
- Spouse: Pushpa Devi
- Children: Pushpendra Saroj
- Parent: Maideen

Indrajit Saroj (born 14 January 1963) is a senior politician and National General Secretary of Samajwadi Party. He is currently Member of the Uttar Pradesh Legislative Assembly from Manjhanpur Assembly constituency.

== Political life ==
Indrajit Saroj was born on 1 January 1963 in Nagreha Khurd Paschim Sharira of then Allahabad now Kaushambi. His father Maideen was a farmer. Influenced by the ideas of Babasaheb Ambedkar from his student life, Indrajit Saroj continued to participate in political activities and movements, he graduated from Allahabad University in 1985, after which he came into the main political stream and Bahujan Samaj Party inspired by Manyavar Kanshi Ram joined in. He was elected MLA for the first time from Manjhanpur in the 1996 assembly elections. He has been cabinet minister of Uttar Pradesh several times. He is a four time MLA from Manjhanpur Vidhansabha till now and though he lost the election to BJP's Lal Bahadur in 2017 assembly election. After differences with Mayawati, he left Bahujan Samaj Party in 2018 and joined Samajwadi Party, currently he is the Deputy Leader of opposition the House in Uttar Pradesh Legislative Assembly and also National General Secretary of Samajwadi Party.

== Personal life ==
Indrajit Saroj is married to Pushpa Devi. They have three daughters and a son. Their son Pushpendra Saroj is the youngest Member of Parliament of India in 18th Lok Sabha, educated in accounting and management at Queen Mary University of London .
