= Mahendra Singh Patel =

Indian politician (born 1968)

Member of Uttar Pradesh Legislative Assembly
- In office September 2014 – March 2017
- Preceded by: Anupriya Patel
- Succeeded by: Surendra Narayan Singh
- Constituency: Rohaniya

Personal details
- Born: 22 August 1968 (age 57) Varanasi, Uttar Pradesh, India
- Party: Samajwadi Party
- Spouse: Shakuntala Devi
- Parent: Lalman Patel (father)
- Profession: Agriculturist; politician

Mahendra Singh Patel (born 22 August 1968) is an Indian politician and a former Uttar Pradesh MLA. who was a member of the 16th Legislative Assembly of Uttar Pradesh of India. In the 16th Legislative Assembly of Uttar Pradesh, he represented the Rohaniya constituency of Varanasi district as a member of the Samajwadi Party.

== Early life and education ==
Mahendra Singh Patel was born in Varanasi district. Before being elected as MLA, he used to work as an agriculturist.

== Political career ==
Mahendra Singh Patel has been a MLA for one term. He represented the Rohaniya constituency and was elected during the by-election in 2014.

== Posts held ==
#	From	To	Position	Comments
01	2014	2017	Member, 16th Legislative Assembly	

== See also ==
- Government of India
- Politics of India
- Rohaniya
- Samajwadi Party
- Uttar Pradesh Legislative Assembly
