= Sunil Patel (politician) =

Indian politician (born 1980)

Dr. Sunil Patel

Member of Uttar Pradesh Legislative Assembly
- Incumbent
- Assumed office 10 March 2022
- Preceded by: Surendra Narayan Singh
- Constituency: Rohaniya

Personal details
- Born: 15 January 1980 (age 46) India
- Party: Apna Dal (Soneylal)
- Other political affiliations: National Democratic Alliance (2012–present)
- Occupation: Politician

Dr. Sunil Patel (born 15 January 1980) is an Indian politician from the state of Uttar Pradesh, of the Apna Dal (Sonelal) party, who is serving as a member of 18th Legislative Assembly, from the Rohaniya constituency in Varanasi.
