= Surendra Narayan Singh =

Indian politician (born 1955)

Member of Uttar Pradesh Legislative Assembly
- In office 19 March 2017 – 25 March 2022
- Preceded by: Mahendra Singh Patel
- Succeeded by: Sunil Patel
- Constituency: Rohaniya

Personal details
- Born: 31 August 1955 (age 71) Varanasi, Uttar Pradesh, India
- Party: Vikassheel Insaan Party
- Profession: Politician

Surendra Narayan Singh (born 31 August 1955) is an Indian politician and a former member of the Legislative Assembly of Uttar Pradesh state. He represented the Rohaniya constituency of Varanasi district. He is member of the Vikassheel Insaan Party.

== Political career ==
Surendra Narayan Singh has been a member of the 17th Legislative Assembly of Uttar Pradesh. Since 2017, he has represented the Rohaniya constituency and is a member of the Vikassheel Insaan Party. Surendra Narayan Singh defeated Mahendra Singh Patel of Samajwadi Party with a margin of 57,553 votes in Uttar Pradesh assembly elections held in 2017. He was jila panchayat sadsya and gram pradhan before becoming an MLA.

On 6 February 2018, Singh and his supporters blocked a road near Rameshwar for hours in protest of police failing to take action against trucks passing through the road despite being banned.

== Posts held ==
#	From	To	Position	Comments
01	2017	2022	Member, 17th Legislative Assembly	
