= Pushpendra Saroj =

Indian politician (born 1999)

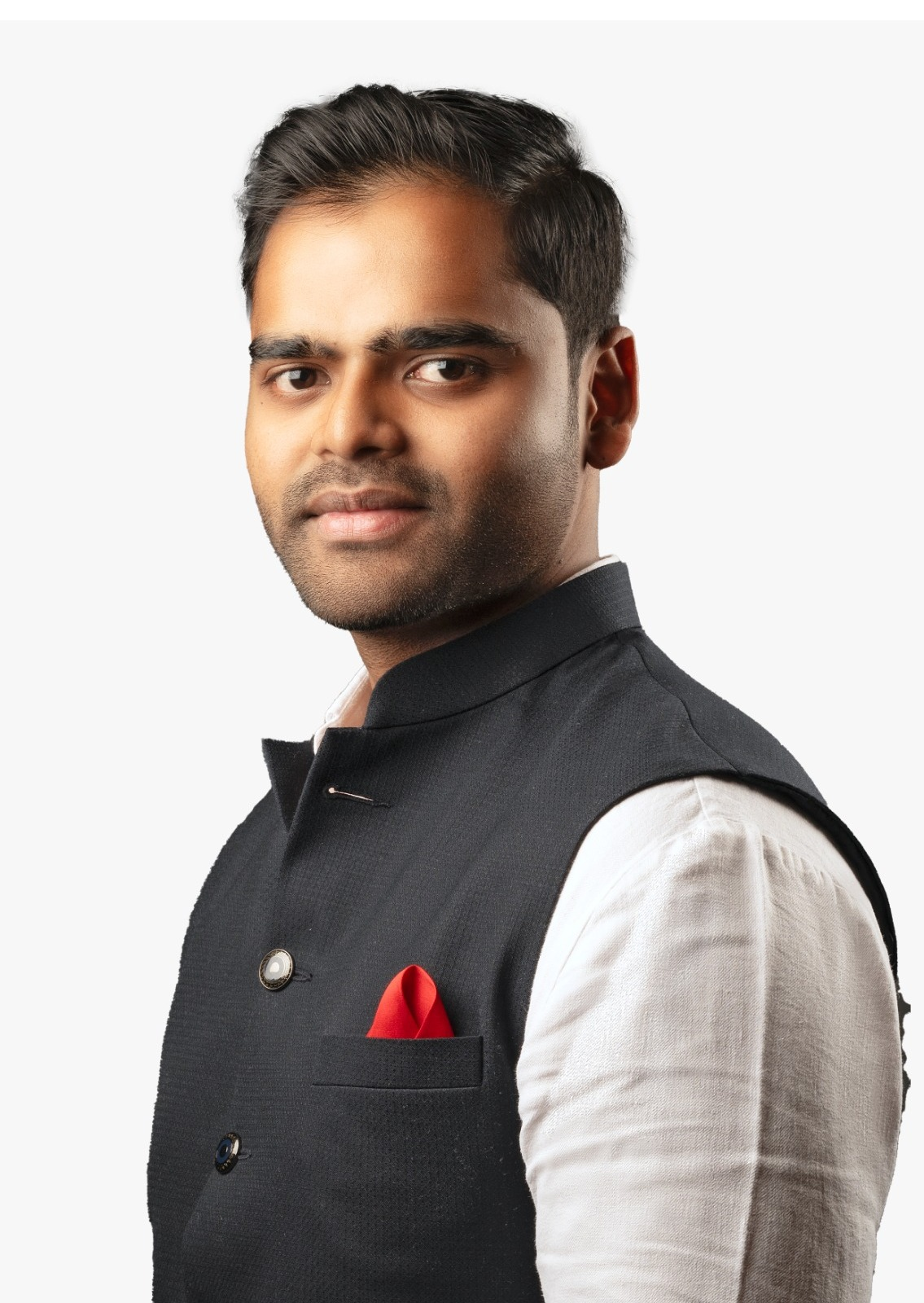

Member of Parliament, Lok Sabha
- Incumbent
- Assumed office June 2024
- Preceded by: Vinod Sonkar
- Constituency: Kaushambi

Personal details
- Born: 1 March 1999 (age 27) Allahabad, Uttar Pradesh, India
- Party: Samajwadi Party
- Parent(s): Indrajit Saroj, Pushpa Devi
- Education: Welham Boys School Queen Mary University of London
- Occupation: Politician

Pushpendra Saroj (born 1 March 1999) is an Indian politician who is the current Member of Parliament from Kaushambi Lok Sabha constituency. He is a member of the Samajwadi Party. He is currently India's youngest MP, breaking the record of Chandrani Murmu.

== Early life and education ==
He is the son of Indrajit Saroj, the national general secretary of Samajwadi Party. He attended Welham Boys' School. He graduated from Queen Mary University of London in 2019 with a degree in Accounting and Management.

== See also ==
- 18th Lok Sabha

Lok Sabha
Preceded by Vinod Sonkar	Member of Parliament for Kaushambi; 2024–present	Incumbent
Honorary titles
Preceded by Chandrani Murmu	Baby of the House; 2024–present	Incumbent
