= Vinod Sonkar =

Indian politician

Vinod Kumar Sonkar
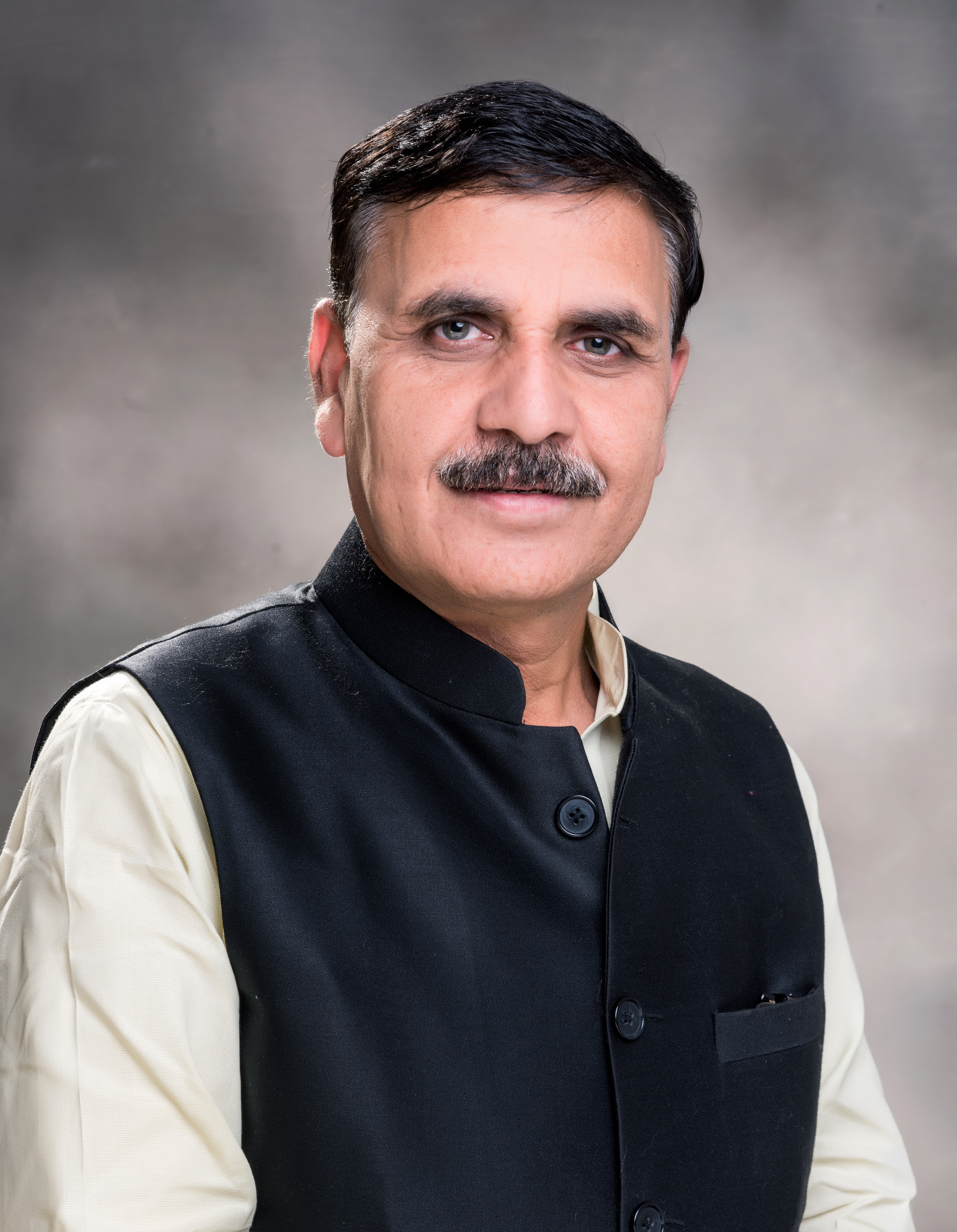

Member of Parliament, Lok Sabha
- In office 16 May 2014 – 5 June 2024
- Appointed By: Amit Shah
- Preceded by: Shailendra Kumar
- Succeeded by: Pushpendra Saroj
- Constituency: Kaushambi

National President of Bharatiya Janata Party SC Morcha
- In office 10 October 2017 – October 2020
- Preceded by: Sanjay Paswan
- Succeeded by: Lal Singh Arya

Personal details
- Born: 18 February 1970 (age 56) Sadiyapur, Uttar Pradesh, India
- Party: Bharatiya Janata Party
- Spouse: Smt. Sangeeta Sonkar
- Children: 2
- Education: Allahabad University
- Occupation: Trader
- Website: https://www.vinodsonkar.in
- As of 17 December, 2016

Vinod Kumar Sonkar is an Indian politician, a member of the Bharatiya Janata Party. He was the Member of Parliament from Kaushambi, Uttar Pradesh, from 2014 to 2024. During his tenure as Member of Parliament, he served as the chairperson of the Lok Sabha parliamentary committee on Ethics. He has also served as a National secretary of the Bharatiya Janata Party.

== Early life and education ==
Vinod Kumar Sonkar was born on 18 February 1970 to Shri Amar Nath Sonkar and Smt. Champa Devi. He was born in Sadiyapur, located in Prayagraj district in Uttar Pradesh. Sonkar completed his graduation from Allahabad University. He married Sangeeta Sonkar on 22 May 2002.

== Political career ==
- May 2014: Elected to 16th Lok Sabha
- 1 September 2014 onwards: Member, Standing Committee on Commerce; Member, Consultative Committee, Ministry of Petroleum and Natural Gas
- 30 July 2017 Vice president BJP Uttar Pradesh unit (till July 2019)
- 10 October 2017: term started for National president, BJP (S.C. morcha) until October 2020.
- May 2019: Elected again to the 17th Lok Sabha
- 9 October 2019 onwards: Chairman of Ethics committee
- October 2020: National Secretary BJP
- November 2020: Incharge Tripura BJP
- June 2024: Lost re-election for the 18th Lok Sabha to Pushpendra Saroj.
