= Manjhanpur Assembly constituency =

Constituency of the Uttar Pradesh legislative assembly in India

Coordinates: 25.53°N 81.38°E

Manjhanpur
- Constituency No. 252 for the Uttar Pradesh Legislative Assembly

Constituency details
- Country: India
- Region: North India
- State: Uttar Pradesh
- District: Kaushambi
- Total electors: 4,16,731
- Reservation: SC

Member of Legislative Assembly
- 18th Uttar Pradesh Legislative Assembly
- Incumbent Indrajit Saroj
- Party: Samajwadi Party
- Elected year: 2022

Manjhanpur is a constituency of the Uttar Pradesh Legislative Assembly covering the city of Manjhanpur in the Kaushambi district of Uttar Pradesh, India.

Manjhanpur is one of five assembly constituencies in the Kaushambi Lok Sabha constituency. Since 2008, this assembly constituency is numbered 252 amongst 403 constituencies.

This seat belonged to Bharatiya Janta Party candidate Lal Bahadur who won in last Assembly election of 2017 Uttar Pradesh Legislative Elections defeating Bahujan Samaj Party candidate Indrajeet Saroz by a margin of 4,160 votes.

== Members of the Legislative Assembly ==
| Election | Name | Party |
|---|---|---|
| 1977 | Nathu Ram Shikshak | Janata Party |
| 1980 | Ishwar Sharan Vidyarthi | Indian National Congress |
| 1985 | Ishwar Sharan Vidyarthi | Indian National Congress |
| 1989 | Ishwar Sharan Vidyarthi | Indian National Congress |
| 1991 | Bhagwant Prasad | Janata Dal |
| 1996 | Indrajit Saroj | Bahujan Samaj Party |
| 2002 | Indrajit Saroj | Bahujan Samaj Party |
| 2007 | Indrajit Saroj | Bahujan Samaj Party |
| 2012 | Indrajit Saroj | Bahujan Samaj Party |
| 2017 | Lal Bahadur Chaudhary | Bharatiya Janata Party |
| 2022 | Indrajit Saroj | Samajwadi Party |

== Election results ==
=== 2027 ===
2027 Uttar Pradesh Legislative Assembly election: Manjhanpur
| Party | Candidate | Votes | % | ±% |
|---|---|---|---|---|
| INDIA | | | | |
| NDA | | | | |
| BSP | | | | |
| NOTA | None of the above | | | |
| Majority | | | | |
| Turnout | | | | |
| gain from | | Swing | | |

=== 2022 ===
2022 Uttar Pradesh Legislative Assembly election: Manjharpur
| Party | Candidate | Votes | % | ±% |
|---|---|---|---|---|
| SP | Indrajit Saroj | 121,506 | 47.2 | +32.12 |
| BJP | Lal Bahadur | 97,628 | 37.93 | −3.57 |
| BSP | Neetu Kanojia | 25,430 | 9.88 | −29.76 |
| INC | Arun Kr Vidyarthi | 3,524 | 1.37 | |
| Jan Adhikar Party | Laakhan Singh Rajpasi | 2,826 | 1.1 | |
| NOTA | None of the above | 2,815 | 1.09 | −0.71 |
| Majority | | 23,878 | 9.27 | +7.41 |
| Turnout | | 257,411 | 61.77 | +2.67 |
| SP gain from BJP | | Swing | | |

=== 2017 ===
2017 Uttar Pradesh Legislative Assembly Election: Manjhanpur
| Party | Candidate | Votes | % | ±% |
|---|---|---|---|---|
| BJP | Lal Bahadur | 92,818 | 41.5 | |
| BSP | Indrajeet Saroj | 88,658 | 39.64 | |
| SP | Hemant Kumar Tunnu | 33,717 | 15.08 | |
| NOTA | None of the above | 3,949 | 1.8 | |
| Majority | | 4,160 | 1.86 | |
| Turnout | | 223,633 | 59.1 | |
