= Manauri railway station =

Railway station in Uttar Pradesh

Manauri

General information
- Location: Railway Colony, Manauri bajar, Prayagraj, Uttar Pradesh; India
- Coordinates: 25.4705°N 81.6609°E
- Elevation: 105 metres (344 ft)
- Owner: Indian Railways
- Operator: North Central Railway
- Platforms: 2
- Tracks: 4

Construction
- Structure type: At

Other information
- Status: Functional
- Station code: MRE
- Zone(s): North Central Railway
- Division(s): Allahabad
Location
- Location within India Location within Uttar Pradesh

Manauri railway station is situated in Manauri bajar, Prayagraj district, Uttar Pradesh, India. Its station code is MRE. It is one of the major railway stations for Kaushambi district and west area of Prayagraj district.

The footfall and revenue generated at Manauri station has led to its grade being upgraded in the NSG list of railway stations, now it is ranked in NSG-5 of the Railways.

Permanent Way Training Center of Prayagraj Division, NCR is situated here.

== Trains ==
The following are some trains that pass through Manauri railway station:

- Sangam Express
- Allahabad–Kanpur Central MEMU (64591/64592)
- Chauri Chaura Express
