= Manauri bajar =

Manauri
- Town
- Country: India
- State: Uttar Pradesh
- District: Prayagraj district

Manauri is a Census Town of Prayagraj, Uttar Pradesh state of India. It is a market, 4km away from Prayagraj Metropolitan Area 18 km west of Prayagraj city headquarter. It lies on the border of Prayagraj and Kaushambi district of Uttar Pradesh. A railway station lying nearby on the New Delhi - Howrah main line and an Air Force Station nearby on NH-2 are named after this town. Due to the town's proximity to the main railway line and National highway, it has developed into a local trade market. The town has a population of over 15,000, both of Hindus and Muslims. The main occupation is grains, vegetable and fruits agriculture along with traditional works like metal works, blacksmith, carpenter, glass works, and construction labours. In Prayagraj Maha Yojna 2031, Manauri railway station and its surrounding areas like Manauri Bazaar, Puramufti, Sallahpur, Manauri Air Force (approximately 1 lakh population) will become part of Prayagraj Municipal Corporation, Prayagraj inner ring road will also pass through Manauri area.Prayagraj Mahayojana 2031

== History of Manauri ==
According to local folklore and linguistic history, the word 'Manauri' is believed to have originated from 'Mahanuri' or 'Manahuri'—terms that, in the local Awadhi dialect, signified a 'Mahua market'(Madhuca indica Plant). This name had been in use here for centuries. However, during the British era—specifically around 1859, when the Prayagraj-Kanpur railway line was constructed and a station was established here—the British administration officially recorded the name as 'Manauri'. They chose this spelling for administrative convenience and ease of pronunciation, basing it on the 'h' sound that had faded from usage over time.

== Transportation ==
=== Roadways ===
Manauri bajar is well connected to Prayagraj and Kaushambi and other city by road. It situated in NH-2 (between Prayagraj and kanpur) and SH-95 (Till Sarai Aqil, Kaushambi). It serve the large number of Auto rickshaw and Buses for Prayagraj city and Kaushambi.

=== Railways ===
The Manauri railway station is on the Prayagraj –Kanpur route. It is One of the major Railway stations for Kaushambi district

Prayagraj Junction railway station is Nearest railway junction is well connected by Auto rickshaw and buses.

=== Airways ===
The Nearest Airport is Prayagraj Airport is 8.0 km. It connect to major cities of India.

== Demographics ==
As of 2011 India census, Manauri had population of 15,265 of which 8,000+ are males while 7,500+ are females as per report released by Census India 2011.

The population of children aged 0-6 is 1500+ which is 10.01% of total population of Manauri. In Manauri Census, the female sex ratio is 930 against state average of 912. Moreover the child sex ratio in Manauri Sult is around 901 compared to Uttar Pradesh state average of 902. literacy rate of Manauri Sult city is 85.32% higher than the state average of 67.68%. In Manauri, male literacy is around 90.53% while the female literacy rate is 79.75%.

Manauri Census has many villages Madpur, Mahmoodpur north, Nayaganj, Mahmoodpur south, Mahmoodpur east, Mahmoodpur west, Manauri Gav, Janka, Takiganj, sallahpur, bihka, Puramufti, koilaha, Dihva to which it supplies basic amenities like water and sewerage. It is also authorize to build roads within Census Town limits and impose taxes on properties coming under its jurisdiction.

== Historical Ramleela, Wrestling & Dusshera Mela ==
The Ramlila performance and Dussehra fair organized by the Shri Ramlila Committee of Manauri Bazaar are deeply historic, having continued uninterrupted since the British era. Situated on the border of Prayagraj and Kaushambi, the event receives enthusiastic support and cooperation from the police administrations and local residents of both districts.

=== Some notable and historical facts about Manauri's Ramlila, Dussehra Fair and Historical Wrestling ===
Commencement with the Mukut Pujan: Every year, the grand 12-day Ramlila performance traditionally begins on the first day of Navratri with the Mukut Pujan(worship of the crown).

Artistic Tableaux: During Dussehra, around 16 magnificent and artistic tableaux (Jhankis)—symbolizing Lord Rama's victory—are taken out in procession, serving as a major attraction for the entire region.

3-Day Dussehra Fair: A grand three-day Dussehra fair is held during the final stages of the Ramlila enactment, drawing thousands of visitors from far and wide.

Grand Wrestling Competition: Another major highlight of this traditional Dussehra fair in Manauri is the grand Dangal (wrestling) competition, in which renowned wrestlers participate.

== Education ==
There are Hindi Medium and English Medium Schools.

List of Colleges/Schools in Manauri:

- Kendriya Vidyalaya, Manauri
- Airforce school, Manauri
- Public Inter College
