= Apna Dal (Kamerawadi) =

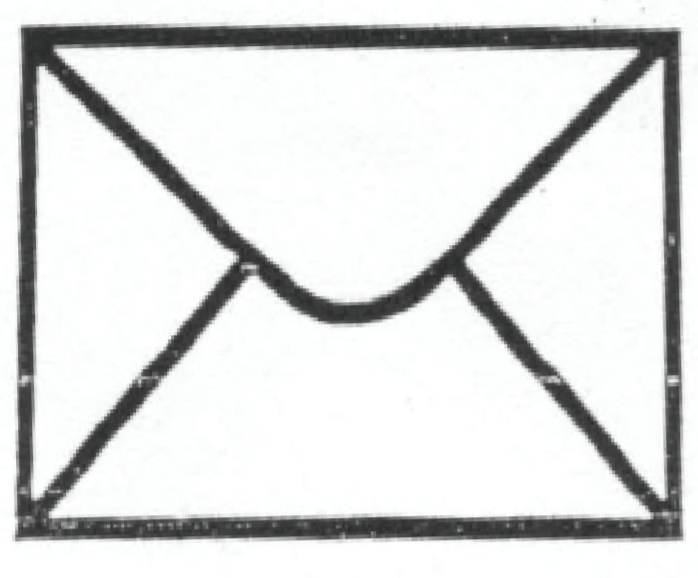
- Abbreviation: AD(K)
- President: Krishna Patel
- Founder: Chaudhary Balihari Patel; Sone Lal Patel
- Founded: 4 November 1995 (30 years ago)
- Headquarters: 126/17-B, B. N. Road Lalbagh, Lucknow, Uttar Pradesh, India
- Ideology: Social justice Women's rights Inclusive Governance
- National affiliation: SP+ (2021–2024) INDIA (2023–2024) PDM (2024–present)
- Colours: Orange/Blue
- Seats in Uttar Pradesh Legislative Assembly: 1 / 403

Party flag

Apna Dal (Kamerawadi) is an Indian political party active in the state of Uttar Pradesh.

== Founding ==
Apna Dal was founded on 4 November 1995 by Sone Lal Patel and Chaudhary Balihari Patel (Chaudhary Sahab). They had been close associates of Dalit leader Kanshi Ram,

However, Kanshi Ram started giving great importance to his young female protégée, Mayawati, to the disappointment of many other party workers who had worked very hard to build the BSP. Mayawati's arrogant attitude was also resented by them. Matters came to a head in 1995 when for the first time, the BSP got the chance to head a coalition government in Uttar Pradesh, and Kanshi Ram chose Mayawati to be the Chief Minister.

The government headed by Mayawati was extremely short-lived (June to October 1995), but the internal pressure that had built up in the party during this time was enough to cause many people to leave the BSP and form a new political party.

That party was the Apna Dal, founded by Chaudhary Balihari Patel and Dr. Sone Lal Patel in November 1995, less than three weeks after the collapse of the Mayawati government. In contrast to the BSP, which had projected itself principally as the champion of the dalits, the new party sought to project itself as a party of all castes and religions. To symbolize this, the flag of Apna Dal has two colors: saffron and blue.

Saffron is the color of Hinduism, while blue is increasingly regarded as the color of the dalits and Ambedkarites. The Election Commission has officially assigned "cup and saucer" as the party symbol for Apna Dal, to be used while contesting elections.

== Track record ==
=== Under Sone Lal Patel ===
Apna Dal made a mark in the Varanasi-Mirzapur region, the hometown of Sone Lal Patel. The party organized its first "maha-rally" at Beniabag in Varanasi where hundreds of thousands of people were present. On 23 August 1999, during the BJP government of Kalyan Singh, several hundred protesting workers of the party were beaten up by the police.

However, the party's electoral record was patchy. In 2002, seven years after the party was founded, politician Atiq Ahmed won the state assembly elections from Allahabad constituency as an Apna Dal candidate. The party failed to win any seats in the 2009 Indian general election or the 2007 Uttar Pradesh assembly elections.

=== Under Anupriya Patel ===
In October 2009, Dr. Sone Lal Patel died in a car crash only twenty days after his elder daughter Anupriya Patel Singh married Ashish Singh, an aspiring politician. His widow, Krishna Patel, took charge of the party as party president and carried its work forward. During these years, her elder daughter Anupriya Patel Singh and son-in-law Ashish Singh have also worked for the party and, according to family and party sources, they have made strong efforts to take charge of the party, which has been resisted by Krishna Singh and other family members.

In the 2012 Uttar Pradesh assembly elections, the party tasted electoral success when Anupriya Patel Singh, elder daughter of the party's founder, won the assembly election seat from Rohaniya constituency near Varanasi. The party had tied up for this election with other smaller groups such as the Peace Party of India, a local Muslim-oriented party.

Two years later, the party found it opportune to abandon its Muslim electoral partners and seek an alliance with the Bhartiya Janata Party, which was clearly on the upswing in the state. On 25 March 2014, the Apna Dal became part of the National Democratic Alliance and announced its electoral arrangement: it would contest two seats (Mirzapur and Pratapgarh) as part of the NDA, and would extend support to the BJP in all other constituencies in Uttar Pradesh. Thanks to this alliance, Apna Dal won both of the above seats in the 2014 general elections handsomely. While Harivansh Singh won from Pratapgarh, Anupriya Patel Singh won from Mirzapur. At the same time, Rakesh Kumar Verma of the Apna Dal won the by-election to the Vishwanathganj assembly constituency seat which was held along with the parliamentary election. For a party that had never before won a seat in parliament, and hardly any seats in the state assembly, the success which it achieved due to its alliance with the BJP was mind-boggling.

=== Rift and split within party and family ===
After winning the election to parliament from Mirzapur, Anupriya Patel Singh resigned from her state assembly seat, and therefore a by-election from Rohaniya became necessary. Anupriya wanted that her husband, Ashish Singh, should be made the party candidate for the by-election. However, the Apna Dal's governing body, headed by her mother Krishna Singh, decided that Krishna Singh should be the candidate.

This was intended to limit the influence of Anupriya and her husband in party affairs, where they were taking charge of all matters without any invitation or authorization, which was resented by Krishna Singh and her younger daughter. In the by-election which was held in October 2014, Anupriya not only failed to campaign for her mother but allegedly also worked actively to ensure her defeat.

Krishna Singh lost the election, which exacerbated the tensions and resentments within the founder's family. Immediately afterwards, Krishna removed her daughter from the post of party general secretary. The chasm widened over the next few months, and on 7 May 2015, Anupriya and six of her associates were expelled from the party for alleged anti-party activities. A party called Apna Dal (Sonelal) was registered on 14 December 2016 and has the backing of Anupriya Patel, suggesting that the Apna Dal could be heading for a split.

=== Alliances in the 2020s ===
In the 2022 Uttar Pradesh assembly elections Apna Dal (Kamerawadi) allied with the Samajwadi Party. Dr. Pallavi Patel, defeated Deputy Chief Minister Keshav Prasad Maurya, by a margin of 7,337 votes in Sirathu.

The party joined the Indian National Congress-led Indian National Developmental Inclusive Alliance (INDIA) in 2023, to oppose the Bharatiya Janata Party-dominated National Democratic Alliance. In 2024, Apna Dal (Kamerawadi) split from INDIA to form a joint alliance with All India Majlis-e-Ittehadul Muslimeen, called Pichda Dalit Muslim.
