= Rohaniya Assembly constituency =

Constituency of Uttar Pradesh Legislative Assembly

Coordinates: 25.97°N 81.38°E

Rohaniya
- Constituency No. 387 for the Uttar Pradesh Legislative Assembly

Constituency details
- Country: India
- Region: North India
- State: Uttar Pradesh
- District: Varanasi
- Total electors: 3,91,609 (2019)
- Reservation: None

Member of Legislative Assembly
- 18th Uttar Pradesh Legislative Assembly
- Incumbent Sunil Patel
- Party: AD(S)
- Alliance: NDA
- Elected year: 2022

Rohaniya is a constituency of the Uttar Pradesh Legislative Assembly covering the town of Rohaniya in the Varanasi district of Uttar Pradesh, India. It is a Patel dominant seat. The constituency number is 387. Rohaniya is one of five assembly constituencies in the Varanasi (Lok Sabha constituency). Since 2008, this assembly constituency is numbered 387 amongst 403 constituencies.

== Members of Legislative Assembly ==
Year	Member	Party
Till 2012 : Constituency did not exist
2012	Anupriya Patel	Apna Dal
2014^	Mahendra Singh Patel	Samajwadi Party
2017	Surendra Narayan Singh	Bharatiya Janata Party
2022	Sunil Patel	Apna Dal (Soneylal)

^ By-Poll

== Election results ==
=== 2027 ===
2027 Uttar Pradesh Legislative Assembly election: Rohaniya
Party	Candidate	Votes	%	±%
INDIA				
NDA				
BSP				
NOTA	None of the above			
Majority				
Turnout				
gain from		Swing		

=== 2022 ===
2022 Uttar Pradesh Legislative Assembly election: Rohaniya
Party	Candidate	Votes	%	±%
AD(S)	Sunil Patel	118,663	48.08	
AD(K)	Abhay Patel	72,191	29.25	
BSP	Arun Singh Patel	26,356	10.68	−2.38
INC	Rajeshwar Patel	16,785	6.8	
NOTA	None of the above	2,967	1.2	+0.25
Majority		46,472	18.83	−5.79
Turnout		246,793	60.39	−1.25
AD(S) gain from BJP		Swing		

=== 2017 ===
2017 Uttar Pradesh Legislative Assembly election: Rohaniya
Party	Candidate	Votes	%	±%
BJP	Surendra Narayan Singh	119,885	51.28	
SP	Mahendra Singh Patel	62,332	26.66	
BSP	Pramod Kumar Singh	30,531	13.06	
Independent	Krishna Patel	9,549	4.08	
Independent	Parvati Devi	2,926	1.25	
NOTA	None of the above	2,190	0.95	
Majority		57,553	24.62	
Turnout		233,782	61.64	
BJP gain from SP		Swing		

=== 2014 ===
By Election, 2014: Rohaniya
Party	Candidate	Votes	%	±%
SP	Mahendra Singh Patel	76,121	40.83	
AD(K)	Krishna Patel	61,672	33.08	
Independent	Ramakant Singh	30,078	16.13	
INC	Bhawana Patel	3,207	1.72	
SBSP	Shiv Lal Yadav	2,599	1.39	
NOTA	None of the Above	941	0.50	
Majority		14,449	7.75	
Turnout		1,86,402	51.12	
SP gain from AD(K)		Swing		

=== 2012 ===
U. P. Legislative Assembly Elections, 2012: Rohaniya
Party	Candidate	Votes	%	±%
AD(K)	Anupriya Patel	57,812	30.22	
BSP	Ramakant Singh	40,229	21.03	
SP	Manoj Rai Dhoopchandi	26,091	13.64	
BJP	Sanjay Rai	18,504	9.67	
INC	Hira Lal Maurya	18,213	9.52	
SBSP	Abhay Patel	16,138	8.44	
Majority		17,583	9.19	
Turnout		1,91,295	60.35	
AD(K) win (new seat)				
