= Babaganj Assembly constituency =

Constituency of the Uttar Pradesh legislative assembly in India

Coordinates: 25.85°N 81.56°E

Babaganj
- Constituency No. 245 for the Uttar Pradesh Legislative Assembly

Constituency details
- Country: India
- Region: North India
- State: Uttar Pradesh
- District: Pratapgarh
- Total electors: 3,19,665
- Reservation: SC

Member of Legislative Assembly
- 18th Uttar Pradesh Legislative Assembly
- Incumbent Vinod Saroj
- Party: JD(L)
- Alliance: None
- Elected year: 2022

Babaganj is a constituency of the Uttar Pradesh Legislative Assembly covering the city of Babaganj in the Pratapgarh district of Uttar Pradesh, India. Babaganj is one of five assembly constituencies in the Kaushambi Lok Sabha constituency. Since 2008, this assembly constituency is numbered 245 amongst 403 constituencies.

== Members of the Legislative Assembly ==
Year	Member	Party
Till 2012 : Constituency did not exist
2012	Vinod Saroj	Independent
2017	Vinod Saroj	Independent
2022	Vinod Saroj	Jansatta Dal (Loktantrik)

== Election results ==
=== 2027 ===
2027 Uttar Pradesh Legislative Assembly election: Babaranj
Party	Candidate	Votes	%	±%
INDIA				
NDA				
BSP				
NOTA	None of the above			
Majority				
Turnout				
gain from		Swing		

=== 2022 ===
2022 Uttar Pradesh Legislative Assembly election: Babaganj
Party	Candidate	Votes	%	±%
Jansatta Dal (L)	Vinod Saroj	67,282	40.34	
SP	Girish Pasi	51,515	30.88	
BJP	Keshav Pasi	30,391	18.22	−11.91
BSP	Sushil Kumar	8,723	5.23	−5.01
LJP(RV)	Vijay Pal Saroj	2,018	1.21	
NOTA	None of the above	1,959	1.17	−0.89
Majority		15,767	9.46	−12.67
Turnout		166,804	52.18	−2.88
Jansatta Dal (L) gain from Independent		Swing		

=== 2017 ===
Independent candidate Vinod Saroj won in last Assembly election of 2017 Uttar Pradesh Legislative Elections defeating Bharatiya Janata Party candidate Pawan Kumar by a margin of 37,160 votes.

2017 Uttar Pradesh Legislative Assembly election: Babaganj
Party	Candidate	Votes	%	±%
Independent	Vinod Saroj	87,778	52.26	
BJP	Pawan Kumar	50,618	30.13	
BSP	Daya Ram	17,205	10.24	
Independent	Ram Saran	3,351	1.99	
BMP	Sanjay Kumar	2,298	1.37	
Independent	Sitaram	1,936	1.15	
NOTA	None of the above	3,386	2.06	
Majority		37,160	22.13	
Turnout		167,975	55.06	

== See also ==
- Pratapgarh district, Uttar Pradesh
- List of constituencies of the Uttar Pradesh Legislative Assembly
