= Baij Nath Kushwaha =

Indian politician

Member of Uttar Pradesh Legislative Assembly
- In office 1974–1977
- Constituency: Sirathu Assembly constituency
- In office 1977–1980
- Constituency: Sirathu Assembly constituency

Personal details
- Born: September 1923 Uttar Pradesh
- Party: Bharatiya Kranti Dal; Janata Party

Baij Nath Prasad Kushwaha was an Indian politician based in Uttar Pradesh, who was elected to Uttar Pradesh Legislative Assembly in 1974 Uttar Pradesh Legislative Assembly election from Sirathu Assembly constituency. He was a member of Bharatiya Kranti Dal. He became a member of sixth Uttar Pradesh Legislative Assembly by getting elected in 1974.

== Life ==
Born in September 1923 to Ghisan Lal, Baijnath Kushwaha was married to Shakuntala Devi in 1944 at an early age. They had a son and four daughters from this marriage. Kushwaha was engaged in small scale trade before joining active politics through Bharatiya Kranti Dal in 1970s. He was a resident of a locality called Lukarganj in Allahabad district of Uttar Pradesh. In 1974, he was elected to Uttar Pradesh Legislative Assembly for the first time, becoming a part of 6th Uttar Pradesh Assembly.

In 1977, he contested once again in Assembly elections and became a part of 7th Uttar Pradesh Legislative Assembly by getting elected on the ticket of Janata Party.
