= Kara, Uttar Pradesh =

Town in Uttar Pradesh, India

Kara
- town
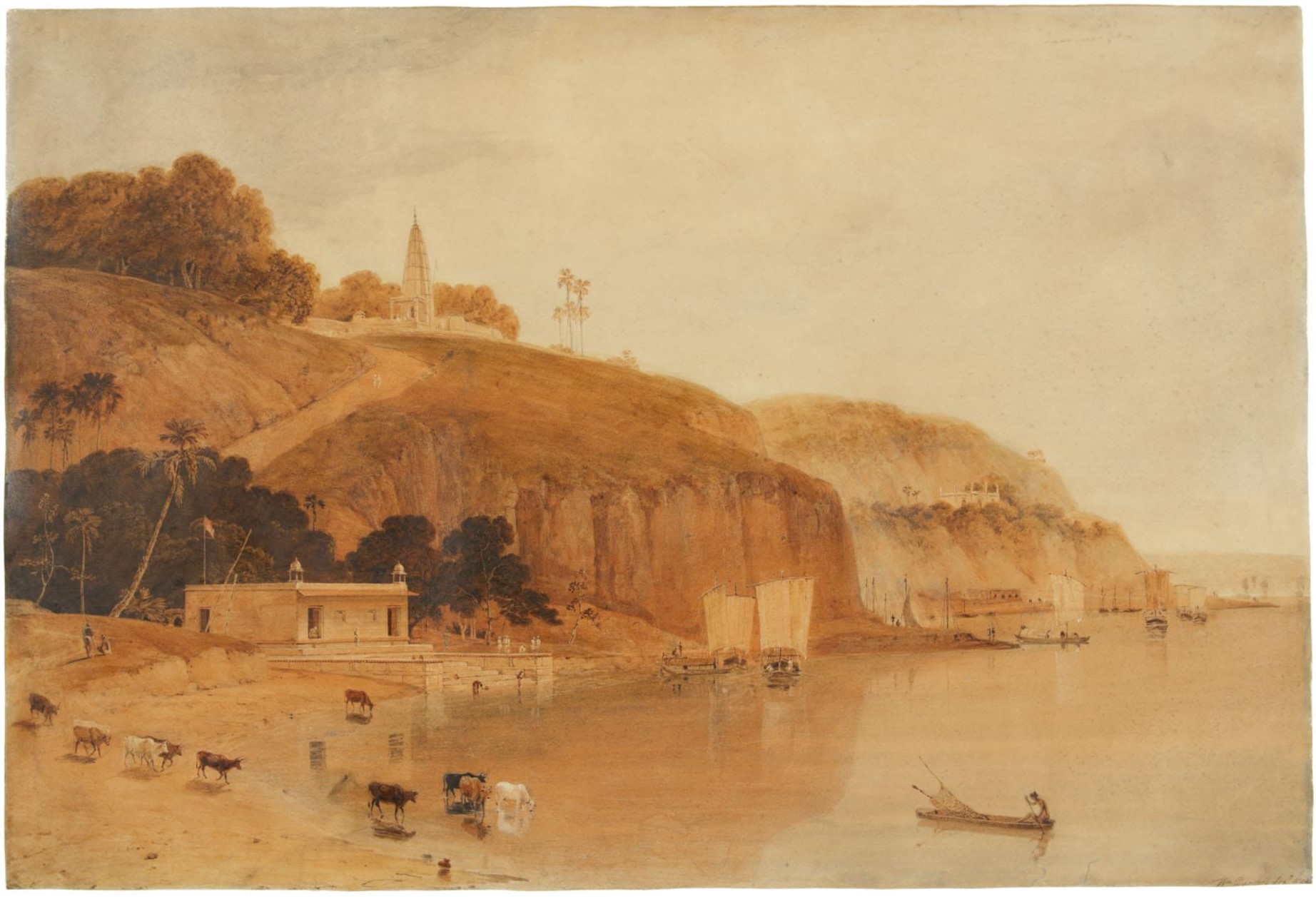
- View of the right bank of the Ganges, near Currah, December 1788, by William Daniell

- Location in Uttar Pradesh, India Kara (India)
- Coordinates: 25°42′N 81°21′E
- Country: India
- State: Uttar Pradesh
- Division: Prayagraj
- District: Kaushambi

Population (2020)
  - Total: 293,620

Languages
  - Official: Hindi
- Time zone: UTC+5:30 (IST)
- Vehicle registration: UP
- Website: up.gov.in

Kara is a township near Sirathu on the banks the Ganges, 69 km (43 mi) west of the city of Prayagraj in Kaushambi district in Uttar Pradesh state in India. It was a regional capital for centuries under the Delhi Sultanate and Jaunpur Sultanate. It was part of medieval Kara-Manikpur.
