= Prayagraj division =

Administrative division of Uttar Pradesh, India

Prayagraj division Allahabad division
- Division
- Coordinates (Prayagraj (city)): 25.4500°N 81.8500°E
- Country: India
- State: Uttar Pradesh

Government
  - Divisional Commissioner: Sanjay Goyal, IAS

Prayagraj division, formerly and colloquially known as Allahabad division, is one of the 18 administrative geographical units (i.e. division) of the northern Indian state of Uttar Pradesh, with the city of Prayagraj being the administrative divisional headquarters.

In 2000, when Uttar Pradesh was reorganised by forming Uttaranchal out of its northern areas, Allahabad division and the district was majorly reorganised too. The Etawah, Farrukhabad, Kanpur Nagar and Kanpur Dehat districts of the Allahabad division were made into a separate Kanpur division. Parts of the western areas of Allahabad district were carved out to create a new district named Kaushambi. At the same time, Pratapgarh district, that falls in the Awadh region, was included in the Allahabad division.

Since 2000, Prayagraj/Allahabad division consists of the following districts:-

- Fatehpur
- Kaushambi
- Pratapgarh
- Prayagraj (Allahabad until 2018)

Prior to 2000, Allahabad division consisted of all the districts of the lower Doab:-

- Allahabad
- Etawah
- Farrukhabad
- Fatehpur
- Kanpur

== Languages ==
Prayagraj division: mother-tongue of population, according to the 2011 Census.
Mother tongue code	Mother tongue	People per district				Prayagraj division	
Mother tongue code	Mother tongue	Fatehpur	Pratapgarh	Kaushambi	Prayagraj	people	percentage
001002	Assamese	1	0	0	319	320	0.002%
002007	Bengali	48	308	46	6,782	7,184	0.054%
004001	Dogri	0	0	0	170	170	0.001%
005018	Gujarati	6	0	0	298	304	0.002%
006030	Awadhi	0	193,030	1,199	110,468	304,697	2.275%
006042	Bagheli/Baghel Khandi	0	0	0	920	920	0.007%
006102	Bhojpuri	2	428	2,645	8,946	12,021	0.090%
006142	Chhattisgarhi	0	1,198	0	1,135	2,333	0.017%
006235	Haryanvi	0	0	0	128	128	0.001%
006240	Hindi	2,566,474	2,911,957	1,576,776	5,651,508	12,706,715	94.856%
006311	Khari Boli (Kauravi)	160	14	0	59	233	0.002%
006400	Marwari	0	1	0	130	131	0.001%
006489	Rajasthani	37	0	0	149	186	0.001%
007016	Kannada	4	0	0	348	352	0.003%
010008	Maithili	0	0	0	294	294	0.002%
011016	Malayalam	19	26	7	1,016	1,068	0.008%
013071	Marathi	6	9	3	1,519	1,537	0.011%
014011	Nepali	19	8	5	379	411	0.003%
015043	Odia	4	260	328	1,172	1,764	0.013%
016038	Punjabi	152	363	9	3,328	3,852	0.029%
019014	Sindhi	0	42	0	635	677	0.005%
020027	Tamil	6	5	0	685	696	0.005%
021046	Telugu	6	0	0	843	849	0.006%
022015	Urdu	65,600	100,588	17,670	159,916	343,774	2.566%
022016	Bhansari	0	159	440	0	599	0.004%
028001	Arabic/Arbi	4	140	18	481	643	0.005%
030073	Tadavi	0	0	0	411	411	0.003%
040001	English	59	181	46	487	773	0.006%
N.A.	Others	126	424	404	1,865	2,819	0.021%
Total		2,632,733	3,209,141	1,599,596	5,954,391	13,395,861	100.000%

== See also ==
- Districts of Uttar Pradesh
