= Ashish Singh Patel =

Indian politician

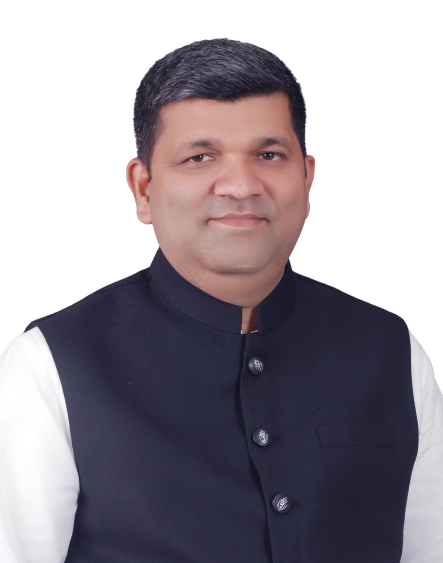

Minister of Technical Education, Consumer Protection, Weights and Measures, Government of Uttar Pradesh
- Incumbent
- Assumed office 25 March 2022
- Chief Minister: Yogi Adityanath

Member of the Uttar Pradesh Legislative Council
- Incumbent
- Assumed office 6 May 2018
- Constituency: elected by Legislative Assembly members

Personal details
- Party: Apna Dal (Sonelal)
- Spouse: Anupriya Patel (m. 2009)
- Education: Bundelkhand Institute of Engineering & Technology

Ashish Singh Patel is an Indian politician currently serving as Cabinet minister, Government of Uttar Pradesh. He is the minister for Technical Education, Consumer Protection, and Weights and Measures and also member of the Uttar Pradesh Legislative Council. He is a working president of the Apna Dal (Sonelal) party and husband of Minister of State in the Ministry of Commerce and Industry Anupriya Patel. He completed his B.tech. in Civil Engineering from Bundelkhand Institute of Engineering & Technology Jhansi.
