= Vinod Saroj =

Indian politician

Vinod Kumar Saroj

Member of Uttar Pradesh Legislative Assembly
- Incumbent
- Assumed office 2012
- Preceded by: Himself
- Constituency: Babaganj
- In office 2007–2012
- Preceded by: Ramnath Saroj
- Succeeded by: Himself
- Constituency: Bihar(Uttar pradesh)

Personal details
- Born: 1 July 1980 (age 46)
- Party: Jansatta Dal (Loktantrik)
- Other political affiliations: Independent(2007-2018)
- Children: 1 son and 2 daughters
- Parent: Ramnath Saroj (ex-mla)
- As of 17 July, 2013

Vinod Kumar Saroj (born 1 July 1980) is a politician from Bela Pratapgarh, India. Since 2007, he has been elected on three occasions as an independent Member of the Legislative Assembly, representing the Babaganj assembly constituency of Pratapgarh, Uttar Pradesh.

== Education and background ==
Saroj was born on 1 July 1980 in Pratapgarh. He is son of Ramnath Saroj, who won assembly elections in 1996 and 2002 for Bihar constituency of Pratapgarh.

== Career ==
Vinod Saroj was elected as a legislator for the first time in 2007 from the Bihar Assembly constituency by a margin of 47.22% votes, defeating nearest Bahujan Samaj Party's candidate Krishna Chand. In Uttar Pradesh assembly elections, 2012, Saroj was re-elected as MLA but from Babaganj assembly constituency and defeated BJP's Mahendra Kumar. He won by a margin of 42060 votes in 2012.

== See also ==
- List of people from Pratapgarh
