= Sone Lal Patel =

Indian politician (1950–2009)

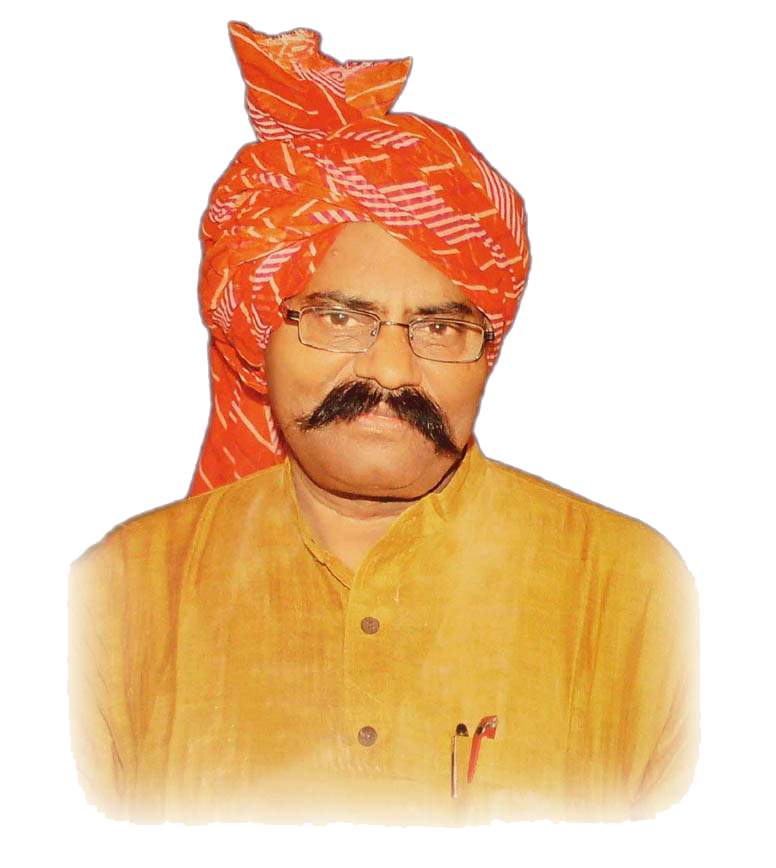
- Patel in 1999
- Born: 2 July 1950; Kannauj, Uttar Pradesh, India
- Died: 18 October 2009 (aged 59); Kanpur, Uttar Pradesh, India
- Occupation: Politician
- Political party: Apna Dal
- Other political affiliations: Bahujan Samaj Party
- Spouse: Krishna Patel
- Children: 4, including Anupriya Patel and Pallavi Patel

Sone Lal Patel (2 July 1950 – 18 October 2009) was an Indian politician active in the state of Uttar Pradesh. He was the founder of the political party Apna Dal.

He staunchly opposed casteism and fought against social inequality.

== Early life ==
Sone Lal Patel was born on 2 July 1950 in Bagulihai village, Kannauj district, into a Kurmi Hindu family. He obtained an MSc from Pandit Prithi Nath College, Kanpur, and held a doctorate in physics from Kanpur University. From an early age, he was a vocal critic of casteism and social inequality prevalent in society. He advocated for social justice and equality.

== Political career ==
=== Early political career ===
Patel embarked on his political journey by joining hands with Chaudhary Charan Singh, actively participating in protests and rallies against social inequality and caste exploitation across the state and other parts of the country. He even endured police brutality during one such protest.

=== Meeting Kanshiram and BSP ===
Patel's path crossed with Kanshi Ram, who was striving to create a social justice movement in North India. Their visions regarding caste-based discrimination and social injustice aligned to a great extent. At the behest of Kanshi Ram, Patel played a significant role in the establishment of the Bahujan Samaj Party. He is credited as one of the founders of BSP.

=== Parting with BSP and founding Apna Dal ===
Due to dissatisfaction with the resolution and objectives of BSP, he separated from the party. One of the reasons for his disillusionment was Kanshi Ram's overwhelming support for Mayawati while ignoring other leaders.

Driven by his commitment to social causes, Patel founded Apna Dal party on 4 November 1995. He contested the Lok Sabha elections in 2009 from Phulpur (Lok Sabha constituency) getting 76,699 votes and ranking third in the constituency.

== Death and aftermath ==
Sone Lal Patel died in a road accident in Kanpur in 2009. His daughter, Anupriya Patel, demanded a CBI probe into the incident.

After his demise, his wife, Krishna Patel, assumed the role of the National President of Apna Dal. His daughter, Anupriya Patel, was elected to the Lok Sabha in 2014 from Mirzapur (Lok Sabha constituency). Subsequently, the party split, and Anupriya Patel formed her own party named 'Apna Dal (Sonelal)', winning from Mirzapur again in 2019 in coalition with the Bharatiya Janata Party.
