= Apna Dal (Soneylal) =

- Abbreviation: AD(S)
- President: Anupriya Patel
- Spokesperson: Rajesh Patel
- Founder: Anupriya Patel
- Founded: 14 December 2016 (9 years ago)
- Headquarters: 1A, Sarva Palli, The Mall Avenue, Lucknow, Uttar Pradesh
- Ideology: Social justice Kurmi rights Regionalism
- National affiliation: NDA (2016 – present)
- Colours: Orange; Blue
- ECI Status: State Party
- Rajya Sabha: 0 / 245
- Lok Sabha: 1 / 543
- Uttar Pradesh Legislative Council: 1 / 100
- Uttar Pradesh Legislative Assembly: 13 / 403

Election symbol
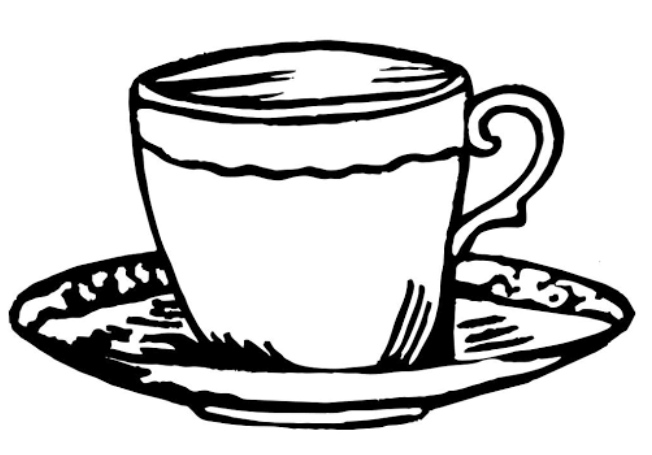

Party flag

Apna Dal (Soneylal) (abbreviated as AD(S); translation: Our Party (Soneylal)) is a state-level Indian political party. President of the party is Anupriya Patel, and vice president is Mata Badal Tiwari.

The party has 13 MLA in the Uttar Pradesh Legislative Assembly. Apna Dal is the third largest political party in Uttar Pradesh in terms of number of MLAs.

== History ==
The Apna Dal (Sonelal) is a breakaway party of Apna Dal which was founded in 1995 by Sone Lal Patel, Apna Dal (Sonelal) founded by "Jawahar Lal Patel" who was also founding member of Apna Dal and had the backing of Anupriya Patel.

After winning the election to parliament seat from Mirzapur, Anupriya Patel resigned her state assembly seat and therefore a by-election from Rohaniya became necessary. Anupriya wanted that her husband, Ashish Singh Patel, should be made the party candidate for the by-election.

However, the Apna Dal's governing body, headed by her mother Krishna Singh, decided that Krishna Singh should herself be the candidate. This was intended to limit the influence of Anupriya and her husband in party affairs, where they were taking charge of all matters without any invitation or authorization, which was resented by Krishna Singh and her younger daughter. In the by-election which was held in October 2014, Anupriya not only failed to campaign for her mother, but allegedly also worked actively to ensure her defeat.

However, the Apna Dal's governing body, headed by her mother Krishna Patel, decided that Krishna Patel should herself be the candidate and Anupriya and six of her associates were expelled from the party. The dispute between Krishna Patel and Anupriya Patel over the party is still in court.

=== Assembly election (2017) ===
As part of the National Democratic Alliance, Apna Dal (Sonelal) contested Uttar Pradesh elections with the Bhartiya Janata Party and won nine seats with 851,336 votes. Jamuna Prasad won the Soraon constituency with 77,814 votes. Apna Dal (Sonelal) had won more seats than Indian National Congress, which won only seven seats.

=== Assembly election (2022) ===
As part of the National Democratic Alliance, Apna Dal (Sonelal) contested Uttar Pradesh elections with the Bhartiya Janata Party and won 12 seats with 1,493,181 votes. Apna Dal (Sonelal) had won more seats than Indian National Congress, which won only two seats. Apna Dal reached 3rd spot after Bharatiya Janata Party and Samajwadi Party in terms of number of seats in UP assembly.

=== Lok Sabha election ===
In the 2019 Indian general election, ADS joined hands with Bhartiya Janata Party and fielded two candidates Anupriya Patel Singh from Mirzapur and Pakauri Lal from Robertsganj and won both the seats.

== See also ==
- List of political parties in India
