= Bharwari =

- City
- Location in Uttar Pradesh, Northern India
- Coordinates: 25.55°N 81.5°E
- Country: India
- State: Uttar Pradesh
- District: Kaushambi

Government
  - Type: Democratic
  - Body: first election waiting
  - Rank: 7
- Elevation: 88 m (289 ft)

Population (2020)
  - Total: 17,260

Languages
  - Official: Hindi
- Time zone: UTC+5:30 (IST)
- Postal code: 212201
- Vehicle registration: UP 73

Bharwari is a small city and Municipal Board in the Kaushambi district located in the state of Uttar Pradesh, India that includes 29 villages in its surrounding area.

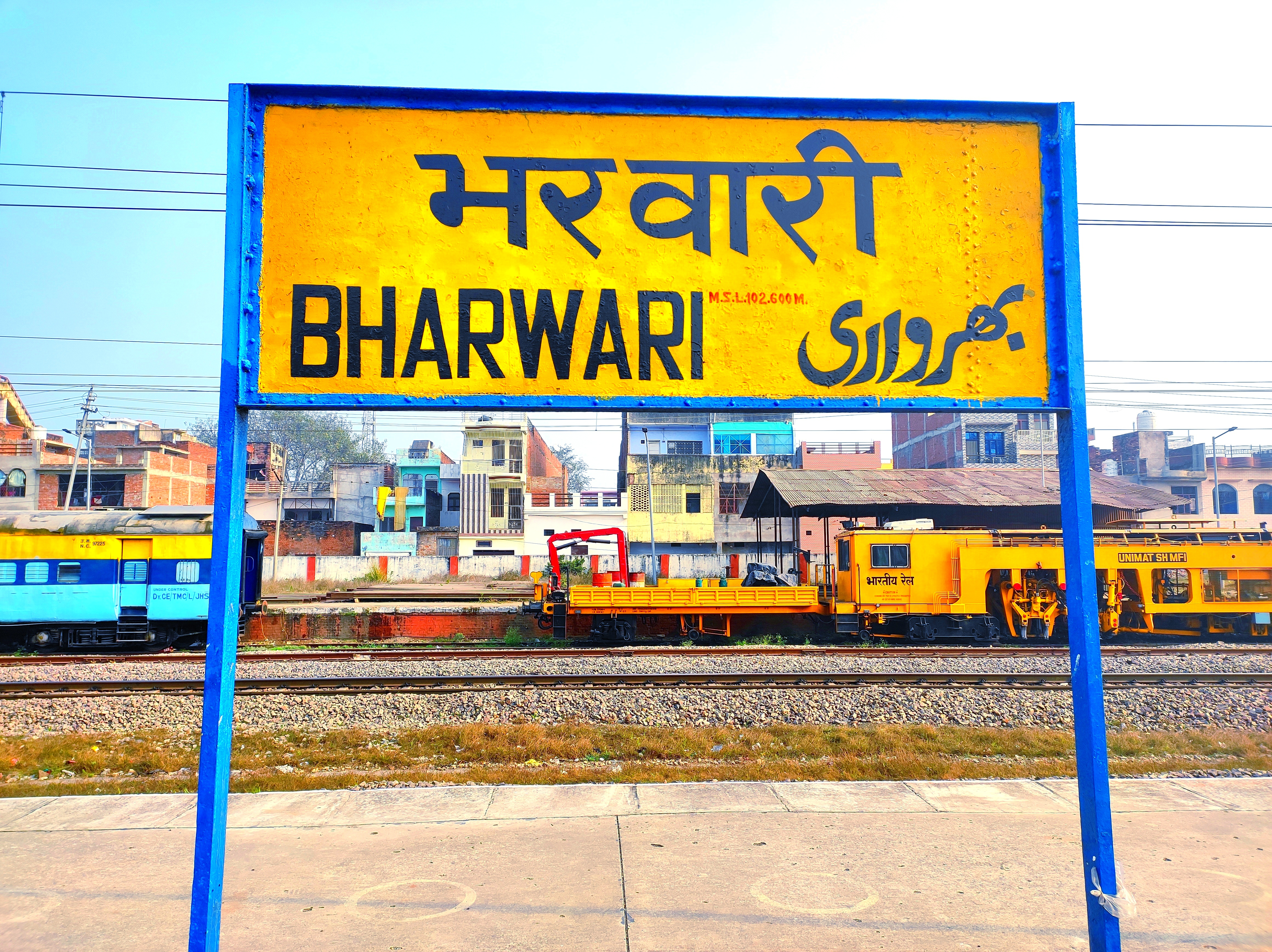

The Bharwari city is divided into 25 wards and the elections are held every five years. The Bharwari Nagar Palika has a population of 17,260 of which 8,874 are males while 8,386 are females as per report released by Census India 2011. This population consists of 72.10% Hindus, 27.22% Muslims, 0.19% Christians, 0.20% Sikhs, 0.01% Buddhists, 0.04% Jains, and 0.24% Not Stated.

The city of Bharwari is located on the National Highway 2 (NH-2), 2 km away from Kokhraj Police Station and The Ganges.

Bharwari Municipality has total administration of over 4,815 houses. These houses are supplied basic amenities like water and sewerage. The Bharwari Municipality is also authorized to build roads within the Nagar Panchayat limits and impose taxes on properties under its jurisdiction.

== Demographics ==
According to the latest Indian census of 2011, the male population of the city is 8,874 whereas the female population is 8,386 The literacy rate of Bharwari city is 76.15% higher than the state average of 67.68%. The city has an unequal literacy rate between males and females. In Bharwari, male literacy is around 82.08% while the female literacy rate is 69.95%. The population density of Bharwari is 9,181/km^{2} along with the change of +1.57%/year [2001 → 2011].

=== Caste Factor ===
Schedule Caste (SC) constitutes 8.40% of the total population in Bharwari (NP). The (NP) Bharwari currently doesn't have any Schedule Tribe (ST) population.

=== Work Profile ===
Out of the total population, 6,092 were engaged in work or business activity, among which 4,297 were males, while 1,795 were females. In the census survey, a worker is defined as a person who does a business, job, service, cultivator, or labor activity. Out of the total 6,092 working population, 70.98% were engaged in Main Work, while 29.02% of them were engaged in Marginal Work.

== Transport ==
The city is accessible by the National Highway 2 and rail. Bharwari railway station is connected to Buddh International Circuit, Mahabodhi Express, which runs from Gaya to New Delhi, and Chauri Chaura Express, which connects Sarnath (Varanasi) to Kaushambi. These trains stop in Bharwari daily. Several other express trains also stop in Bharwari, but not daily.

== Sports ==
Late Honorary Captain Mohammad Aslam Siddiqui, VSM, a renowned heavyweight international boxer, hailed from Bharwari.
