= Anupriya Patel =

Indian politician (born 1981)

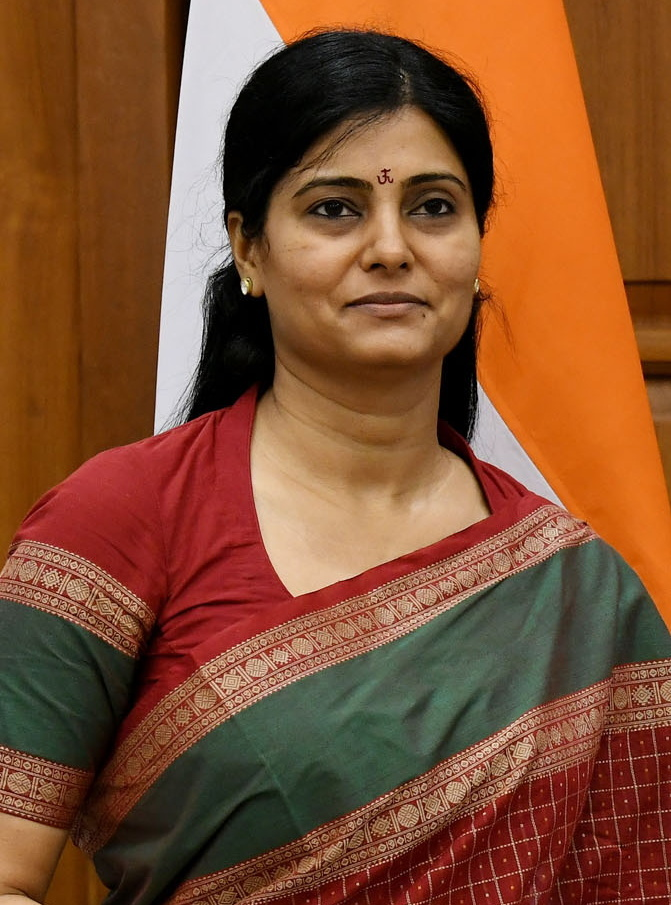
- Official portrait, 2021

Union Minister of State for Chemicals and Fertilisers
- Incumbent
- Assumed office 10 June 2024
- Minister: Jagat Prakash Nadda
- Preceded by: Bhagwanth Khuba

Union Minister of State for Health and Family Welfare
- Incumbent
- Assumed office 10 June 2024 Serving with Prataprao Ganpatrao Jadhav
- Minister: Jagat Prakash Nadda
- Preceded by: Bharati Pawar
- In office 4 July 2016 – 24 May 2019
- Minister: Jagat Prakash Nadda
- Preceded by: Faggan Singh Kulaste
- Succeeded by: Ashwani Kumar Choubey

Union Minister of State of Commerce and Industry
- In office 7 July 2021 – 10 June 2024
- Minister: Piyush Goyal
- Preceded by: Hardeep Singh Puri
- Succeeded by: Jitin Prasada

President of Apna Dal (Soneylal)
- Incumbent
- Assumed office 14 December 2016
- Preceded by: Position established

Member of Parliament, Lok Sabha
- Incumbent
- Assumed office 16 May 2014
- Preceded by: Bal Kumar Patel
- Constituency: Mirzapur, Uttar Pradesh

Member of Uttar Pradesh Legislative Assembly
- In office March 2012 – September 2014
- Preceded by: Constituency established
- Succeeded by: Mahendra Singh Patel
- Constituency: Rohaniya

Personal details
- Born: 28 April 1981 (age 45) Kanpur, Uttar Pradesh, India
- Party: Apna Dal (Soneylal)
- Other political affiliations: National Democratic Alliance (2014–present)
- Spouse: Ashish Singh Patel (m. 2009)
- Parent: Sone Lal Patel (father)
- Education: Lady Shri Ram College for Women, University of Delhi (BA), Chhatrapati Shahu Ji Maharaj University (MBA)
- Profession: Teacher; social worker; politician

Anupriya Singh Patel (born 28 April 1981) is an Indian politician, teacher and social worker from the state of Uttar Pradesh who is the president of Apna Dal (Soneylal) party since 2016 and a current minister of State for Chemicals and Fertilizers of India. She has represented Mirzapur in the Lok Sabha since 2014. She was the minister of state in the Ministry of Health and Family Welfare, government of India from 2016 to 2019. She was previously elected as a member of the Legislative Assembly for the Rohaniya constituency of the legislature of Uttar Pradesh in Varanasi, where she had fought campaigns in alliance with the Peace Party of India and the Bundelkhand Congress from 2012 to 2014.

== Life ==
Anupriya Patel is the daughter of Sone Lal Patel, who founded the Apna Dal (Sonelal) political party that is based in Uttar Pradesh. She belongs to Kurmi community. She was educated at Lady Shri Ram College for Women and Chhatrapati Shahu Ji Maharaj University, formerly Kanpur University. She has a master's degree in Psychology and also Masters in Business Administration (MBA), and has taught at Amity.

== Career ==
Patel has been president of Apna Dal since the death of her father in October 2009. In 2012, she was elected as the member of Uttar Pradesh Legislative Assembly election for the Rohaniya constituency in Varanasi.

In the2024 general election, Patel's party campaigned in alliance with the Bharatiya Janata Party, led by Narendra Modi. She was elected as Member of Parliament from Mirzapur constituency. After the election, there were rumours that the two parties would merge but Patel rejected overtures intended to result in that.

== See also ==
- Third Modi ministry

Party political offices
Preceded by post established	Leader of the Apna Dal (Sonelal) Party in the Lok Sabha; 2014–present	Incumbent
