= Sirathu =

- Town
- Location in Uttar Pradesh, India
- Coordinates: 25.65°N 81.32°E
- Country: India
- State: Uttar Pradesh
- District: Kaushambi
- Elevation: 85 m (279 ft)

Population (2011)
  - Total: 19,208

Languages
  - Official: Hindi
- Time zone: UTC+5:30 (IST)
- Vehicle registration: UP-73

Sirathu is a town and Nagar Panchayat in Kaushambi district in the Indian state of Uttar Pradesh. It is one of oldest town in Kaushambi district. The town has a population of approximately 2700.

== Transportation ==
Sirathu is well connected to big cities like Prayagraj and Kanpur by road and rail it is 60 km from Prayagraj and 140 km from Kanpur. The Sirathu railway station is on the Prayagraj–Kanpur route. Few mail or express and superfast trains halt at the Sirathu railway station, but passenger trains are quite common. Sirathu and Bharvari are two main Railway Station of Kaushambi district where superfast trains halt is given. The most common and preferred mode of transportation is via road. The national highway connects Sirathu with Prayagraj and Kanpur. State buses are most common. The nearest bus station is Saini bus station. And it is the oldest Bus Station of Kaushambi district.

== Demographics ==
As of 2011 India census, Sirathu had a population of 19,208. Males constitute 52% of the population and females 48%. Sirathu has an average literacy rate of 73%, higher than the national average of 59.5%: male literacy is 78%, and female literacy is 68%.

Sirathu is located about 60 km north-west of Allahabad and is just 15 km north-west of the district headquarters, Manjhanpur.

Pabhosa Tirtha and the historic site of Kara are the nearby places of tourist interest.

The nearest airport is at Allahabad. Sirathu Railway Station is situated on the Allahabad- Kanpur line of Northern Railways. National Highway 2 passes through Sirathu (Saini). Nearest is bus stop in Saini.

== Tourism ==
Sirathu have the tourist attraction also, Kara is the oldest town of Kaushambi district and it is 9 km far from Sirathu. You can visit and see the fort of Kara. Ganga river is also in Kara and daily so many pilgrims come here to take Ganga Bath. Mata Sheetla Temple is one of oldest temple of Kaushambi and so many Hindus come here from every part of Uttar Pradesh.
