= Kaushambi district =

Coordinates: 25.530744°N 81.377292°E

- District of Uttar Pradesh
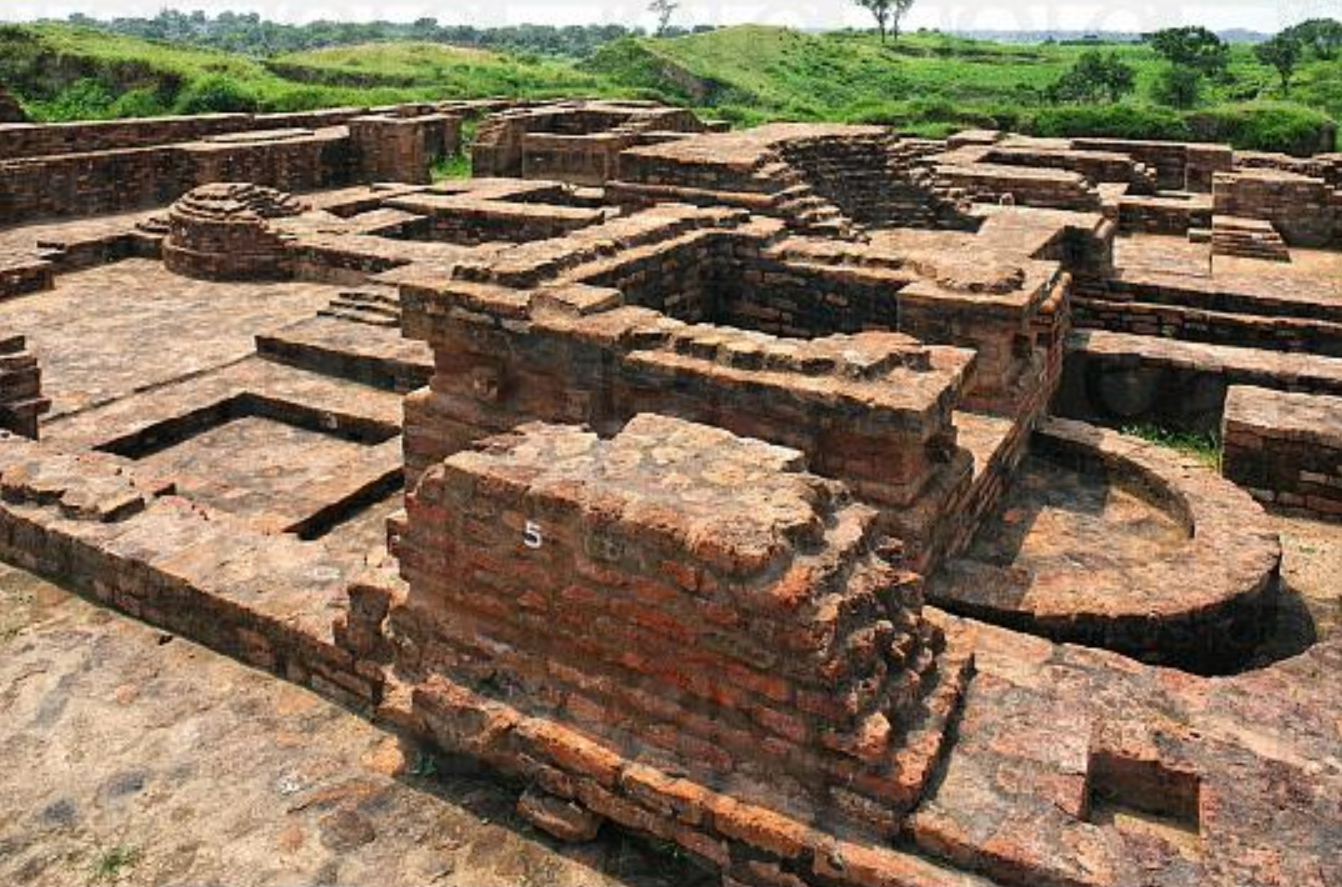
- Ruins of Ghoshtiram Buddhist monastery in Kosambi

- Location of Kaushambi district in Uttar Pradesh
- Country: India
- State: Uttar Pradesh
- Division: Prayagraj
- Headquarters: Manjhanpur
- Tehsils manjhanpur, sirathu, chail: 3

Government
  - Lok Sabha constituencies: Kaushambi (Lok Sabha constituency)
  - Vidhan Sabha constituencies: 1. Chail 2. Manjhanpur 3. Sirathu

Area
  - Total: 1,903.17 km^{2} (734.82 sq mi)

Population (2011)
  - Total: 1,599,596
  - Density: 840.490/km^{2} (2,176.86/sq mi)
  - Urban: 124,456

Demographics
  - Literacy: 63.69 %
- Time zone: UTC+05:30 (IST)
- Website: kaushambi.nic.in

Kaushambi district is a district in the state of Uttar Pradesh in India. Manjhanpur is the district headquarters. The district was carved out of Prayagraj district on 4 April 1997. Manauri Bajar connects Prayagraj and Kaushambi districts by railway over a bridge on SH-95. Manjhanpur is south-west of Prayagraj on the north bank of the Yamuna river, about 55 kilometres (34 mi) from the city. It is surrounded by Chitrakoot district on the south, Pratapgarh district on the north, Prayagraj district on the east and Fatehpur district on the west. Kaushambi is part of Prayagraj division. The nearest railway station, in Bharwari, connects with Delhi, Prayagraj, Kolkata, Gaya and Kanpur. Kaushambi district have two river like yamuna ganga.

== Mythology and history ==
Kaushambi was the capital of the ancient Indian Vatsa Mahajanapada, one of 16 such kingdoms. According to the Puranas, Vatsa was named after a Kāśī king. The Ramayana and the Mahabharata attribute the founding of its capital' Kauśāmbī, to a Chedi prince (Kuśa or Kuśāmba). The Puranas state that after Hastinapur was washed away by the Ganges, the Bharata king Nicakṣu (great-great grandson of Janamejaya), abandoned the city and settled in Kauśāmbī. This is supported by the Svapnavāsavadattā and the Pratijñā-Yaugandharāyaṇa, attributed to Bhāsa. Both described the king, Udayana, as a scion of the Bhārata family (Bhārata-kula). The Puranas contain a list of Nicakṣu’s successors which ends with the king Kṣemaka. Gautama Buddha visited Kaushambi several times during the reign of Udayana in his effort to spread the dharma, the Noble Eightfold Path and the Four Noble Truths, and Udayana was a Buddhist upāsaka. According to the Chinese translation of the Buddhist canonical text Ekottara Āgama, the first image of the Buddha (carved from sandalwood) was made at Udayana's request. The Puranas state that his four successors were Vahināra, DanḍapāṇI, Niramitra and Kṣemaka. Vatsa was later annexed by Avanti, and Maniprabha (Pradyota's great-grandson) ruled at Kauśāmbī as a prince of Avanti. Ashoka considered Kaushambi important, and placed a pillar there with inscriptions in Pali; a Jain temple was also constructed. The pillar and temple still stand, and Vatsa is being excavated by archaeologists.

Later Kaushambi was part of the many dynasties which ruled the lower Doab: the Mauryas, Shungas, Kanvas, and eventually the Guptas, during which the district was part of the region of Antarvedi. Eventually after the fall of the Guptas, the district fell under the rule of the many dynasties of Kannauj, lastly the Gurjara-Pratiharas and Gahadavalas. After 1194, the region became part of the Delhi Sultanate.

During the Sultanate period, Kara on the south bank of the Ganga in this district became an important centre of governance, and was the capital of an iqta. Kara was an important staging point for armies headed east, and was the centre of political intrigue: particularly when Alauddin Khilji assassinated his uncle here in 1296. Eventually the district was given to Malik Sarwar, who founded the Sharqi Dynasty which would rule from Jaunpur. The district was largely held by Jaunpur until the Lodis retook the territory. At the time of the Mughal conquest, Kara was held by Ibrahim Lodi's brother Jalal Khan as a virtually independent ruler. The region then fell back under Afghan control of the Suris, but was retaken by Akbar in 1559 when he conquered Awadh.

During this period Kara declined in importance as the fort of Allahabad grew in importance, although it was still the centre of a sarkar of the Allahabad Subah, of which present Kaushambi district was made. The district was relatively peaceful during Mughal rule up till the death of Aurangzeb. After his death and the general anarchy that followed, Kaushambi fell under the control of Muhammad Khan Bangash of Farrukhabad, although he had limited control and the Marathas made regular raids into the district. The district was contested between Farrukhabad and Awadh, with Awadh winning out in 1753.

After the Battle of Buxar, the region was returned to Mughal control with de-factor British control. In 1775, after the Marathas deposed Shah Alam II, the British declared the Mughals in forfeiture and sold the territory to the Nawab of Awadh. It remained under Nawab control until ceded to the British outright in 1801 in lieu of outstanding payment. It then beccame part of Allahabad district.

Kaushambi district was carved from Allahabad district on 4 April 1997. In 2006, the Ministry of Panchayati Raj named Kaushambi one of India's 250 most backward districts (out of a total of 640). It is one of the 34 districts in Uttar Pradesh receiving funds from the Backward Regions Grant Fund (BRGF).

== Demographics ==
Historical population
Year	Pop.	±% p.a.
1901	346,185	—
1911	340,788	−0.16%
1921	326,230	−0.44%
1931	346,458	+0.60%
1941	420,798	+1.96%
1951	475,525	+1.23%
1961	555,870	+1.57%
1971	644,994	+1.50%
1981	813,788	+2.35%
1991	1,021,653	+2.30%
2001	1,291,993	+2.38%
2011	1,599,596	+2.16%
source:Government of India

Religions in Kaushambi district (2011)
Religion	Percent
Hinduism	85.80%
Islam	13.78%
Other or not stated	0.42%
Distribution of religions

According to the 2011 census, Kaushambi district had a population of 1,599,596, (comparable to the population of Guinea-Bissau and the US state of Idaho); this ranks it 313th of India's 640 districts. The district has a population density of 897 inhabitants per square kilometre (2,320/sq mi). Its population growth rate from 2001 to 2011 was 23.49 percent. Kaushambi has a sex ratio of 905 females to 1,000 males, and a literacy rate of 63.69 percent. 7.78% of the population live in urban areas. Scheduled Castes make up 34.72% of the population.

Languages of Kaushambi district (2011)
1. Hindi (98.6%)
2. Urdu (1.10%)
3. Others (0.33%)

At the time of the 2011 Census of India, 98.57% of the population in the district spoke Hindi and 1.10% Urdu as their first language.

Kaushambi district: mother-tongue of population, according to the 2011 Census.
Mother tongue code	Mother tongue	People	Percentage
006030	Awadhi	1,199	0.07%
006102	Bhojpuri	2,645	0.17%
006240	Hindi	1,576,776	98.57%
015043	Odia	328	0.02%
022015	Urdu	217,670	1.10%
022016	Bhansari	440	0.03%
N.A.	Others	538	0.03%
Total		1,599,596	100.00%

== Transportation ==
Closest Airport to Kaushambi is in Prayagraj Airport which is 56 kilometers (34.7 miles) away from district headquarters and has flights to major destinations such as Delhi, Bengaluru, Mumbai, Kolkata etc.

Manjhanpur Roadways bus depot connects the headquarter by road to all major cities and towns.

Major railway station is in neighboring Prayagraj (56 km). Kaushambi district also has several railway stations:

- Sirathu railway station, Sirathu, it is the nearest railway station for constituency Sirathu one of the 3 constituency of Kaushambi, serving population of this railway station is approximately 5.06 lakh.
- Bharwari railway station, Bharwari, it is the nearest railway station for Constituency Manjhanpur one of the 3 constituency of Kaushambi, serving population of this railway station is approximately 5.20 lakh
- Manauri railway station, Manauri bajar, It is situated in Prayagraj district but it is majorly served north-east part of Kaushambi district, it is the nearest railway station for constituency Chail one of the 3 constituency of Kaushambi, major serving population of this railway station is approximately 8.94 lakh including some areas of Prayagraj West Constituency and Chail constituency.

== Sports ==
Mohammed Aslam was an Indian Army Captain and heavyweight boxer from Bharwari who was a silver medalist at the Asian Amateur Boxing Championships in 1973 and 1975. Aslam won the Indian national championship in the heavyweight category for five consecutive years (1973–1978).

In recognition of his international success, President Giani Zail Singh awarded him the Vishisht Seva Medal (VSM) on May 21, 1986. Furthermore, President Shankar Dayal Sharma conferred upon him the rank of Honorary Captain on January 26, 1993, for his exemplary service in the Indian Army. Beyond his athletic honors, he was a decorated veteran of several Indian Army operations and the war against Pakistan.
