= Surendra Singh Yadav =

Indian police officer

6th DGP of Chandigarh Police
- In office 16 March 2024 – 1 April 2025
- Preceded by: Praveer Ranjan, IPS
- Succeeded by: Dr.Sagar Preet Hooda, IPS

DGP of Andaman and Nicobar Police
- In office 10 February 2024 – 15 March 2024
- Preceded by: D.C. Srivastava
- Succeeded by: Hargovinder Singh Dhaliwal

Personal details
- Born: 7 July 1975 (age 51) Alwar, Rajasthan
- Spouse: Alice Vaz
- Awards: Police Medal for Meritorious Service

Surendra Singh Yadav is an Indian Police Service (IPS) officer of 1997 batch. SS Yadav has served as the head and 6th DGP of Chandigarh Police from March 2024 to March 2025. Before this he was the DGP of Andaman and Nicobar Police

== Career and education ==
Surendra Singh Yadav was born on 7 July 1975 and hails from Alwar, Rajasthan. He is a 1997 batch Indian Police Service (IPS) officer of AGMUT cadre.

== See also ==
- Bhim Sain Bassi
- Kiran Bedi
