= Chandigarh Police =

Law enforcement agency in India

- Motto: We care for you

Agency overview
- Employees: 6000
- Annual budget: ₹508.06 crore (US$54.3 million) (2020-21)

Jurisdictional structure
- Operations jurisdiction: India
- Jurisdiction of Chandigarh Police forces (circled in red)
- Legal jurisdiction: Chandigarh
- General nature: Local civilian police

Operational structure
- Headquarters: Chandigarh Police Headquarters, Sector 9-D, Chandigarh
- Parent agency: Home Department, Chandigarh Administration

Facilities
- Stations: 11

Website
- chandigarhpolice.nic.in

The Chandigarh Police is the law enforcement agency for the Union Territory of Chandigarh in India. Chandigarh Police has its headquarters in sector 9 D, Chandigarh. The head of the state police is the Director General of Police of Chandigarh. The current DGP of Chandigarh is Dr.Sagar Preet Hooda, IPS of AGMUT Cadre. Chandigarh has the highest police density as compared to all other states and Union Territories across India. As of 2015, there are 5295.6 policemen per 100 km² area in Chandigarh.

List of former IGP/ DGP of Chandigarh
Sr. No	Name	Took office	Left office
1	B.N. Mehra, IPS	28 May 1979	31 March 1983
2	N.K. Singhal, IPS	9 May 1983	23 May 1985
3	R.K. Ohri, IPS	23 May 1985	16 January 1987
4	V.N, Singh, IPS	16 January 1987	6 March 1989
5	G.S. Sandhu, IPS	6 March 1989	30 July 1990
6	R.S. Gupta, IPS	30 July 1990	29 September 1993
7	Y.S. Dadwal, IPS	29 September 1993	26 December 1995
8	R.P. Singh, IPS	27 December 1995	5 April 1999
9	Dr Kiran Bedi, IPS	5 April 1999	18 May 1999
10	S.K. Singh, IPS	1 June 1999	30 June 2000
11	B.S. Bassi, IPS	1 July 2000	9 December 2002
12	Rajesh Kumar, IPS	9 December 2002	27 April 2005
13	Satish Chandra, IPS	27 April 2005	9 October 2006
14	S.K Jain, IPS	9 October 2006	14 September 2009
15	P.K Srivastava, IPS	5 December 2010	29 August 2012
16	R.P Upadhyaya, IPS	30 January 2013	8 March 2016
17	Tejendra Luthra, IPS	8 March 2016	26 June 2018
18	Sanjay Beniwal, IPS	27 June 2018	21 August 2021
19	Praveer Ranjan, IPS	21 August 2021	12 March 2024
20	Surendra Singh Yadav, IPS	16 March 2024	30 March 2025
(Acting)	Pushpendra Kumar, IPS	1 April 2025	14 July 2025
21	Dr.Sagar Preet Hooda, IPS	15 July 2025	Incumbent

== Organizational structure ==
Chandigarh Police comes under the administrative control of the Department of Home, Chandigarh administration. The department is headed by the Home Secretary of Chandigarh. The Head of Police Force is the Director General of Police. There are 5 major SP/SSP ranked posts in Chandigarh Police which are headed by various IPS officers. They report to the DIG, Chandigarh, who in turns report to the IG, Chandigarh. The Police force is staffed by IPS officers of the AGMUT cadre, however, the posts of SSP/UT and SSP/Traffic and Security are usually filled in by officers of Punjab and Haryana Cadre who are in deputation to the AGMUT Cadre.

Name	Current Posting
Dr.Sagar Preet Hooda, IPS	Director General of Police
Raj Kumar Singh, IPS	IG Chandigarh
Deepak Purohit, IPS	DIG Chandigarh
Manisha Chaudhary(Temporary Charge), IPS	SSP UT Chandigarh
Manisha Chaudhury, IPS	SSP Traffic and Security
Manoj Kumar Meena, IPS	SSP Crime, Intelligence and Headquarters & Vigilance
Ketan Bansal, IPS	SP Operation, Cyber, EOW and Women Cell
Shruti Arora, IPS	Commandant - IRB Chandigarh & SP City
