= Andaman and Nicobar Police =

Law enforcement agency in India

- Abbreviation: ANP
- Motto: Nirbhay-Nipun-Nirpaksh (निर्भय-निपुण-निर्पक्ष); Fearless-Skilled-Impartial

Agency overview
- Formed: August 1875; 148 years ago
- Preceding agency: The ‘Sebundy Corps’ (formed in 1858 under the British rule)
- Employees: 4130
- Annual budget: ₹731.50 crore (US$78.1 million) (2025–26)

Jurisdictional structure
- Operations jurisdiction: Andaman and Nicobar Islands, IN
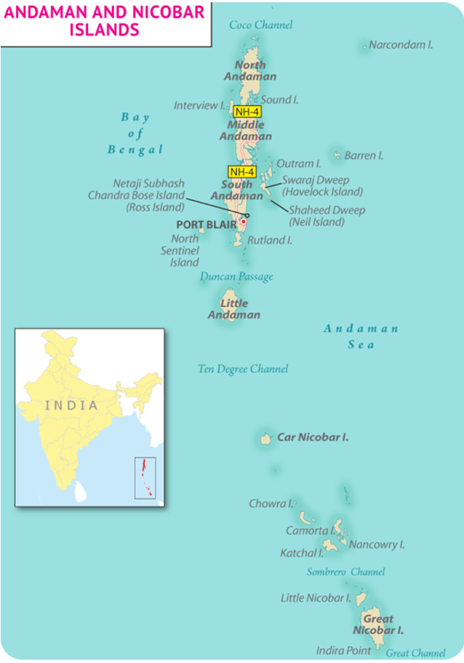
- 3 divisions of Andaman and Nicobar Police: North & Middle Andaman, South Andaman and Nicobar Group
- Area: 8, 249 Sq. Km.
- Population: Estimated 4,34,192 (2019)
- General nature: Local civilian police

Operational structure
- Headquarters: Police Headquarters, Port Blair
- Agency executive: Ravinder Yadav IPS, Director General of Police

Facilities
- Stations: 21 Police Stations

Website
- police.andamannicobar.gov.in

The Andaman and Nicobar Police (A&N Police) is the law enforcement agency for the Andaman and Nicobar Islands, India. A&N Police comes under the jurisdiction of the Ministry of Home Affairs, Government of India. The A&N Police has a sanctioned strength of 4130 posts of various ranks in Civil Police, Criminal Investigation Department, Immigration and Foreigners Branch, Motor Vehicle Section, Traffic branch, Security Unit, Forensic Science Laboratory, Finger Print Unit, Dog Squad, Special Armed Police, Armed Police, Island Communication, Fire Service Units and India Reserve Battalion.

== History of Andaman & Nicobar Police ==
=== Origins ===
The origins of the Andaman and Nicobar Police can be traced back to the 19th century during the British colonial rule. The need for a suitable penitentiary far away from the mainland led to the establishment of a police force primarily tasked with managing the so-called mutineers, deserters, and rebels in A&N Islands. In its nascent stage, the force closely followed a military pattern, reflecting the unique challenges of the remote islands.

=== The Sebundy Corps ===
The Sebundy Corps, raised in 1858 for the protection of the settlement, marked the initial attempt at policing. However, it was deemed unsuccessful and disbanded in 1861, paving the way for a more structured approach to law enforcement. This transition laid the foundation for the modern police force in the Andaman and Nicobar Islands.

=== The Convict Police ===
Initially, the system of policing was followed almost exclusively on a military pattern. At the same time, there existed another body of men called the Convict Police. This force was distributed at various points in the convict settlement. They patrolled certain beats, armed with batons, and ensured the observance of local laws. They also accompanied prisoners to the jungles as guards against the aboriginal tribes.

In 1869, the British Government took formal possession of the Nicobar (by a notification issued in the “British Burma Gazette”). Subsequently, the strength of the police establishment was also increased. The newly recruited men were principally drawn from Punjab. The main weapon carried by the force at that time was a smoothbore carbine and bayonet.

=== The Police Act & Military Police ===
The Government Notification issued vide No.- 377 dated 24 August 1875, extended the Police Act (Act of 1861) to the A&N Islands. The Chief Commissioner was made the Inspector General of Police, and Captain Wimberley of the Andaman Commission was probably the first official to hold the charge of District Superintendent of Police.

In 1888, a special regulation was issued regarding the existing force, thus turning it into a Military Force of A&N Islands. From 1906 to 1908, the Military Police underwent a complete reorganization, and its strength was fixed as follows: -

Sl. No.	Rank	Strength
1.	Commandant	Head
2.	Asst. Commandants	2
3.	Headquarter Insp.	2
4.	Subedar Major	1
5.	Subedars	5
6.	Jemadars	7
7.	NCOs and men	787

=== Birth of the Civil Police ===
In 1924, the Civil Police was separated from the Military Police and constituted into a new branch of the force under the control of the Commandant, who was also entrusted as the District Superintendent of Police. The force was inspected by a Deputy Inspector General of Police of the Burma Military Police in 1929. Based on the recommendations contained in the above inspection reports, since 1934, the Superintendent of Police and Commandant were officers of the Indian Police.

Mr. HGL Biggie was the first officer of the Indian Police to be appointed as the Commandant and the District Superintendent of Police. He was succeeded by Mr. Macarthy I.P in 1937. During the Second World War, Mr. Macarthy is reported to have left these Islands a few days before the Japanese occupation in 1942. The British re-occupied these Islands on 8 October 1945, and a fresh batch of officers and men, called the "Deputation Force,” mostly from Uttar Pradesh and Madras Police, was brought under the command of Mr. Littlewort, IP. However, this force was returned to their parent cadre after some time, and fresh recruitment was made later on. Unlike other state Police forces in India, this force comprised officers and men engaged from different states and territories of the country.

=== Post-Independence Trajectory ===
The evolution of the Andaman & Nicobar Police is noteworthy. Prior to 1974, the governance structure operated under a General Police District system, guided by the Police Act of 1861. The entire territory was considered a single district, headed by the Inspector General of Police. At that time, a District Superintendent of Police oversaw Criminal Administration and Law Enforcement, while Deputy Superintendents of Police managed Sub-divisions within the district.

In 1974, a pivotal shift occurred with the establishment of two Police Districts: the Andaman District headquartered at Port Blair, and the Nicobar District headquartered at Car Nicobar. Additionally, four Sub-Divisions were introduced—South Andaman and Mayabunder under the Andaman District, and Car Nicobar and Nancowrie under the Nicobar District. During this period, 10 Police stations and 12 Outposts operated as key operational units, handling law enforcement and investigative responsibilities across the region.

Subsequently, the Andaman & Nicobar Islands experienced a considerable population increase, leading to a rise in crime rates and posing challenges to law and order. This surge placed substantial pressure on police resources, especially in terms of manpower. The archipelago's unique physical isolation and remote nature exposed the A&N Islands to diverse threats, including poaching of marine and forest resources, illegal migration, and arms and drugs smuggling. This underscored the critical importance of ensuring internal security within this island chain.

In 2009, a new District named North & Middle Andaman was declared operational. With this addition, the policing structure expanded to three District Headquarters and four Sub-Divisions, functioning with a total of 21 Police Stations.

== Mission statement ==
The Mission of Andaman and Nicobar Police is to provide quality service in line with the objectives of the Police Force, spelt out in the Police Act and the Andaman and Nicobar Police Manual.

The Priority areas are

- Enhancing investigating and crime solving abilities by use of modern methods in day-to-day police work.
- Pro-active community policing for developing a problem solving approach.
- Strengthening the operational capabilities of the police force through technology intervention.
- Increased use of Information Technology in police work for effective public interface and transparency in police work.

== Organization ==
As of today, the police organisation in the Andaman and Nicobar Islands is as follows:

1. Three Police Districts: South Andaman, North and Middle Andaman and Nicobar Districts.

2. Seven sub-divisions: Port Blair, Bambooflat, Rangat, Diglipur, Havelock, Car Nicobar, and Campbell Bay.

3. Twenty one territorial law and order Police Stations, along with three Special Police Stations, namely Anti-Human Trafficking Police Station, Central Crime Station, and Police Station Anti-Corruption.

4. Additionally, there are 24 Out Posts, 12 Jarawa Protection Posts, and 07 Look Out Posts. The complete list of Police Stations and its jurisdiction over Out Posts, Jarawa Protection Posts & Look out Posts of A&N Police.

A comprehensive understanding of the same may be developed by referring to the tables below:

=== South Andaman ===
S.No.	Police Stations	Out Posts	Jarawa Protection Posts
1.	Aberdeen		
2.	Chatham		
3.	Pahargaon	Burma Nallah	
4.	Humfry Gunj	Wandoor Rut Land	
5.	Shaheed Dweep		
6.	Swaraj Dweep	Shaheed Dweep Radha Nagar	
7.	Hutbay	Ram Krishna Pur	
8.	Ograbraj	Ferrar Gunj Tirur	Tirur –IA Tirur No. 4 Sona Pahar Hazari Bagh
9.	Bambooflat	Wimberly Gunj Mile Tilak	Jirkatang No. 2

=== North and Middle Andaman ===
S.No.	Police Stations	Out Posts	JPPs	Look Out Posts
1.	Baratang	-	Middle Strait	-
2.	Kadamtala	-	Bamboo Tekry Yeterjig No. 11 Parlobjig No. 03 Parlobjig No. 09 Parlobjig No. 15	-
3.	Rangat	Long Island Charlungta	Kushalya Nagar	-
4.	Billiground	Beta Pur Badam Nallah	-	-
5.	Mayabunder	Rest Camp Chainpur	Hanspuri	Luis Inlet Bay Interview Island
6.	Kalighat	Kishori Nagar	-	-
7.	Diglipur	Radha Nagar Sagar Dweep	-	East Island Norcondum Karen Nallah (Police Post)

=== Nicobar District ===
S.No.	Police Stations	Out Posts	Look Out Posts
1.	Car Nicobar	Sawai	
2.	Nancowrie		Tillangchong
3.	Katchal		
4.	Teressa	Chowra	
5.	Campbell Bay	Gandhi Nagar Macachua Afra Bay	

=== Units ===
The Police is also subdivided into various units whose functioning and collaboration is essential to maintain law and order, prevent crime, conduct coastal patrolling and surveillance, and maintain a watchful vigil in the Union Territory of the Andaman and Nicobar Islands.

=== Hierarchy ===
The rank and hierarchical structure of the Andaman and Nicobar Police shall be the following: -

1. Director General of Police.

2. Addl. Director General of Police/Inspector General of Police.

3. Deputy Inspector General of Police.

4. Superintendent of Police.

5. Deputy Superintendent of Police.

6. Inspector of Police.

7. Sub-Inspector of Police.

8. Assistant Sub-Inspector of Police.

9. Head Constable.

10. Police Constable.

11. Follower Constable.

=== Rank and Insignia ===
Rank of Gazetted Officers
DGP	IGP	DIGP	SSP	SP	ASP/DC	Dy.SP/AC
rank wear of DGP	Rank insignia of IGP A & N Police	Rank Insignia for DIGP Rank officer of Indian police	Rank Insignia for SSP Rank officer in Indian police	Rank Insignia for SP Rank Officer in Indian police	Rank Insignia for ACP-DC rank officer of Indian police	Dysp-AC Rank officers insignia Indian police
Rank of Non-Gazetted Officers
Inspector	SI	ASI	HC	Ct		Ct(T)
Inspector Rank Insignia Indian police	SUB Inspector Rank Officer insignia Indian Police	Assistant Sub inspector Rank Officer of Indian police	Head Constable Rank Officer Insignia Indian Police	No Insignia		

=== Present Day Leadership ===
At present the Police Administration is headed by the Director General of Police, assisted by 03 Deputy Inspector General of Police, 01 Sr. Superintendent of Police, 06 Superintendents of Police, 01 Assistant Superintendent of Police and 21 Deputy Superintendents of Police.

== Protecting indigenous communities ==
The original inhabitants of Andaman & Nicobar Islands were six aboriginal tribes, namely Andamanese, Jarawa's, Onges, Sentinelese, Nicobarese and Shompen's. The first four are from Negrito stock, confined to Andaman Islands. Nicobarese and Shompen's trace their descent from Mongoloid ancestry, inhabiting southern group of Nicobar Islands. Police plays an integral role in securing their protection.

=== Implementation of Laws ===
The Andaman and Nicobar Islands (Protection of Aboriginal Tribes) Amendment Regulation, 2012 aims to provide protection for the interests of socially and economically backward aboriginal tribes of A & N Islands. It includes stringent punishment, including imprisonment, for exploitation of tribal communities in the Andaman & Nicobar Islands.

- Under Section 8 of the principal Regulation, stringent penal provisions have been included for violations:
- 3 years imprisonment and a fine in the event of taking photographs/videos of aboriginal tribes; encroaching, hunting, and poaching in reserve areas; promoting tourism through advertisement on aboriginal tribes; setting up commercial/tourist establishments in the Buffer Zone.
- 7 years imprisonment and a fine in the event of introducing any form of Alcohol/intoxication & any inflammable or explosive substances to aboriginal tribes.
- The Protection of Aboriginal Tribes Act is vehemently implemented, and strict and prompt action is taken whenever anyone violates its provisions and makes illegal intrusions into their protected areas.

=== Jarawa Protection Posts ===
Jarawa tribes have lived within a few hundred square kilometres of tribal reserve in the middle of the largest Andaman Island, maintaining their independence and keeping civilization at bay. Today, the Jarawa's and other tribes have witnessed civilization extending its influence, while the Sentinelese remain the only isolated tribe in the islands, and perhaps in all of India.

Initially, the “Bush Police” was created by the British as a unique police institution to provide a protective umbrella of security coverage, primarily for the Jarawa tribe living in the wilderness of the Andamans. The Bush Police camps were strategically located and consisted of thatched hutments.

The Bush Policemen were deployed on the outer peripheral fringes of Jarawa dwellings, keeping these tribesmen within their native areas and prohibiting other civilized individuals from entering these protected locales.

In the 1990s, this system was dismantled, and a new system of Jarawa Protection Posts was introduced. The approach was not to see tribal's as aggressors but rather as those who were vulnerable. The focus was on ensuring their protection rather than protection from them.

During any type of confrontation of Jarawa's with the local people, the situation is being handled by the JPP Staff in coordination with the staff of the Tribal welfare department and a tribe member who acts as a mediator to negotiate the situation.

=== Functions of Jarawa Protection Police ===
- To safeguard the Jarawa community from the detrimental impacts due to interaction with the outside world, particularly when they are not adequately prepared in terms of physical, social, and cultural readiness for such engagement.
- To preserve the social organization, mode of subsistence and cultural identity of the Jarawa community.
- To provide safety and security to other stakeholders who work for the development of tribes.
- To conserve the ecology and environment of the Jarawa Reserve Territory and strengthen support systems in order to enable the Jarawa pursue their traditional modes of subsistence end way of life.
- To sensitize settler communities around the Jarawa habitat and personnel working for the protection and preservation of the Jarawa about the need to preserve this ancient community and to value their unique culture and lifestyles.

=== Convoy system on ATR in Jarawa reserve area ===
The police department provides escorts at the front, back, and middle of each convoy from Jirkatang to Middle Strait. The primary objective of this convoy system is to safeguard the interests of the aboriginal Jarawa tribes residing in South and Middle Andaman. Tourists traveling on the Andaman Trunk Road are strictly monitored to ensure there is no interaction between the Jarawa people and tourists. Vehicles on the Andaman Trunk Road are permitted to move only during restricted hours and in convoys, adhering to notified speed limits. This is to prevent potential road accidents and to minimize any chance of interaction between travellers and the Jarawa community.

== Crime ==
The crime rate (crime incidence per 100,000 of population) in Andaman and Nicobar is declining, as per the National Crime Records Bureau. Despite numerous challenges, the crime rate in the Andaman Islands consistently remains low. This indicates the effectiveness of local police efforts and community engagement. Proactive preventive measures and innovative police practices, combined with heightened security, have proven highly effective in reducing crime in the Andaman & Nicobar Islands. The utilization of advanced technology for detection and investigation has significantly minimized opportunities for criminals to evade capture. The implementation of robust security policies and targeted awareness campaigns aimed at dissuading criminal activities has been instrumental in maintaining peace in the region.

Crime Rate	2021	2022
Violent Crimes	21.9	10.9
Murder	4.0	1.75
Rape	7.9	3.25
Kidnapping	1.7	4.0
Robbery	0.5	1.0
Hit & Run	0.5	0.5
Illegal Arms	0.0	0.0

However, various threats plague the islands such as drug abuse, bootlegging, drownings, illegal timber trafficking, poaching and porous borders, which create security risks.

== Policing Interventions ==
Infrastructure

=== Vehicles in A&N Police ===
LMV	HMV	Two Wheeler	Total
138	63	344	545

=== Ships and Boats ===
The Police Marine Force conducts coastal patrolling by Medium Class vessels, Fast Interceptor Boats, FRP Boats, Dinghies and Rubberized Boats in different parts of the A&N Islands.

Types of vessels
Medium Class vessel MV White Water
Fast Interceptor Boats
FRP(Fibre Reinforced Plastic) Boat with twin OBM
RHIB( Rigid Haul inflatable boat)
FRP(Fibre Reinforced Plastic) Dinghy single OBM
Gemini( inflatable rubber boat) 10 Person capacity

== Medals & Honours of the Andaman and Nicobar Police ==
SL No.	Name of Award	No of personnel
1	Kirti Chakra	01
2	President's Police Medal/PM for Meritorious & Distinguished service	92
3	President's Fire Service Medal for Meritorious & Distinguished service	24
4	Police Medal for gallantry	02
5	Home Guard Meritorious Service Medal	06
6	Ati-Utkrisht Seva Padak	34
7	Utkrisht SevaPadak	71
8	LG's Commendations Certificate	95
9	Union Home Ministers Medal for Excellence in Training in Indoor and Outdoor	10
10	Jeevan Raksha Padak	04
11	Union Home Ministers Medal for Excellence in Police Investigation	04
12	Asadharan Aasuchana Kushalta Padak	01

== Gallery ==
Photo Gallery
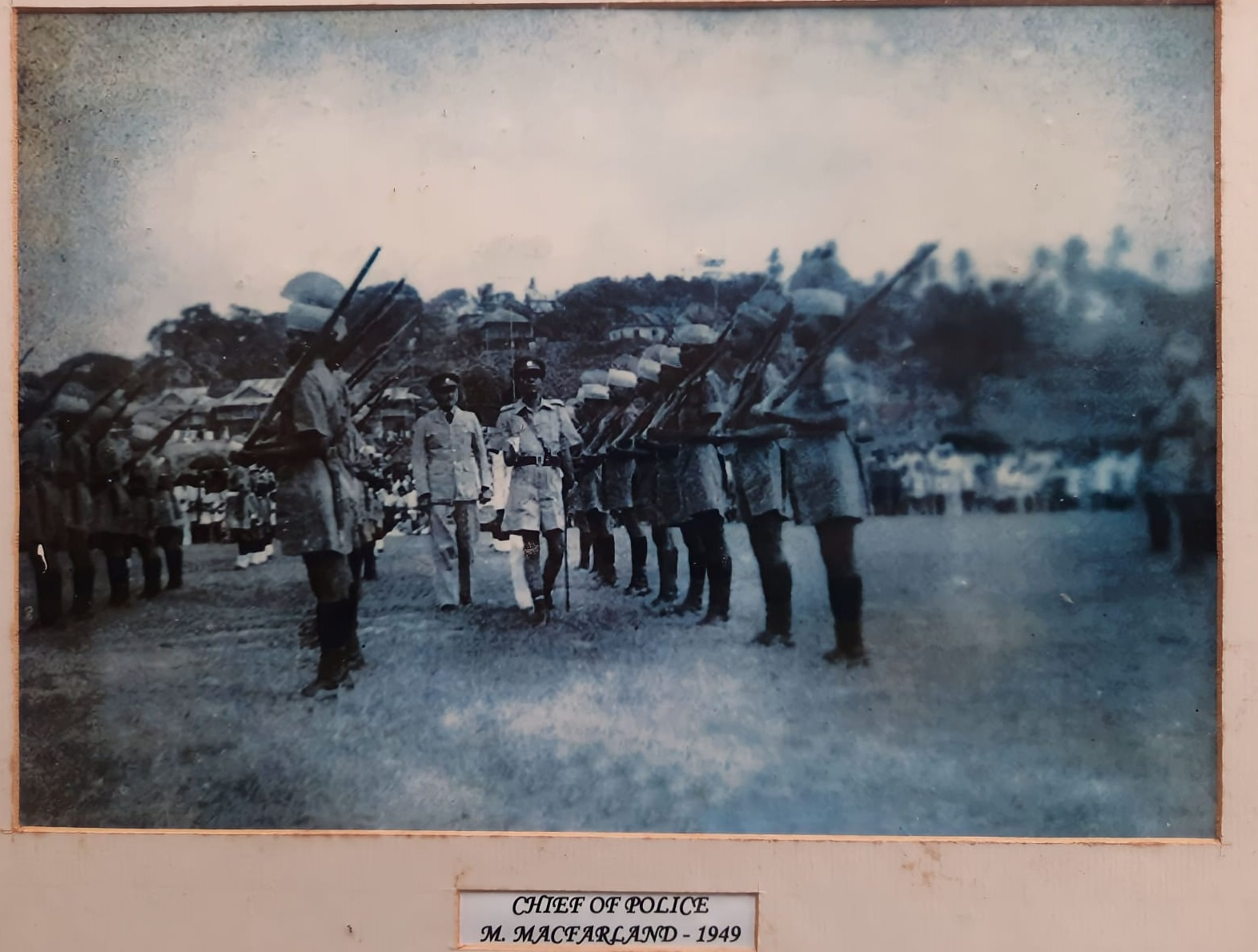
1949-Chief of A & N Police M Macferland

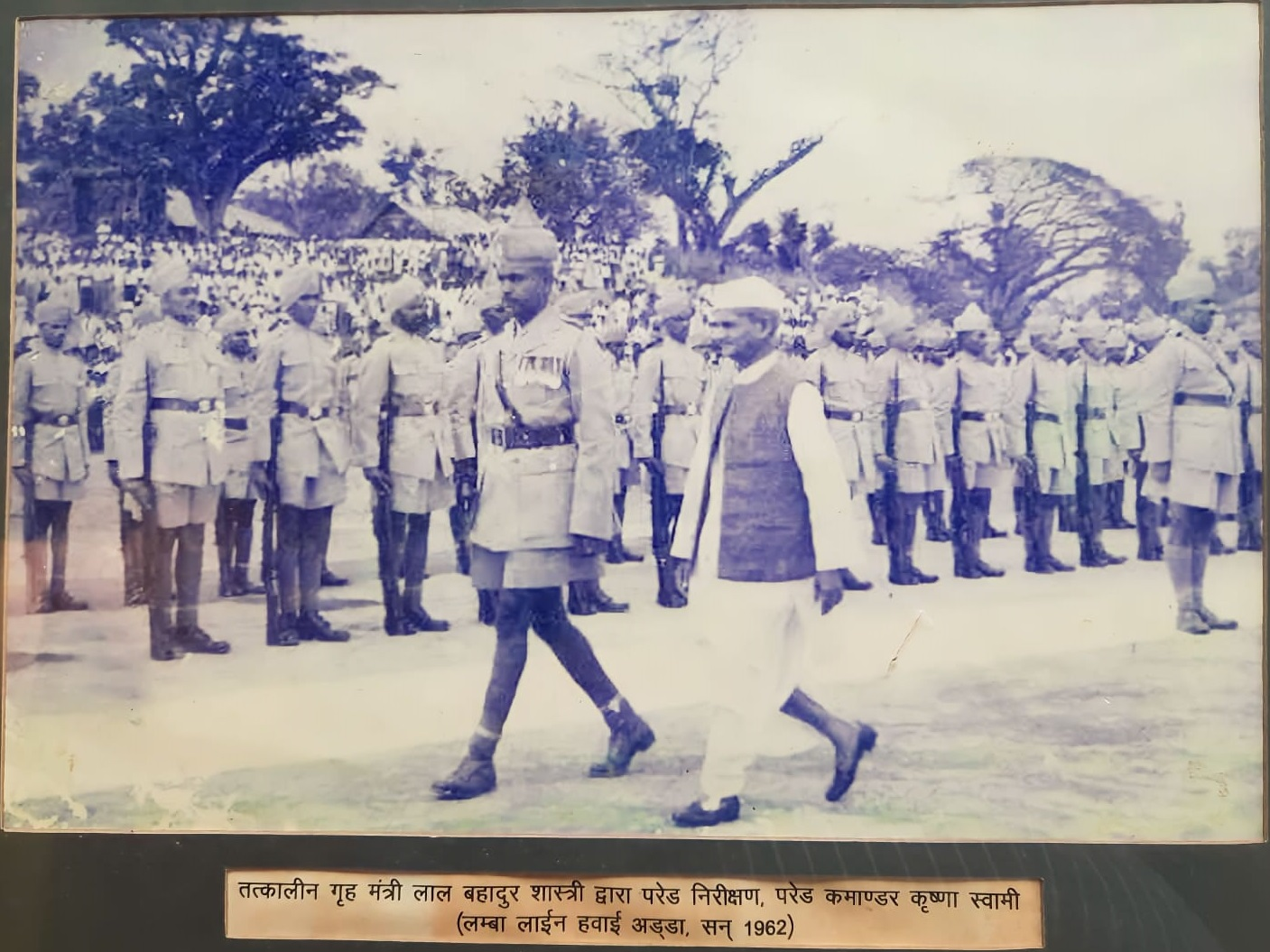
1962-A & N Police Presenting guard of Honor to HM Sh. Lal Bahadur Shastri,

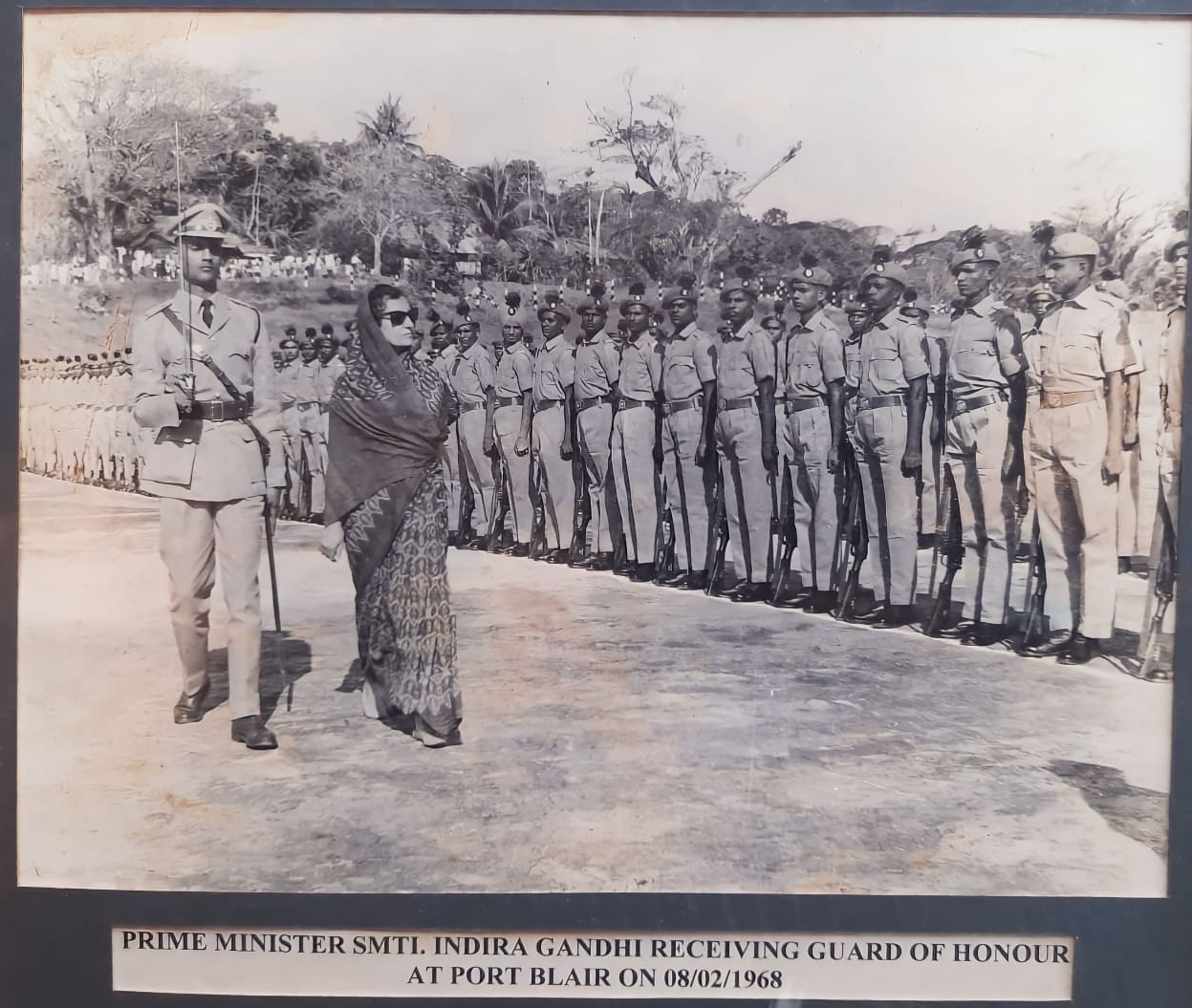
1968- A & N Police Presenting guard of Honor to PM Sh. Indira Gandhi

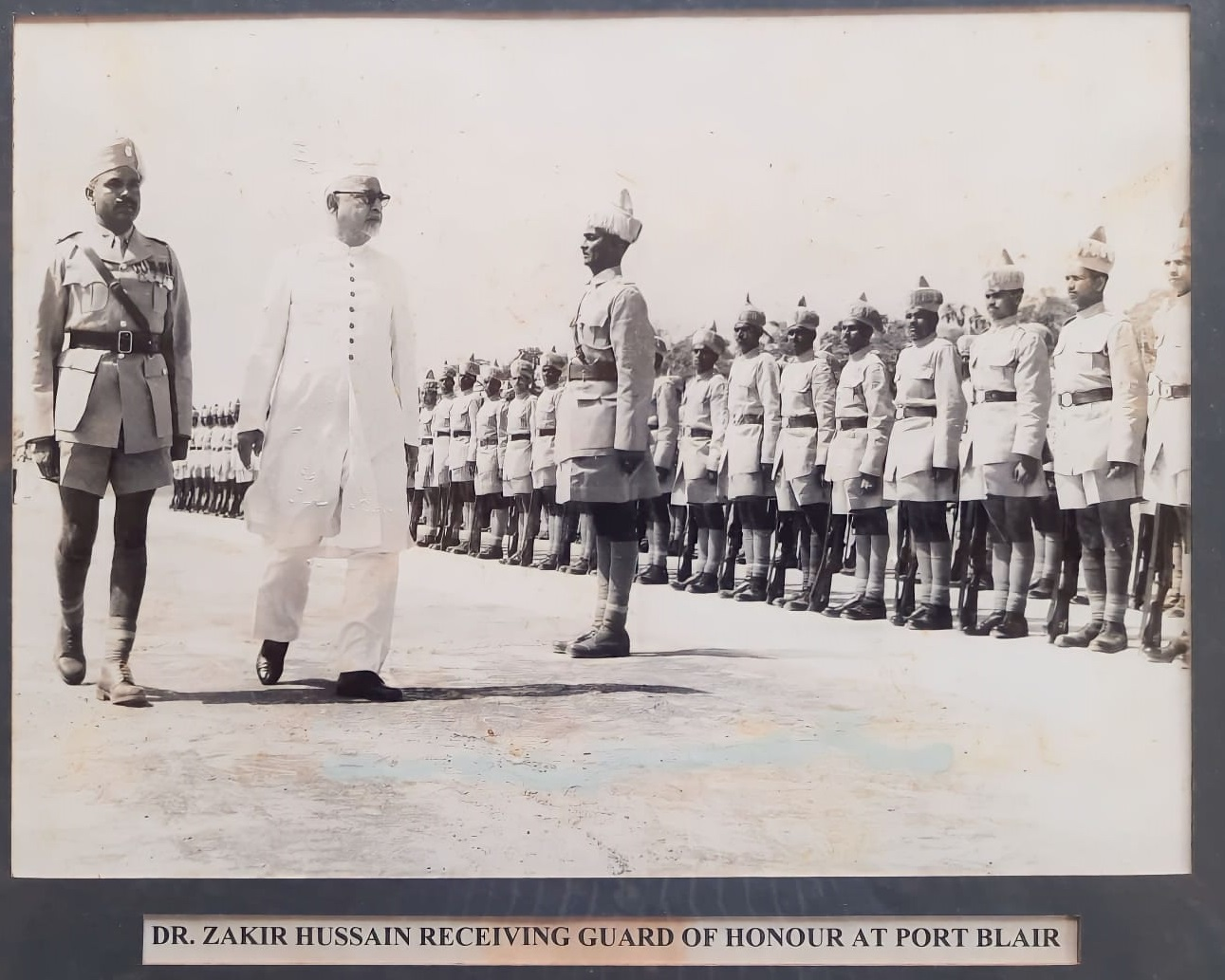
1966-A & N Police Presenting guard of Honor to VP Sh. DR Zakir Hussain

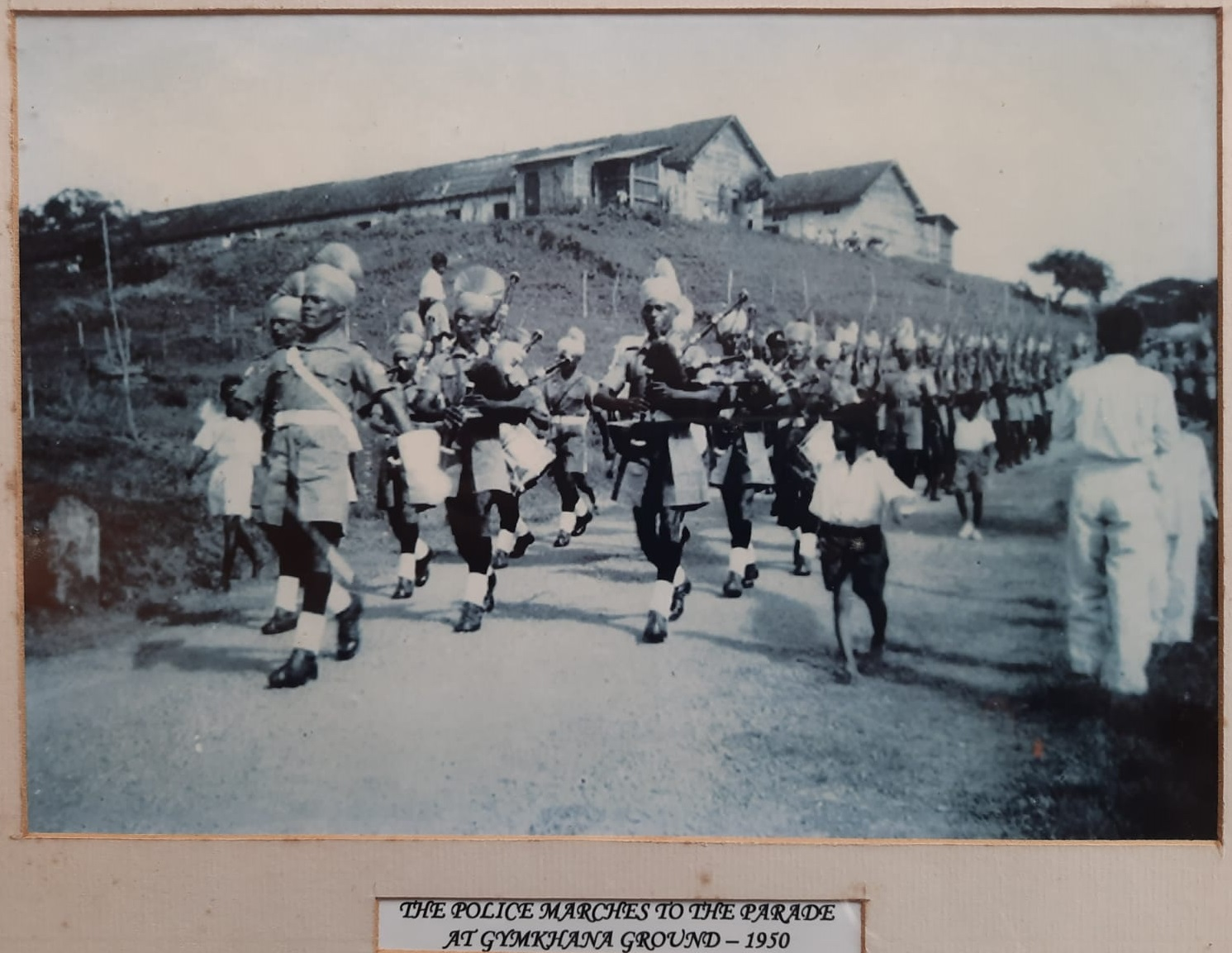
1950- A & N Police Contingent marching on occasion of Republic Day

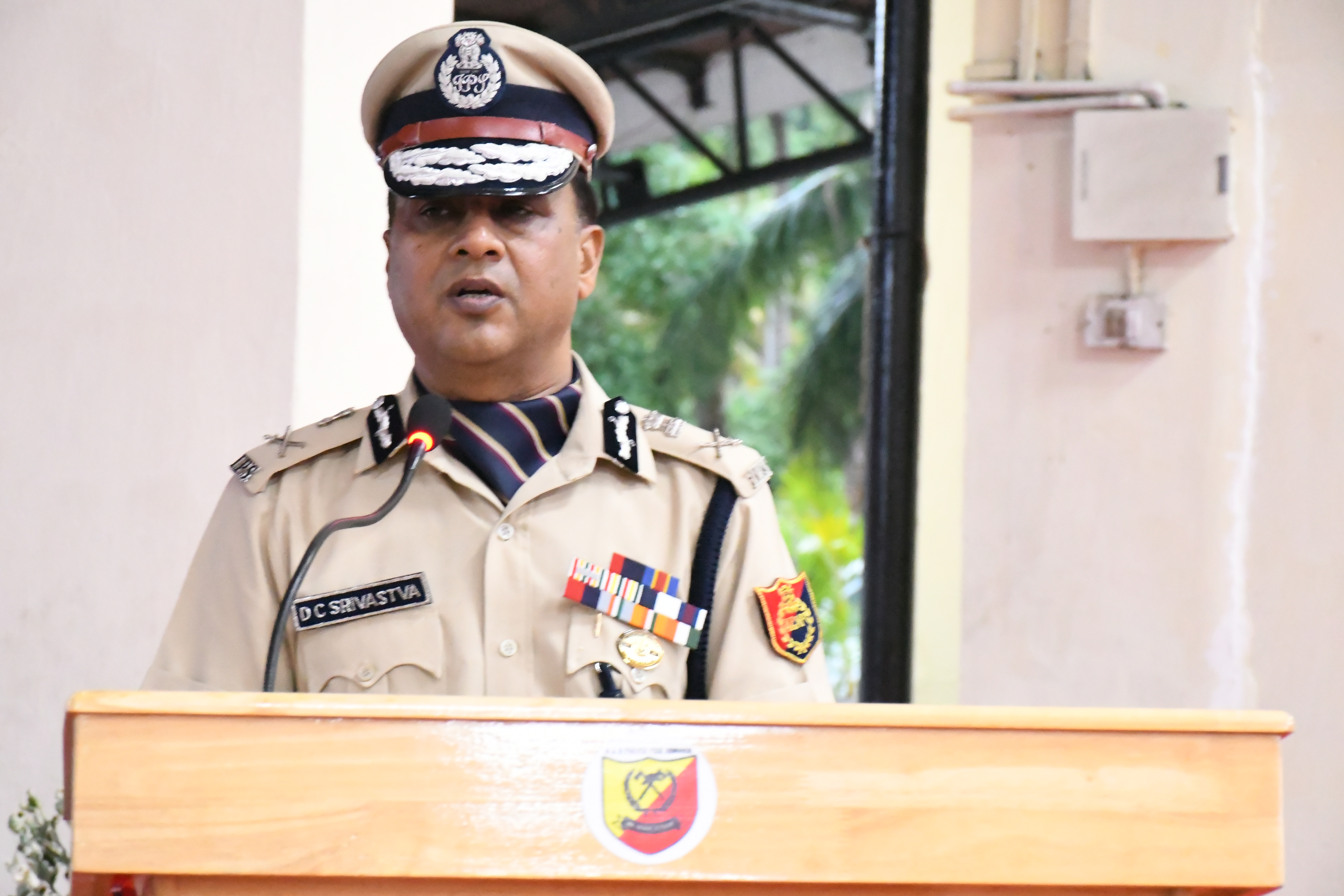
Sh. Devesh Chandra Srivastva, IPS, DGP, A & N Police

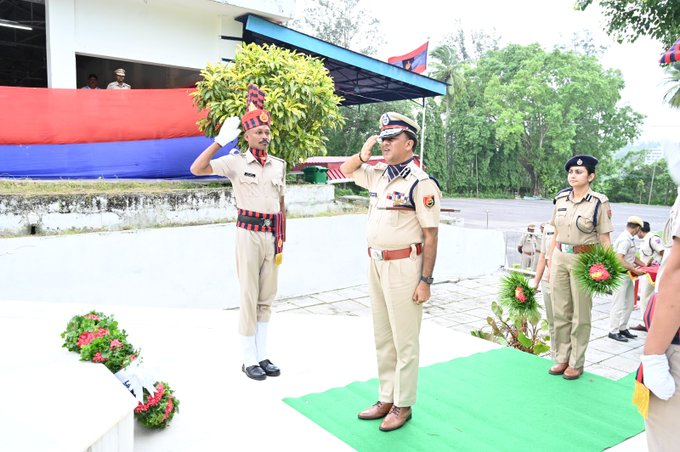
DGP, ANI Paying Homage on Police Commemoration Day

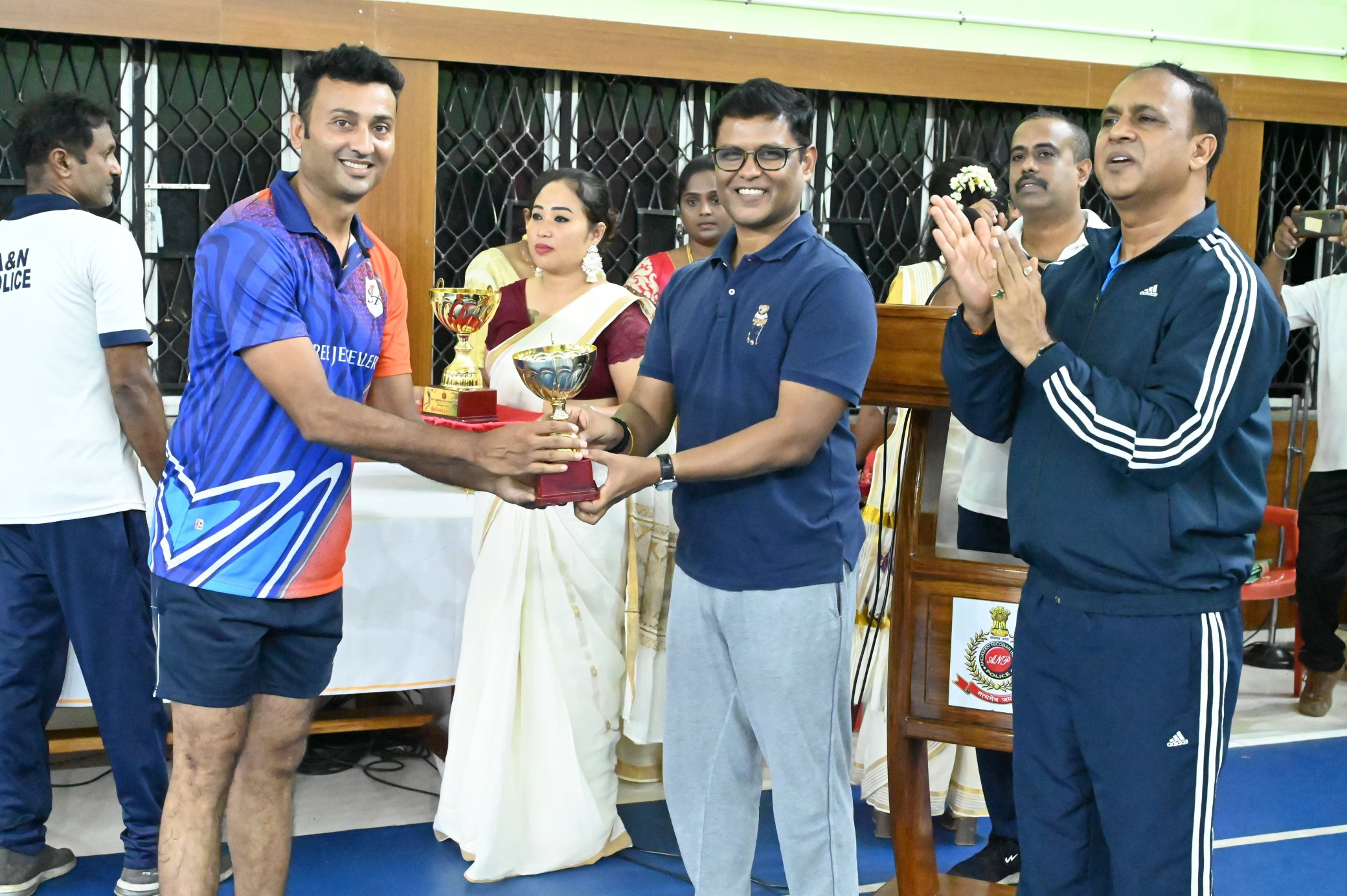
CS, ANI Honoring Winners of DGP badminton Cup.

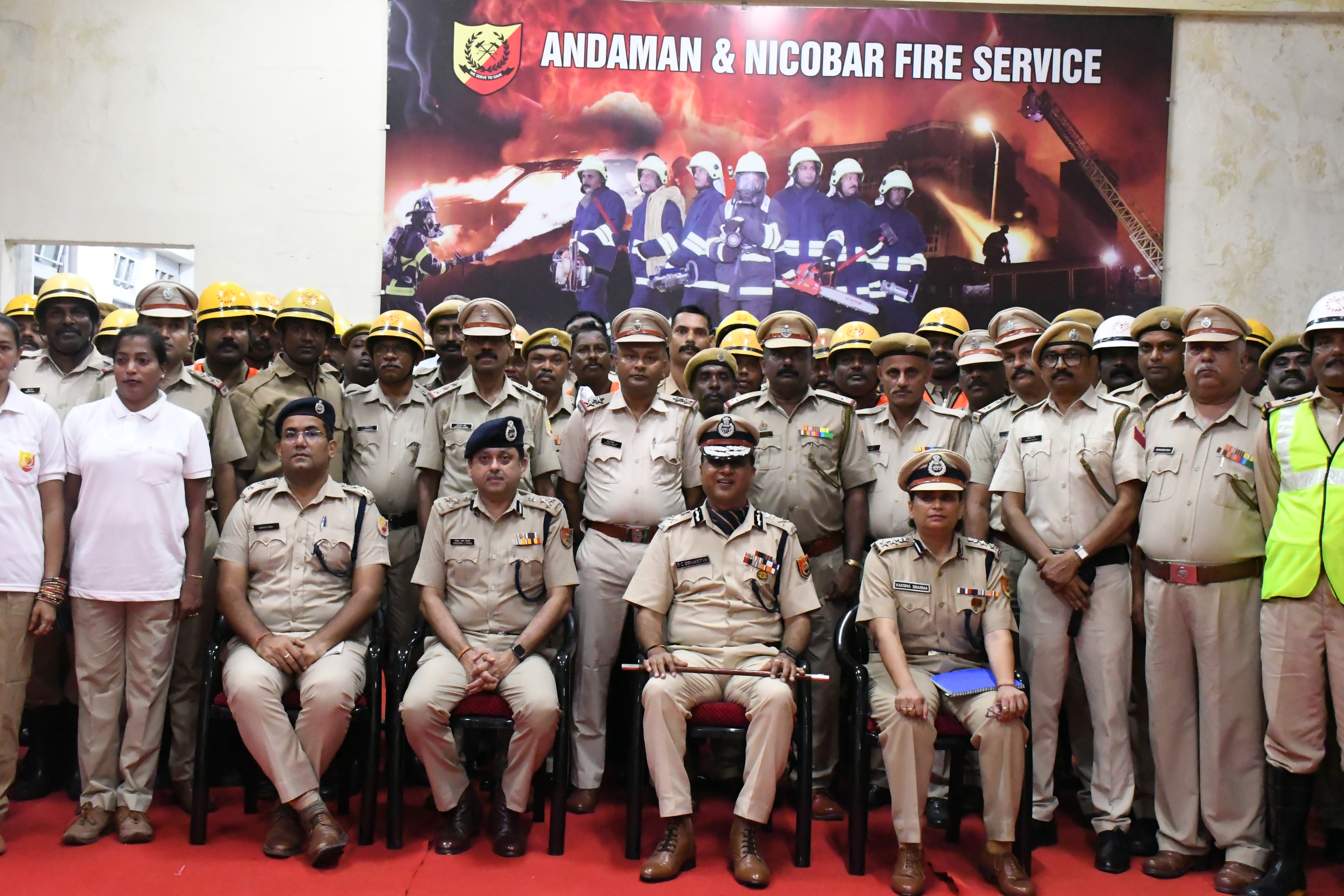
A group photograph of A & N Fire Service.

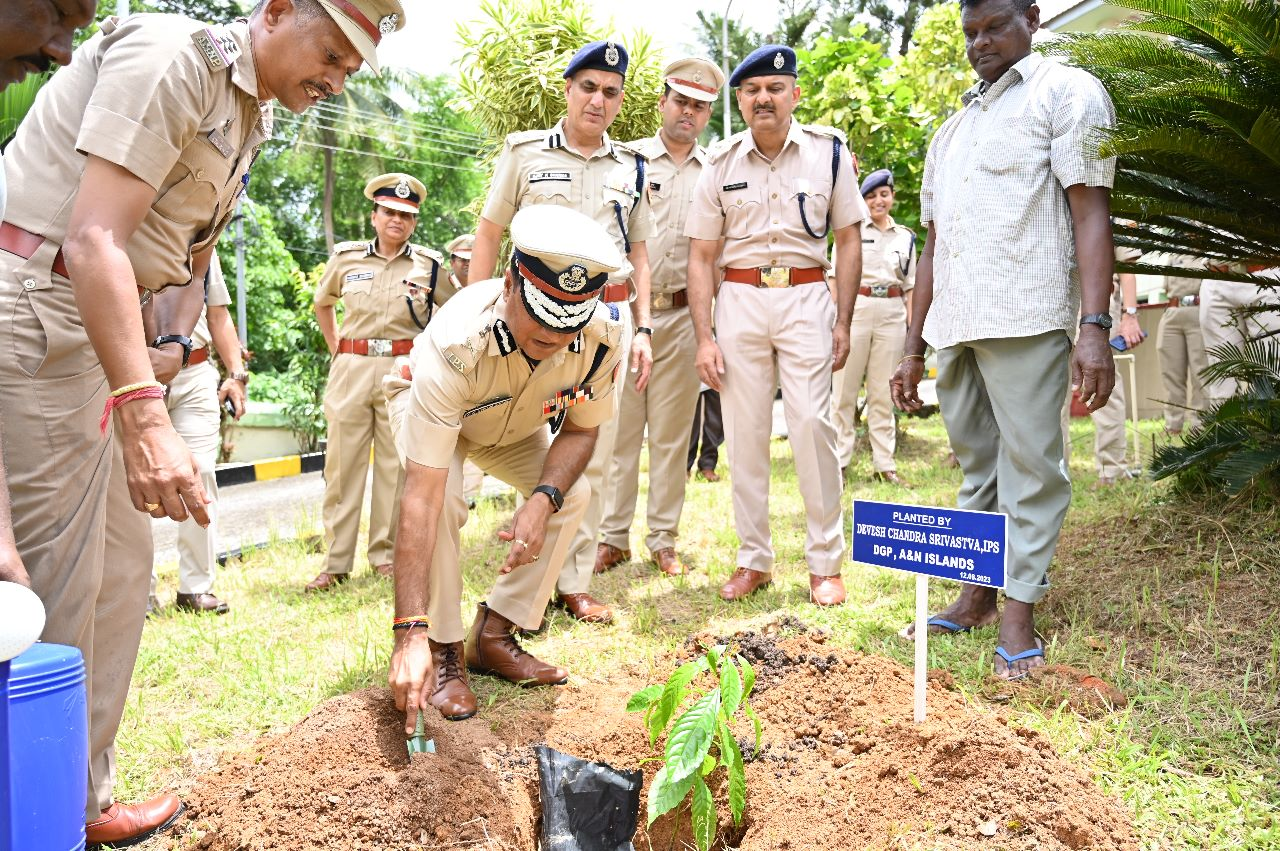
DGP, ANI attending Plantation drive.

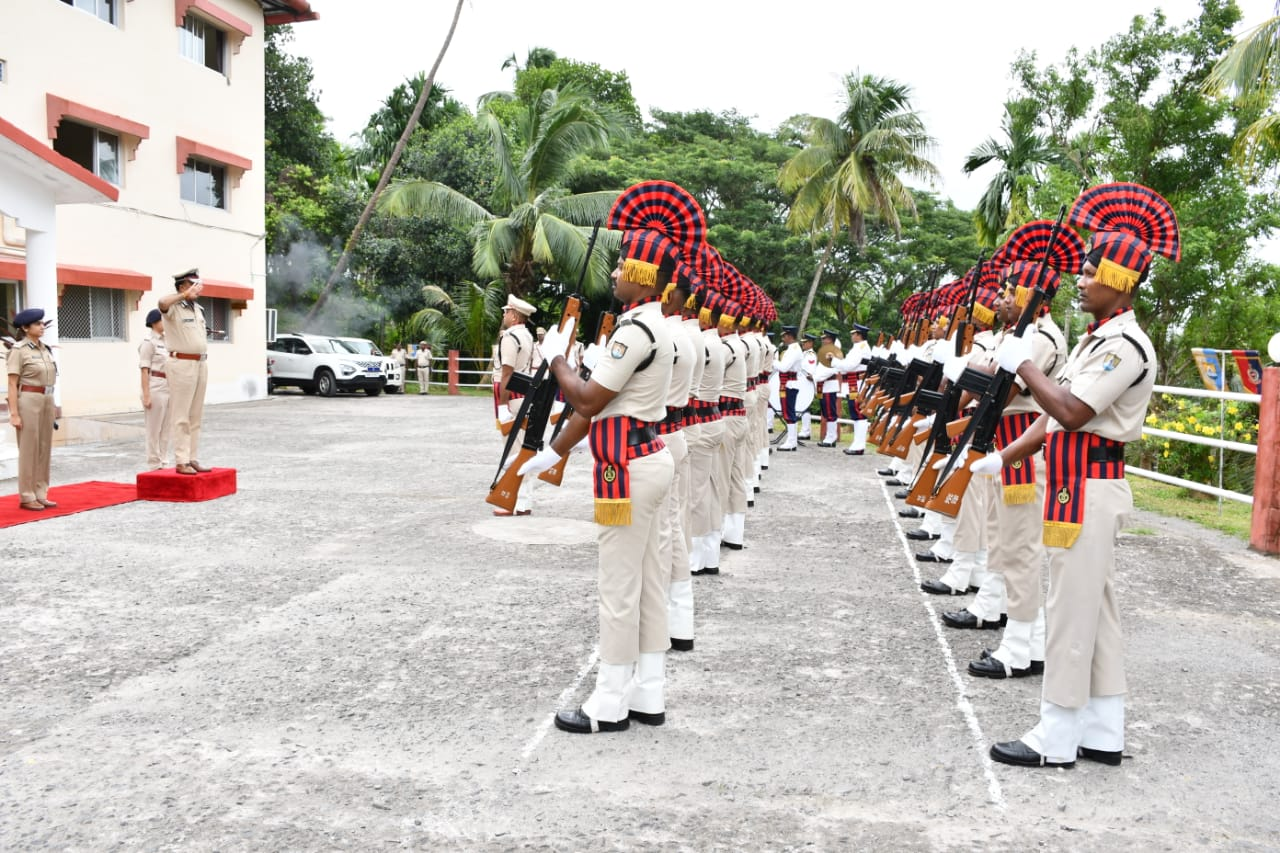
DGP, ANI visited IRBn HQ.

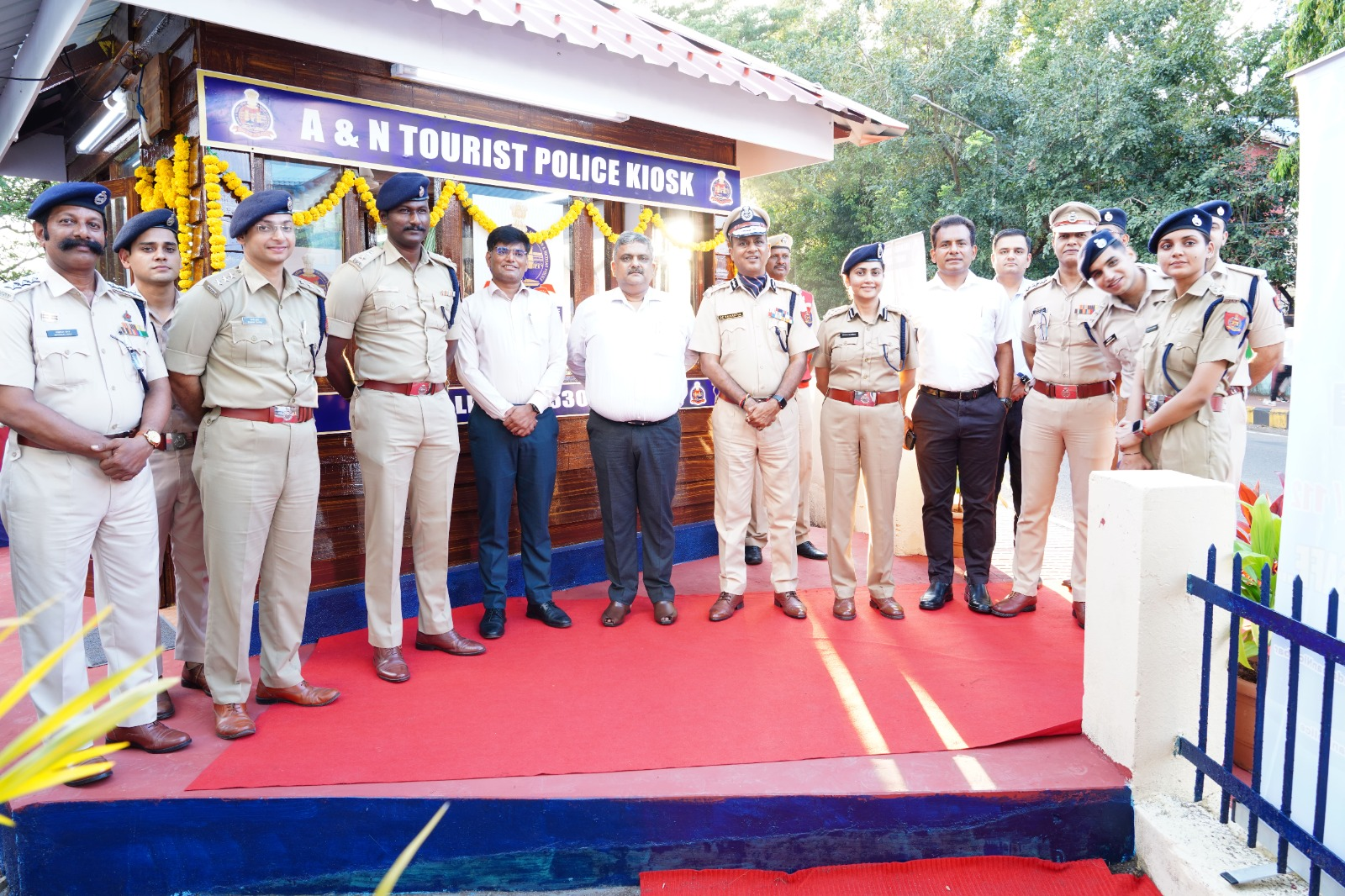
DGP, ANI at inauguration of tourist Police kiosk.

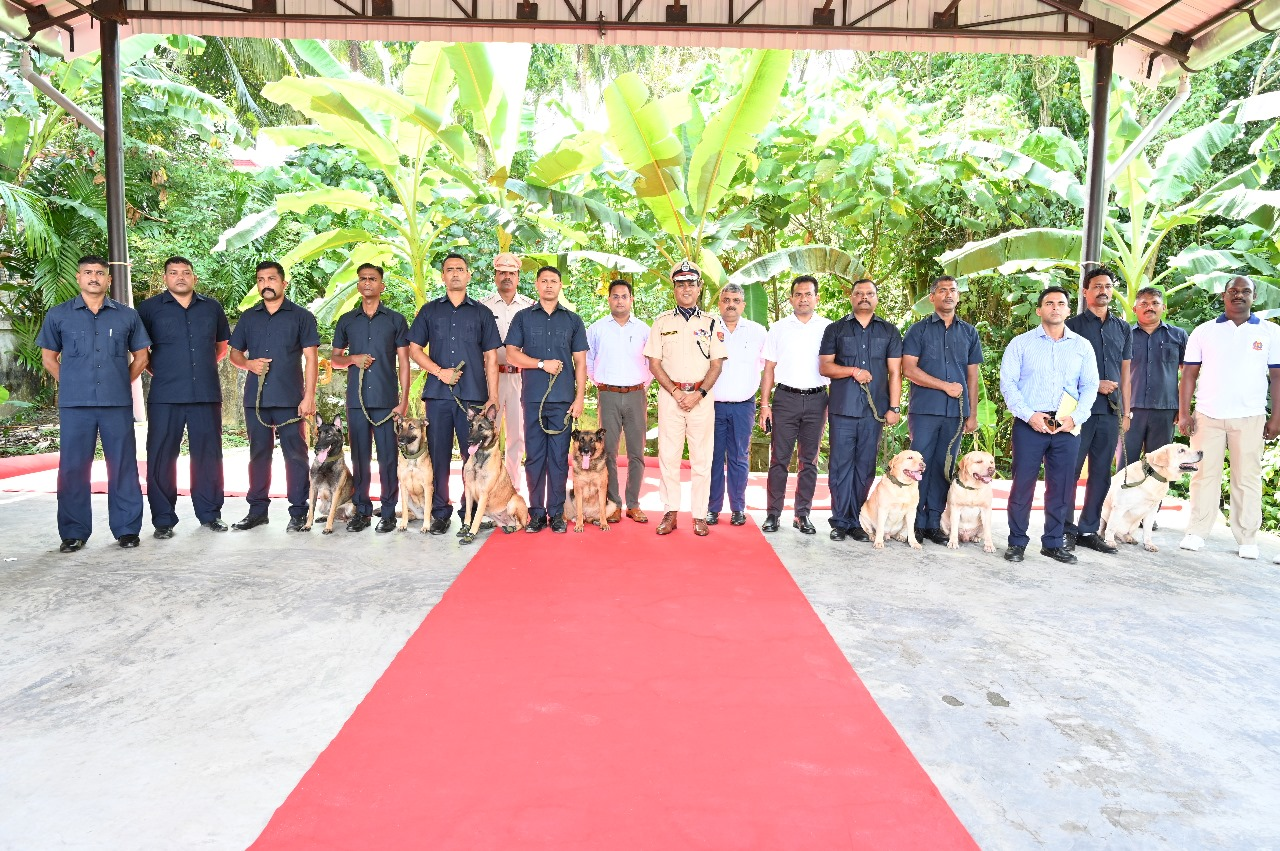
Glimpse of Police Dog Squad.

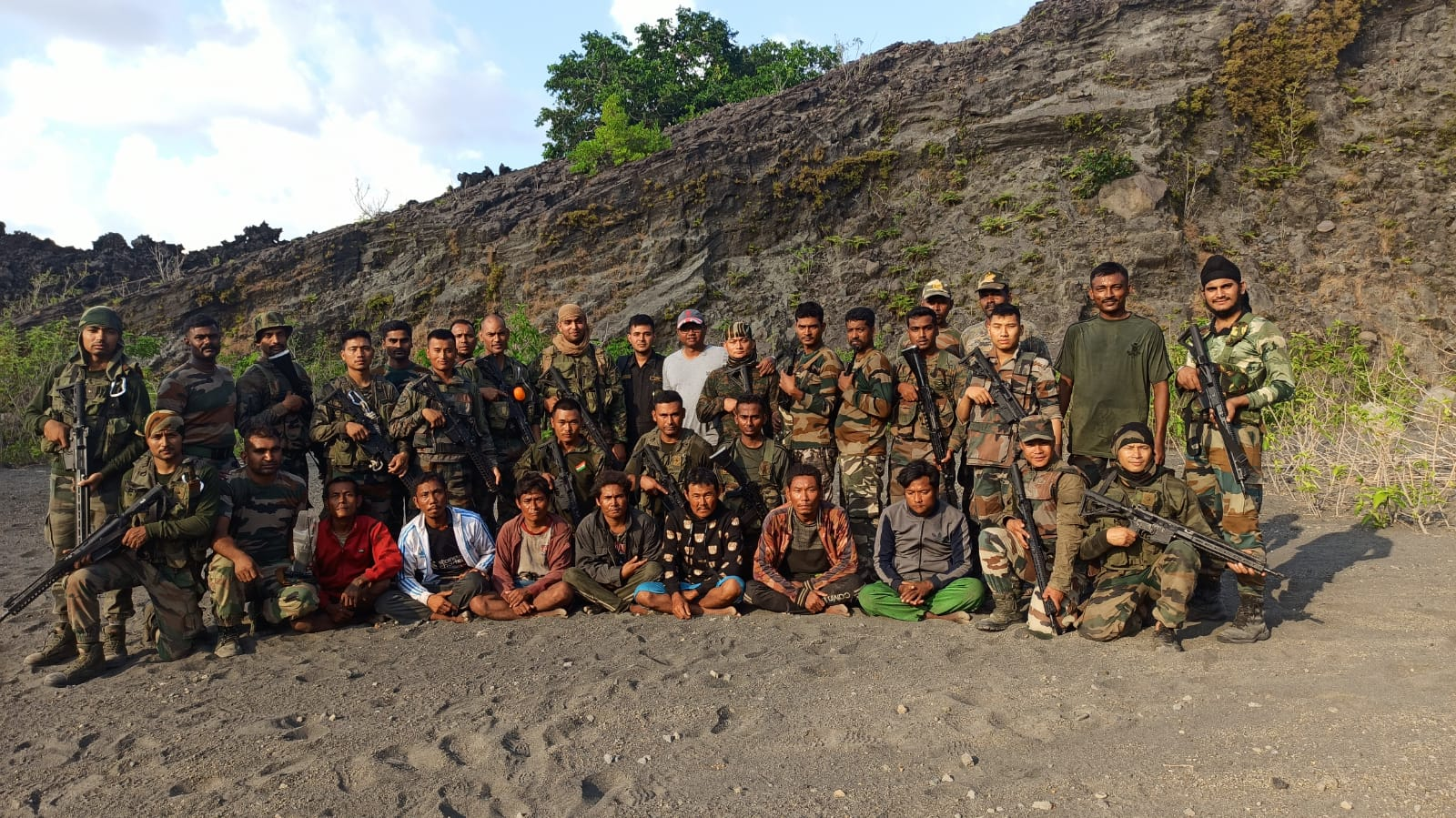
Special Ops by ANP.

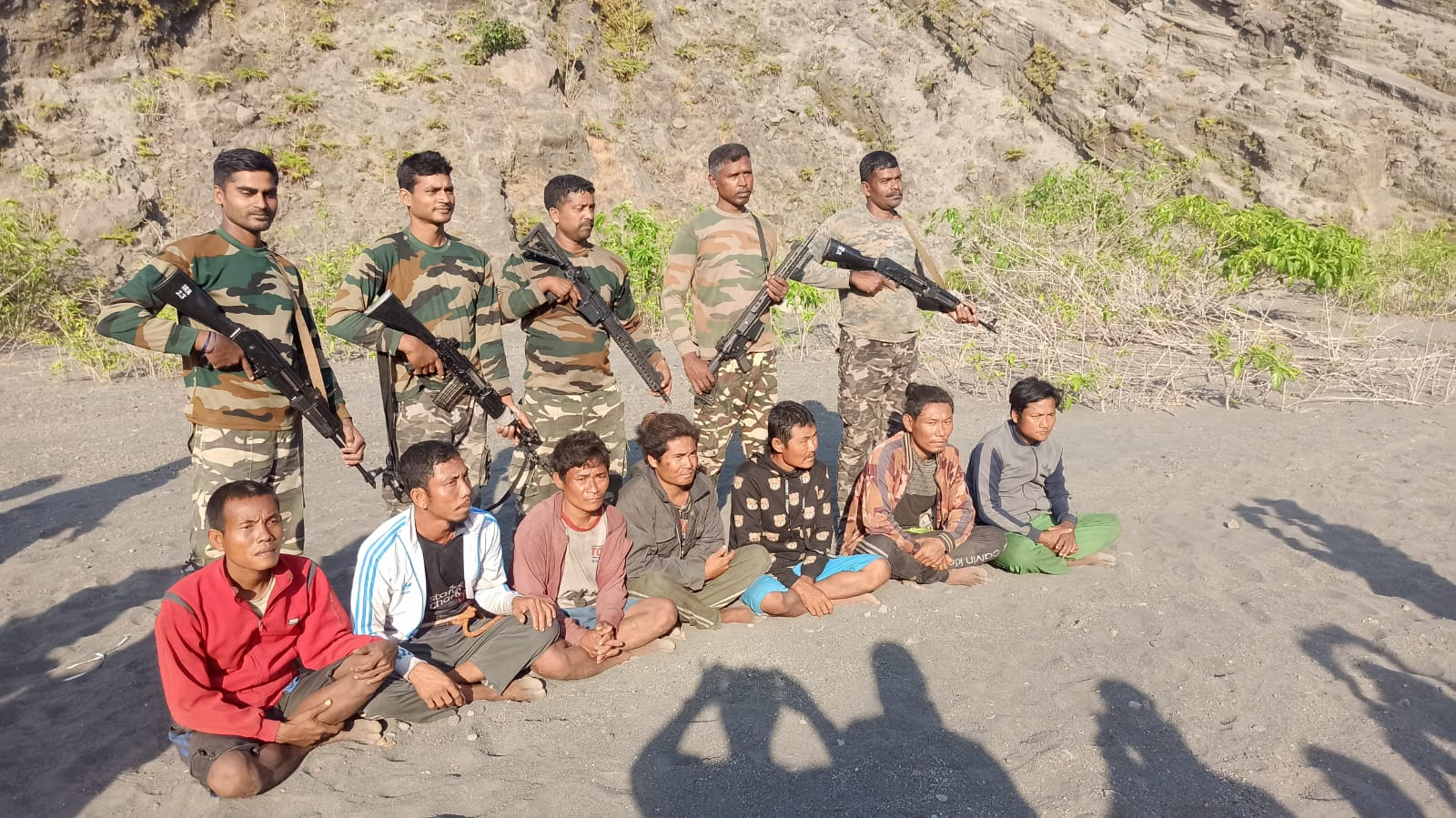
Special Ops by ANP.

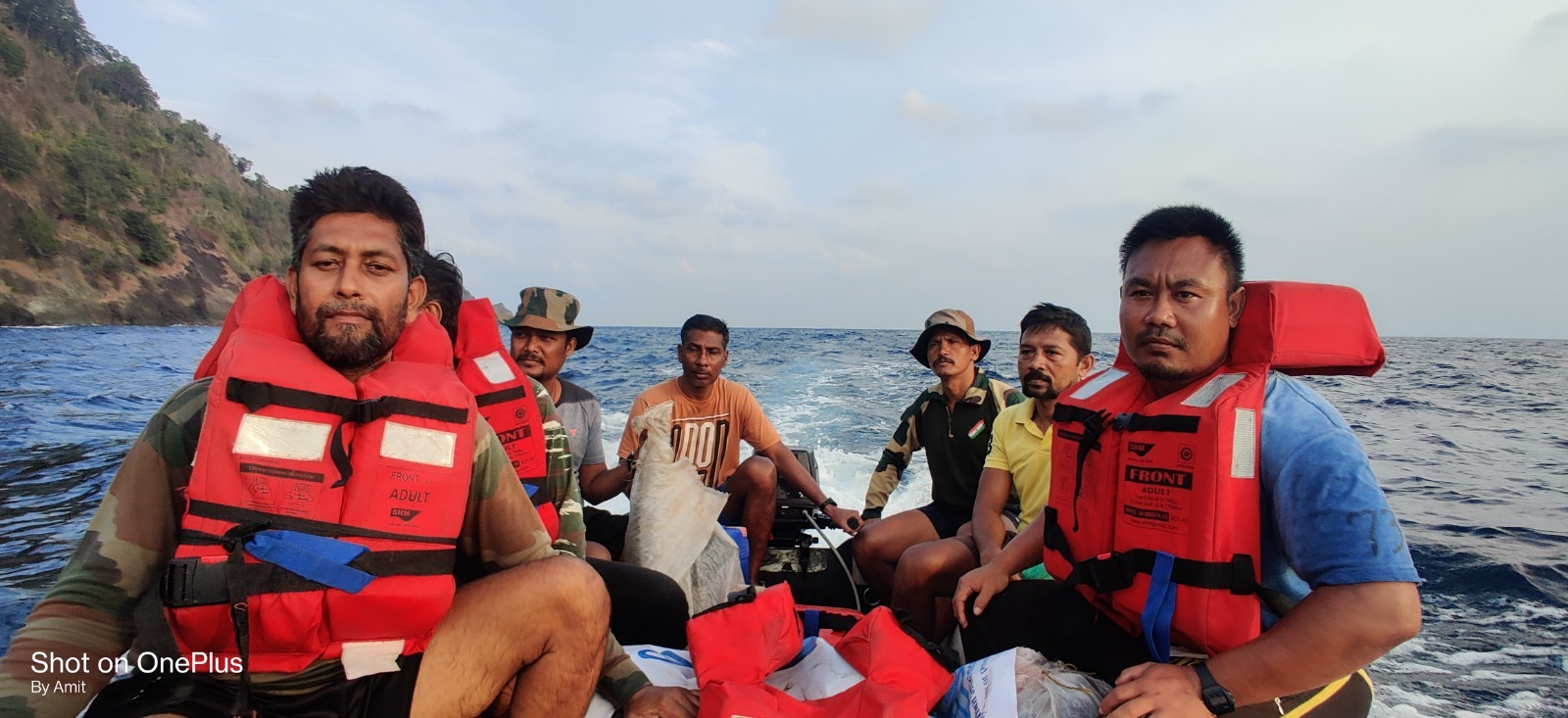
Special Ops by ANP.

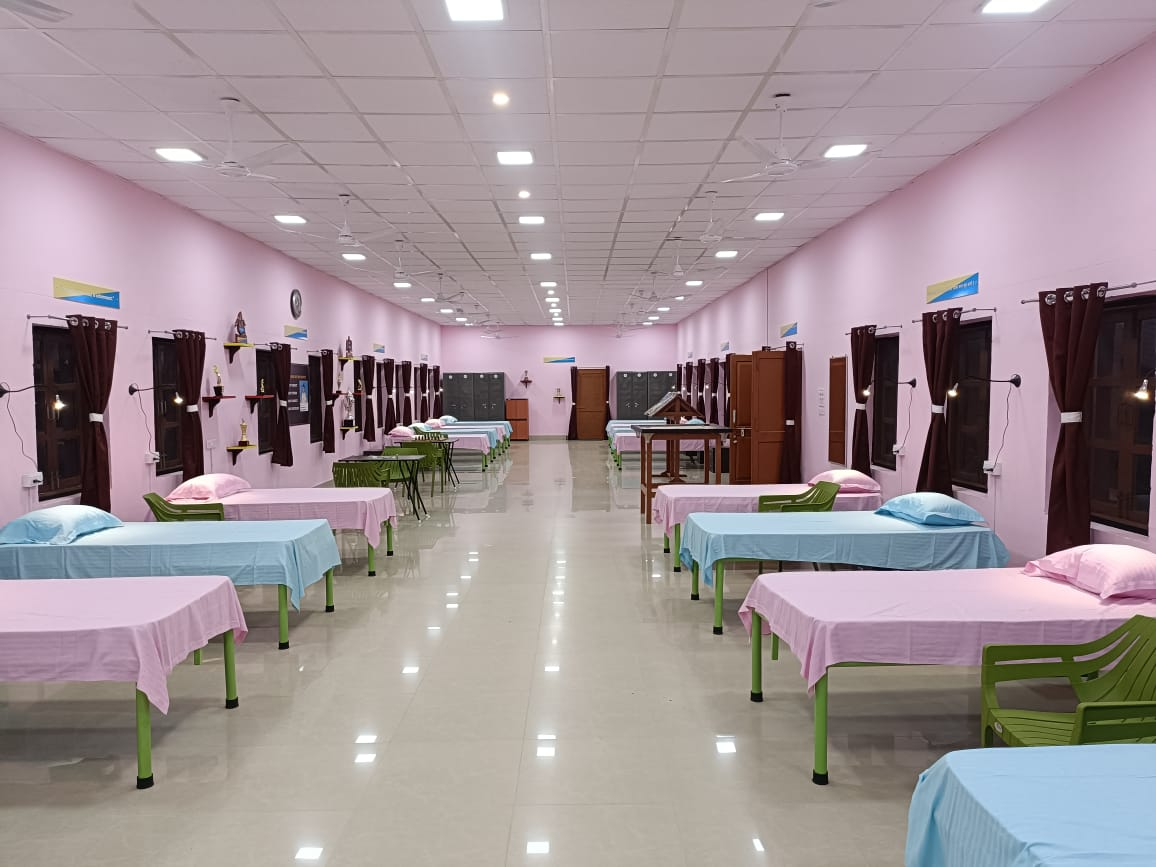
Jawan Barrak

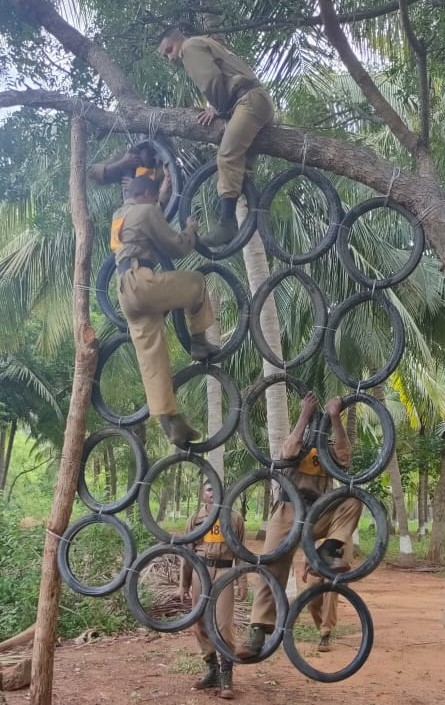
Glimpse of Training

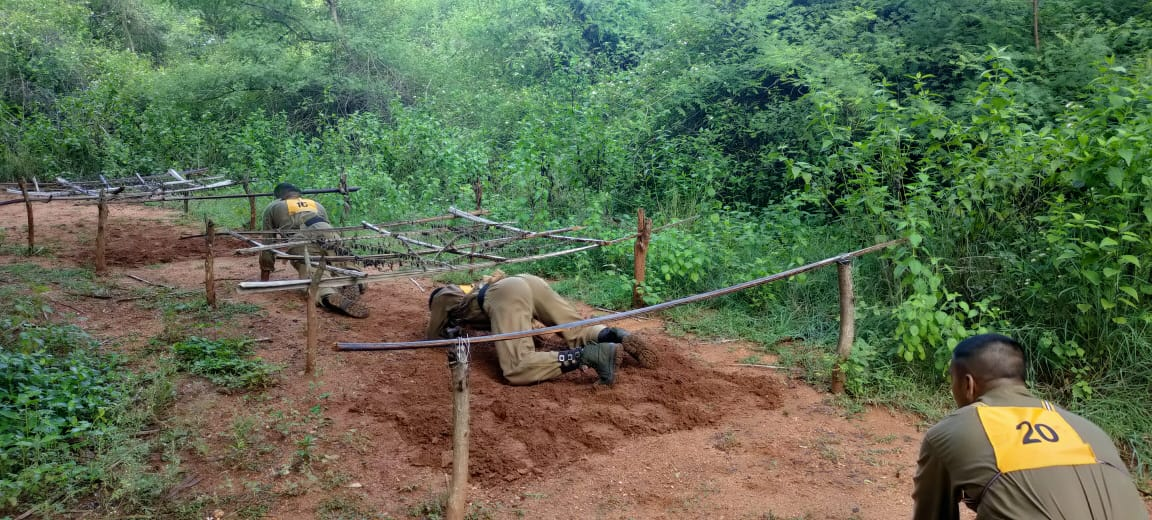
Glimpse of Training

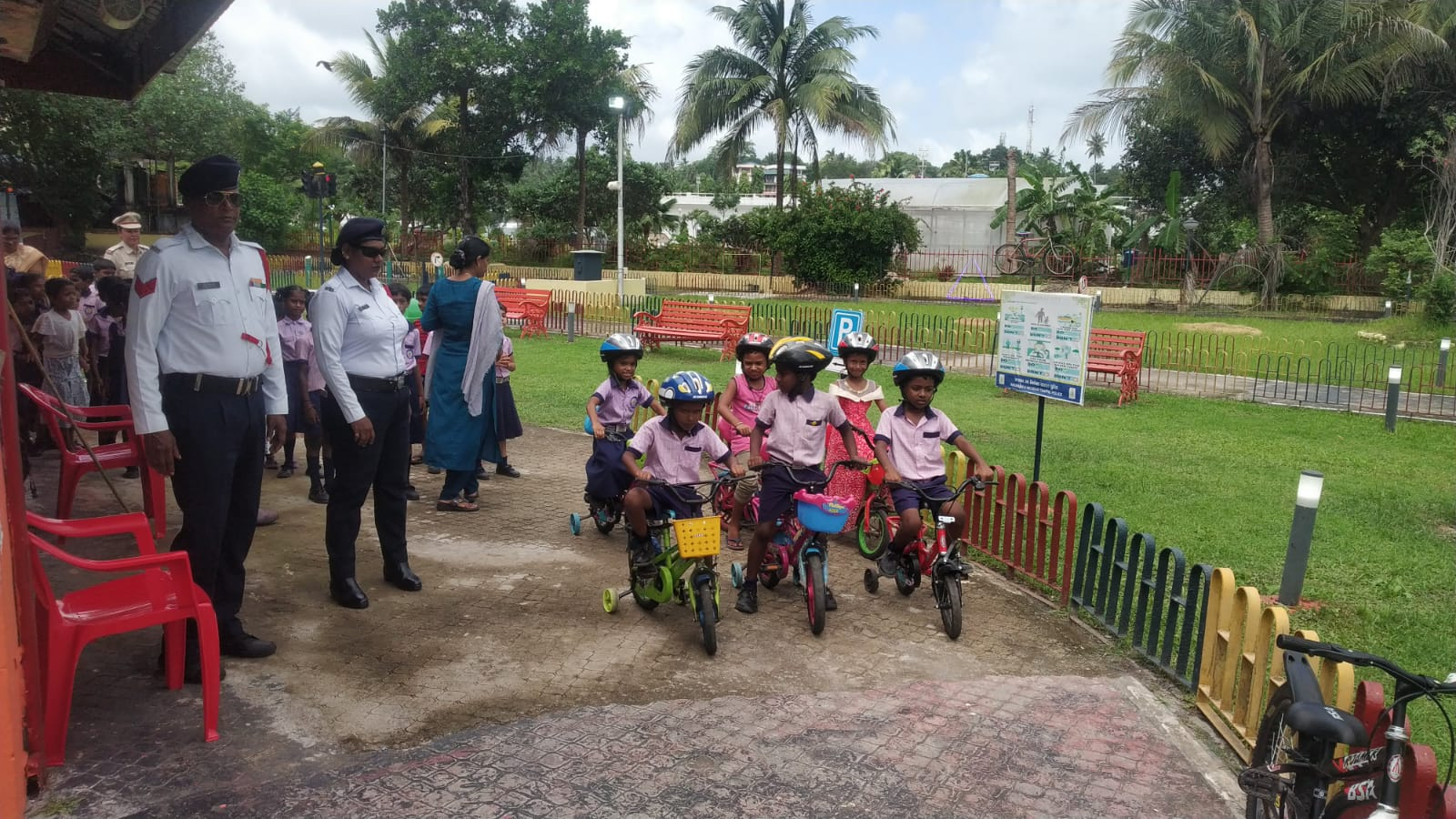
Children's traffic park, ANP
