= Autonomous State Medical College =

Autonomous State Medical College may refer to the following tertiary medical educational establishments in Uttar Pradesh, India:

- Autonomous State Medical College, Auraiya
- Autonomous State Medical College, Ayodhya
- Autonomous State Medical College, Bahraich
- Autonomous State Medical College, Basti
- Autonomous State Medical College, Bijnor
- Autonomous State Medical College, Bulandshahr
- Autonomous State Medical College, Chandauli
- Autonomous State Medical College, Deoria
- Autonomous State Medical College, Etah
- Autonomous State Medical College, Firozabad
- Autonomous State Medical College, Ghazipur
- Autonomous State Medical College, Gonda
- Autonomous State Medical College, Hardoi
- Autonomous State Medical College, Jaunpur
- Autonomous State Medical College, Kanpur Dehat
- Autonomous State Medical College, Kaushambi
- Autonomous State Medical College, Kushinagar
- Autonomous State Medical College, Lakhimpur Kheri
- Autonomous State Medical College, Lalitpur
- Autonomous State Medical College, Mirzapur
- Autonomous State Medical College, Pilibhit
- Autonomous State Medical College, Pratapgarh
- Autonomous State Medical College, Shahjahanpur
- Autonomous State Medical College, Siddharth Nagar
- Autonomous State Medical College, Sonbhadra
- Autonomous State Medical College, Sultanpur
