= Badayuni =

Badayuni or Badauni is an Indian toponymic surname (nisba) for people from Budaun (formerly Badayun and Badaun) in Uttar Pradesh, India. People with this name include:

- `Abd al-Qadir Bada'uni (c. 1540 – c. 1605), Grand Mufti of India during the Mughal era
- Abdul Hamid Qadri Badayuni (1898–1970), Pakistani scholar
- Ada Jafri or Ada Badayuni (1924–2015), Pakistani Urdu poet ad writer
- Shakeel Badayuni (1916–1970), Indian poet and lyricist
- Bekhud Badayuni (1857–1912), Indian Urdu poet
- Fani Badayuni (1879–1961), Indian Urdu poet
- Zamir Ali Badayuni (1941–2003), Pakistani writer and broadcaster
