= Sirsi =

Sirsi may refer to:

- Sirsi, Karnataka, India
- Sirsi, Raebareli, Uttar Pradesh, India
- Sirsi, Uttar Pradesh, India
- Sirsi Assembly constituency, a constituency of the Karnataka Legislative Assembly
- Sirsi Corporation or SirsiDynix, a United States company that produces software and associated services for libraries

== See also ==
- Sirsia
