= Budaun =

- City
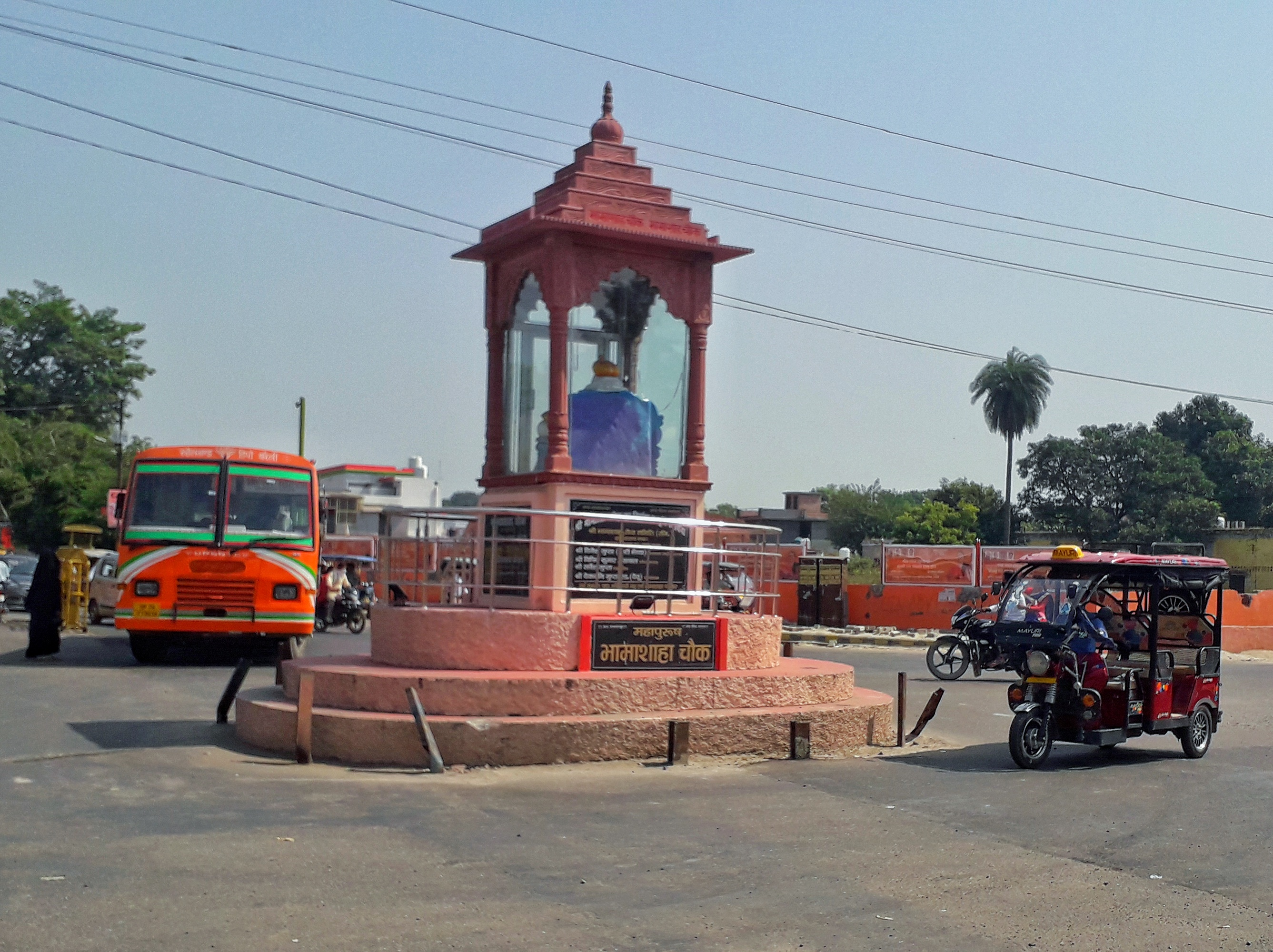
- Bhamashah Chowk, Budaun

- Location in Uttar Pradesh, India
- Coordinates: 28.05°N 79.12°E
- Country: India
- State: Uttar Pradesh
- Region: Rohilkhand
- Division: Bareilly
- District: Budaun
- Settled: 905AD (Modern City), 220BC (Ancient City)
- Named after: Prince Budh

Government
  - Body: Budaun Municipal Council
  - Chairman: Fatma Raza
  - MP: Aditya Yadav
  - MLA: Mahesh Chandra Gupta

Area
  - Total: 81 km^{2} (31 sq mi)
- Elevation: 164 m (538 ft)

Population (2011)
  - Total: 159,221
  - Rank: 17
  - Density: 5,489/km^{2} (14,220/sq mi)
- Demonym: Badayuni

Languages
  - Official: Hindi, Urdu, English
- Time zone: UTC+5:30 (IST)
- PIN: 243601
- Telephone code: 05832
- ISO 3166 code: IN-UP-BD
- Vehicle registration: UP-24
- Coastline: 0 kilometres (0 mi)
- Sex ratio: 907 female/1000 male
- Literacy: 73.00%
- Civic agency: Budaun Development Authority
- Governing body: Government of UP; Government of India
- Climate: HS-TH (Köppen)
- Precipitation: 843 millimetres (33.2 in)
- Avg. annual temperature: 27.5 °C (81.5 °F)
- Avg. summer temperature: 39.8 °C (103.6 °F)
- Avg. winter temperature: 11.5 °C (52.7 °F)
- Website: www.badaun.nic.in
- Also known as 'City of Saints' or 'Madinat ul Awliya', famous for its Pedas, 'Mentha City' of India.

Budaun (romanised: Badāʾūn or Badāyūn, Hindi pronunciation: [bəd̪aːjũː]) is a medieval city and headquarters of Budaun district, in the Indian state of Uttar Pradesh. It is located about a mile east of the Sot river, and 27 km north of the Ganges, in the Rohilkhand region of Uttar Pradesh. According to the 2011 census, Budaun has a population of 159,221, which is projected to be 161,555 at present. Budaun rose to historical importance as the capital of the Delhi Sultanate for four years from 1210 CE to 1214 CE during the reign of Sultan Iltutmish. It was the most important post of Northern Frontier during Mughal reign. Budaun is a big market, historically famous and religiously important city. Budaun is 230 km south-east of New Delhi and 245 km north-west of Lucknow, both taking about 6 hours by road.

== Etymology and archaeology ==
Prof. Goti John referred this city was named Bedamooth in an ancient inscription based on stone scripts at the Lucknow Museum. Later this region was called Panchala. According to the lines on stone scripts there was a village Bhadaunlak near the city. The Muslim historian Roz Khan Lodhi said that Ashoka The Great built a Buddh Vihar and Quila; he named it BuddhMau (Budaun Fort). According to George Smith, Budaun was named after the prince Budh.

=== Recent archaeology ===
Though Budaun is an ancient as well as archaeologically rich city, it has not received much attention or importance in terms of archaeology. Recently, in a village in Budaun known as Kheda Jalalpur village, fragments of Hindu temple idols, ancient bricks have been recovered from the mound of that village. According to the ASI, these remains belong to the post-Gupta period (7th-8th century).

== History ==
According to the (Budaun District, Govt. of Uttar Pradesh) mythological stories, Budaun was named after prince Budh Ahir. The local tradition regarding this city is that it was founded in 905 A.D. by a prince whose name was Budh and after whom it was called Budaun. The ruins of Prasidh (a town on the Ramganga) and the coins discovered at Pachoma near Bareilly point to the existence of an Ahir dynasty around the borders of Badaun and Bareilly in the distant past. An inscription, probably of the 12th century, gives a list of twelve Rathore kings reigning at Budaun then called Vodamāyuta. Kanauj was conquered after 1085 by Mahmūd, the son of the Ghaznavid Sultān, driving out the Rāshtrakūta chief. This the Rāshtrakūta chief then move their capital to Vodamāyuta, where they ruled until conquered by Qutb-ud-din Aibak.

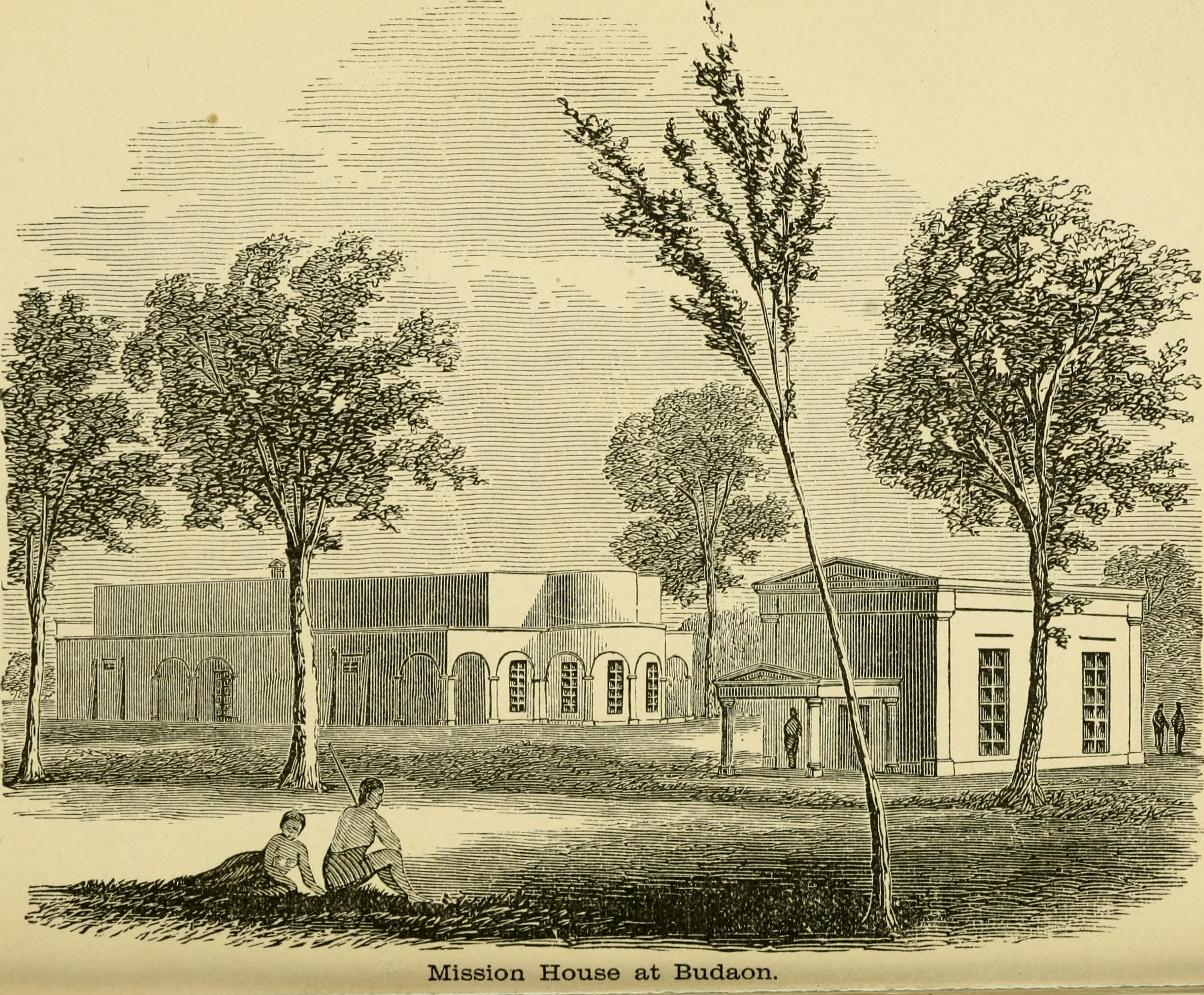
Mission House of the Methodist Episcopal Church at Budaun (1895)

The first authentic historical event connected with it, however, was its capture by Qutb-ud-din Aibak in 1196, after which it became a very important post on the northern frontier of the Delhi empire. In 1223, a mosque of imposing size, crowned with a dome, was built. In the 13th century two of its governors, Shams-ud-din Iltutmish, the builder of the mosque referred above, and his son Rukn ud din Firuz, attained the imperial throne. In 1571 the town was burnt, and about a hundred years later, under Shah Jahan, the seat of the governorship was transferred to Sahaspur-Bilari. Budaun and its district was ceded to the British government in 1801 by the Nawab of Oudh.

In 1911, Budaun was a town and district of British India, in the Rohilkhand division of the United Provinces. At the time, an American Methodist mission maintained several girls' schools and a high school for boys.

== Politics ==
Aditya Yadav is the MP of the Budaun Constituency and is the son of Shivpal Singh Yadav. According to British historian Matthew Atmore Sherring, they came from Hansi and Hisar in Haryana.

== Demographics ==
Religions in Budaun City (2011)
Religion	Percent
Hinduism	55.15%
Islam	43.94%
Christianity	0.62%
Sikhism	0.21%
Others†	0.08%
Distribution of religions

As of 2011 census, Budaun City had a population of 159,221 (83,475 male 75,746 female = 1000/907), 39,613 (12.3%) of whom were aged 0–6. The adult literacy rate was 73.%. The widely spoken language in the city is Hindi and Awadhi. The sex ratio of Budaun city is 907 per 1000 males. Child sex ratio of girls is 882 per 1000 boys. The area of the city is 81 square km. Budaun Metro Area have a population of around 417000 and an area of 103 km^{2} (40 sq mi) With Badaun City, it includes Shekhupur, Bahedi, Islamganj, Chandanpur, Salarpur, Salarpur Industrial Estate, Shekhupur Firing Range, Padauna and Khera Buzurg.

== Education ==
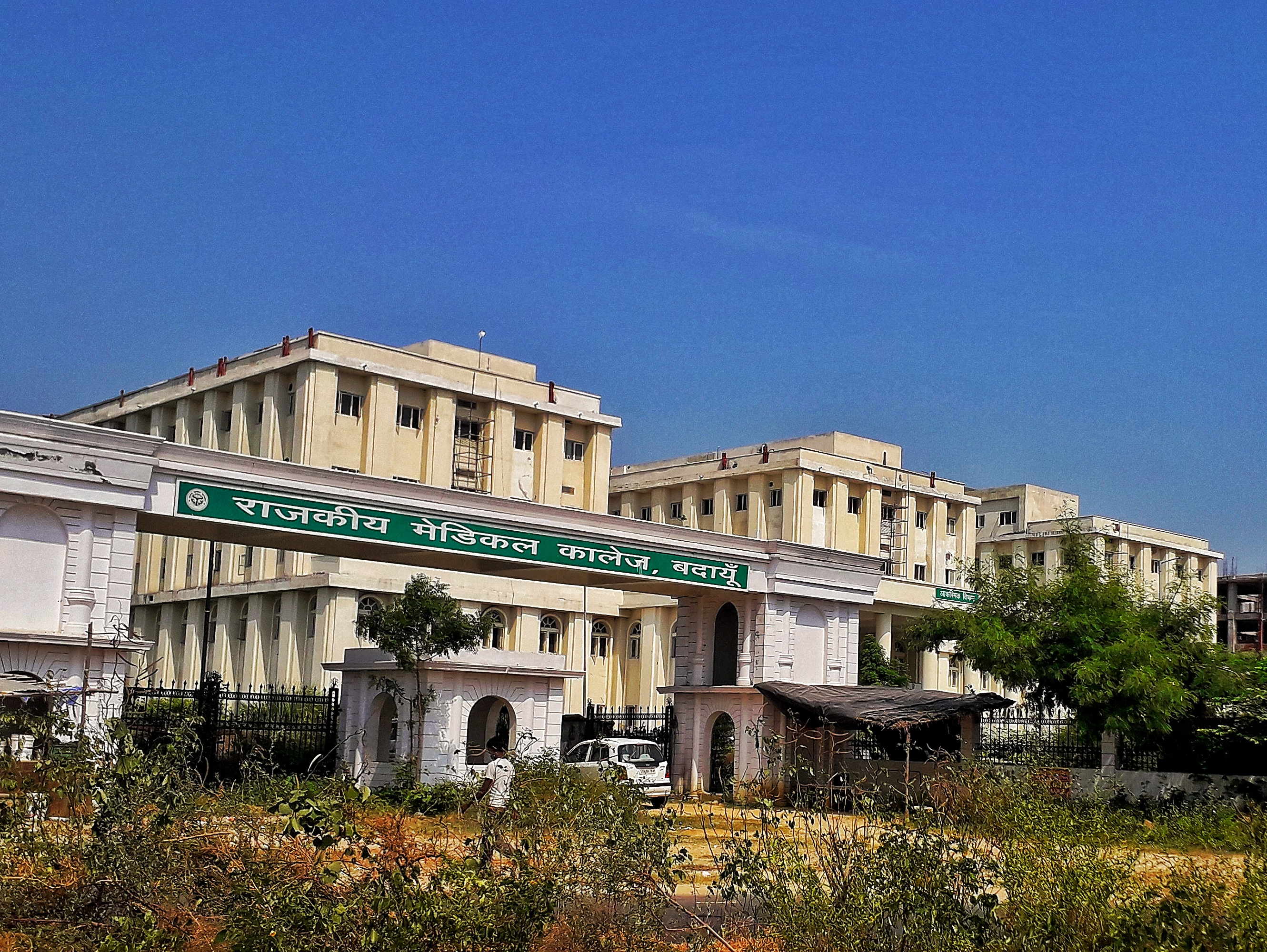
Budaun Medical College

Higher Education institutions in the city include the Government Degree College, Government Girls Degree College and NMNS Dass College, all affiliated to Mahatma Jyotiba Phule Rohilkhand University, Bareilly. The Budaun Medical College, a full-fledged tertiary government Medical college and hospital was established in 2019. The college is affiliated with the Atal Bihari Vajpayee Medical University, Lucknow and is recognized by the National Medical Commission.

== Transport ==
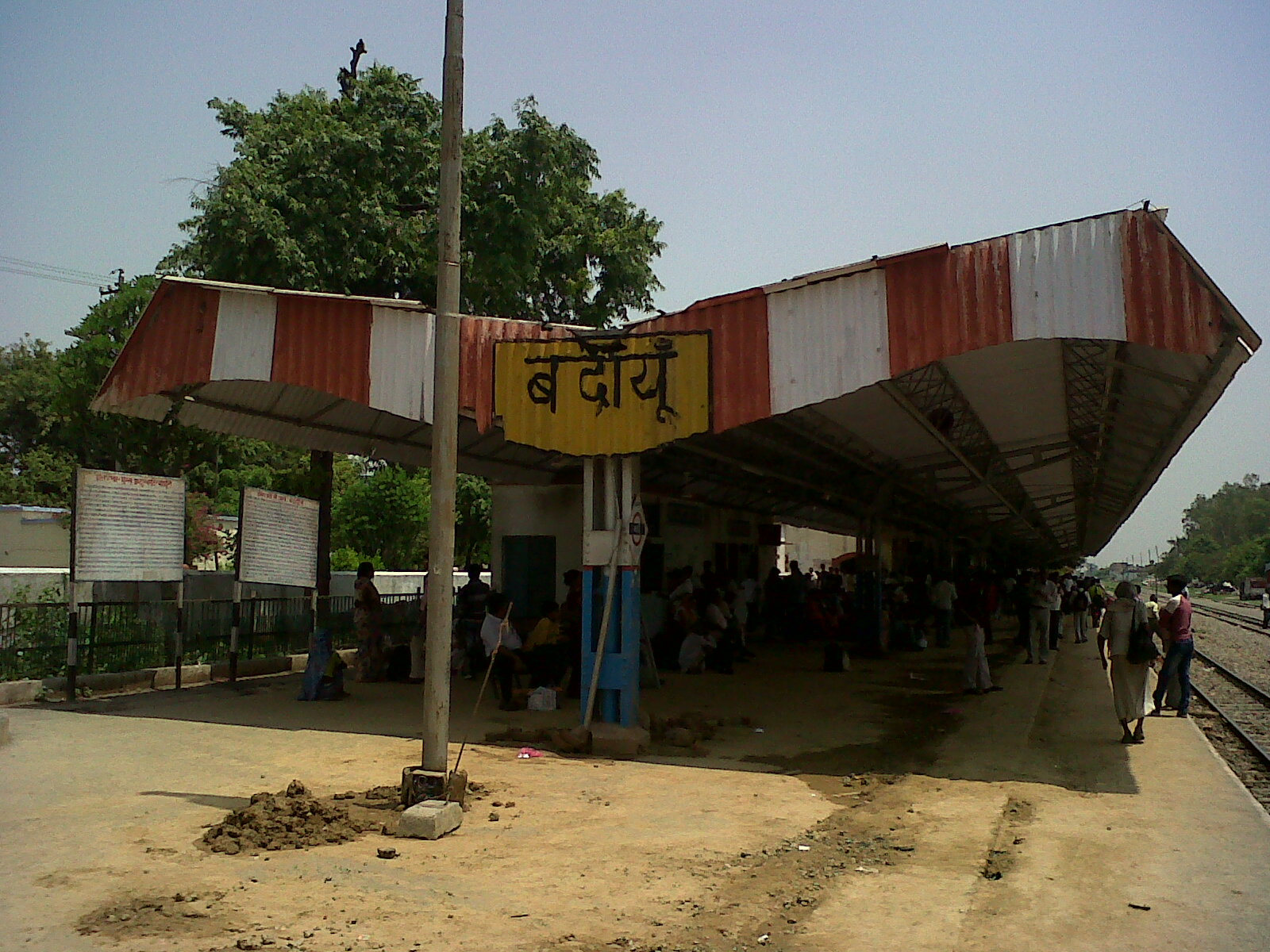
Budaun railway station

Badaun is well connected with the rest of the state through roads and rail services, however the city lacks an airport. The nearest airport is the Bareilly Airport – a civil enclave at the Indian Air Force's 'Trishul Air Base' in Izzatnagar neighborhood of Bareilly, which is located at a distance of 60 kilometres (37 mi) from the city. The Indira Gandhi International Airport, located in Delhi is the nearest International Airport.

The Budaun railway station is the primary railway station serving the city. Budaun is a Category-'NSG 05' station of the Indian Railways, and is located on the Bareilly-Kasganj Rail line under the Izzatnagar railway division of the North Eastern Railway zone. Train Services in Budaun were startes after the completion of the 63 miles (101 km) long Kasganj Extension Line from Bareilly to Soron in 1885 by the Rohilkund and Kumaon Railway.

The National Highway 530B passes through the city and connects it with Bareilly and Mathura. A number of State Highways also pass through the city. Prominent among them are the UP State Highway 18, connecting Budaun with Meerut, UP State Highway 43, connecting Budaun with Moradabad & Farrukhabad and UP State Highway 51, which connects Budaun with Gajraula & Bijnor. Inter-city bus services to and from the city are operated from the Budaun bus station by the Uttar Pradesh State Road Transport Corporation and private operators. The Budaun bus station as well as the Budaun Depot come under the Bareilly region of UPSRTC.

=== Ganga Expressway ===
On 29 April 2026, Primeminister Narendra Modi inaugurated longest expressway of Uttar Pradesh, Ganga Expressway in Binawar, Budaun. The expressway is 594 KM long, which is connected 12 districts of the state (Meerut, Hapur, Bulandshahr, Amroha, Sambhal, Budaun, Shahjahanpur, Hardoi, Unnao, Raebareli, Pratapgarh, and Prayagraj).

== Notable people ==
- ʽAbd al-Qadir Badayuni
- Abdul Hamid Qadri Badayuni
- Abida Ahmed
- Ada Jafri
- Ahmad Yar Khan Naeemi
- Ale Ahmad Suroor
- Alhaj Shamim Uddin
- Bekhud Badayuni
- Dilawar Figar
- Fani Badayuni
- Ghulam Mustafa Khan Hindustani classical vocalist
- Iltutmish
- Inayat Hussain Khan
- Iqbal Hussain Khan Bandanawazi
- Ismat Chughtai
- Jeelani Bano
- Moulvi Fakhrey Alam
- Mahesh Chandra Gupta
- Muhammad Afzal Hussain Qadri
- Nakhshabi
- Nisar Hussain Khan
- Nizamuddin Auliya – Sufi saint
- Rashid Khan
- Razia Sultan
- Ruknuddin Firuz
- Shabnam Romani
- Shakeel Badayuni
- Urmilesh Shankhdhar
- Zamir Ali Badayuni

== See also ==
- Badayuni
- Panchala
- Sotha
- Shyam Nagar
- Civil Lines, Budaun
- Great Mosque, Budaun
