= Sotha =

- Neighbourhood
- Location in Uttar Pradesh, India
- Coordinates: 28.05°N 79.12°E
- Country: India
- State: Uttar Pradesh
- District: Badaun district, Uttar Pradesh
- Metro: Budaun Metro Area, Uttar Pradesh

Government
  - Body: Budaun Municipal Corporation

Population (2016 (estimated))
  - Total: 66,665

Languages
  - Official: Urdu
- Time zone: UTC+5:30 (IST)
- Postal code: 243601
- Lok Sabha constituency: Badaun (Lok Sabha constituency), Uttar Pradesh
- Vidhan Sabha constituency: Budaun City, Bareilly division, Uttar Pradesh
- Civic agency: Budaun Municipal Corporation

Sotha is the oldest area of the city of Budaun, Uttar Pradesh. The locality is largely a residential area, with a majority Muslim population. A considerable number of inhabitants comes from the nearby city of Sahaswan.

In November 2024, a Hindu outfit, Neelkanth Mahadev mandir, filed a petition in the local court against the masjid and sought permission to conduct prayers in the mosque premises. The mosque is also believed to be the third oldest existing and seventh largest mosque in the country, with a capacity of housing 23,500 people.

== Location ==
Iconic Shakeel Badayuni Road passes through Sotha. SH33 (Agra-Budaun-Bareilly) and Ring Road border it on opposite ends. The nearest bus stop is Lal Pul, about 600 m away. Budaun City Bus Stand is 1.5 km away and Budaun Railway Station is 2.5 km away.

== Major landmarks ==
- Jama Masjid Shamsi
- GhantaGhar
- Ruins of Budaun Fort

== Commercial areas ==
- Greenwood Public School
- Islamic Darsgah Madrasa School
- Ganga Market
- Plaza Market

== See also ==
- Budaun
- Budaun Metro Area
