= Sanay, Budaun =

Sanay Sanai
- village
- Location in Uttar Pradesh, India Sanay (India)
- Coordinates: 28.08°N 79.07°E
- Country: India
- State: Uttar Pradesh
- District: Badaun

Government
  - Body: Gram panchayat

Population (2011 Census of India)
  - Total: 683

Languages
  - Official: Hindi
- Time zone: UTC+5:30 (IST)
- PIN: 243601
- Vehicle registration: UP 24

Sanay is a village in Budaun district, Uttar Pradesh. Its village code is 128237. It is located on the right side of river Sot. Sanai is a medium size village located in Budaun of Budaun district, Uttar Pradesh with total 118 families residing. The Sanai village has population of 683 of which 366 are males while 317 are females as per Population Census 2011.

According to Census 2011 information the location code or village code of Sanai village is 128237. Sanai village is located in Budaun Tehsil of Budaun district in Uttar Pradesh, India. It is situated 10 km away from Budaun, which is both district & sub-district headquarter of Sanai village. As per 2009 stats, Gurupuri Binaik is the gram panchayat of Sanai village.

The total geographical area of village is 132.92 hectares. Sanai has a total population of 683 peoples. There are about 118 houses in Sanai village. Budaun is nearest town to Sanai which is approximately 10 km away.

In Sanai village population of children with age 0-6 is 92 which makes up 13.47% of total population of village. Average Sex Ratio of Sanai village is 866 which is lower than Uttar Pradesh state average of 912. Child Sex Ratio for the Sanai as per census is 1091, higher than Uttar Pradesh average of 902.

Sanai village has higher literacy rate compared to Uttar Pradesh. In 2011, literacy rate of Sanai village was 68.53% compared to 67.68% of Uttar Pradesh. In Sanai Male literacy stands at 80.75% while female literacy rate was 53.90%.

As per constitution of India and Panchyati Raaj Act, Sanai village is administrated by Sarpanch (Head of Village) who is elected representative of village.

Sanai - Village Overview
Gram Panchayat :	Gurupuri Binaik
Block / Tehsil :	Budaun
District :	Budaun
State :	Uttar Pradesh
Pincode :	N/A
Area :	132.92 hectares
Population :	683
Households :	118
Nearest Town :	Budaun (10 km)

== Connectivity of Sanai ==
Type Status

Public Bus Service Available within <2 km distance

Private Bus Service Available within <2 km distance

Railway Station Available within 10 km distance
