= Moulvi Fakhrey Alam =

Maulvi Fakhre Alam

MLA, 8th Legislative Assembly
- In office June 1980 – March 1985
- Preceded by: Himself
- Succeeded by: Nirottam Singh
- Constituency: Usehat, Budaun District

MLA, 7th Legislative Assembly
- In office June 1977 – February 1980
- Preceded by: Brijpal Yadav
- Succeeded by: Himself
- Constituency: Usehat, Budaun District

Personal details
- Born: 22 March 1922 Budaun, United Provinces, British India
- Died: 17 November 1991 (aged 69) UP Bhavan, New Delhi, India
- Resting place: Jogipura, District Bijnor, Uttar Pradesh, India
- Party: Indian National Congress
- Spouse: Farhat Jahan Begum (wife)
- Children: Anwer Alam; Shaheen Rizvi; Ikram Azhar Alam; Seema Abbas; Meena Maqsood; Deeba Syed
- Parent(s): Ikram Alam (father); Qamar Jahan Begum (mother)
- Education: Aligarh Muslim University
- Profession: Zamindar, lawyer and politician

Moulvi Fakhre Alam (22 March 1922 – 17 November 1991) was a zamindar, lawyer and politician in Budaun District. He was, for most of his career, associated with the Indian National Congress Party. He represented Usehat constituency in the 8th Legislative Assembly of UP.

== Early life and education ==
Alam was born on 22 March 1922 in Budaun, in Khandan-e-Bani Hameed, a clan of erstwhile Qazis and Zamindars. His father, Maulvi Ikram Alam, was a well known Zamindar, lawyer and politician of the region and played an active part in the state's politics. He was a member of the District Board of Budaun. He also served as the Chief Legal Advisor of Rampur State during the reign of Nawab Hamid Ali Khan and Nawab Raza Ali Khan.

Alam was initially educated at Govt. High School, Budaun. He received his law degree from Aligarh Muslim University, Aligarh.

== Political career ==
Upon the death of his father Ikram Alam in 1942, Fakhre Alam inherited the zamindari and was a zamindar of several villages in Budaun District until the abolition of zamindari in 1952.

Alam was active in youth politics at an early age. He served as the National Secretary of All India Muslim Students Federation, the youth wing of Muslim League.

He contested his first election in 1951 for Budaun Municipality. He was elected as its member consecutively for three terms, in 1951, 1953 and 1957. He also served as the Education Chairman of Budaun Municipality. In 1957, he was appointed by the UP Govt. as District Govt. Counsel (Civil) for Budaun District. He held this office from 1957 to 1967 and 1969.

In 1969, Alam contested the assembly election from Budaun on Indian National Congress's ticket, but he came second, losing to Jan Sangh's Kishanswaroop Vaish by 10,000 votes. From then onwards, Alam became much active in the state's politics with the Congress Party. Alam, along with SK Goel, Raja Purshottamlal Bhadwar, Asrar Ahmad, Mir Mazhar Ali and others became the key leaders of the Congress Party in Budaun District. In 1973, Akbar Ali Khan, the then Governor of Uttar Pradesh, paid a visit to Alam in Budaun.

In 1974, 1977 and 1980, he contested assembly elections from Usehat, Budaun. During these elections, several key politicians of the Indian National Congress including Indira Gandhi, the then Prime Minister of India, Jagjivan Ram, Kamlapati Tripathi, Hemvati Nandan Bahuguna, Ammar Rizvi and others met him at Budaun. In the 1980 assembly elections, he contested from the breakaway faction of congress, Indian National Congress (Urs) and made a landslide victory by defeating INC(I) candidate Nirottam Singh. Following the elections, he became the leader of the Congress Urs Legislature party in UP Assembly.

After 1985, though his health declined, he still remained active in state politics. He played an active role during the Babri Masjid Movement, and was made the Chairman of Babri Masjid Action Committee.

== Death and legacy ==
After 1985, his health started to decline. In November 1991, he was in Delhi for his routine checkup. In the evening of 17 November 1991, he had a severe heart attack and died several minutes later at UP Bhavan, New Delhi.

He was laid to rest in Jogipura (Bijnor) in the graveyard of Dargah Najafe Hind.

Alam had a very kind and gentle attitude towards the general public, especially the poor. He was much loved and respected by the people of Budaun and was affectionately called "Moulvi Fakhre Alam" or "Moulvi Sahab", meaning "learned man".
