= Hindu College, Moradabad =

Hindu College Moradabad
- Budh Bazaar, Moradabad; Uttar Pradesh; India

Information
- Type: Public
- Established: 1949
- Principal: Prof. S.S.Rawat
- Campus: Urban
- Affiliations: Guru Jambheshwar University Moradabad
- Website: hinducollege.edu.in

Hindu College, Moradabad is a public college in Moradabad, Uttar Pradesh, India. It is run by the Hindu Educational Society and offers undergraduate and postgraduate programmes in arts, science, commerce, education and other disciplines. The college was established as a middle school in 1911 and became a degree college in 1949.

== History ==
Hindu College was established in 1911 as a middle school. In 1916 it was upgraded in a high school and in 1937 it was converted into an intermediate college. In 1949 and 1950 it was recognized as Degree and Post Graduate College, respectively. Until 1960 B.Sc., M.Sc. (Maths), Commerce and B.Ed. classes were functioning, after that in 1961 courses of Art Faculty was established at the undergraduate level. In the succeeding years these courses were started at the post graduate level:

- 1963 Chemistry
- 1965 Physics and English
- 1966 Zoology
- 1966 Botany
- 1969 Hindi and Economics
- 1971 Sociology
- 1972 Geography and Botany
- 1977 Education (M.Ed.) and Political Science
- 1983 Psychology
- 1984 Sanskrit
- 2006 Urdu and Defense studies

Hindu College was first affiliated to Agra University and later with Mahatma Jyotiba Phule Rohilkhand University and currently affiliated with Guru Jambheshwar University Moradabad

== Academics ==
Courses in the Arts and Sciences are offered by the college in accordance with the syllabus and prescriptions of the Mahatma Jyotoba Phule Rohilkhand University. Every student is required to work towards a degree with a specific choice of subjects. The duration of M.A./M.Sc. programmes (post graduate) is two years; that of B.A., B.Sc. and B.Com. is three years.

- Department of Commerce
- Department of Mathematics
- Department of Physics
- Department of Chemistry
- Department of Zoology
- Department of Botany
- Department of Statistics
- Department of Economics
- Department of Political Science
- Department of Sociology
- Department of Psychology
- Department of History
- Department of Geography
- Department of Commerce
- Department of Defense Studies
- Department of Education
- Department of Hindi
- Department of English
- Department of Sanskrit
- Department of Urdu
- Department of Physical Education
- Department of Biotechnology
- Department of Home Science

== See also ==
- Mahatma Gandhi Memorial Post Graduate College
- Government Degree College Sambhal
