= Government Post-Graduate College, Sambhal =

College in Uttar Pradesh, India

Government PG College Sambhal
- Type: Public
- Established: 2005
- Founder: Government of Uttar Pradesh
- Affiliations: M. J. P. Rohilkhand University
- Principal: Prabha Sharma
- Students: 1600
- Location: Sambhal, Uttar Pradesh, India
- Campus: Urban
- Website: www.gpgcollegesbl.org

Government Degree College Sambhal is a post-graduate college in Sambhal affiliated with M. J. P. Rohilkhand University in Bareilly, India. It offers undergraduate and postgraduate courses in science, arts, and commerce. It is one of the main degree colleges in the city. The college was established in 2005 with graduation in B.A. and B.Com. After some years, the college started offering B.Sc., M.A. and M.Com. classes.

== History ==
The college was established in 2005 by the government of Uttar Pradesh with the great effort of Ram Gopal Yadav, then the member of parliament from Sambhal (Lok Sabha constituency). Social worker Parvez Khan donated his 2.597-hectare land to the college. In July 2005, arts and commerce classes were started. In 2008, the construction of the college building was completed, and science classes also started. In 2014, post-graduation classes of Commerce and Arts (Hindi, Sociology, Political Science & Economics) were also started.

== Campus ==
The campus is approximately 6.6 acres (2.7 ha). It also has a seminar room. The college maintains a playground and a sports complex. Basketball, Cricket, and table tennis are organized under the supervision of the director of physical education. The college has well equipped physics, chemistry and Biology laboratories, and NSS rooms.⁣

=== Library ===
The college has a library.

=== Hostel ===
The college has a boy hostel. The hostel provides residential facilities to undergraduate and postgraduate male students.

== Courses ==
The college gives degrees in

- Bachelor of Arts (B.A.),
- Bachelor of Commerce (B.Com),
- Bachelor of Science (B.Sc),
- Master of Arts (M.A.) and
- Master of Commerce (M.Com)

The college has offered three-years degree courses (T.D.C.) such

=== Undergraduate courses ===
- Hindi
- English
- History
- Economics
- Sociology
- Political science
- Commerce
- Physics
- Chemistry
- Mathematics
- Zoology
- Botany

=== Postgraduate courses ===
- Hindi
- Economics
- Sociology
- Political Science
- Commerce

== See also ==
- Hindu Degree College, Moradabad
- Government Medical College, Badaun
- Autonomous State Medical College, Hardoi
- Autonomous State Medical College, Shahjahanpur
