= Sirsi, Uttar Pradesh =

Sirsi Sirsi Sadat
- Town
- Location in Uttar Pradesh, India Sirsi (India)
- Coordinates: 28.64°N 78.64°E
- Country: India
- State: Uttar Pradesh
- District: Sambhal
- Elevation: 210 m (690 ft)

Population (2011)
  - Total: 64,345

Languages
  - Official: Hindi/Urdu
- Time zone: UTC+5:30 (IST)
- Postal code: 244301
- Vehicle registration: UP 38
- Website: up.gov.in

Sirsi is a town and a Nagar Panchayat in the Sambhal district of the Indian state of Uttar Pradesh.

== Geography ==
Sirsi, Uttar Pradesh is located at 28.64°N 78.64°E. It has an average elevation of 210 metres (688 feet).

== Demographics ==
As of 2011, the Indian census, Sirsi had a population of 64,345. Males constitute 52% of the population and females 48%. Sirsi has a literacy rate of 70%, which is above the national average: male literacy is 78%, and female literacy is 64%. In Sirsi, 19% of the population is under 6 years of age.

Religions in Sirsi Sadat
Religion	Percent
Muslims	72%
Hindus	27%
Jains	0.5%
Others†	0.5%
Distribution of religions †Includes Sikhs (0.2%), Buddhists (<0.2%).

== See also ==
- Sambhal
- Sarai Tarin
- Mahatma Gandhi Memorial Post Graduate College
- Government Degree College Sambhal
