= Indian National Congress (U) =

- Abbreviation: INC(U)
- Secretary: A. K. Antony
- Founder: D. Devaraj Urs
- Founded: July 1979
- Split from: Indian National Congress
- Succeeded by: Indian Congress (Socialist)
- Colours: Purple
- ECI Status: Dissolved Party

The Indian National Congress (U) was a breakaway faction of the Indira Gandhi-led Congress (I), formed in July 1979 by D. Devaraj Urs, the then Chief Minister of Karnataka. Urs' explanation of the split was the return of Indira's son Sanjay Gandhi into the party fold. Urs took with him many legislators from Karnataka, Kerala, Maharashtra and Goa including future Union Ministers and Chief Ministers, Yashwantrao Chavan, Dev Kant Baruah, Kasu Brahmananda Reddy, A.K. Antony, Sharad Pawar, Sarat Chandra Sinha, Priyaranjan Das Munshi and K. P. Unnikrishnan.

== History ==
Subsequently, D. Devaraj Urs joined Janata Party; Yashwantrao Chavan, Brahmananda Reddy, and Chidambaram Subramaniam joined Congress (Indira); and A. K. Antony split from Congress (U) to form Congress (A) in Kerala. When Sharad Pawar took over the party presidency in October 1981, the name of the party was changed to Indian Congress (Socialist).

== Leaders ==
- D. Devaraj Urs
- Yashwantrao Chavan
- Jagjivan Ram
- Kasu Brahmananda Reddy
- Dev Kant Baruah
- Vasantdada Patil
- Sharad Pawar
- Swaran Singh
- Chidambaram Subramaniam
- Siddhartha Shankar Ray
- Moulvi Fakhrey Alam
- Sarat Chandra Sinha
- Vayalar Ravi
- Karan Singh
- Priyaranjan Das Munshi
- Ambika Soni
- Oommen Chandy
- P. C. Chacko
- K.P. Unnikrishnan
- P. J. Kurien
- A. C. Shanmughadas
- K. C. Pant

== See also ==
- Indian National Congress breakaway parties
