= Government Medical College, Badaun =

Government medical college in Uttar Pradesh, India

- राजकीय मेडिकल कॉलेज, बदायूँ
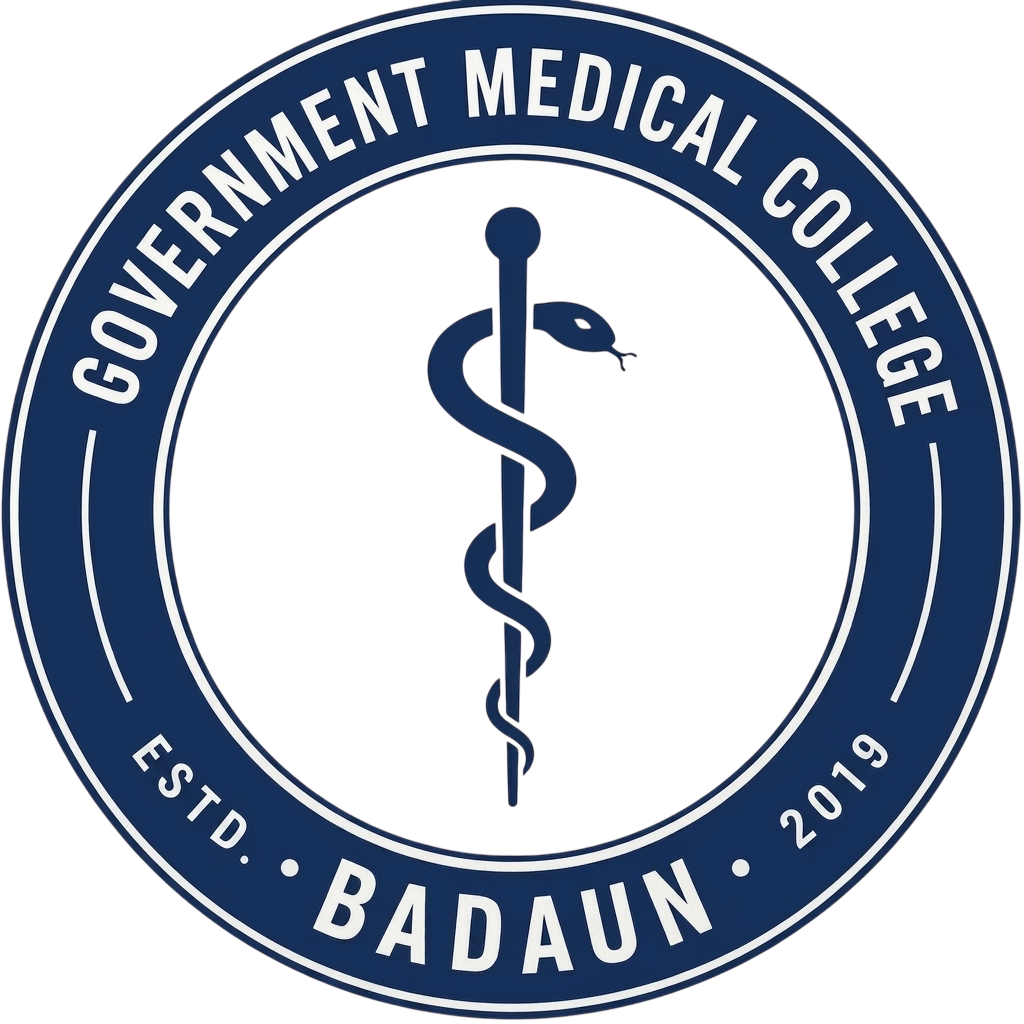
- Seal of Government Medical College, Badaun
- Type: Public medical school
- Established: 2019; 7 years ago
- Affiliations: Atal Bihari Vajpayee Medical University
- Principal: Prof. Dr. Sheo Kumar
- Location: Badaun, Uttar Pradesh, India; 28°1′4″N 79°4′54″E
- Campus: 106 acres (43 ha); Urban
- Language: English
- Website: gmcbadaun.edu.in

Government Medical College, Badaun (also spelled Budaun, and known as Badaun Medical College) is a government medical college and tertiary care teaching hospital located in Badaun, Uttar Pradesh, India. Established in 2019 by the Government of Uttar Pradesh, the institution is affiliated with Atal Bihari Vajpayee Medical University and recognised by the National Medical Commission.

The college provides undergraduate medical education (MBBS) along with healthcare services through its associated teaching hospital serving Badaun district and nearby regions of western Uttar Pradesh.

== History ==
The associated hospital infrastructure was initially developed in 2015 under the Government of Uttar Pradesh. The medical college was formally established in 2019 with approval for MBBS admissions and an initial intake capacity of 100 students.

Since its establishment, the institution has expanded academic and clinical services to support medical education and regional healthcare delivery.

== Campus ==
The campus of Government Medical College, Badaun spans approximately 106 acres (43 ha) and includes academic buildings, lecture halls, laboratories, hostels, and residential facilities for staff and faculty.

=== Infrastructure ===
The campus includes:

- Lecture theatres
- Demonstration rooms
- Central library
- Laboratories for pre-clinical and para-clinical departments
- Administrative block

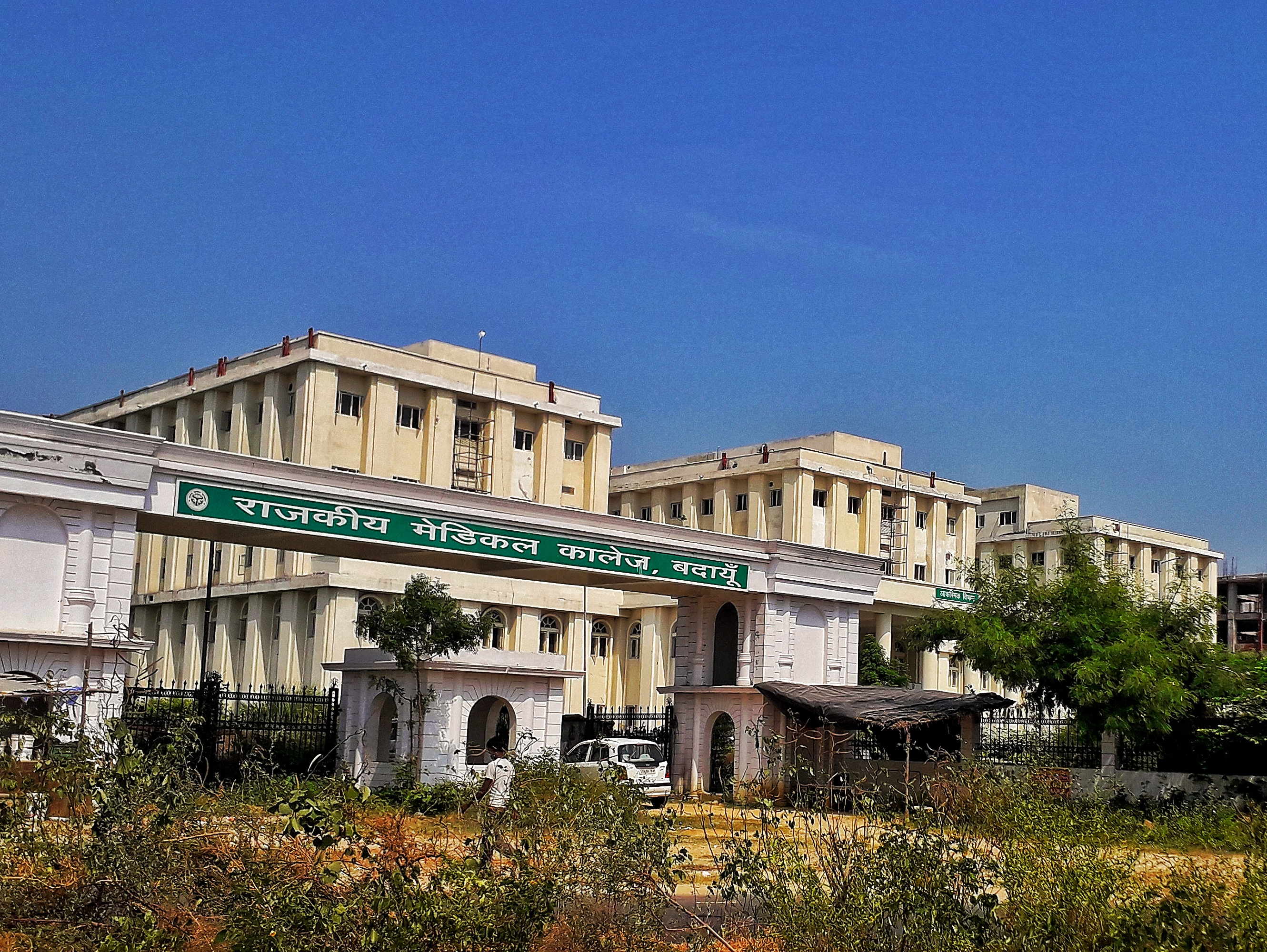
Hospital Building of Government Medical College, Badaun

=== Hospital ===
The associated teaching hospital provides tertiary healthcare services, including outpatient (OPD), inpatient (IPD), emergency, and diagnostic facilities. It serves as a referral centre for patients from Badaun district and surrounding rural regions.

== Academics ==
The college offers undergraduate medical education leading to the Bachelor of Medicine and Bachelor of Surgery (MBBS) degree.

Admission to the MBBS programme is based on the National Eligibility cum Entrance Test (NEET-UG), conducted by the National Testing Agency (NTA).

The institution is affiliated with Atal Bihari Vajpayee Medical University.

=== Courses ===
- MBBS
- BSc Nursing
- Paramedical courses

== Departments ==
=== Pre-clinical departments ===
- Anatomy
- Physiology
- Biochemistry

=== Para-clinical departments ===
- Pathology
- Pharmacology
- Microbiology
- Forensic Medicine
- Community Medicine

=== Clinical departments ===
- General Medicine
- General Surgery
- Obstetrics and Gynaecology
- Paediatrics
- Orthopaedics
- Ophthalmology
- Otorhinolaryngology (ENT)
- Anaesthesiology
- Dermatology

== Hospital ==
The attached teaching hospital functions as a tertiary care centre for the region and provides medical services across multiple specialties. It includes emergency care, outpatient clinics, inpatient wards, and diagnostic laboratories.

The hospital also serves as a training centre for undergraduate medical students.

== See also ==
- All India Institute of Medical Sciences, New Delhi
- King George's Medical University
- Atal Bihari Vajpayee Medical University
