= Y. D. Sharma (professor) =

Indian molecular biologist (born 1951)

- Born: 22 July 1951 (age 75); Gangtok, Sikkim, India
- Education: Agra University; M. J. P. Rohilkhand University; AIIMS Delhi; University of Connecticut Health Center; Public Health Research Institute
- Known for: Studies on molecular biology of malaria
- Awards: 1994 Shanti Swarup Bhatnagar Prize; 1997 Dr. M.O.T. Iyangar Memorial Prize; 2001 National Academy of Vector Borne Diseases Award
- Scientific career
- Fields: Molecular biology
- Workplaces: National Institute of Malaria Research; AIIMS Delhi
- Doctoral advisor: Marvin Lawrence Tanzer

Yagya Dutta Sharma (born 22 July 1951) is an Indian molecular biologist, professor and head of the department of biotechnology at the All India Institute of Medical Sciences, Delhi. An elected fellow of all three major Indian science academies — Indian National Science Academy, Indian Academy of Sciences, and National Academy of Sciences, India — Sharma is known for his research on the molecular biology of malaria. The Council of Scientific and Industrial Research, the apex agency of the Government of India for scientific research, awarded him the Shanti Swarup Bhatnagar Prize for Science and Technology for his contributions to medical sciences in 1994.

== Biography ==
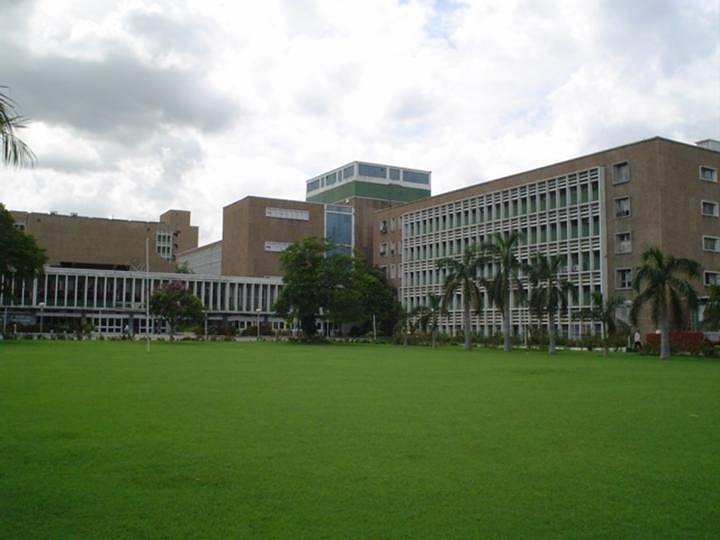
All India Institute of Medical Sciences, Delhi

Born on 22 July 1951, Y. D. Sharma did his early college studies at Dr. Bhimrao Ambedkar University (formerly known as Agra University) from where he earned his bachelor's (BSc) and master's (MSc) degrees. Subsequently, he did his doctoral studies at M. J. P. Rohilkhand University and after securing a PhD for his thesis on serum glycoproteins in 1981, he did the first part of his post-doctoral work at the All India Institute of Medical Sciences, Delhi where his work was based on fluorosis. Moving to the University of Connecticut Health Center in 1982, Sharma continued his post-doc work at the laboratory of Marvin Lawrence Tanzer on molecular biology and biochemistry of collagens. However, when he moved to Public Health Research Institute in 1984, his focus shifted to molecular parasitology which remained the main theme of his researches thereafter. He returned to India to join National Institute of Malaria Research (erstwhile Malaria Research Centre) as a Pool Officer but his stay at NIMR lasted only six months until he was appointed as an associate professor at AIIMS Delhi where he established a laboratory for researches on molecular parasitology. Sharma continues at AIIMS as a professor since 1998 and heads the department of biotechnology while serving as the coordinator of Bioinformatics Centre of the institution. In 2011, he also served as a part of the two-member committee constituted to investigate the plagiarism charges against one of the senior doctors of AIIMS.

== Legacy ==
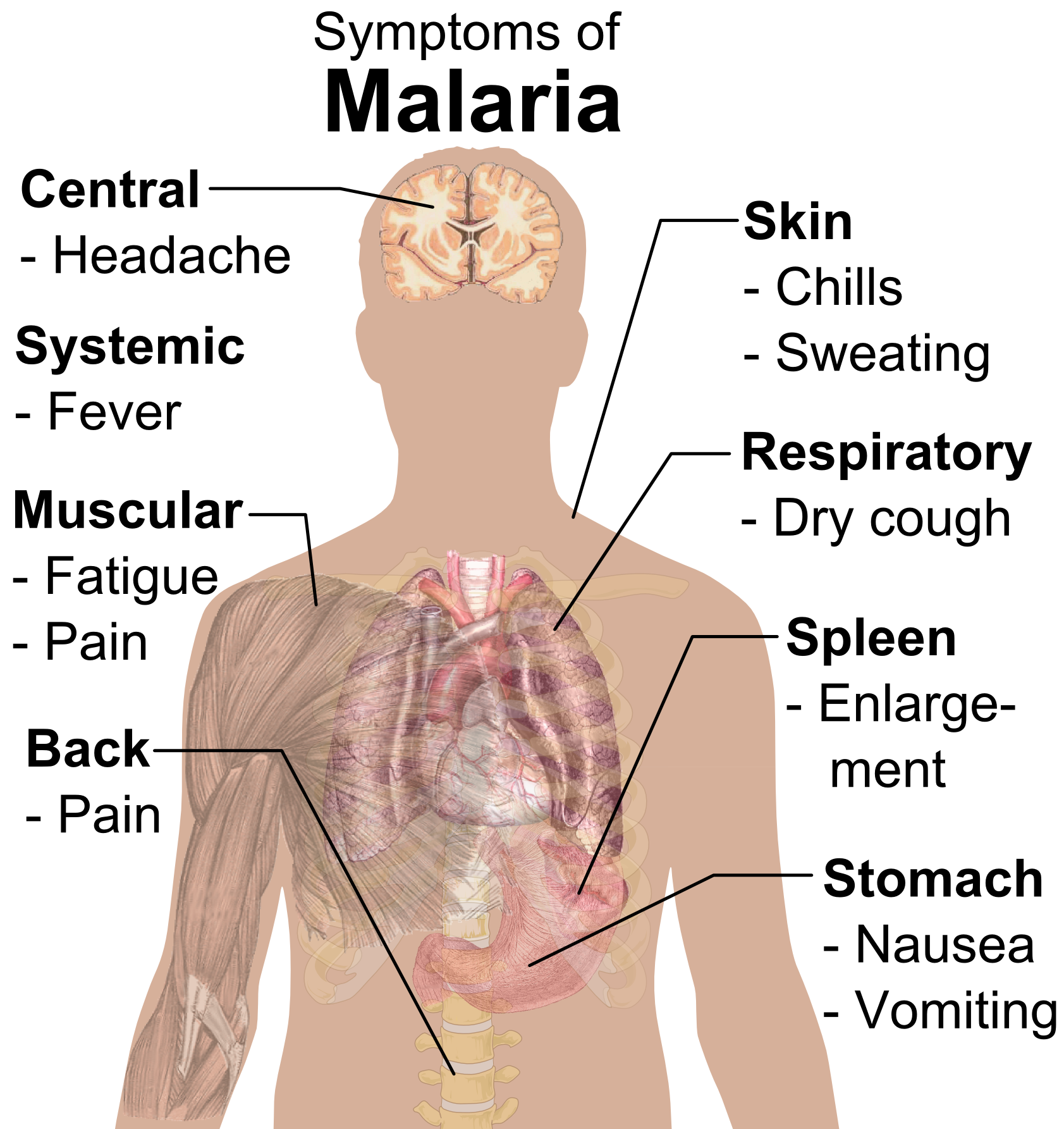
Symptoms of malaria

During his days at Public Health Research Institute, Sharma was successful in cloning the knob protein gene of Plasmodium falciparum, one of the protozoan parasites causing malaria, in 1984. At AIIMS, he led a group of researchers who carried out molecular epidemiological studies of the parasites causing malaria and their studies widened the understanding of the parasites' resistance to chloroquine and antifolate drugs. Sharma is credited with the identification of P. falciparum strains in India, isolation of P. falciparum and Plasmodium vivax, another non-cultivable protozoan parasite, as well as the development of a genomic library of Plasmodium vivax. It was his group which reported the first incidence of malaria in humans caused by Plasmodium knowlesi, a primate malarial parasite. These studies are reported to have relevance in developing immunotherapeutic reagents. Sharma 's research have been documented by way of several articles (Note: Please see Selected bibliography section) and the online repository of scientific articles of the Indian Academy of Sciences has listed a number of them. His work has been cited by many researchers and he has mentored over 70 master's and doctoral students in their studies.

== Awards and honors ==
The Council of Scientific and Industrial Research awarded Sharma the Shanti Swarup Bhatnagar Prize, one of the highest Indian science awards, in 1994. The National Academy of Sciences, India elected him as a fellow in 1993 and he received Dr. M.O.T. Iyengar Memorial Prize of the Indian Council of Medical Research for his researches on malaria in 1997. Sharma became an elected fellow of the Indian Academy of Sciences in 2000 and the Indian National Science Academy 2006; in between, he received the National Academy of Vector Borne Diseases Award in 2001. He is a life member of the Indian Society for Malaria and Other Communicable Diseases and a member of New York Academy of Sciences, American Society for Microbiology, American Association for Advancement of Science, and American Society of Tropical Medicine and Hygiene.

== Selected bibliography ==
- Mohammad Tauqeer Alam, Richa Agarwal, Yagya D. Sharma (2007). "Extensive heterozygosity at four microsatellite loci flanking Plasmodium vivax dihydrofolate reductase gene". Molecular and Biochemical Parasitology. 153 (2): 178–185. doi:10.1016/j.molbiopara.2007.03.003. PMID 17418906.
- Thakur A, Alam MT, Sharma YD (2008). "Genetic diversity in the C-terminal 42 kDa region of merozoite surface protein-1 of Plasmodium vivax (PvMSP-1(42)) among Indian isolates". Acta Trop. 108 (1): 58–63. doi:10.1016/j.actatropica.2008.08.011. PMID 18823930.
- Alam MT, Bora H, Singh N, Sharma YD (2008). "High immunogenecity and erythrocyte-binding activity in the tryptophan-rich domain (TRD) of the 74-kDa Plasmodium vivax alanine-tryptophan-rich antigen (PvATRAg74)". Vaccine. 26 (31): 3787–94. doi:10.1016/j.vaccine.2008.05.059. PMID 18579264.
- Ahmed A, Sharma YD (2008). "Ribozyme cleavage of Plasmodium falciparum gyrase A gene transcript affects the parasite growth". Parasitol Res. 103 (4): 751–63. doi:10.1007/s00436-008-1036-y. PMID 18523802. S2CID 23199947.
- Hema Bora, Manoj K Das, Anwar Ahmed, Yagya D Sharma (2009). "Variations in the Mitochondrial DNA Markers in the Anopheles (Cellia) Sundaicus Population From the Andaman and Nicobar Islands, India". Acta Trop. 112 (2): 120–124. doi:10.1016/j.actatropica.2009.07.007. PMID 19595665.

== See also ==
- Malaria prophylaxis
- Antimalarial medication
