= Maharshi Devraha Baba Medical College, Deoria =

- Other names: Autonomous State Medical College, Deoria
- Type: Medical College and Hospital
- Established: 2021; 5 years ago
- Affiliations: Atal Bihari Vajpayee Medical University
- Principal: Dr. Rajni Patel
- Location: Deoria, Uttar Pradesh, India
- Campus: Urban
- Website: http://mdbmc.in/

Maharshi Devraha Baba Medical College, Deoria, also known as Government Medical College, Deoria, is a full-fledged tertiary government Medical college and hospital. It is located at Deoria in Uttar Pradesh, India. This college is named after Maharshi Devraha Baba. The college imparts the degree of Bachelor of Medicine and Surgery (MBBS). The yearly undergraduate student intake is 100.

This college is built in periphery land of District Hospital deoria and spread on 28.18 acres of land including both college and hospital.

== Courses ==
This medical college undertakes the education and training of 100 students in MBBS courses.

== Affiliated ==
The college is affiliated with Atal Bihari Vajpayee Medical University and is recognized by the National Medical Commission.
