= Maharshi Vishwamitra Autonomous State Medical College =

- Other names: Autonomous State Medical College, Ghazipur
- Type: Medical College and Hospital
- Established: 2021; 5 years ago
- Affiliations: Atal Bihari Vajpayee Medical University
- Location: Ghazipur, Uttar Pradesh, India

Maharshi Vishwamitra Autonomous State Medical College, also known as Ghazipur Medical College, is a full-fledged tertiary government Medical college and hospital. It is located at Ghazipur in Uttar Pradesh. The college imparts the degree of Bachelor of Medicine and Surgery (MBBS). The yearly undergraduate student intake is 100.

== Courses ==
Maharshi Vishwamitra Autonomous State Medical College undertakes the education and training of 100 students in MBBS courses.

== Affiliated ==
The college is affiliated with Atal Bihari Vajpayee Medical University and is recognized by the National Medical Commission.
