= Maa Vindhyavasini Autonomous State Medical College =

Government Medical College, Mirzapur

- Other names: Government Medical College, Mirzapur
- Type: Medical College and Hospital
- Established: 2021; 5 years ago
- Affiliations: Atal Bihari Vajpayee Medical University
- Principal: Dr. Raj Bahadur Kamal
- Location: Mirzapur, Uttar Pradesh, India; 25.1801°N 82.6062°E
- Campus: Urban, 20 acres (8.1 ha); Urban
- Website: mvasmc.edu.in

Maa Vindhyavasini Autonomous State Medical College (also known as Government Medical College, Mirzapur) is a public tertiary medical school and hospital located in Mirzapur, Uttar Pradesh, India. Established in 2021, the institution is spread across a 20 acres (8.1 ha) campus and is associated with the Divisional Hospital, Mirzapur. It has an annual undergraduate intake of 100 students.

== Academics ==
The college offers the Bachelor of Medicine, Bachelor of Surgery (MBBS) undergraduate degree course. Admission is based on merit through the National Eligibility cum Entrance Test (NEET-UG). The yearly student intake is 100.

== Affiliation ==
The college is affiliated with Atal Bihari Vajpayee Medical University and is recognized by the National Medical Commission.
