= National Capital Region Institute of Medical Sciences =

Medical college in Uttar Pradesh, India

- Motto: विद्या नो रुगविमुक्तये
- Type: Private Medical College
- Established: 2018
- Academic affiliations: Atal Bihari Vajpayee Medical University
- Principal: Dr. Shelesh Kumar Goel
- Students: 750 (2018–19, 2020–21, 2021–22, 2022–23 and 2023–24 batches)
- Undergraduates: 150 per annum
- Location: Meerut, Uttar Pradesh, India; 28.8103267°N 77.7556156°E
- Campus: Rural
- Website: ncrinstituteofmedicalsciences.com

National Capital Region Institute of Medical Sciences, Meerut or N.C.R. Institute of Medical Sciences, Meerut is a private medical college run by KSD Charitable Trust, situated at Nalpur Village, Hapur–Meerut road, in Meerut district, Uttar Pradesh. It was started in 2018 when National Medical Commission gives it permission to start M.B.B.S. course. It is affiliated with Atal Bihari Vajpayee Medical University.
