= Autonomous State Medical College, Hardoi =

- Other names: Government Medical College, Hardoi
- Type: Medical College and Hospital
- Established: 2021; 5 years ago
- Affiliations: Atal Bihari Vajpayee Medical University
- Principal: Dr. Javin Bishnu Gogoi
- Location: Hardoi, Uttar Pradesh, India
- Campus: Urban
- Website: https://asmchardoi.org/

Autonomous State Medical College, Hardoi, also known as Government Medical College, Hardoi, is a full-fledged tertiary government Medical college and hospital. It is located at Hardoi in Uttar Pradesh, India. The college imparts the degree of Bachelor of Medicine and Surgery (MBBS). The yearly undergraduate student intake is 100.

This medical college is spread on 16.5 acres of land and associated to District Hospital Hardoi.

== Courses ==
This medical college undertakes the education and training of 100 students in MBBS courses.

== Affiliated ==
The college is affiliated with Atal Bihari Vajpayee Medical University and is recognized by the National Medical Commission.

== See also ==
- Atal Bihari Vajpayee Medical University
- King George's Medical University, Lucknow
- Rajarshi Dashrath Autonomous State Medical College, Ayodhya
- Autonomous State Medical College, Shahjahanpur
