= KMC Medical College & Hospital =

College in Maharajganj, India

- केएमसी मेडिकल कॉलेज एवं हॉस्पिटल
- Other name: KMC Maharajganj
- Motto: Esteemed-Ethics-Excellence
- Type: PPP (Government of Uttar Pradesh)
- Established: 2024
- Parent institution: Shanti Foundation
- Accreditation: NABH
- Affiliations: NMC, NBEMS
- Academic affiliations: Atal Bihari Vajpayee Medical University(2024 - present)
- Endowment: ₹18.5 Crore (State Govt.); ₹160 Crore (Central Govt.)
- Chairman: Vinay Kumar Shrivastava
- Dean: Dr. Sankalp Dwivedi
- Students: 676
- Undergraduates: 250 (MBBS) students every year
- Postgraduates: 76 (M.D./M.S.) residents every year
- Location: Farenda Road, Maharajganj, Uttar Pradesh, 273303, India; 27.111555°N 83.4770000°E
- Campus: 24.2 acres (9.8 ha); Suburban
- Language: English
- Beds: 1200
- Teaching hospital: KMC Digital Hospital
- Colours: Azure White
- Website: kmcmedicalcollege.com

KMC Medical College & Hospital (KMC M) is a Public-Private Partnership (PPP) model based medical college in the city of Maharajganj in the Indian state of Uttar Pradesh. It offers undergraduate courses in Bachelor of Medicine and Bachelor of Surgery (MBBS) as well as postgraduate courses in Doctor of Medicine (M.D.) and Master of Surgery (M.S.) programs. The college was established and is maintained by the Gorakhpur based Shanti Foundation.

== Administration ==
The college was established in 2024 by the Gorakhpur-based Shanti Foundation. Vinay Kumar Srivastava serves as the chairman and managing director of the college. The Dean of the college is Dr. Sankalp Dwivedi. The institution functions at the interface of the trust (Shanti Foundation) and state oversight under the PPP agreement.

A MoU was signed in 2022 between the Government of Uttar Pradesh and the Shanti Foundation for the establishment and operation of the medical college under the PPP mode. The foundation stone for Medical College was officially laid by Prime Minister Narendra Modi in June 2022 during the Uttar Pradesh Investors Summit in Lucknow. The college was formally inaugurated by Chief Minister Yogi Adityanath in 2024, marking it as the first PPP-mode medical college in the state of Uttar Pradesh.

== Affiliations and Recognition ==
The college is affiliated with Atal Bihari Vajpayee Medical University (ABVMU), Uttar Pradesh. The college is recognised by the National Medical Commission (NMC), the National Board of Examinations in Medical Sciences (NBEMS), and the hospital holds accreditation from the National Accreditation Board for Hospitals & Healthcare Providers (NABH).

Year-wise Seats Affiliated
Year	MBBS (UG)	MD/MS (PG)
2024	150	NA
2025	200	NA
2026	250	76

(MD/MS) Seats Affiliated
Department	Approved Seats
M.D. Anatomy	4
M.D. Physiology	4
M.D. Biochemistry	4
M.D. Pathology	4
M.D. Microbiology	4
M.D. Pharmacology	4
M.D. Community Medicine	4
M.D. Forensic Medicine and Toxicology	4
M.S. Otorhinolaryngology	4
M.S. Ophthalmology	4
M.D. Internal Medicine	4
M.S. General Surgery	4
M.S. Obstetrics & Gynaecology	4
M.D. Paediatrics	4
M.S. Orthopaedics	4
M.D. Anaesthesiology	4
M.D. Dermatology & Venereology	4
M.D. Psychiatry	4
M.D. Radiodiagnosis	4
M.D. Respiratory Medicine	0
M.D. Emergency Medicine	0
M.D. Radiation Oncology	0
M.D. Immunohematology	0
Total	76

== Campus ==
The college is spread over 24.2 acres and offers modern infrastructure to support medical education and student life. The campus features spacious lecture halls, departmental laboratories, and a central library with internet access and over 5,996 textbooks and reference materials. Separate hostels for male and female students are equipped with gymnasiums and facilities for indoor games, while faculty and staff have on-campus residential accommodations. Sports facilities include courts for volleyball, basketball, badminton, and football, and annual sports meets encourage student participation in both indoor and outdoor events. The affiliated 1,068-bed KMC Digital Hospital provides comprehensive healthcare services, including 24/7 emergency care, ICUs, NICUs, PICUs, and a Coronary Care Unit, offering students extensive hands-on clinical training across multiple specialties.

== State Funding ==
Under the Public Private Partnership (PPP) model of the Government of Uttar Pradesh, the college received substantial state funding to support its educational expenditures. For the academic year 2024-25, ₹8.75 crore was allocated to support the initial batch of 150 students in 2025. Subsequently, with the approval of the State Governor, the Medical Education and Training Department released an additional incentive grant of ₹9.75 crore, sanctioned for the expanded total enrollment of 350 students in 2026, combining both MBBS batches.

== Admission ==
The college admits 150 students each year into the MBBS program. Admission is strictly based on performance in the NEET-UG examination. Seat allotment and counselling are handled by the Directorate General of Medical Education (DGME), Uttar Pradesh through the state counselling process. There is no reservation of seats by community; all seats are open. The MBBS course spans 4.5 years of academic instruction followed by a one-year compulsory rotating internship.

The college operates under a Public-Private Partnership (PPP) model between the Shanti Foundation and the Government of Uttar Pradesh. Under this arrangement, the fee structure for MBBS students is regulated and fixed by the Uttar Pradesh State Government.
