= Sarai Tarin =

- locality
- Nickname: Bone City
- Country: India
- State: Uttar Pradesh
- District: Sambhal

Sarai Tarin (Hindi: सराय तरीन) (Urdu: سراۓ ترین) is a locality in Sambhal. Sarai Tarin is 4 km away from Sambhal city but is included in Sambhal.

Sarai Tarin is famous for its craft. Here Many things related to Handicraft are manufactured which are exported to many European countries. Specially Horn, Bone, wooden, and Raisin items like jewellery, photo frame, decorative items are made here. Saraitarin gave many chairman to the Tehseel Sambhal.

== See also ==
- Sambhal
- Mahatma Gandhi Memorial Post Graduate College
- Government Degree College Sambhal
