= Shyam Nagar =

Shyam Nagar East and West
- Neighbourhood
- Location in Uttar Pradesh, India
- Coordinates: 28.05°N 79.12°E
- Country: India
- State: Uttar Pradesh
- District: Budaun, Badaun district, Uttar Pradesh
- Metro: Budaun Metro Area, Uttar Pradesh

Government
  - Body: Budaun Municipal Corporation

Population (2016 (estimated))
  - Total: 41,263

Languages
  - Official: Hindi
- Time zone: UTC+5:30 (IST)
- Postal code: 243601
- Lok Sabha constituency: Aonla (Lok Sabha constituency), Uttar Pradesh
- Vidhan Sabha constituency: Shekhupur, Bareilly division, Uttar Pradesh
- Civic agency: Budaun Municipal Corporation

Shyam Nagar is an area of Budaun city in Uttar Pradesh, India.

== Location ==
It's located on the SH33 Bareilly Road at the end of the city, and Budaun Old Bypass also passes through it. The nearest bus stop is Navada Chowk, 200 m away, nearest bus stand is Aonla Bus Stand 500 m away, Budaun Roadways Bus Stand 2.5 km away and Budaun Railway Station is 3.5 km away.

== See also ==
- Budaun
