= Ada Jafri =

Pakistani poet (1924–2015)

Ada Jafarey ادؔا جعفری
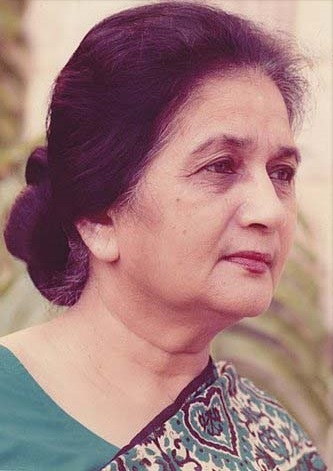
- Jafarey in 1987 (Karachi)
- Born: Aziz Jahan; 22 August 1924; Badayun, U.P., British India, (now India)
- Died: 12 March 2015 (aged 90); Karachi, Sindh, Pakistan
- Resting place: PECHS Graveyard (Society Qabristan), Jamshed Town, Karachi 24°52′0″N 67°3′18″E
- Education: Primary education in poetry (Maria)
- Occupations: Poet; author
- Spouse: Nurul Hasan Jafarey (m. 1947–1995)
- Children: Sabiha Jafarey; Azmi Jafarey; Aamir Jafarey
- Writing career
- Pen name: Ada Jafarey
- Period: 1945–2015
- Genre: Ghazal • free verse • haiku • short essay
- Subject: Feminism among others
- Notable works: Maiṉ Sāz Ḍhūṉḍtī Rahī (1950); S̲h̲ahr-i Dard (1967)
- Notable awards: Pride of Performance (2003); Medal of Excellence (1981); Adamjee Literary Award (1967)
- Movement: Modernism • post-modernism
- Website: www.adajafarey.com

Ada Jafarey (Urdu: ادؔا جعفری : Adā Jaʿfrī) (PP, TI), often spelled Ada Jafri (22 August 1924 – 12 March 2015), was a Pakistani poet who is regarded as the first major female Urdu poet to be published and has been called "The First Lady of Urdu Poetry". She was also an author and was considered a prominent figure in contemporary Urdu literature. She received awards from the Government of Pakistan, the Pakistan Writers' Guild, and literary societies of North America and Europe in recognition of her contribution to Urdu literature.

== Life ==
=== Early life ===
Ada Jafarey was born on 22 August 1924, in Badayun, U.P., British India. Her birth name was Aziz Jahan. (Note: عزیز جہاں: ʿAzīz Jahaṉ) Her father, Maulvi Badrul Hasan, (Note: مولوی بدر الحسن / ALA-LC: Badru l-Ḥasan) died when she was three, and her mother raised her. She started composing poetry when she was twelve years old, under the pen name of Ada Badayuni. She spent her early life within impassable social bounds.

=== Married life ===
She married Nurul Hasan Jafarey (Note: نور الحسن جعفری: Nūru l-Ḥasan Jaʿfrī) on 29 January 1947, in Lucknow, India. After her marriage, she took her pen name Ada Jafarey. Her husband, Nurul Hasan, was a top-ranking civil servant of the Federal Government of India. Ada Jafarey also moved with her husband to Karachi after the independence of Pakistan in 1947. Her husband was a littérateur himself who wrote columns for both English and Urdu newspapers. He also served as the president of the Anjuman-i Taraqqi-i Urdu. Nurul Hasan, a major inspiration to her writing, died on 3 December 1995.

=== Later life ===
She had been residing in Karachi, Pakistan. She used to frequently travel between Karachi and Toronto, playing an active role in promoting Urdu.

=== Family ===
Ada Jafarey and Nurul Hasan Jafarey had three children, Sabiha, Azmi and Aamir. Sabiha Jafarey is married to Zubair Iqbal and is settled in Potomac, Maryland, US. They have three children: Sabah Iqbal, Yusuf Iqbal and Sameer Iqbal. Azmi Jafarey and his wife Shua Jafarey are now settled in Andover, Massachusetts, US. They have two sons, Faaez Jafarey and Aazim Jafarey. Ada Jafarey lived with her son, Aamir Jafarey, his wife, Maha Jafarey, and their daughter Asra Jafarey in Karachi until her death. Ada Jafarey has two great-grandchildren, Sabine Rana and Rizwan Rana, children of Sabah Iqbal Rana and her husband Fawad Rana.

=== Death ===
Ada Jafarey died in the evening of 12 March 2015 in a hospital in Karachi where she was being treated, at the age of 90. The Pakistani Minister for Information, Broadcasting and National Heritage, Pervez Rashid, the Governor of Sindh, Dr. Ishratul Ebad Khan, the Pakistani Prime Minister, Mian Nawaz Sharif, Dr. Muhammad Qasim Bughio, Chairman PAL, and Zahida Parveen, Director-General PAL, expressed sorrow over the death of Jafarey. They praised her work in the field of Urdu poetry and prayed for her soul. Her funeral prayer was held in Al-Hilal Mosque, Karachi. She was buried in the PECHS graveyard, Jamshed Town, Karachi on 13 March 2015.

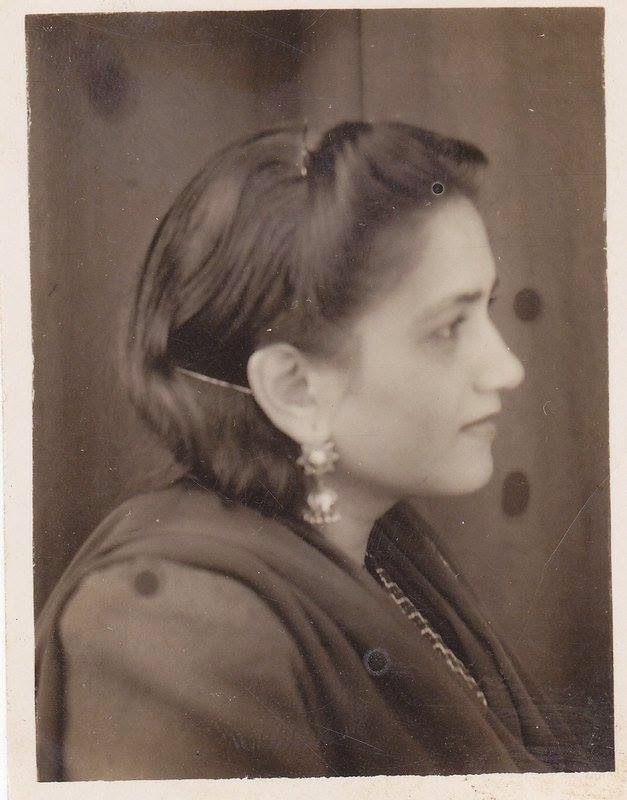
Ada Jafri in 1940

== Literary career ==
=== The first female poet ===
Ada Jafarey was part of a traditionally conservative society where women were not allowed to think and express independently. But she was bold enough to express herself. Despite having traditionality ingrained in her personality, she took part in modern art. As early as 1950, she was recognized as the First Lady of Urdu Poetry. (Note: اُردُو شاعری کی خاتونِ اوّل: Urdū S̲h̲āʿirī kī K̲h̲ātūn-i Awwal) Ada's husband, Nurul Hasan Jafarey, and her mother encouraged her to continue her literary activities in spite of social difficulties. She was the student of great poets like Akhtar Sheerani and Jafar Ali Khan Asar Lakhnavi and used to get her poetry checked and corrected by them.

=== Style ===
Ada Jafarey writes in a gender-neutral mode, though her works include feminist themes like discrimination and dehumanisation of women and of them being viewed as sexual objects. Her personality seems absent from her poetry.

Ada Jafarey wrote of her experiences as a wife and mother in a modified traditional idiom, but also noticed the lack of fulfillment that accompanied these relationships.

=== Genre ===
Ada Jafarey's works are mostly Ghazals, but she also experimented with āzād naz̤m, (Note: آزاد نظم (Urdu for 'free verse')) as well as Urdu Haiku. She had mastered both genres of Urdu poetry, naz̤m and ghazal. In her ghazals, she took the pen name, Adā. She has also written a few maẓāmīn. (Note: مضامین (Urdu for 'short essays'))

=== Works ===
Ada Jafarey's first ghazal was published in Akhtar Sheerani's magazine, Romān, (Note: رومان) in 1945. Ada Jafarey published her first collection of poems, "Maiṉ Sāz Ḍhūṉḍtī Rahī" (Note: میں ساز ڈھونڈتی رہی (Urdu for 'I kept looking for the 'musical instrument'')) in 1950. Her book, G̲h̲azal Numā, (Note: غزل نما) containing short essays with short biographies and brief commentaries on the work previous Urdu poets was published in 1987. Besides, she published five collections of Urdu poetry (S̲h̲ahr-i Dard, G̲h̲azālāṉ, Tum to Wāqif Ho!, Ḥarf-i S̲h̲anāsāʾī, Safar Bāqī, and Mausam, Mausam), (Note: شہر درد، غزالاں تم تو واقف ہو، حرف شناسائی، سفر باقی، اور موسم موسم) in addition to her autobiography ("Jo Rahī so BeK̲h̲abrī Rahī"), (Note: جو رہی سو بےخبری رہی (Urdu for 'It was just ignorance that stayed on')) and forty research papers. She also published her collection of Urdu Haiku, Sāz-i Suk̲h̲n Bahānā hai (Note: سازِ سخن بہانا ہے) Her ghazal, Hoṉṭoṉ pih kabhī un ke merā nām hī āʾe (Note: ہونٹوں پہ کبھی ان کے میرا نام ہی آئے) was sung and popularised by Ustad Amanat Ali Khan. The first couplet of that ghazal is:

ہونٹوں پہ کبھی ان کے، میرا نام ہی آئے	؎
آئے تو سہی، برسرالزام ہی آئے

Transliteration:

Hoṉṭoṉ pih kabhī un ke, merā nām hī āʾe
Āʾe to sahī, barsar-i ilzām hī āʾe

== Awards ==
In 1955, Hamdard Foundation, New Delhi recognized her as the "Outstanding Female Poet of the Century". Later, she was awarded the Adamjee Literary Award by the Pakistan Writers' Guild in 1967 for her second poetic collection, S̲h̲ahr-i Dard. (Note: شہر درد (Urdu for 'The City of Pain')) In recognition of her work, the Government of Pakistan awarded her the Medal of Excellence in 1981. She received the Baba-e Urdu, Dr. Maulvi Abdul Haq Award from the Pakistan Academy of Letters in 1994, and the Quaid-e Azam Literary Award in 1997. She was also the recipient of the Hamdard Foundation of Pakistan's Certificate of Merit. She was the recipient of various international awards from literary societies in North America and Europe.

The Government of Pakistan conferred upon her the Pride of Performance Award for Literature in 2003 (awards were announced on 14 August 2002). She was the recipient of the Kamal-e Fan Award for lifetime achievement in literature by the Pakistan Academy of Letters in 2003. She was the first woman recipient of the award since the literary prize was established by the Pakistan Academy of Letters (PAL) in 1997.

== Feminist views ==
Ada Jafarey was a supporter of feminism. She expressed her views thus: (Note: Maiṉ ne mardoṉ kī ʿāʾid kardah pābandiyoṉ ko qubūl nahīṉ kiyā, balkih un pābandiyoṉ ko qubūl kiyā jo mere ẕahn ne mujh pih ʿāʾid kī haiṉ. Maiṉ samajhtī hūṉ kih bāt ko bainu l-sutūr kahnā zyādah munāsib hai kyūṉkih ramz o-kināyah bhī to s̲h̲āʿirī kā ḥusn hai.)

میں نے مردوں کی عائد کردہ پابندیوں کو قبول نہیں کیا، بلکہ اُن پابندیوں کو قبول کیا جو میرے ذہن نے مجھ پہ عائد کی ہیں۔۔۔ میں سمجھتی ہوں کہ بات کو بین الستور کہنا زیادہ مناسب ہے کیونکہ رمز و کنایہ بھی تو شاعری کا حُسن ہے۔

I did not accept the restrictions imposed by men, rather accepted only those restrictions which my mind has imposed upon me... I think that saying things from behind a veil is more appropriate because symbolism and allusion are the beauty of poetry, too.

== Critical reputation ==
Various critics say that Jafarey's poetry is full of politeness of expression. She combines both old and new thoughts in a unique artistic way through her poetry.

Qazi Abdul Ghaffar, in his introduction to Ada Jafarey's collection of verses, particularly mentioned her name in the field of feminist way of expression.

The Urdu poet and critic, Jazib Qureshi, said:
"Ada Jafarey is the first and only lady poet who carries in her poetry the eternal colours of Ghalib, Iqbal, and Jigar."

== See also ==
- Ghazal
- Fehmida Riaz
- Kishwar Naheed
- Parveen Shakir
