= Alhaj Shamim Uddin =

Pakistani politician (1931–2021)

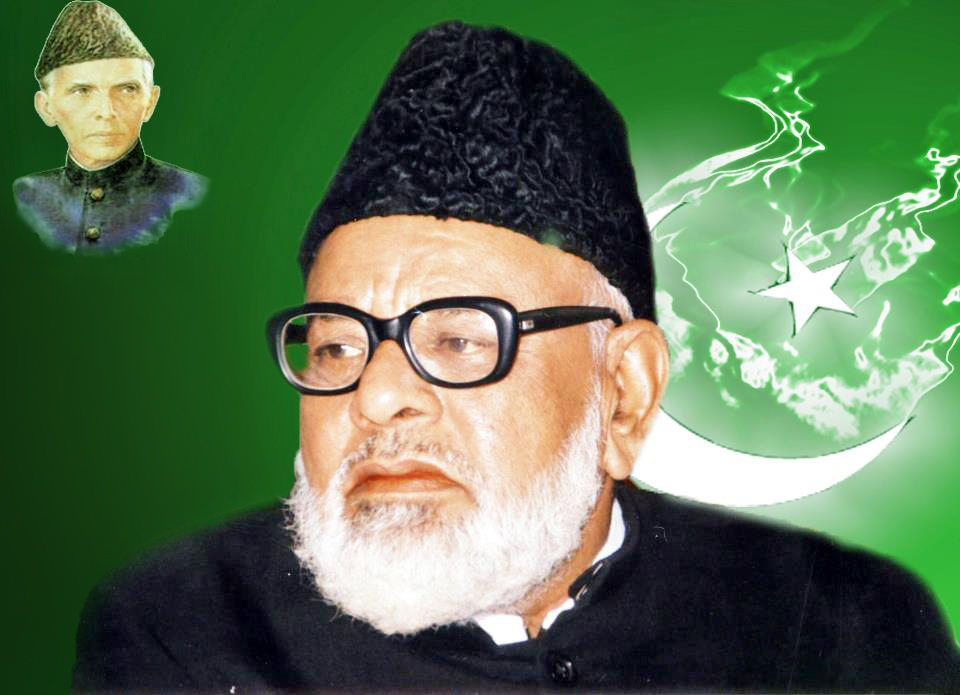
- Born: 17 March 1931; Badayun, India
- Died: 23 March 2021 (aged 90); Karachi, Pakistan
- Occupations: Politician, social worker
- Political party: Pakistan Muslim League

Alhaj Shamim Uddin (17 March 1931 – 23 March 2021) was a senior politician of Pakistan. He migrated from Badaun, India to Karachi, Pakistan on 7 May 1950 with over 40 families. He has been associated with social causes, politics and public welfare. He died on 23 March 2021 in Karachi on Pakistan Day.

== Career ==
=== Early career ===
- Served as a draftsman with Municipal Board Moradabad (U.P.) (1948 to 1950)
- Served as a computer draftsman with Pakistan P.W.D. (Central E/M Division) in Karachi, Pakistan (1950 to 1953)
- Served as a senior Draftsman with Pakistan Burma-Shell in Karachi (1953 to 1967)
- Served as a Chief Draftsman with Dawood Petroleum Ltd. Karachi (1967 to 1970)
- Served as a Draftsman-in-Charge with Investment Advisory Centre of Pakistan in Karachi (1970 to 1973)
- Served as a Marketing Officer with Badaruddin Paints Works (1973 to 1975)

=== Major positions held ===
- Ex Member and Chairman of Basic Democracy (1960 to 1968)
- Ex Councilor of KMC (during the mayorship of Abdul Sattar Afghani)
- Ex Member of Provincial Council of Sindh nominated by Governor of Sindh Gen. Abbasi who was the Chairman of the Council
- Ex Member of Provincial Assembly of Sindh (during the Speakership of Muzaffar Hussain Shah)
- Ex Minister of Religious affairs, Zakat and Auqaf, Labor and Social welfare.
- Ex Acting Chief Minister of Sindh in 1987
- Ex Member of Highly Official Committee constituted after the death of President Zia-ul-Haq (during the presidency of Ghulam Ishaq Khan)

Chief Election Agent

Alhaj Shamim Uddin was appointed the chief election agent for Maulauna Shafi Okaarvi and Zahoor ul Hasan Bhopali who were the candidates of Pakistan National Alliance- PNA for National and Provincial Assembly respectively in 1970. He was responsible to look after the election process and supervised the polling agents for these two candidates.

=== Organizational affiliations ===
Civil Defense Organization

Civil Defense Organization was formed with the purpose to reduce to the minimum the number of casualties in the people, to minimise damage and dislocation of essential services, to ensure uninterrupted production in mills and factories, to provide active civilian support to war efforts, and to maintain in the people a high standard of morale and a strong "will to win". Alhaj Shamim Uddin had successfully undergone the civil defence training in 1965. Being a post warden in 1965 war, he fulfilled his duty in educating the people regarding the defensive techniques and safety precautions in war conditions.

Pakistan Islamic Forum

Alhaj Shamim Uddin founded this non political organisation with the intention to revive Islamic spirit in all sects. Pakistan Islamic Forum consists of a Founder chairman, one central President and general secretary with other office bearers. It also has power structure on town levels, Union Council Level with office bearers, general members and workers. This organisation organizes various Islamic conferences and seminars aiming to unite the Muslims to serve together for a common purpose. He was the founder and chairman of this organisation. Pakistan Islamic Forum celebrates birth anniversary of Muhammad by organising Islamic conferences since 1995. This conference assembles Aalims and scholars from Islamic sects on one platform which largely contributes to rejuvenate the core teachings of Muhammad.

Pakistan Muslim League

- Ex Secretary of Library, City Muslim League in 1957
- Member of organising committee of Karachi Division (during the presidency of Commodore Khalid Jamil)
- General Secretary of Sindh (during the presidency of M. Khan Junejo)
- Vice-President of Sindh (during the presidency of Mian Nawaz Sharif)
- Central Senior Vice-President (during the presidency of Pir Sahab Pagarah)
- Islamic Democratic Alliance (known as IJI) 1986 to 1990 – President of Sindh
- Combined Opposition of Sindh (COP) in 1989 – Coordinator
- Sindh Democratic Alliance (SDA) 2002 to 2004 – general secretary
- United Muslim League – Senior Vice-President of Sindh (during the presidency of Choudry Shujat Hussain)
- Pakistan Muslim League (Q) in 2009 – President of Senior Muslim Leaguers Advisory Council of Sindh

== Religious roles ==
Dating back to 1970s when Jamiat Ulema-e-Pakistan held the recognition as one of the exalted political parties, the local residents and supporters of Alhaj Shamim Uddin encouraged him to become a part of JUP to boost it further. Leaders and religious figures at that time uplifted the incentives of Pakistan movement and Pakistan Muslim League.

Alhaj Shamim Uddin was the President of Karachi, Information Secretary of Sindh and member of central working committee (during the presidency of Maulana Shah Ahmed Noorani). He was affiliated with JUP from 1970 to 1978.

Alhaj Shamim Uddin became Naaib Nazim and Information Secretary of Jamaat Ahle Sunnat. He worked for the party from 1972 to 1979.

He has also held the following positions:

- Chairman of District Zakat committee, Karachi West
- Member of Provincial Zakat Council & Organizer of two Zakat conventions of Sindh. (Presided by President Gen. Zia ul Haq)
- Chairman of District West Hajj Committee Karachi.
- Coordinator to Governor for district Salat Committee, Karachi West.
- Isthkaam-E-Pakistan Council – 1978 to 1984 - President Karachi Division

== Written works ==
=== Journalism ===
- Columnist – Monthly Magazine, Petroleum Workers, Karachi
- Columnist – Weekly Magazine, Manadi, Karachi
- Columnist – Weekly Magazine, Akhlaaq, Karachi
- Publisher – Monthly Magazine, Tarjumaan Ahle Sunnat, Karachi
- Proprietor and publisher: Quarterly Magazine "Mujalla Badayun", Karachi

=== Compilations ===
Following books are compiled by Alhaj Shamim Uddin:

- Zakat Directory of Karachi Central and West
- Kalamdaan-e- Risaalat
- Shifa aur Rehmat
- Khuwaab aur Taabirein
- Ziarat Qaboor

=== Autobiography ===
Alhaj Shamim Uddin wrote his biography and compiled in the book known as 'YAADON KE DIYE'. His memoir is based on two volumes, covering the experiences from 1950 to 2008.

Yaadon ke Diye (From 1950 to 2008) in 2 volumes:

- Part 1 – from migration to ministership
- Part 2 – from ministership to 2008
