= Mahatma Vidur Government Medical College Bijnor =

Mahatma Vidur Autonomous State Medical College
- Motto: Sabka sath sabka vikas
- Motto in English: Health To All
- Type: Medical College
- Established: 2024; 2 years ago
- Academic affiliations: Atal Bihari Vajpayee Medical University, NMC
- Principal: Dr. Tuhin Vashishth
- Undergraduates: 100 per year
- Location: Swahedi, Najibabad Road, District- Bijnor, Uttar Pradesh, India-246701, Bijnor, Uttar Pradesh, India; 29.460444°N 78.195052°E
- Campus: Rural
- Nickname: MVASMC Bijnor
- India Uttar Pradesh

Mahatma Vidur Autonomous State Medical College Bijnor (MVASMC) is a medical college in Bijnor, western Uttar Pradesh, India. It provides subsidized health care to the surrounding rural areas of Bijnor district near National Highway 34.
