= Bekhud Badayuni =

- Born: Muhammad Abdul-Hayy Siddiqui; 17 September 1857; Badayun, North-Western Provinces, British India
- Died: 10 November 1912 (aged 55); Badayun, United Provinces, British India
- Occupations: Poet, lawyer
- Writing career
- Pen name: Bekhud Badayuni
- Period: Post-Mughal-era
- Genres: Ghazal, Hamd, Na`at, Ruba'i
- Subjects: Love, philosophy, mysticism, Islam

Muhammad Abdul-Hayy Siddiqui (1857–1912), writing under the pen-name Bekhud Badayuni, was one of the leading Urdu poets of the late nineteenth and early twentieth centuries in India. It is customary for Urdu poets to assume a pen-name (takhallus) that can be employed as a pun in the final couplet of every ghazal, often combined with a second name that denotes the poet's place of origin. In this case, "Bekhud", the pen-name means beside oneself (with joy or grief), out of one's mind; in ecstasy, transported, enraptured, intoxicated; senseless, delirious, commonly used in the context of spiritual ecstasy, and is paired with "Badayuni", which indicates ties to the city of Badayun.

== History ==
Bekhud Badayuni's most recent biographer was Asad Ahmad of Aligarh Muslim University's Urdu Department, who drew upon the work of prior biographers, including Hasrat Mohani.

Bekhud Badayuni was born on 17 September 1857 into Badayun's prominent Siddiqui family, known for its leadership in the areas of Islamic scholarship, mysticism (tasawwuf or "Sufism"), and literary pursuits. He was a descendant of the first Caliph, Abu Bakr; an intermediate ancestor, Hameeduddin Mukhlis, immigrated to Delhi from Iran in the late 13th century during the reign of Sultan Ghiyasuddin Balban, and was the brother of Shaikh Saadi Shirazi, one of the seminal and most-quoted poets of Persian literature. Balban appointed Hameeduddin qadi-ul-quddat (literally "judge-of-judges", or Chief Justice) and granted him an extensive landholding in Badayun, at the time one of the key cities of the Delhi Sultanate. It is also reported that Hameeduddin presented Saadi's two major works, Golistan and Bostan, as a gift to Prince Muhammad Shaheed (Balban's favorite son, and patron - along with Balban - of the great poet, musician, and mystic Amir Khusro).

== Life ==
Bekhud trained and qualified as a lawyer, and spent time practicing law in Muradabad and Shahjahanpur. Tiring of the practice of law, he eventually entered into government service, serving as a high official first in the princely state of Sirohi (in Rajasthan), then in the princely state of Jodhpur, where he spent the remainder of his days. He died in 1912 in Badayun.

== Influences ==
Bekhud initially entered the tutelage of Maulana Altaf Hussain Hali, Ghalib's most renowned protégé; it was under Hali's guidance that Bekhud chose his pen-name. Around 1879, concurrent with the publication of Hali's Musaddas-e-Hali (considered the beginning of the modern age of Urdu poetry) and Hali's shift in focus away from traditional forms and subjects of poetry, Bekhud left Hali and became the disciple of Nawab Mirza Khan Daagh Dehlvi, the last of the great poets of the erstwhile Mughal court. Upon Daagh's death, many of his numerous disciples clamored for the honor of being his jaa-nasheen (successor to his title and reputation as the greatest living Urdu poet); in his own memoirs, Bekhud reproaches many of Daagh's disciples for the manner in which they squabbled, and himself chose to remain aloof from the debate. Despite Bekhud's own reticence, Dr. Asad Ahmad quotes a well-known anecdote relating that Daagh, when asked to name his jaa-nasheen, replied, "Bekhud-ain [the two Bekhuds]", referring to Bekhud Badayuni and Bekhud Dehlvi (a fellow student of Daagh).

== Poetry ==
Much of Bekhud's poetry has fallen out of contemporary discourse, for a variety of reasons. In part, this circumstance is due to Bekhud's own reticence and limited publication of his works. He did not publish his collection of poetry (diwan) until 1910 (two years before his death) despite having compiled the bulk of it as early as fifteen years prior. Biographers and critics have speculated that even this late publication of Bekhud's work occurred primarily to combat the plagiarism and misappropriation of his poetic works by other poets (since, short of publication, oral transmission is the primary medium for Urdu poetry). Bekhud's residence in Jodhpur, isolated from the main centers of Urdu literature in Delhi and Lucknow, also limited the circulation of his work and provided the opportunity for some of Bekhud's contemporaries in the centers of literature to pass his work off as their own. For this reason, much of his work has grown unfamiliar to the current generation of Urdu speakers, despite having been integral to any serious poet's or critic's study of Urdu poetry until late into the 20th century. At the same time, several of his works have been mis-attributed to Bekhud Dehlvi or other poets of his time.

== Published works ==
Hosh-o-Khirad ki Dukaan (The Shop of Sense and Wisdom) (1889) (هوش و خرد کی دکان)

Sabr-o-Shakeeb ki Loot (The Plundering of Patience and Forbearance) (1889) (صبر و شکيب کی لوٿ)

Marraat-ul-Khayaal (The Mirror of Thoughts) (1910) (مراﺓ الخيال)

Afsaanah-e-Bekhud (The Tale of Bekhud) (date unknown) (افسانه بےخود)

== See also ==
- Urdu poetry
- List of Urdu language poets
