= Usehat =

- Town
- Location in Uttar Pradesh, India
- Coordinates: 27.82°N 79.25°E
- Country: India
- State: Uttar Pradesh
- District: Badaun
- Elevation: 152 m (499 ft)

Population (2001)
  - Total: 12,183

Languages
  - Official: Hindi
- Time zone: UTC+5:30 (IST)

Usehat is a town and a nagar panchayat in Badaun district in the Indian state of Uttar Pradesh. It is a town in usawan block.

== Geography ==
Usehat is located at 27.82°N 79.25°E. It has an average elevation of 152 metres (498 feet).

== Demographics ==
As of 2001 India census, Usehat had a population of 12,183. Males constitute 53% of the population and females 47%. Usehat has an average literacy rate of 32%, lower than the national average of 59.5%: male literacy is 39%, and female literacy is 23%. In Usehat, 23% of the population is under 6 years of age.
