= Budaun Fort =

The Badaun Fort is a fort in the ancient city of Badaun which was built by Ashoka The Great when he visited the region around 240 BCE and named it BudhhMau. The Historian Roz Khan Lodhi says that it was the first settlement of the modern existing city of Badaun.
