= Fani Badayuni =

Indian writer

- Born: Shaukat Ali Khan; 1879; Badaun, North-Western Provinces, British India
- Died: 27 August 1961 (aged 81–82); Hyderabad, Andhra Pradesh, India
- Education: Aligarh Muslim University
- Occupations: Urdu poet, lawyer
- Writing career
- Genres: Ghazal, Nazm

Shaukat Ali Khan (1879 – 27 August 1961), better known as Fani Badayuni (his takhallus), was an Indian Urdu poet.

== Early life and education ==
He was schooled at Government High School and graduated from Bareilly College in 1901, studied law at Aligarh Muslim University, earning L.L.B. degree in 1906.

== Career ==
Badayuni started composing poetry around Eleven years of age.

=== In Hyderabad ===
Fani migrated to Hyderabad, India after the Nizam's diwan Maharaja Kishan Prasad 'Shad', an Urdu lover and poet, got Fani appointed in the department of education.

== Bibliography ==
His first collection of poems was published in 1917 from Badaun by Naqib Press. His other published works are:

- Baqiyat-e-Fani (1926) published by Maktab-e-Agra
- Irfaniyat-e-Fani (1938) published by Anjuman Taraqqi Urdu
- Fani ki nadir tahriren: Havashi, tasrihat aur tanqidi ja'ize ke sath by Shaukat Ali Khan Fani Badayuni (1968)
- Intikhab-i Fani (Silsilah-yi matbu°at) by Shaukat °Ali Khan Fani Badayuni
- Irfaniyat-i-Fani: Ya'ni Janab Shaukat Ali Khan Sahib Fani Badayuni ke qadim-o-jadid kalam ka mukammal majmu'ah (Silsilah-e-Anjuman-e
- Taraqqi Urdu) by Shaukat Ali Khan Fani Badayuni (1939)
- Kulliyat-i Fani (Silsilah-e-matbu'at) by Shaukat Ali Khan Fani Badayuni (1992)

== See also ==
- List of Indian Urdu poets
- List of Indian poets
