= Veerangana Avanti Bai Lodhi Autonomous State Medical College, Etah =

Medical college and hospital in Etah, Uttar Pradesh, India

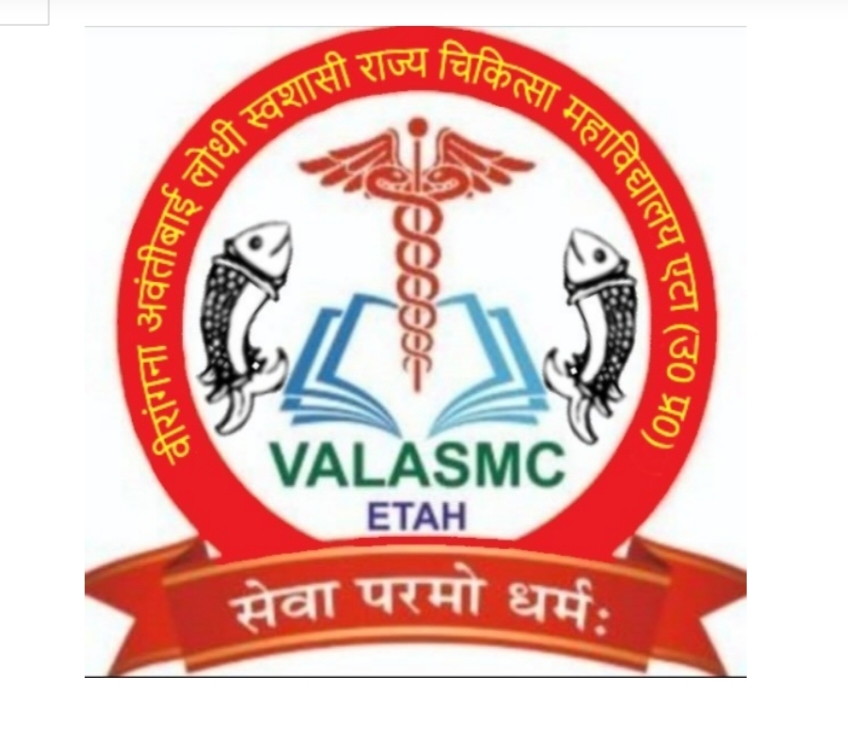
- Other names: Government Medical College, Etah
- Motto: सेवा परमो धर्म:
- Motto in English: Sewā Parmō Dhārmā
- Type: Medical College and Hospital
- Established: 2021; 5 years ago
- Affiliations: Atal Bihari Vajpayee Medical University
- Principal: Dr. Balvir Singh
- Location: Marehra Rd, Siraon, Etah,, Uttar Pradesh, 207001, India
- Campus: 25.92 acres; Rural
- Website: https://valasmcetah.edu.in/

Veerangana Avanti Bai Lodhi Autonomous State Medical College, Etah, also known as Government Medical College, Etah, is a full-fledged tertiary government medical college and hospital. It is located at Etah in Uttar Pradesh, India. The college got NMC approval in October 2021 under Principal Prof Rajesh Gupta and was formally inaugurated by Hon Prime minister Narendra Modi virtually on 25 October 2021. The college imparts the degree of Bachelor of Medicine and Surgery (MBBS). The yearly undergraduate student intake is 100.

== Courses ==
Autonomous State Medical College, Etah undertakes the education and training of 100 students in MBBS courses. Post Graduation Course offered 2 seats DNB/DGO.

== Affiliated ==
The college is affiliated with Atal Bihari Vajpayee Medical University and is recognized by the National Medical Commission.

== Campus and Buildings ==
Total Area: The campus covers approximately 25.92 acres, with around 16.44 acres allocated for the academic and administrative buildings, and 9.45 acres for the associated hospital.

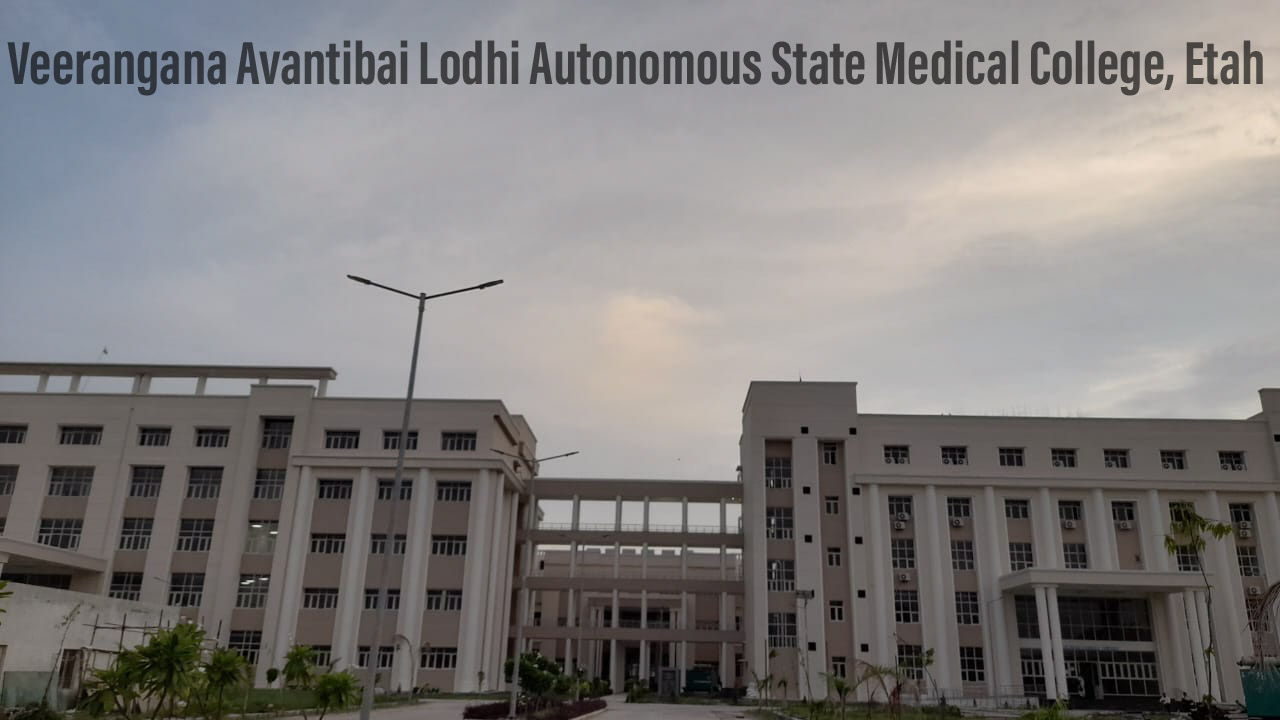
Campus and Building

Academic Buildings: Modern multi-storey blocks with smart classrooms, fully air-conditioned lecture halls, digital projectors, and advanced laboratories.

"'Administration Buildings:"' Located at the main entrance, it includes offices for the principal, administration, and faculty, along with meeting halls and seminar rooms.

== Library, Labs, and Classrooms ==
Central Library: Spacious and well-stocked with medical textbooks, reference materials, journals, and e-resources. It also includes dedicated reading areas for students.

Laboratories: Fully equipped pre-clinical and para-clinical labs including Anatomy, Physiology, Biochemistry, Pathology, Microbiology, Pharmacology, and Forensic Medicine.

Skill Labs: Modern simulation labs with mannequins and high-tech equipment to train students in emergency procedures and clinical skills.

== Hospital and Clinical Facilities ==
Attached Hospital: A 300+ bed district hospital functions as the teaching hospital for the college. It includes:

Outpatient Departments (OPDs)

Inpatient wards

Emergency services

Operation theatres

Labour room and Pediatric ward

Radiology & Diagnostics: Equipped with Digital X-ray, Ultrasound, and CT Scan machines.

Pathology Services: Advanced machines for LFT/KFT, thyroid function tests, and other diagnostics help reduce patient wait times.

OPD Expansion: Additional OPD rooms and multiple registration and pharmacy counters have been added to handle increasing patient flow.

== Delirium ==
This is the annual fest of the college.
