= Rajarshi Dashrath Autonomous State Medical College, Ayodhya =

Medical College in Ayodhya, Uttar Pradesh

- Type: Medical College and Hospital
- Established: 2019; 7 years ago
- Affiliations: Atal Bihari Vajpayee Medical University
- Principal: Dr. Dinesh Singh Martolia
- Location: Darshan Nagar, Ayodhya district, Uttar Pradesh, India
- Campus: Urban
- Website: https://www.asmcayodhya.ac.in/

Rajarshi Dashrath Autonomous State Medical College, Ayodhya, also known as Ayodhya Medical College, is a full-fledged government Medical college and hospital. It is located at Darshan Nagar, Ayodhya district of Uttar Pradesh. The college imparts the degree of Bachelor of Medicine and Surgery (MBBS). The yearly undergraduate student intake is 100.

== Courses ==
Rajarshi Dashrath Autonomous State Medical College, Ayodhya undertakes the education and training of 100 students in MBBS courses.

The medical college is spread over 17 acres of land. The teaching hospital associated with the college is Rajarshi Dashrath Autonomous State Medical College Hospital, Darshan-nagar. The hospital campus itself spans over 10 acre and has 2 ward blocks with a separate trauma Centre and burns unit.

== Affiliated ==
The college is affiliated with Atal Bihari Vajpayee Medical University and is recognized by the National Medical Commission.

== Campus ==
The college has 2 campuses, a residential and academic campus and a hospital campus. The residential campus has the Administrative block, the Lecture theatre block and the Academic block. The central ground of the campus is popularly called the kings landing. For most of the cultural activities the residential camus provides a well equipped and furnished Auditorium in the MPH (Multi Purpose Hall) complex. The MPH also has indoor games complex and the college gym. Separate hostels are available for inters, 1st year students and 2nd to 4th year students. JR and SR are provided hostel types A2.
