= Umanath Singh Autonomous State Medical College, Jaunpur =

Medical college in Uttar Pradesh, India

Coordinates: 25.8087°N 82.6884°E

Umanath Singh Autonomous State Medical College
- Type: Medical college
- Established: 2014; 12 years ago
- Affiliations: Atal Bihari Vajpayee Medical University, NMC
- Principal: Dr. R. B. Kamal
- Location: Jaunpur, Uttar Pradesh, India
- Website: asmcjaunpur.edu.in

Umanath Singh Autonomous State Medical College (formerly Government Medical College, Janupur) is a state medical college located near Jaunpur in Jaunpur district, Uttar Pradesh, India. It is situated in Karanjakala block of Jaunpur district which is on Shahganj Road, connecting Jaunpur to Shahganj. The foundation stone was laid on 24 September 2014.

== History ==
The foundation stone of the Government Medical College, in Jaunpur was laid by Akhilesh Yadav, a former chief-minister of Uttar Pradesh, on 25 September 2014.

In September 2019, the Government of Uttar Pradesh had decided to form an autonomous society that could run the college. In July 2021, Yogi Adityanath announced the name of college to be changed to Umanath Singh Medical College.
