= Darshan Nagar =

Town in Ayodhya district, India

Coordinates: 26.756082°N 82.207025°E

- Town
- Location in Uttar Pradesh, India
- Country: India
- State: Uttar Pradesh
- District: Ayodhya district

Government
  - Type: Town

Languages
  - Official: Hindi
  - Additional official: Urdu
- Time zone: UTC+5:30 (IST)
- Vehicle registration: UP 42

Darshan Nagar is a town in the Ayodhya district, Uttar Pradesh state in India. Darshan Nagar town is 5 kilometres (3.1 mi) south of the city of Ayodhya.
