= Zamir Ali Badayuni =

Indian-Pakistani literary critic and broadcaster

- Born: 20 June 1941; Badayun, Uttar Pradesh, India
- Died: 20 October 2003 (aged 62); Karachi, Sindh, Pakistan

Zamir Ali Badayuni (sometimes spelled Badayooni or Badaiyuni; 20 June 1941 – 20 October 2003) was a Pakistani critic and broadcaster on the Karachi literary scene. He worked at the Pakistan Broadcasting Corporation with Saleem Ahmed and Qamar Jameel. Badayuni wrote two books: the first, Jadeediyet aur mabaad jadeediyet, focused on modern philosophy and literary criticism and won the Baba-e-Urdu Award from the Pakistan Academy of Letters; and the second, Ma bad jadeediyet ka doosra rukh, focused on postmodernism and won the Abdul Haq Award from Adbiat Pakistan.

Badayuni was born 20 June 1941 in Badayun, UP, India, the son of Yaqoob Ali, and received his early education in Bombay before migrating to Pakistan. He died in Karachi on 20 October 2003.
