= Asar Lakhnavi =

Urdu poet, great critic, scholar, writer, translator

- Born: Mirza Jafar Ali Khan; 12 July 1885; Katra Abu Tarab, Lucknow, United Provinces (now in Uttar Pradesh, India)
- Died: 6 June 1967 (aged 81); Lucknow, Uttar Pradesh, India
- Other name: (pen name) Asar
- Education: B.A., Canning College, Lucknow (1906)
- Occupations: Urdu poet, critic, scholar, writer, translator, civil servant
- Known for: Ghazals and nazms in Urdu; critical essays and scholarly works
- Notable work: Chhan Been (collection of essays), Anees Ki Marsiya Nigari, Farhang-e-Asar, Mutala-e-Ghalib
- Awards: Padma Bhushan

Mirza Jafar Ali Khan (12 July 1885 – 6 June 1967), better known as Asar Lakhnavi, was an Urdu poet, civil servant, critic, scholar, writer, translator who belonged from Lucknow, Uttar Pradesh. He wrote Urdu ghazals and nazms under the pen name (takhallus) "Asar".

== Biography ==
=== Early life and education ===
Asar Lakhnavi was born on 12 July 1885, in the neighborhood of Katra Abu Tarab in Lucknow. His ancestor, Hakim Muhammad Shafi, a physician, came to Akbarabad from Isfahan. After staying for a while, Shafi moved to Faizabad and served as a physician in the court of Nawab Shuja-ud-Daula. Lakhnavi birth name was Mirza Jafar Ali Khan. He completed his early education at home. After passing the entrance examination in 1902, he got admission in Canning College Lucknow and he received his B.A. degree from Canning College in 1906.

=== Career ===
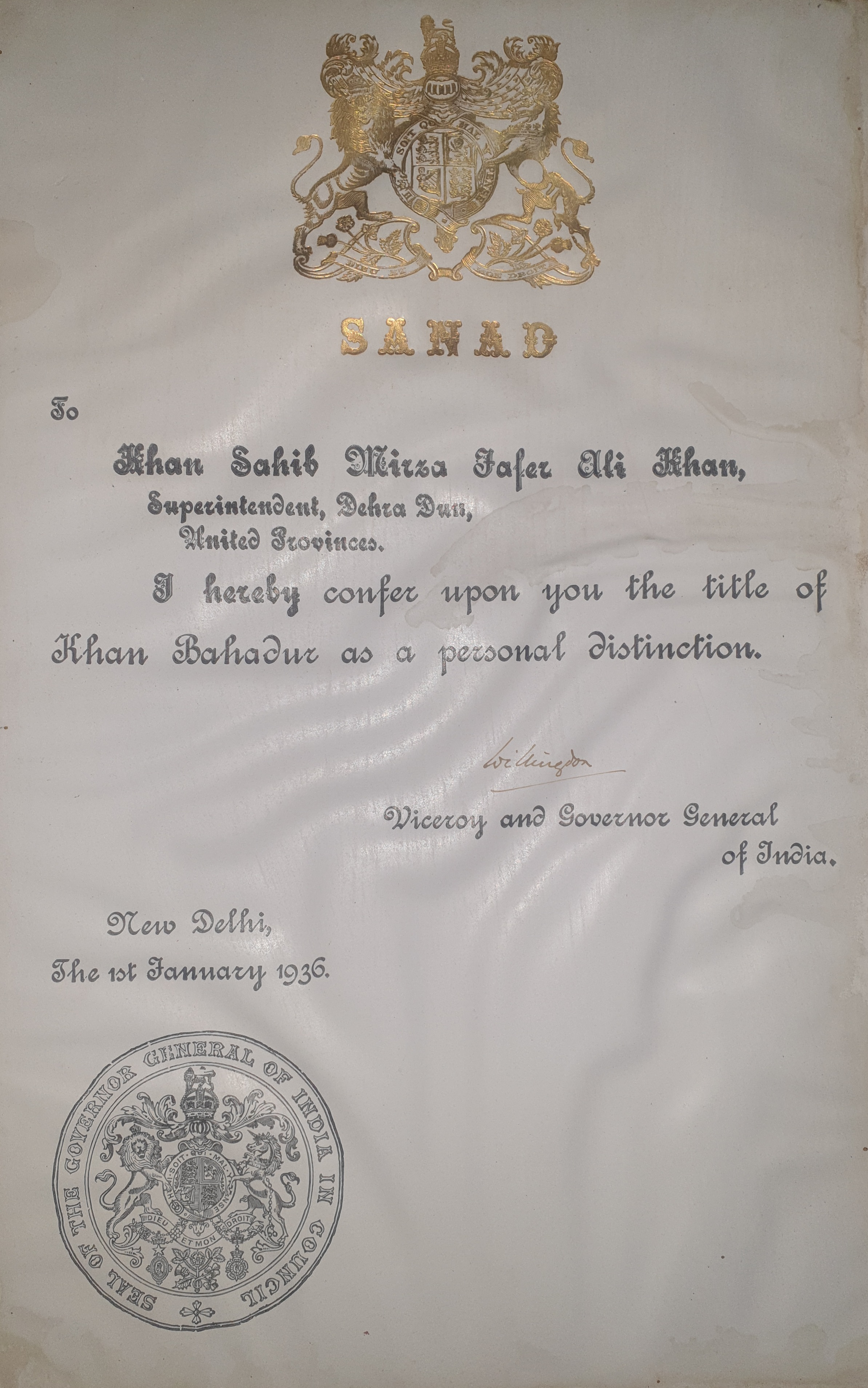
certificate of title Khan Bahadur

In 1909, he was appointed deputy collector in the United Provinces served till 1935 and after that he was promoted as collector from 1937 to 1940. Lakhnavi worked on many important government positions including deputy collector. He retired in 1940 from civil service. After the retirement, he held the posts of Home Minister and Education Minister of the state of Jammu and Kashmir. He was given the title of Khan Bahadur by Freeman Freeman-Thomas, 1st Marquess of Willingdon, viceroy and governor general of India in January 1936. In 1962, he was awarded Padma Bhushan (third-highest civilian award of the Republic of India) by Government of India. for his literary works including the poetic translation of Bhagwat Gita. According to Malik Ram, Asar also served as minister for revenue and later on as prime minister in the State of Kashmir for quite some time.

He was felicitated by Uttar Pradesh government with Ghalib award for his Urdu dictionary Farhang e Asar.

== Writings ==
He wrote several books in Urdu language.

He has three Diwans of Ghazals in his name

1.Asaristan

2.Baharan

3.Nau Baharan

In Urdu criticism, his collection of essays 'Chhan been', 'Anees Ki Marsiya Nigari', 'Farhang - e - Asar' and 'Mutala e Ghalib'.

- Lakhnavi, Mirza Jafar Ali Khan Asar. Asar ke tanqidi mazamin (in Urdu). Nizami Pres Buk Ijansi.
- Lakhnavi, Asar (22 December 2024). Intekhaab-e-Kalaam Asar Lakhnavi: (Urdu Poetry Collection) (in Urdu). Taemeer Publications. ISBN 978-93-6908-660-3.

== Death ==
He died on 6 June 1967 in Lucknow at the age of 81.
