= Dr. Sone Lal Patel Autonomous State Medical College, Pratapgarh =

Medical college and hospital

- Other names: Government Medical College, Pratapgarh
- Type: Medical College and Hospital
- Established: 2021; 5 years ago
- Affiliations: Atal Bihari Vajpayee Medical University
- Location: Pratapgarh, Uttar Pradesh, 230001, India
- Campus: Rural
- Website: https://asmcpratapgarh.org.in/

Dr. Sone Lal Patel Autonomous State Medical College, Pratapgarh, also known as Government Medical College, Pratapgarh, is a full-fledged tertiary government Medical college and hospital. It is located at Pratapgarh in Uttar Pradesh, India. The college imparts the degree of Bachelor of Medicine and Surgery (MBBS). The yearly undergraduate student intake is 100. It spread over campus area of around 11.5 acres and associated with District Hospital Pratapgarh.

== Courses ==
This medical college undertakes the education and training of 100 students in MBBS courses.

== Affiliated ==
The college is affiliated with Atal Bihari Vajpayee Medical University and is recognized by the National Medical Commission.
