= Autonomous State Medical College, Firozabad =

- Other names: Government Medical College, Firozabad
- Type: Medical College and Hospital
- Established: 2019; 7 years ago
- Affiliations: Atal Bihari Vajpayee Medical University
- Principal: Dr. Yogesh Kumar Goyal
- Location: Firozabad, Uttar Pradesh, India
- Campus: Urban
- Website: https://www.asmcfirozabad.edu.in/

Autonomous State Medical College, Firozabad, also known as Government Medical College, Firozabad, is a full-fledged tertiary government Medical college and hospital. It is located at Firozabad in Uttar Pradesh. The college imparts the degree of Bachelor of Medicine and Surgery (MBBS). The yearly undergraduate student intake is 100.

== Courses ==
Autonomous State Medical College, Firozabad undertakes the education and training of 100 students in MBBS courses.

== Affiliated ==
The college is affiliated with Atal Bihari Vajpayee Medical University and is recognized by the National Medical Commission.
