= Sirsi, Raebareli =

Sirsi
- Village
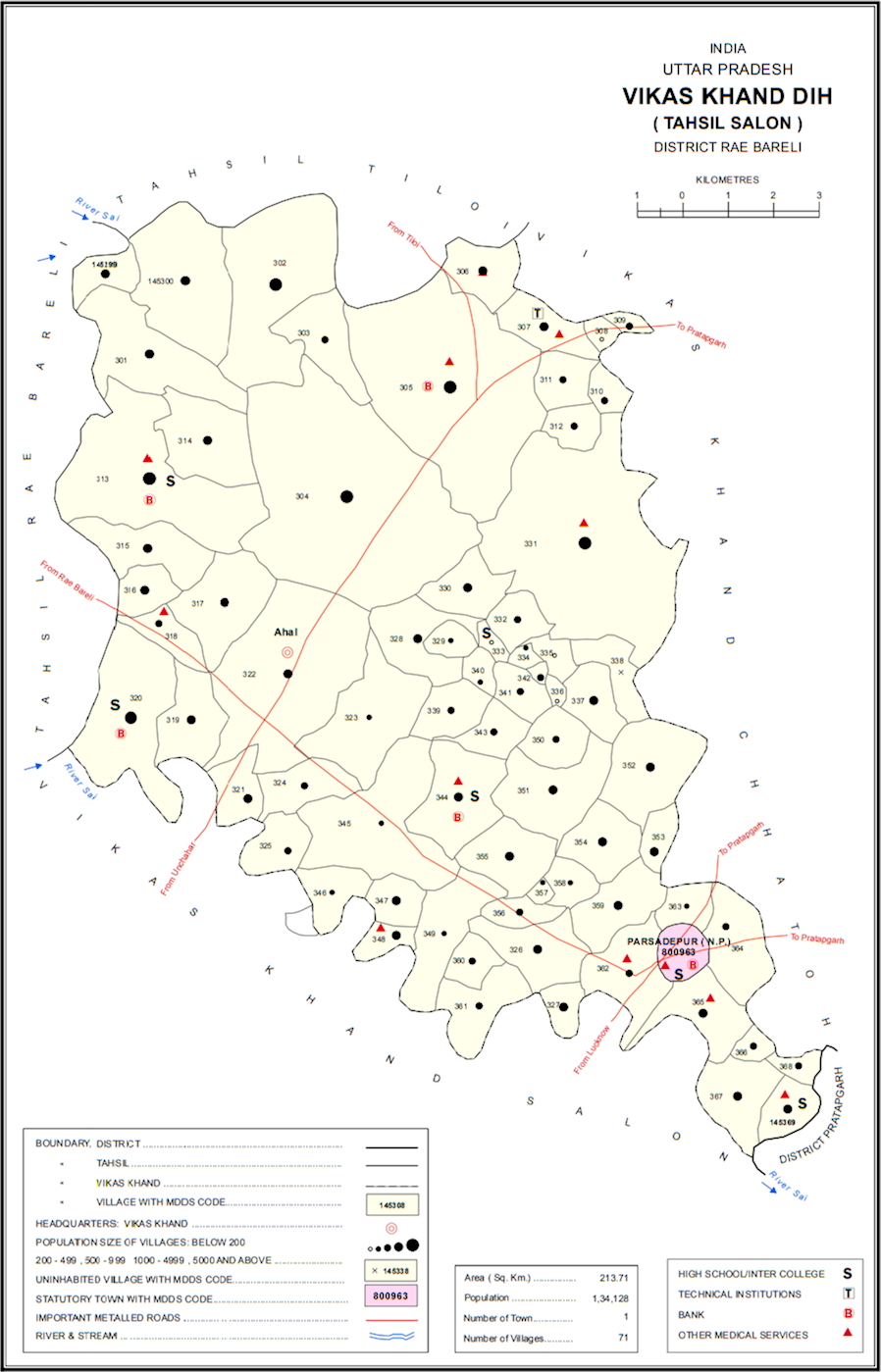
- Map showing Sirsa (#328) in Dih CD block

- Location in Uttar Pradesh, India
- Coordinates: 26.142999°N 81.438224°E
- Country: India
- State: Uttar Pradesh
- District: Raebareli

Area
  - Total: 2.622 km^{2} (1.012 sq mi)

Population (2011)
  - Total: 1,395
  - Density: 532.0/km^{2} (1,378/sq mi)

Languages
  - Official: Hindi
- Time zone: UTC+5:30 (IST)
- Vehicle registration: UP-35

Sirsi is a village in Dih block of Rae Bareli district, Uttar Pradesh, India. It is located 25 km from Raebareli, the district headquarters. As of 2011, it has a population of 1,395 people, in 261 households. It has one primary school and no healthcare facilities, and it hosts both a permanent market and a weekly haat. It belongs to the nyaya panchayat of Birnawan.

The 1951 census recorded Sirsi as comprising 6 hamlets, with a total population of 462 people (241 male and 221 female), in 108 households and 96 physical houses. The area of the village was given as 684 acres. 7 residents were literate, all male. The village was listed as belonging to the pargana of Rokha and the thana of Nasirabad.

The 1961 census recorded Sirsi as comprising 4 hamlets, with a total population of 455 people (229 male and 226 female), in 102 households and 102 physical houses. The area of the village was given as 684 acres.

The 1981 census recorded Sirsi as having a population of 759 people, in 171 households, and having an area of 276.81 hectares. The main staple foods were listed as wheat and rice.

The 1991 census recorded Sirsi as having a total population of 711 people (378 male and 333 female), in 142 households and 142 physical houses. The area of the village was listed as 263 hectares. Members of the 0-6 age group numbered 152, or 21% of the total; this group was 59% male (89) and 41% female (63). Members of scheduled castes made up 55% of the village's population, while no members of scheduled tribes were recorded. The literacy rate of the village was 25% (146 men and 31women). 245 people were classified as main workers (184 men and 61 women), while 40 people were classified as marginal workers (all women); the remaining 426 residents were non-workers. The breakdown of main workers by employment category was as follows: 142 cultivators (i.e. people who owned or leased their own land); 87 agricultural labourers (i.e. people who worked someone else's land in return for payment); 0 workers in livestock, forestry, fishing, hunting, plantations, orchards, etc.; 0 in mining and quarrying; 3 household industry workers; 2 workers employed in other manufacturing, processing, service, and repair roles; 1 construction worker; 0 employed in trade and commerce; 0 employed in transport, storage, and communications; and 10 in other services.
