= Sot River =

River in Uttar Pradesh, India

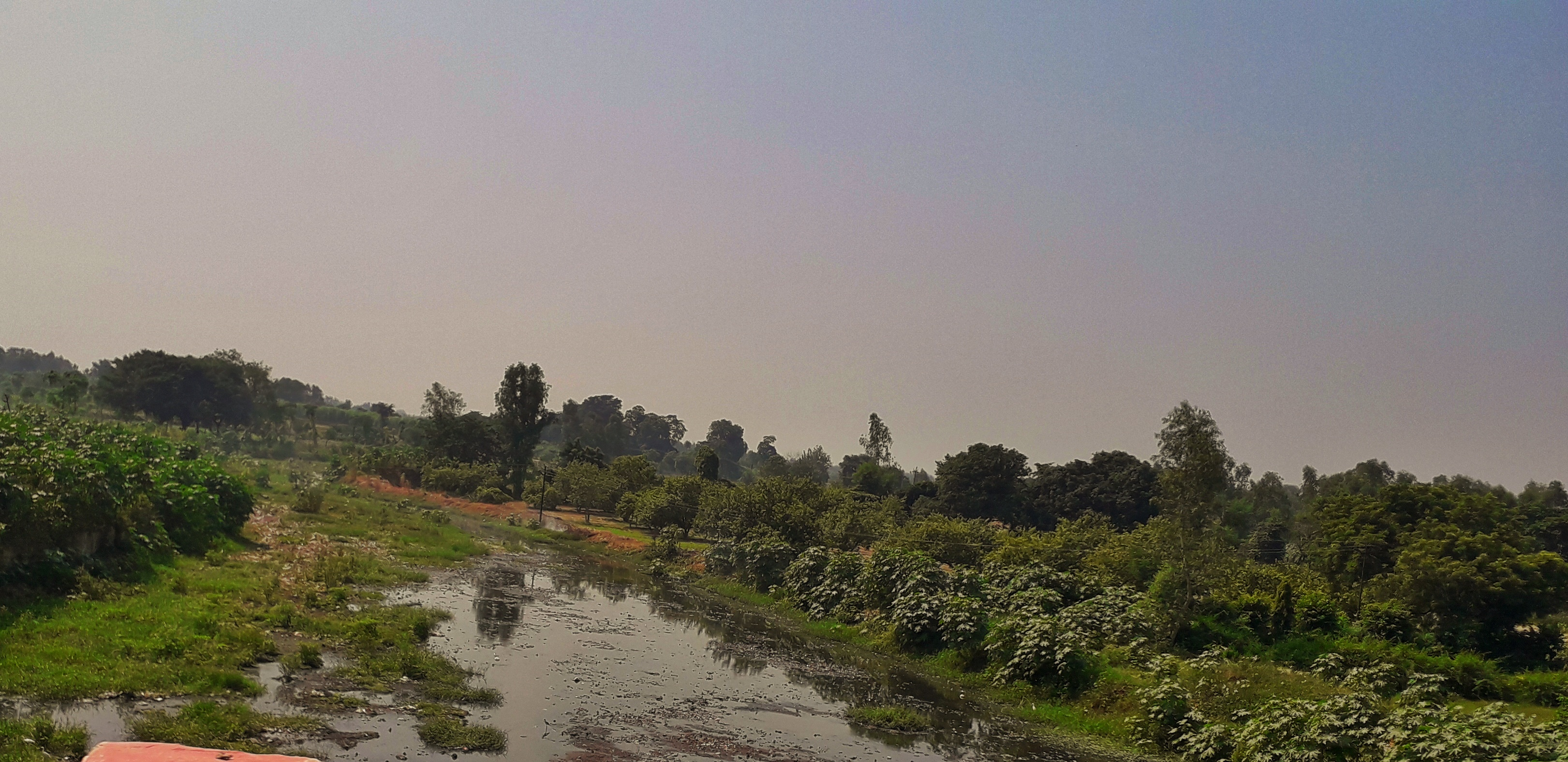
Sot river as seen from Bareilly-Mathura Highway at Budaun

The Sot River, also known as the Sot Nadi, is a seasonal river and tributary of the Ganges located in the Sambhal district of Uttar Pradesh, India. This river holds historical and cultural significance for the region but has faced environmental challenges over the years due to pollution, encroachment, and the drying up of its natural water sources. Recently, revival efforts have been undertaken to restore the river to its former state, which has seen varying degrees of success.

== Revival Efforts ==
The Sambhal district administration's revival project for the Sot River in Uttar Pradesh, has successfully rejuvenated the river through a community-driven approach. This initiative involved dredging, pollutant removal, and habitat restoration, supported by resources from the MGNREGA scheme and local gram panchayats. The project effectively addressed waterlogging and other environmental issues, and its success is attributed to the active involvement of local residents and organizations. It is claimed that the revival has restored the river's flow and ecological balance.
