= Mahatma Jyotiba Phule Rohilkhand University =

Public university in Bareilly, Uttar Pradesh

Coordinates: 28°21′58″N 79°27′26″E

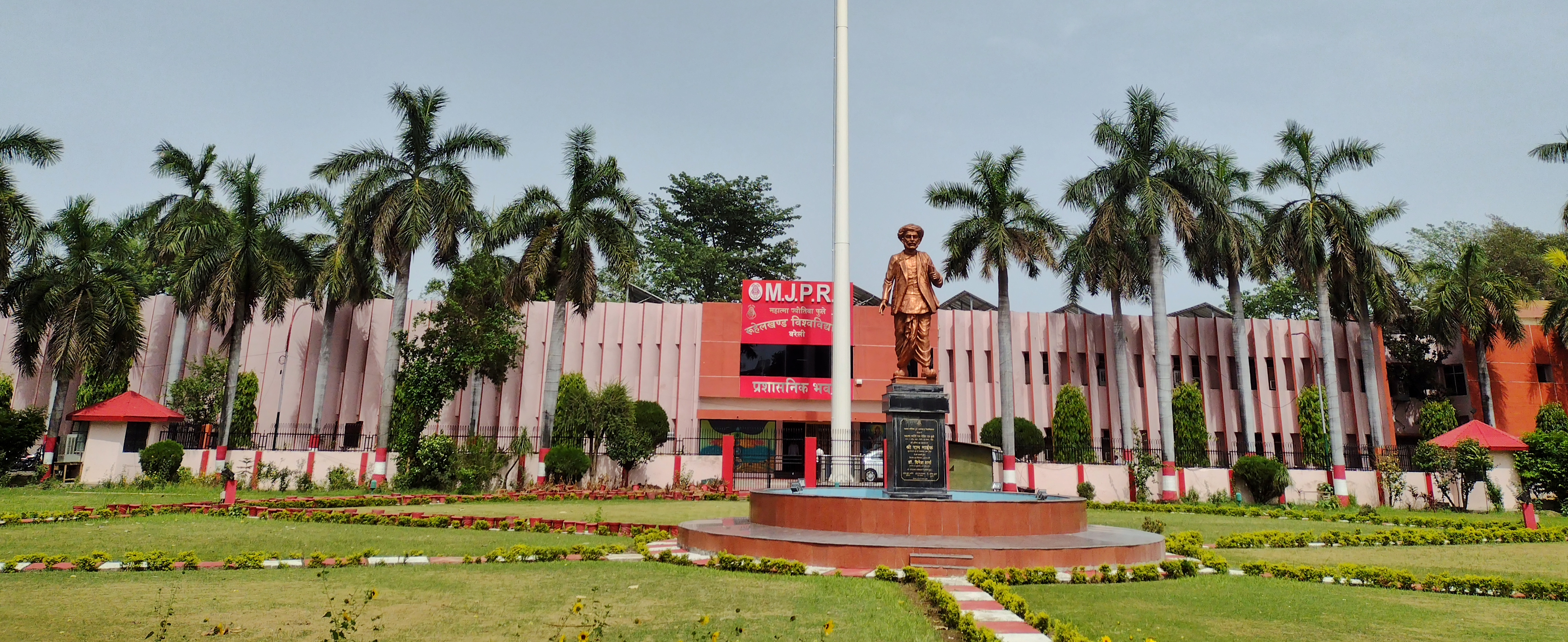
- Administrative Block, MJPRU
- Motto: Keep Moving Ahead
- Type: State
- Established: 1975 (51 years ago)
- Accreditation: NAAC A++
- Affiliations: UGC, BCI
- Chancellor: Governor of Uttar Pradesh
- Vice-Chancellor: Krishna Pal Singh
- Location: Bareilly, Uttar Pradesh, India
- Website: www.mjpru.ac.in

Mahatma Jyotiba Phule Rohilkhand University is a State university located in the city of Bareilly in Uttar Pradesh, India.

== History ==
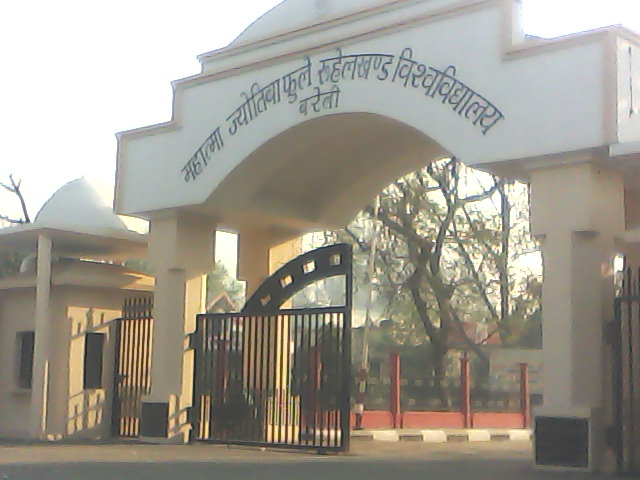
Main gate of Rohilkhand University

The university was established in 1975 as Rohilkhand University vide the Uttar Pradesh Universities (Re-enactment and Amendment) Act, 1974 and it started functioning from 15 February 1975. It got the status of a residential university in 1985, when four more departments were increased. In 1987, three more departments were added. It was renamed as Mahatma Jyotiba Phule Rohilkhand University in August 1997 in honour of social reformer Mahatma Jyotiba Phule.

== Campus ==
The university campus is spread over 206 acres (83 ha) on the outskirts of Bareilly city along Pilibhit bypass road and its territorial jurisdiction extends over the districts of Bareilly, Budaun, Pilibhit and Shahjahanpur in Uttar Pradesh.

== Ranking ==
University rankings

Pharmacy – India
- NIRF (2024): 101–125

The university is rated A++ by the NAAC, and is categorised as a Category-1 university by UGC. In 2024, National Institutional Ranking Framework ranked the university among top 101–125 Pharmacy colleges/universities in India.

== Notable alumni ==
- Javed Ali Khan, Politician
- Salona Kushwaha, Politician
- Mohammed Shami, cricketer
- Rajpal Yadav, film actor
- Y. D. Sharma, professor
- Rahul Johri, executive
- Vinod Kapri, film maker

== See also ==
- Faculty of Pharmacy, Uttar Pradesh University of Medical Sciences
- Chhatrapati Shahu Ji Maharaj University
- Government Degree College Sambhal
