= Pt. Ram Prasad Bismil Autonomous State Medical College, Shahjahanpur =

Medical college in Uttar Pradesh

Autonomous State Medical College Shahjahanpur and Pt. Ram Prasad Bismil District Hospital
- Type: Government
- Established: 2019; 7 years ago
- Affiliations: Atal Bihari Vajpayee Medical University (2021–present)
- Principal: Dr. Rajesh Kumar
- Location: Dharnipur Jignera, Shahjahanpur, Uttar Pradesh, 242226, India; 27.8180189°N 79.8410153°E
- Website: http://www.smcshah.in/

Autonomous State Medical College, Shahjahanpur or Autonomous State Medical College Shahjahanpur and associated Pt. Ram Prasad Bismil District Hospital is a Government Medical college. It was established in year 2019 at Shahjahanpur.

== About college ==
The college imparts the degree Bachelor of Medicine and Surgery (MBBS).The selection to the college is done on the basis of merit through National Eligibility and Entrance Test. Yearly undergraduate student intake is 100 from the year 2019.

== Courses ==
Autonomous State Medical College, Shahjahanpur undertakes education and training of students MBBS courses with annual intake of 100 students The College has also started DNB courses and the prospect of Post-graduation courses in future is increasing.

== See also ==
- List of hospitals in India
