= Atal Bihari Vajpayee Medical University =

State university in Uttar Pradesh, India

- Motto: Arogyamev Atal Amritam
- Motto in English: Health is the inevitable nectar
- Type: State university
- Established: 2020; 6 years ago
- Chancellor: Governor of Uttar Pradesh
- Vice-Chancellor: Maj. Gen. (Dr.) Amit Devgan
- Location: Lucknow, Uttar Pradesh, India; 26.7822697°N 81.0171127°E
- Campus: Urban
- Website: abvmuup.edu.in

Atal Bihari Vajpayee Medical University (ABVMU) is a state university run by the state government. It is an affiliating university in Lucknow, Uttar Pradesh (India). It is situated at Chak Ganjaria City, Lucknow and gave affiliation to all government and private medical, dental, paramedical and nursing colleges in the state of Uttar Pradesh. It was established by Uttar Pradesh act no. 42 of 2018, although 2020 is considered as its establishment year, in which appointment of first vice-chancellor happened.

== History ==
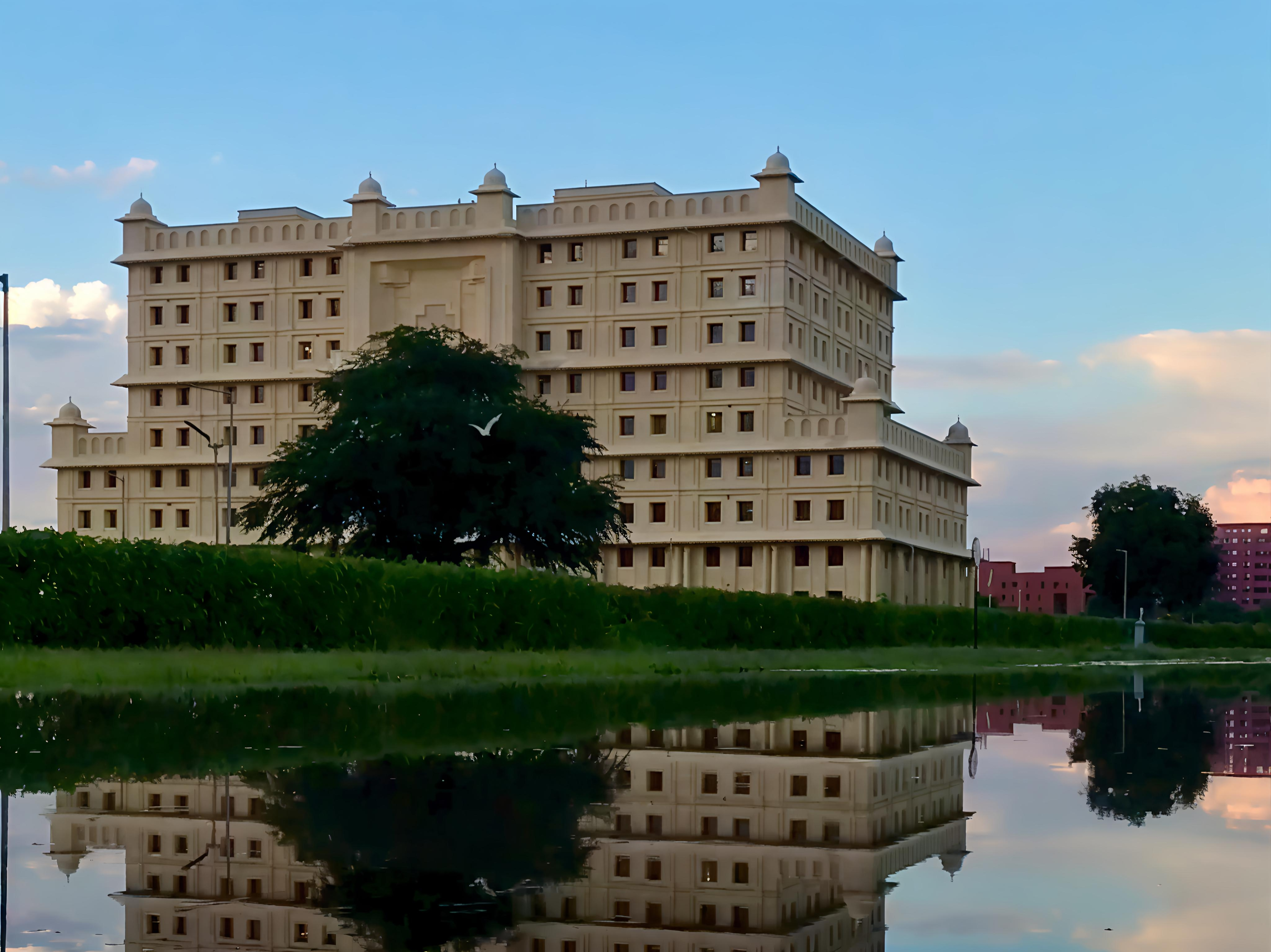
Main Building of ABVMU, Lucknow

The university, which is one of its kind in the state, came into talks around 2018 and the construction started in 2019. The foundation was laid by current Indian prime minister, Narendra Modi on 25 December 2019. The university was expected to open by mid-2020 in its initial phase which was halted for a year due the COVID-19 pandemic in early 2020. It became fully functional in academic year of 2021–22 from a transit campus at Vibhuti Khand, Lucknow. It affiliated all medical, dental, nursing and paramedical college of Uttar Pradesh from academic year 2021–22 and also conducted entrance examination for its affiliated paramedical and nursing colleges for academic year of 2021–22.

In its first phase, the university will have complete infrastructure to house a state-of-the-art auditorium and administrative block. The second phase will see establishment of a hospital and teaching facilities. State medical education department has invited tenders from major construction agencies and PWD is the nodal agency for the project.

=== Vision ===
To be one of the best medical hub for providing comprehensive teaching, training and research to all health care workers.

=== Mission ===
To serve the society by providing adequately trained manpower which can cater to the health needs, beginning from prevention to primary care to tertiary care.

== Courses ==
Through affiliated colleges, university offers MBBS course of 4.5 years + 1-year internship, dental courses of 4.5 years + 1-year internship, paramedical courses of 3 and 4 years respectively and nursing courses of 2–4 years. The admissions have started from academic year 2021–22 onwards.

== Affiliated Colleges ==
College	City	Established
Autonomous State Medical College	Firozabad	2019
Autonomous State Medical College	Kushinagar	2024
Rajarshi Dashrath Autonomous State Medical College	Ayodhya	2019
Maharshi Vashishtha Autonomous State Medical College and OPEC Hospital	Basti	2019
Veerangana Avanti Bai Lodhi Autonomous State Medical College	Etah	2021
Maharaja Suhel Dev Autonomous State Medical College	Bahraich	2019
Amar Shaheed Jodha Singh Attaiya Thakur Dariyao Singh Medical College	Fatehpur	2019
Dr. Sone Lal Patel Autonomous State Medical College	Pratapgarh	2021
Autonomous State Medical College	Hardoi	2021
Pt. Ram Prasad Bismil Autonomous State Medical College	Shahjahanpur	2019
Uma Nath Singh Autonomous State Medical College	Jaunpur	2014
Baba Raghav Das Medical College	Gorakhpur	1972
Ganesh Shankar Vidyarthi Memorial Medical College	Kanpur	1956
KMC Medical College & Hospital	Maharajganj	2024
Motilal Nehru Medical College	Prayagraj	1961
Sarojini Naidu Medical College	Agra	1854
National Capital Region Institute of Medical Sciences	Meerut	2018
