= List of villages in Budaun district =

Villages in Budaun District

The Budaun district of Uttar Pradesh state of India is administratively divided into six tehsils named: Bilsi, Bisauli, Budaun, Dataganj, Gunnaur and Sahaswan, and for implementation of development scheme the district is divided into 18 Blocks.

Block wise villages in Budaun district.

== Villages in Asafpur block ==
Asafpur block Code is 173. The villages include:-

- Ahrauli
- Ajitpur
- Allahpur Khurd
- Ambiapur
- Asafpur Phakawali
- Ashokpur
- Banjaria Khanpur
- Bargavan
- Banjaria Khanpur
- Basaumi
- Bharatpur
- Bhur Bisauli
- Bidha Nagala
- Dabthara
- Dabtora
- Dabtori
- Daraila
- Daulatpur
- Davri
- Dhanyavali pirdhan list
- Dhoondpur
- Dhoranpur
- Gangoli
- Gulariya
- Guriyari
- Habibpur
- Hardaspur
- Jaitpur
- Jalalpur
- Karengi
- Karlawala
- Kheradas
- Kuarera
- Kuwwan Danda
- Laxmipur
- Mahori
- Malkhanpur
- Mannu Nagar
- Mohkampur
- Mugrra
- Musia Nagala
- Navabpura
- Nehdoli
- Nizampur Shah
- Noornagar Kauria
- Orchhi
- Parmanandpur
- Parsia
- Parvejnagar
- Pindara
- Pipariya
- Pisanhari
- Prithvipur
- Puruwa Khera
- Rajtikoli
- Ratanpur
- Sahawar Shah
- Saindola
- Sangrampur
- Sikri
- Sirsawan
- Sisraka
- Sureni Papri

== Villages in Ambiapur block ==
Ambiapur block code is 178. The villages include:-

- Akauli
- Ambiapur
- Angaul
- Badrauni
- Badshahpur
- Bagarpur Sagarpur
- Bain
- Bairmai Khurd
- Bamed
- Banbehta
- Bansbaraulia
- Baramai Buzurg
- Barnidhakpur
- Barnighat
- Basawanpur
- Behtagusain
- Behtajabi
- Bhatri Govardhanpur
- Bhikampur Hardopatti
- Bichaula
- Chholayan
- Dabihari
- Dhadoomar
- Dhanauli
- Din Nagar Sheikhpur
- Dudhani
- Faqirabad
- Fateh Nagla
- Fatehullaha Ganj
- Garhauli
- Garhi
- Gatarpur
- Gudhni
- Haidalpur
- Haivatpur
- Hardaspur
- Harganpur
- Hasupur Baheriya
- Jahanabad
- Jarawan
- Jarsaini
- Jinaura
- Karanpur
- Katinna
- Khairati Nagar
- Khairi
- Khausara
- Kherha
- Khulet
- Kurdarni
- Mirzapur Shohra
- Mohammadganj
- Mooseypur
- Mustafabad Tappa Ahamadnagar
- Nagarjhoona
- Nagla Dallu
- Nagla Tarau
- Naipindari
- Nizampur
- Oya
- Paharpur
- Palpur
- Pindaul
- Pusgawan
- Raipur Buzurg
- Rampur Mazra
- Rampur Tanda
- Risauli
- Rudeina Ghangholi
- Rujhan
- Sabdalpur
- Sadarpur
- Sahaspur
- Sateti Patti Choora
- Sateti Patti Inchha
- Sateti Patti Sukhat
- Satetipatti Gaja
- Serasaulpatti Kunwarsahai
- Shahbazpur
- Shahzadnagar
- Siddhpur Chitrasen
- Simribhojpur
- Sirasaul Patti Seetaram
- Sirasaulpatti Jasa
- Sirtaul
- Sundar Nagar
- Surajpur
- Tigora Isapur
- Ulikhya

== Villages in Bisauli block ==
Bisauli block code is 177. The villages include:-

- Aadpur
- Aipura
- Ajanavar
- Alauaa
- Angthara
- Atarpura
- Basai
- Behta Pathak
- Bhanpur
- Bhatpura
- Bhavipur
- Bhilaulia
- Bisauli
- Chandpura
- Chani
- Chhivukalan
- Dharmpur Biharipur
- Dhilwari
- Etmadpur
- Fatehpur
- Firozpur
- Gadgaon
- Gandhrauli
- Govindpur Shivnagar
- Hatsa
- Husainpur
- Kaloopur
- Karanpur
- Karkheri
- Khajuria
- Kot
- Kudhauli
- Madanjudi
- Maithra
- Manakpur
- Maujampur
- Mithamai
- Mohammadpur Mai
- Mundia Satasi
- Nagpur
- Nasrol
- Nibhera Sarvarpur
- Paiga Bhikampur
- Panaudi
- Papgaon
- Parauli
- Pipri Raghunathpur
- Pivari
- Raipur Kalan
- Rajpur Katghar
- Ranet Govindpur
- Ratanpur Palia
- Sadruddin Nagar
- Sahanpur
- Sarera
- Sarva
- Sedauli
- Sharah Baraulia
- Shekhupura
- Sichauli
- Siddhpur Kaithauli
- Svaroop Pur
- Tarapur
- Damminagar

== Villages in Dahgavan block ==
Dahgavan block code is 179. The villages include:-

- Alehadadpur Dhobai
- Amanpur
- Antar
- Badauli Sagarpur
- Bairpur Manpur
- Bajpur
- Bastoi Sikri
- Bhawanipur Khalli

== Villages in Dataganj block ==
Dataganj block code is 185. The villages include:-

- Andhrau
- Atsena
- Azampur
- Bakhtpur
- Baksena
- Basela
- Behta Madho
- Bhagautipur
- Kundra

== Villages in Gunnaur block ==
Gunnaur block code is 171. The villages include:-

- Afjalpur
- Akbarpur
- Asadpur
- Aurangabad
- Baghau
- Baghura Karia Khera
- Bahlolpur
- Bamanpuri

== Villages in Islamnagar block ==
Islamnagar block code is 174. The villages include:-

- Achalpur
- Agras
- Bajhangi
- Balpur
- Bhawanipur Nagla
- Bhusaya
- Buddh Nagar
- Byorkasmabad
- Kisaira Ibadulla Nagar

== Villages in Jagat block ==
Jagat block code is 181. The villages include:-

- Jagat
- Aam Ganv
- Ahoramai
- Arifpur Navada
- Bakarpur Kharair
- Bhasrala
- Budhvayee
- Karaulia
- Khunak
- Kisarua
- Kupri
- Kutrai
- Maujampur
- Padauva
- Unaula

== Villages in Junawai block ==
Junawai block code is 172. The villages include:-

- Ahrola Nawazi
- Ajitpur
- Babakkarpur
- Baghoi
- Bairpur Maharaji
- Bairpur Sewa
- Bandrai
- Bijua Nagala

== Villages in Mion block ==
Mion block code is 186. The villages include:-

- Abhigaon
- Ajitpur
- Adharra Kunia
- Afzalpur Kalan
- Agesi
- Bajheda

== Villages in Qadar Chowk block ==
Qadar Chowk block code is 183. The villages include:-

- Allapur Chamari
- Asrasi
- Bamnausi
- Barachirra
- Baraura
- Behta Dambarnagar
- Bhakora
- Bhamuiya Bhadsia
- Gauramai
- Ismailpur
- Mindholi Mirzapur
- Ramzanpur
- Lohther

== Villages in Rajpura block ==
Rajpura block code is 170. The villages include:-

- Rajpura
- Arthal
- Bagder
- Bahatkaran
- Baibhur

== Villages in Salarpur block ==
Salarpur block code is 180. Villages include:-

- Babat
- Badal
- Balliya
- Bangavan
- Barate Gadar
- Bhagautipur
- Bhajpura
- Dahemi
- Dhakia
- Kunar
- Kusaina
- Lalei
- Shikrapur
- Titauli
- Yusuf Nagar

== Villages in Sahaswan block ==
Sahaswan block code is 177. The villages include:-

- Abbu Nagar
- Afzalpur Chhaganpur
- Ahmad Nagar Asouli
- Anandipur
- Athgauna
- Aurangabad Tappa Jamni
- Baderiya
- Bahvalpur

== Villages in Samrer block ==
Samrer block code is 184. The villages include:-

- Amroli
- Bachhiliya Pukhta
- Barahi Sahora
- Baura
- Bautharia
- Bhagawanpur
- Brahmpur
- Chutmuri

== Villages in Ujhani block ==
Ujhani block code is 182. The villages include:-

- Abdulla Ganj
- Achaura
- Adauli
- Ahirvara
- Allapur Bhogi
- Badaun Chungi Bahar
- Baramal Dev
- Baramay Khera
- Bastara
- Bharkuiya
- Bitroi
- Chandau
- Gurai
- Jirauliya
- Jyorapar Vala
- Kurau
- Naushera

== Villages in Usawan block ==
Usawan block code is 187. The villages include:-

- Asamya Rafatpur
- Atena Pukhta
- Babai Bhatpura
- Bachheli Daranagar
- Bachi Jhajhrau
- Barainia
- Bhakroli
- Bhasundhra

== Villages in Wazirganj block ==
Wazirganj block code is 176. Villages include:-

- Hatra
- Ageyee
- Bagrain
- Bankota
- Baripura
- Barour Amanullapur
- Bhatani
- Byoli
- Chinjari
- Nizampur
- GopalVarshneyji
