= Hatra, Badaun =

Hatra Hatra
- village
- Location in Uttar Pradesh, India Hatra (India)
- Coordinates: 28.23°N 79.06°E
- Country: India
- State: Uttar Pradesh
- District: Budaun
- Established: 1963

Government
  - Body: Gram Panchayat

Population (2011 Census of India)
  - Total: 2,646

Languages
  - Official: Hindi & Urdu
- Time zone: UTC+5:30 (IST)
- Postal code: 243639
- Vehicle registration: UP 24

Hatra is a village in Wazirganj block, Budaun district, Uttar Pradesh, India. It is in the Wazirganj nagar panchayat. Budaun railway station is 27 KM away from the village.

== Population ==
According to 2011 Census of India, the total village population is 6508, out of 3,367 are males and 3,141 are females.

== Road ==
There is a road that leads up to Wazirganj Town. As of 2018, it is a paved road. From Wazirganj there is also a paved road leading up to the District Center of Badaun. Wazirganj is the panchayat center for that area and is about one or two kilometers away from Hatra. Badaun is about forty or fifty kilometers away.
