= Jirauliya =

Village in Budaun, Uttar Pradesh

- village
- Location in Uttar Pradesh, India Jirauliya (India)
- Coordinates: 28.05°N 79.06°E
- Country: India
- State: Uttar Pradesh
- District: Badaun

Government
  - Body: Gram Panchayat

Population (2011 Census of India)
  - Total: 491

Languages
  - Official: Hindi
- Time zone: UTC+5:30 (IST)
- PIN: 243601
- Vehicle registration: UP 24

Jirauliya is a village in Ujhani block, Budaun Tehsil and Budaun district, Uttar Pradesh, India. The major cast of the village residents is Kurmi. The village is administrated by Gram Panchayat. Budaun railway station is 6 KM away from the village. Its Village code is 128471.
