= Kurau =

Kurau may refer to:

== People ==
- Johann Walter-Kurau, a Latvian painter
- Peter Kurau, an American musician

== Locations ==
- Kurau, Budaun, a village in Uttar Pradesh, India
- Kuala Kurau, a mukim in Perak, Malaysia
  - Kuala Kurau (state constituency), a state constituency in Perak, Malaysia
  - Batu Kurau (state constituency), a state constituency in Perak, Malaysia
- Telok Kurau, a residential enclave in Singapore
- Telok Kurau Secondary School, a co-educational international secondary school in Bedok, Singapore

== Japanese media franchises ==
- Kurau Phantom Memory, a 2004 science fiction anime series
- Tenchi wo Kurau, a manga series by Hiroshi Motomiya followed by four games:
  - Dynasty Wars (Tenchi wo Kurau)
  - Warriors of Fate (Tenchi wo Kurau 2: Sekiheki no Tatakai)
  - Destiny of an Emperor (Tenchi wo Kurau)
  - Tenchi wo Kurau II: Shokatsu Kōmei Den
