= Mion =

Mion may refer to:

== People ==
- Alain Mion, French pianist and singer
- Charles-Louis Mion (1699–1775), French composer
- Frédéric Mion, French civil servant
- Giuseppe Mion, Austrian ice hockey player
- Jérémie Mion, French competitive sailor
- Luigi Mion, Italian painter
- Marcos Mion, Brazilian TV host and actor
- Mion Mukaichi (born 1998), Japanese singer
- Mion Nakagawa (born 2002), Japanese singer and former member idol group of NMB48
- Tina Mion, American contemporary artist

=== Fictional characters ===
- Sonozaki Mion (園崎 魅音), a character from the Higurashi no Naku Koro ni visual novel, anime and manga

== Other ==
- Mion, Budaun, a block and village panchayat in Uttar Pradesh, India
- Mion District, one of the 26 districts in the Northern Region of Ghana
- Mion (Ghana parliament constituency)
