= Lalei =

Village in Budaun, Uttar Pradesh

- village
- Location in Uttar Pradesh, India Lalei (India)
- Coordinates: 28.12°N 79.13°E
- Country: India
- State: Uttar Pradesh
- District: Badaun

Government
  - Body: Gram panchayat

Population (2011 Census of India)
  - Total: 1,486

Languages
  - Official: Hindi
- Time zone: UTC+5:30 (IST)
- PIN: 243601
- Vehicle registration: UP 24

Lalei is a village and gram panchayat in Salarpur block, Budaun district, Uttar Pradesh, India. Its village code is;128314. The village is located 11 km north from Budaun railway station. According to 2011 Census of India, the total population of the village is 1486, out of 798 are males and 688 are females.
