= Gauramai =

Village in Budaun, Uttar Pradesh

- Village
- Location in Uttar Pradesh, India
- Coordinates: 27.95°N 79.12°E
- Country: India
- State: Uttar Pradesh
- District: Badaun

Population (2011 Census of India)
  - Total: 2,845

Languages
  - Official: Hindi
- Time zone: UTC+5:30 (IST)
- PIN: 243601
- Vehicle registration: UP 24

Gauramai is a village in Qadar Chowk Block, Budaun district, Uttar Pradesh, India. Its village code is 128624. The village is administrated by Gram Panchayat. Budaun railway station is 21 km away from the village. According to 2011 Census of India, the total population of the village is 2,845, out of 1,501 are males and 1,344 are females.
