= Khanduva =

- Country: India
- State: Uttar Pradesh
- District: Moradabad
- Block: Rustamnagar Sahaspur

Languages
  - Official: Hindi
  - Spoken languages: Hindi, Urdu
- Time zone: UTC+05:30 (IST)
- Postal code: 244411

Khanduva, or Khandua, is a village panchayat located in the district of Moradabad, Uttar Pradesh in India.

== Geography ==
Khanduva is 153.3 Kilometers away from Delhi, 190 Kilometers away from Dehardun, Utharakhand. 28°36'15.4"N 78°46'41.1"E 28.604267, 78.778087

== Demographics ==
According to the 2011 census, there were 2,152 people and 297 households in Khanduva.. The census reported that there were 1,134 men and 1,018 women..

== History ==
Khanduva first gained notoriety in 1995 when its people held a protest against the local administration at the Tehsil level for the acceptance of their caste (Turaiha) as a scheduled caste. The Turaiha caste was listed in the Scheduled Caste (SC) category of several states in the country, however, local administration declined to issue Turaiha the SC certificates. After years of struggling to obtain the certification, the people of Khanduva formed a community known as the Turaiha Samaj. In 2002, another protest was unsuccessfully held against the District Magistrate. In 2007, the Turaiha held a sit-in protest or dharna, against state government at Lucknow parliament. In 2008, the Turaiha Samaj filed a case in Allahabad High court that eventually resulted in the Uttar Pradesh government to issue Government Order accepting the Turaiha as a Scheduled Caste.

The village is renowned for communal harmony sacred images with 12 temples and one mosque despite a population of approximately 2600 residents. The village was inhabited by the ancestors of the Turaiha people in late 1700s. According to a legend, the Turaiha are descended from three siblings who inhabited three nearby villages named Sataran, Khanduva, and Bahadurpur. Many other castes came to the village in the 19th and 20th centuries.

== Languages and culture ==
The native language of Khandua is Hindi. Other languages spoken include English, Urdu, and Bhojpuri.

The nearest railway station to Khandua is Raja Ka Sahaspur (2 kilometers total distance). Other railway stations and their distance from Khandua are as follows: Raja Ka Sahaspur 2.1 km. Kundarkhi railway station 8.9 km. Sirsi Mukhdumpr railway station 13.9 km. Chandausi Jn railway station 15.8 km. Sambhal Hatim Sarai railway station 20.3 km. Asafpur railway station 25.0 km.

Khandua's nearest airport is Moradabad Airport situated at 28.1 km distance. Additional airports in the area are as follows. Moradabad Airport 28.1 km. Bareilly Airport 67.9 km. Pantnagar Airport 82.8 km.

The other nearest district headquarters is Amroha situated at 56.8 km distance from Khandwa. Surrounding districts from Khandua are as follows. Jyotiba_Phule_Nagar (amroha) district 56.8 km. Rampur 51 km Sambhal 26.8 km Budaun (budaun) district 83.1 km. Bijnor (bijnor) district 111 km. Nainital (Nainital) district 140 KM. Kanshi_Ram_Nagar (kasganj) district 119 km.

The nearest town or city to Khandua is Bilari, located 3.7 kilometers away (6 minutes from NH24 Highway) and 3.2 km (4 minutes from Rustam Nagar Sahaspur NH 24) Surrounding town/city/TP/CT from Khandua are the following. Ayodhya Sugar Mills & Distillery 2 km Bilari 3.7 km. Ibrahimpur 8.9 km. Kundarki 10.8 km. Narauli 12.6 km. Sirsi 13.5 km.

The nearest schools are as listed below:

Ram Ratan Inter College Bilari (Cricket Ground) 3.4 km. Shanker Shahay Girls Inter College 3.6 km HS Inter college Raja Ka Sahaspur 3.5 km. Junior High School Raja Ka Sahaspur 3.2 km. Primary School Village Khandua 0 km. HS High School 0.9 km.
