= Basrizal Koto =

Basrizal Koto (born October 11, 1959 in Padang Pariaman, West Sumatra) is a businessman from Indonesia; the owner of a well-known Indonesian conglomerate. Usually addressed as "Basko", he is involved with media, printing, mining, livestock, hospitality, and property.

== Early life ==
Koto was born in Kampung Ladang, Padang Pariaman, to parents Ali Absyar and Djaninar. His early life was poor, his family eating only once a day. Because of his difficult life, he stopped studying and migrated to Pekanbaru, Riau. His mother reminded him that if you goes to a foreign territory, he must be able to communicate, take advantage of opportunities, and work with a high commitment. He later moved his family to Riau.

== Business ==
Koto started with a Minang restaurant. He tried his hands at different professions, ranging from kernet, driver, caterer, tailor to finally becoming a car dealer. He currently manages about 15 companies and since 2006, is involved in coal mining, newspapers, cable TV and internet for whole of Sumatera.

Some of Koto's companies include PT Basko Minang Plaza (shopping centre), PT Cerya Riau Mandiri Printing (printing), PT Cerya Zico Utama (property), PT Bastara Jaya Muda (coal mining), PT Riau Agro Mandiri (livestock), PT Riau Agro Mandiri Perkasa (seedling, meat canning), PT Indonesian Mesh Network (cable TV and internet), and PT Best Western Hotel (hotel). He developed Best Western Hotel, the four-star hotel in Padang, with 198 rooms.

Koto also owns Haluan Media Group, which include the oldest and one of the largest newspaper in West Sumatra, Haluan.

== See also ==
- Minangkabau businesspeople
- Bastara
