= Nagla Sharki =

Coordinates: 28°07′N 78°23′E

Nagla Sharki Nagla Purvi
- village
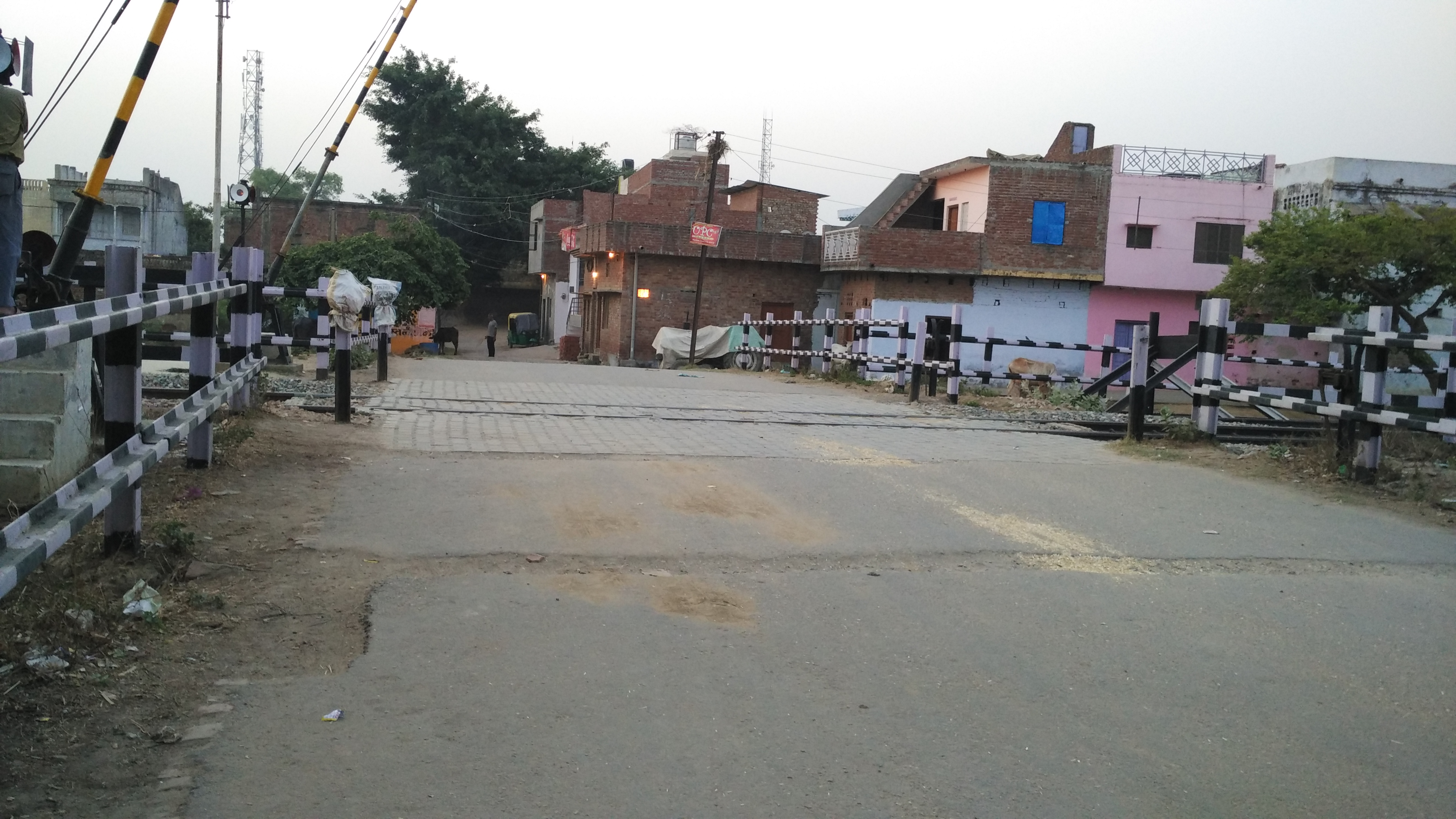
- Nickname: Nagla
- Interactive map of Nagla Sharki
- Country: India
- State: Uttar Pradesh
- District: Badaun

Government
  - Body: Gram panchayat

Population (2011 Census of India)
  - Total: 6,298

Languages
  - Official: Hindi
- Time zone: UTC+5:30 (IST)
- Postal code: 243601

Nagla Sharki (or Nagla Purvi) is a village in Jagat Tehsil, Budaun district, Uttar Pradesh, India.

Nagla Sharki is located 4 kilometers from Budaun city. It is best known by the goddess Kali Devi temple Nagla Mandir. Nagla Sharki village is administrated by the Sarpanch of the village. Kurmi is the majority caste of people in the village.

The Budaun railway station is located at the distance of 1 kilometer from the village.
