= Ismailpur, Budaun =

Village in Budaun, Uttar Pradesh

Ismailpur
- village
- Location in Uttar Pradesh, India Ismailpur (India)
- Coordinates: 27.96155°N 79.08492°E 3
- Country: India
- State: Uttar Pradesh
- District: Badaun

Government
  - Body: Gram panchayat

Population (2011 Census of India)
  - Total: 1,205

Languages
  - Official: Hindi
- Time zone: UTC+5:30 (IST)
- PIN: 243601
- Vehicle registration: UP 24

Ismailpur is a village in Qadar Chowk Block, Budaun district, Uttar Pradesh, India. Its village code is 128561. The village is administrated by Gram Panchayat. According to 2011 Census of India, the total population of the village is 1205 out of 634 are males and 571 are females.
