= History of Regional Rural Banks in Uttar Pradesh =

History of Regional Rural Bank in Uttar Pradesh, India

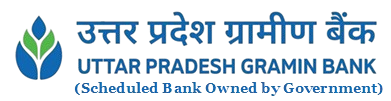
UPGB logo used since 1 August 2025

The Regional Rural Banks (RRBs) were established under the provision of RRBs Act, 1976, Act No. 21 of 1976 [9 February 1976]. with an objective to create an alternative channel to the cooperative credit structure so as to facilitate an expanded bandwidth of institutional credit for the agriculture and rural sector. It started with 5 RRBs in the year 1975, first RRB was set up on 2 October 1975 under the provisions of the Ordinance promulgated on 26 September 1975, for the purpose of development of agriculture, trade, commerce, industry and other productive activities in the rural areas, credit and other facilities, particularly to small and marginal farmers, agricultural labourers, artisans and small entrepreneurs, and for matters connected therewith and incidental thereto. RRBs carry the basic mandate of ensuring rural development and foster financial inclusion.

RRBs in the last 5 decades have transformed rural banking in providing easy access to financial services.

Initially there were 36 RRBs functional in Uttar Pradesh since 1975. Out of which 1 RRB Kshetriya Kisan Gramin Bank was sponsored by Uttar Pradesh state Co-operative Bank Ltd.

Prathama Bank, with head office in Moradabad, Uttar Pradesh was the first RRB established on 2 October 1975. It was sponsored by Syndicate Bank and had an authorized capital of Rs. 5 crore.

== Amalgamations ==
This is the list of amalgamations held in Uttar Pradesh at various points of time

=== Amalgamation during financial year 2005-06 ===
In the financial year 2005-06, 23 RRBs amalgamated to form 7 RRBs

| S.No. | Name | Head Office | Sponsor Bank |
|---|---|---|---|
| 1 | Baroda Eastern Uttar Pradesh Gramin Bank | | Bank of Baroda |
| 2 | Baroda Western Uttar Pradesh Gramin Bank | | Bank of Baroda |
| 3 | Kashi Gomti Samyukt Gramin Bank | Varanasi | Union Bank of India |
| 4 | Lucknow Kshetriya Gramin Bank | Sitapur | Allahabad Bank |
| 5 | Purvanchal Gramin Bank | Gorakhpur | State Bank of India |
| 6 | Triveni Kshetriya Gramin Bank | Orai | Allahabad Bank |
| 7 | Uttar Pradesh Gramin Bank | Meerut | Punjab National Bank |

=== Amalgamation during financial year 2006-07 ===
| S.No. | Name | Head Office | Sponsor Bank | Date of Establishment | Amalgamated Bank | Head Office | Sponsor Bank | Date of Establishment |
|---|---|---|---|---|---|---|---|---|
| 1 | Aligarh Kshetriya Gramin Bank | Aligarh | Canara Bank | | Shreyas Gramin Bank | Aligarh | Canara Bank | 1 June 2006 |
| 2 | Etah Gramin Bank | Etah | Canara Bank | 1977 | Shreyas Gramin Bank | Aligarh | Canara Bank | 1 June 2006 |
| 3 | Jamuna Gramin Bank | Agra | Canara Bank | | Shreyas Gramin Bank | Aligarh | Canara Bank | 1 June 2006 |
| 4 | Avadh Gramin Bank | | Bank of India | 7 June 1977 | Aryavart Gramin Bank | Lucknow | Bank of India | 3 October 2006 |
| 5 | Barabanki Gramin Bank | Barabanki | Bank of India | 26 March 1976 | Aryavart Gramin Bank | Lucknow | Bank of India | 3 October 2006 |
| 6 | Farrukhabad Gramin Bank | Farrukhabad | Bank of India | 29 March 1976 | Aryavart Gramin Bank | Lucknow | Bank of India | 3 October 2006 |

=== Amalgamation during financial year 2007-08 ===
| S.No. | Name | Head Office | Sponsor Bank | Amalgamated Bank | Head Office | Date of Establishment | Sponsor Bank |
|---|---|---|---|---|---|---|---|
| 1 | Devi Patan Gramin Bank | Gonda | Punjab National Bank | Sarva U.P. Gramin Bank | Meerut | 23 November 2007 | Punjab National Bank |
| 2 | Kisan Gramin Bank | Budaun | Punjab National Bank | Sarva U.P. Gramin Bank | Meerut | 23 November 2007 | Punjab National Bank |
| 3 | Rani Laxmi Bai Kshetriya Gramin Bank | Jhansi | Punjab National Bank | Sarva U.P. Gramin Bank | Meerut | 23 November 2007 | Punjab National Bank |
| 4 | Uttar Pradesh Gramin Bank | Meerut | Punjab National Bank | Sarva U.P. Gramin Bank | Meerut | 23 November 2007 | Punjab National Bank |
| 5 | Baroda Eastern Uttar Pradesh Gramin Bank | | Bank of Baroda | Baroda Uttar Pradesh Gramin Bank | Raebareli | 31 March 2008 | Bank of Baroda |
| 6 | Baroda Western Uttar Pradesh Gramin Bank | | Bank of Baroda | Baroda Uttar Pradesh Gramin Bank | Raebareli | 31 March 2008 | Bank of Baroda |

=== Amalgamation during financial year 2009-10 ===
| S.No. | Name | Head Office | Sponsor Bank | Amalgamated Bank | Head Office | Date of Establishment | Sponsor Bank |
|---|---|---|---|---|---|---|---|
| 1 | Balliya Kshetriya Gramin Bank | Balliya | Central Bank of India | Balliya Etawah Kshetriya Gramin Bank | Balliya | 1 January 2010 | Central Bank of India |
| 2 | Etawah Kshetriya Gramin Bank | Etawah | Central Bank of India | Balliya Etawah Kshetriya Gramin Bank | Balliya | 1 January 2010 | Central Bank of India |
| 3 | Lucknow Kshetriya Gramin Bank | Sitapur | Allahabad Bank | Allahabad UP Gramin Bank | Banda | 2 March 2010 | Allahabad Bank |
| 4 | Triveni Kshetriya Gramin Bank | Orai | Allahabad Bank | Allahabad UP Gramin Bank | Banda | 2 March 2010 | Allahabad Bank |

=== Amalgamation during financial year 2012-13 ===
| S.No. | Name | Head Office | Date of Establishment | Sponsor Bank | Amalgamated Bank | Head Office | Sponsor Bank | Date of Establishment |
|---|---|---|---|---|---|---|---|---|
| 1 | Aryavart Gramin Bank | Lucknow | 3 October 2006 | Bank of India | Aryavart Kshetriya Gramin Bank | Lucknow | Bank of India | 1 October 2012 |
| 2 | Kshetriya Kisan Gramin Bank | Mainpuri | 20 May 1980 | Uttar Pradesh State Co-operative Bank Ltd. | Aryavart Kshetriya Gramin Bank | Lucknow | Bank of India | 1 October 2012 |

=== Amalgamation during financial year 2013-14 ===
| S.No. | Name | Head Office | Sponsor Bank | Date of Establishment | Amalgamated Bank | Head Office | Sponsor Bank | Date of Establishment |
|---|---|---|---|---|---|---|---|---|
| 1 | Purvanchal Gramin Bank | Gorakhpur | State Bank of India | 2005 | Purvanchal Bank | Gorakhpur | State Bank of India | 2013 |
| 2 | Balliya Etawah Gramin Bank | Balliya | Central Bank of India | 1 January 2010 | Purvanchal Bank | Gorakhpur | State Bank of India | 2013 |
| 3 | Aryavart Kshetriya Gramin Bank | Lucknow | Bank of India | 1 October 2012 | Gramin Bank of Aryavart | Lucknow | Bank of India | 1 April 2013 |
| 5 | Shreyas Gramin Bank | Aligarh | Canara Bank | 1 June 2006 | Gramin Bank of Aryavart | Lucknow | Bank of India | 1 April 2013 |

=== Amalgamation during financial year 2019-20 ===
| S.No. | Name | Head Office | Sponsor Bank | Date of Establishment | Amalgamated Bank | Head Office | Sponsor Bank | Date of Establishment |
|---|---|---|---|---|---|---|---|---|
| 1 | Gramin Bank of Aryavart | Lucknow | Bank of India | 1 April 2013 | Aryavart Bank | Lucknow | Bank of India | 1 April 2019 |
| 2 | Allahabad UP Gramin Bank | Banda | Allahabad Bank | 2 March 2010 | Aryavart Bank | Lucknow | Bank of India | 1 April 2019 |
| 3 | Prathama Bank | Moradabad | Syndicate Bank | 2 October 1975 | Prathama U.P. Gramin Bank | Moradabad | Punjab National Bank | 1 April 2019 |
| 4 | Sarva U.P. Gramin Bank | Meerut | Punjab National Bank | 23 November 2007 | Prathama U.P. Gramin Bank | Moradabad | Punjab National Bank | 1 April 2019 |

=== Amalgamation during financial year 2020-21 ===
Union Bank of India had sponsored four RRBs in India out of which three were in U.P namely, Kashi Gramin Bank, Gomti Gramin Bank and Samyut Kshetriya Gramin Bank. Samyut Khetriya Gramin Bank established on 6 Jan 1976, with its Head Office at AZAMGARH. It covered four districts It had 168 branches.

| S.No. | Name | Head Office | Sponsor Bank | Date of Establishment | Amalgamated Bank | Head O fice | Sponsor Bank | Date of Establishment |
|---|---|---|---|---|---|---|---|---|
| 1 | Baroda Uttar Pradesh Gramin Bank | Raebareli | Bank of Baroda | 31 March 2008 | Baroda U.P. Bank | Gorakhpur | Bank of Baroda | 1 April 2020 |
| 2 | Kashi Gomti Samyukt Gramin Bank | Varanasi | Union Bank of India | September 2005 | Baroda U.P. Bank | Gorakhpur | Bank of Baroda | 1 April 2020 |
| 3 | Purvanchal Bank | Gorakhpur | State Bank of India | 2013 | Baroda U.P. Bank | Gorakhpur | Bank of Baroda | 1 April 2020 |

=== Amalgamation during financial year 2025-26 ===
| S.No. | Name | Head Office | Sponsor Bank | Amalgamated Bank | Head Office | Sponsor Bank | Date of Establishment |
|---|---|---|---|---|---|---|---|
| 1 | Aryavart Bank | A-2/46, Vijay Khand, Gomti Nagar, Lucknow; 226010 | Bank of India | Uttar Pradesh Gramin Bank | 2nd and 3rd floor, NBCC Commercial Complex, Vardan Khand, Gomti Nagar Extension; Lucknow, Uttar Pradesh - 226010 | Bank of Baroda | 1 May 2025 |
| 2 | Baroda U.P. Bank | Taramandal, Gorakhpur; 273016 | Bank of Baroda | Uttar Pradesh Gramin Bank | 2nd and 3rd floor, NBCC Commercial Complex, Vardan Khand, Gomti Nagar Extension; Lucknow, Uttar Pradesh - 226010 | Bank of Baroda | 1 May 2025 |
| 3 | Prathama U.P. Gramin Bank | Ram Ganga Vihar Phase 2, Moradabad; 244001 | Punjab National Bank | Uttar Pradesh Gramin Bank | 2nd and 3rd floor, NBCC Commercial Complex, Vardan Khand, Gomti Nagar Extension; Lucknow, Uttar Pradesh - 226010 | Bank of Baroda | 1 May 2025 |

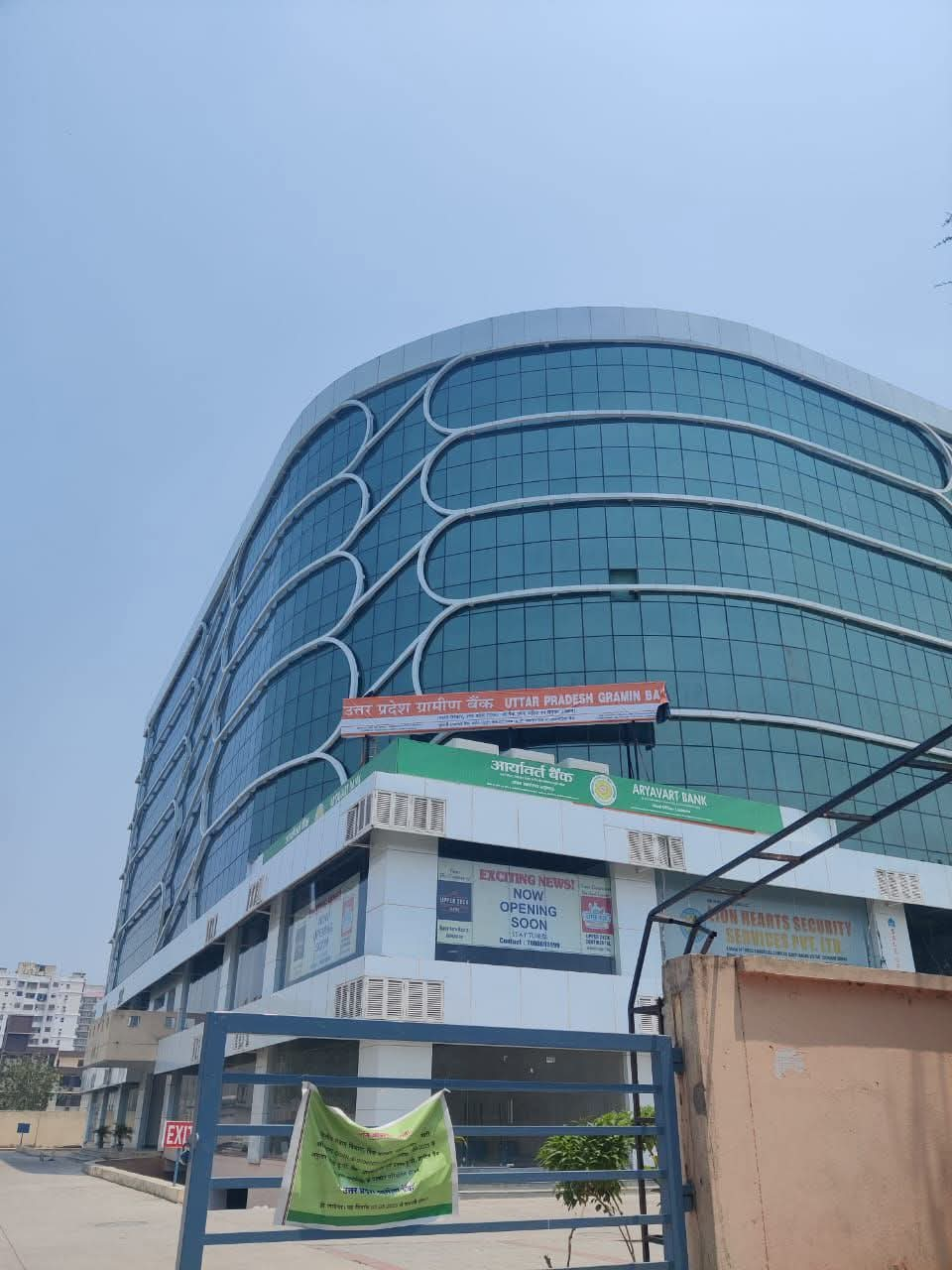
UPGB headquarters building used since 1 April 2025
