= Surajpur, Budaun =

Village in Budaun, Uttar Pradesh

Surajpur
- village
- Location in Uttar Pradesh, India Surajpur (India)
- Coordinates: 28.19632°N 78.97522°E
- Country: India
- State: Uttar Pradesh
- District: Badaun

Government
  - Body: Gram panchayat

Population (2011 Census of India)
  - Total: 992

Languages
  - Official: Hindi
- Time zone: UTC+5:30 (IST)
- Vehicle registration: UP 24

Surajpur is a village in Ambiapur Block, Budaun district, Uttar Pradesh, India. Its village code is 128398. As per the report of 2011 Census of India, The total population of the village is 992, where 480 are males and 512 are females. The village is administrated by Gram Panchayat.
