= Kupri =

Kupri may refer to:

- Kupri Amazai, village in Pakistan
- Kupri, Budaun, village and gram panchayat in Jagat block, Budaun district, Uttar Pradesh, India
- Altun Kupri, town north of Kirkuk in Kirkuk Governorate in Iraq
- The Primate Research Institute of Kyoto University, whose work with Project Ai has made progress in understanding chimpanzee communication.
