= Kupri, Budaun =

Village in Budaun, Uttar Pradesh

Kupri
- village
- Location in Uttar Pradesh, India Kupri (India)
- Coordinates: 27.94°N 79.25°E
- Country: India
- State: Uttar Pradesh
- District: Badaun

Government
  - Body: Gram panchayat

Population (2011 Census of India)
  - Total: 1,210

Languages
  - Official: Hindi
- Time zone: UTC+5:30 (IST)
- PIN: 243601
- Vehicle registration: UP 24

Kupri is a village and gram panchayat in Jagat block, Budaun district, Uttar Pradesh, India. Its village code is 128441. The village is located 16 KM East from Budaun railway station. According to 2011 Census of India, the total population of the village is 1210, out of 675 are males and 535 are females.
