= Bharkuiya =

Village in Budaun, Uttar Pradesh

Bharkuiya Bharkunia, Bharquiya
- village
- Location in Uttar Pradesh, India Bharkuiya (India)
- Coordinates: 28.07°N 79.08°E
- Country: India
- State: Uttar Pradesh
- District: Badaun

Government
  - Body: Gram Panchayat

Population (2011 Census of India)
  - Total: 1,734

Languages
  - Official: Hindi
- Time zone: UTC+5:30 (IST)
- Postal code: 243639
- Vehicle registration: UP 24

Bharkuiya is a village in Ujhani Tehsil and Budaun district, Uttar Pradesh, India. Its village code is 128474. It is 13 km away from Budaun railway station. As per the report of 2011 Census of India, The total population of the village is 1734, where 947 are males and 787 are females. The village is administrated by Gram Panchayat.
