= Shikrapur =

Shikrapur may refer to:

- Shikrapur, Maharashtra, a panchayat village in Maharashtra, India
- Shikrapur, Budaun, a village and gram panchayat in Uttar Pradesh, India
