= Karaulia =

Village in Budaun, Uttar Pradesh

- village
- Location in Uttar Pradesh, India Karaulia (India)
- Coordinates: 28.02°N 79.20°E
- Country: India
- State: Uttar Pradesh
- District: Badaun

Government
  - Body: Gram panchayat

Population (2011 Census of India)
  - Total: 1,759

Languages
  - Official: Hindi
- Time zone: UTC+5:30 (IST)
- PIN: 243601
- Vehicle registration: UP 24

Karaulia is a village in Jagat block, Budaun district, Uttar Pradesh, India. Its village code is 128387. The village is administrated by Gram panchayat. Budaun railway station is 7 km away from the village. As per the report of 2011 Census of India, The total population of the village is 1759, where 928 are males and 831 are females.
