= Kutrai =

Village in Budaun, Uttar Pradesh

- village
- Location in Uttar Pradesh, India Kutrai (India)
- Coordinates: 28.04°N 79.21°E
- Country: India
- State: Uttar Pradesh
- District: Badaun

Government
  - Body: Gram panchayat

Population (2011 Census of India)
  - Total: 2,207

Languages
  - Official: Hindi
- Time zone: UTC+5:30 (IST)
- PIN: 243601
- Vehicle registration: UP 24

Kutrai is a village in Jagat block, Budaun district, Uttar Pradesh, India. Its village code is 128433. Budaun railway station is 11 km away from the village. According to 2011 Census of India population of the village is 2,207, in which 1,210 are males and 997 are females.
