= Ludwig Passini =

Austrian artist (1832–1903)

Ludwig Johann Passini
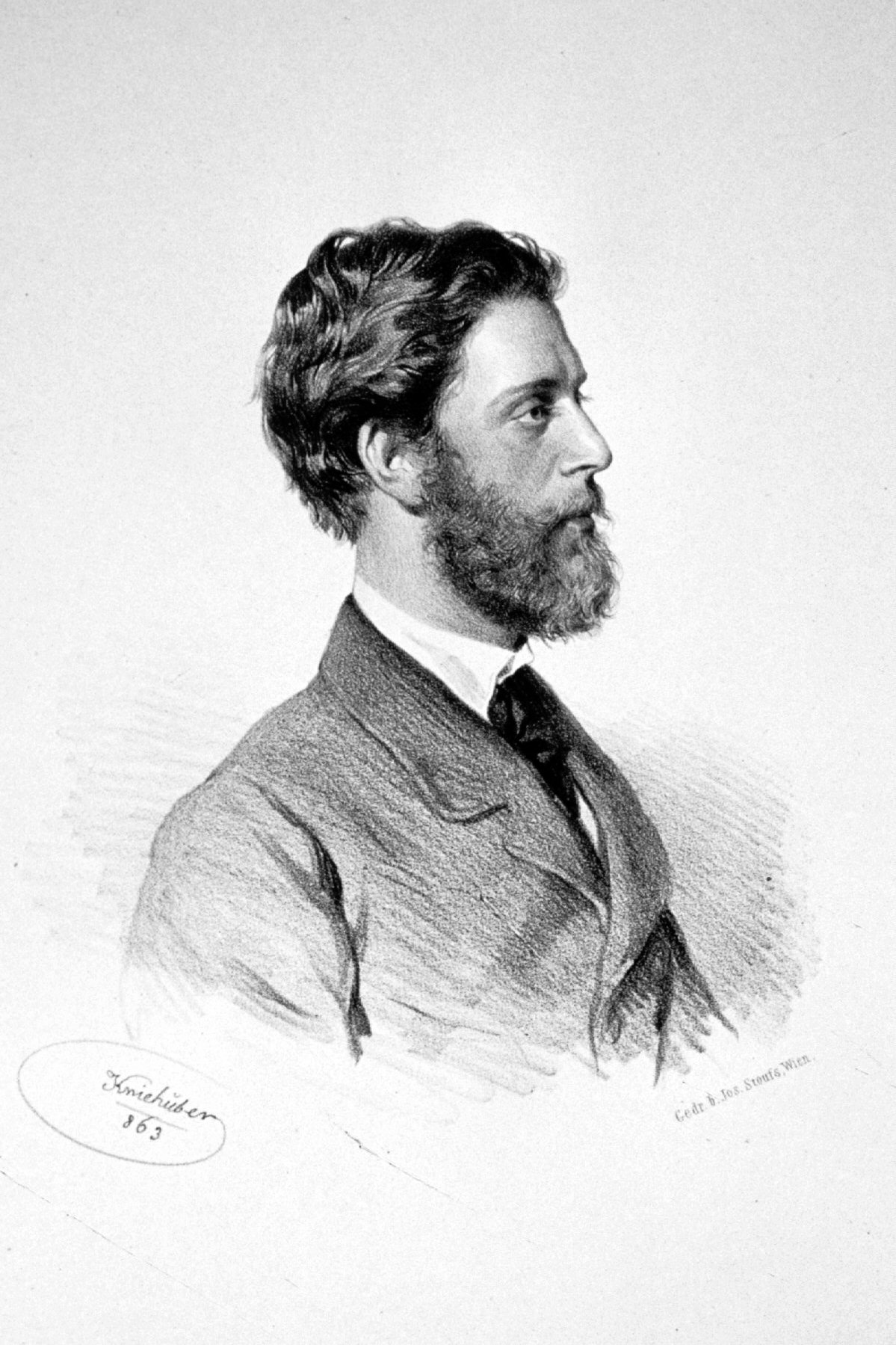
- Ludwig Passini, Lithography by Josef Kriehuber
- Born: 9 July 1832; Vienna
- Died: 6 November 1903 (aged 71); Venice
- Education: Vienna Academy of Art
- Known for: watercolour and oil painting, printmaking

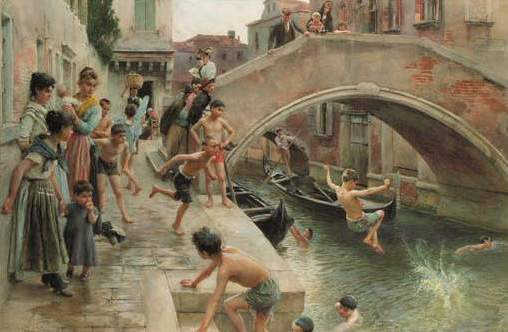
Figures on a Venetian canal

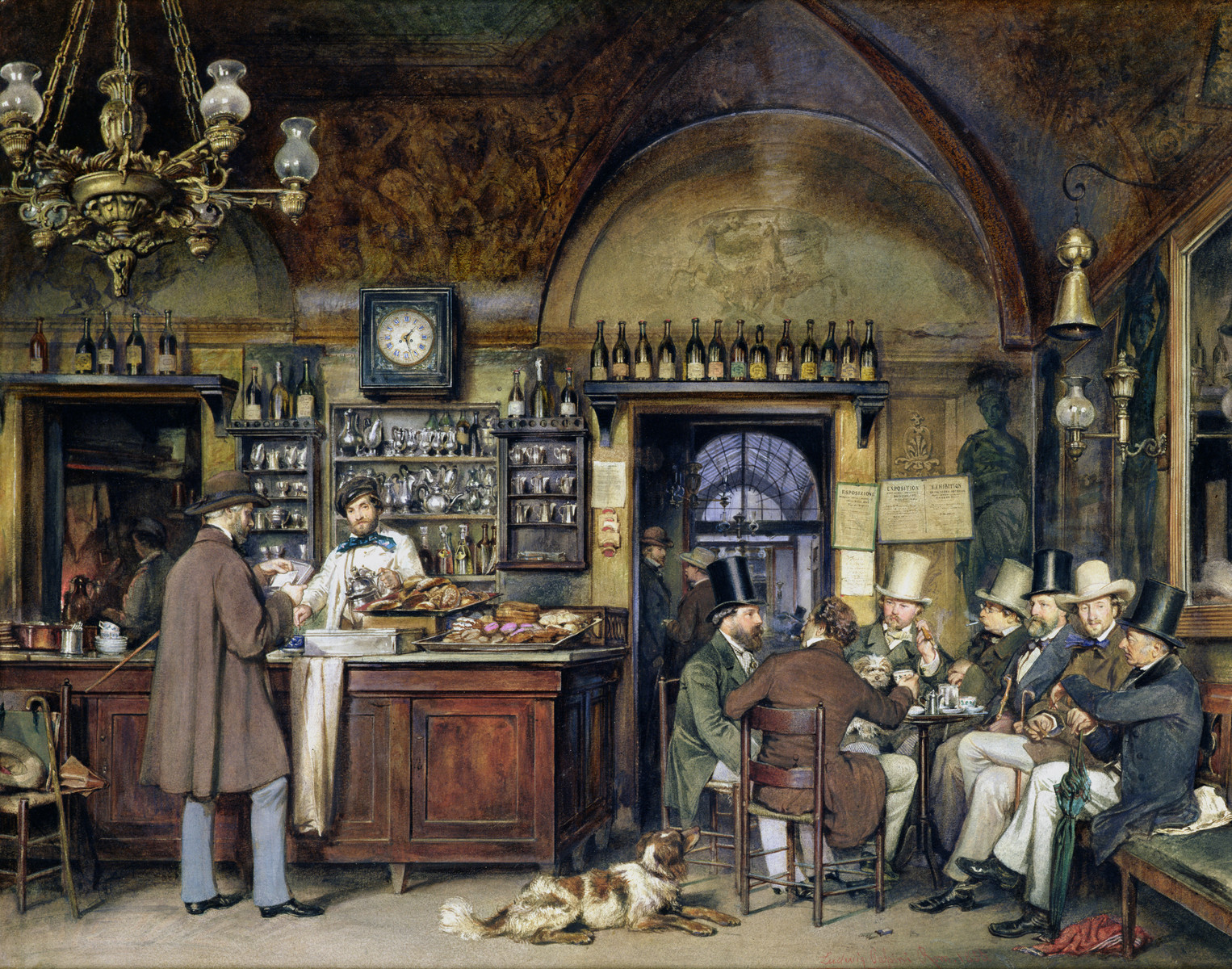
Ludwig Passini – Caffè Greco in Rome

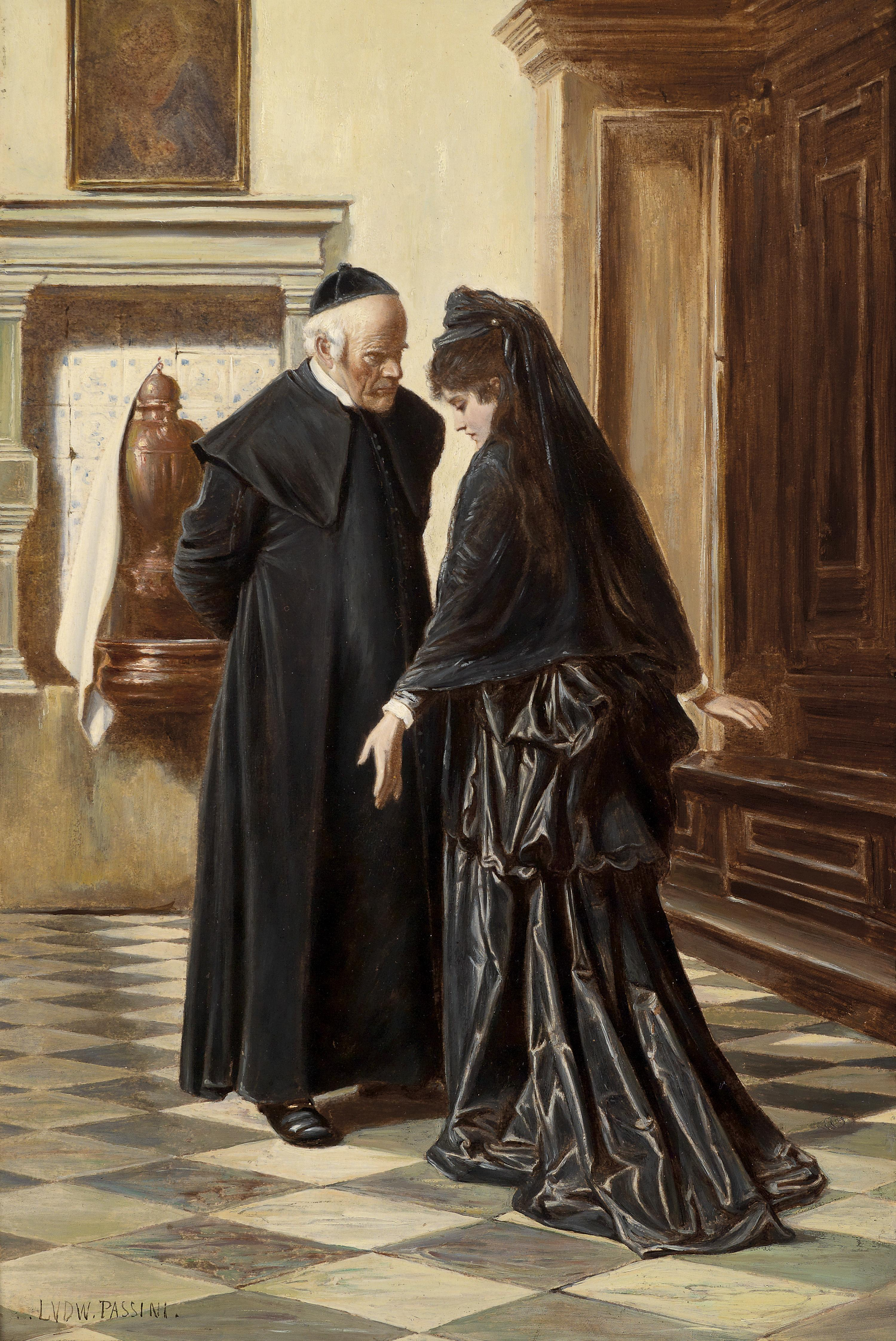
Ludwig Passini – An earnest conversation

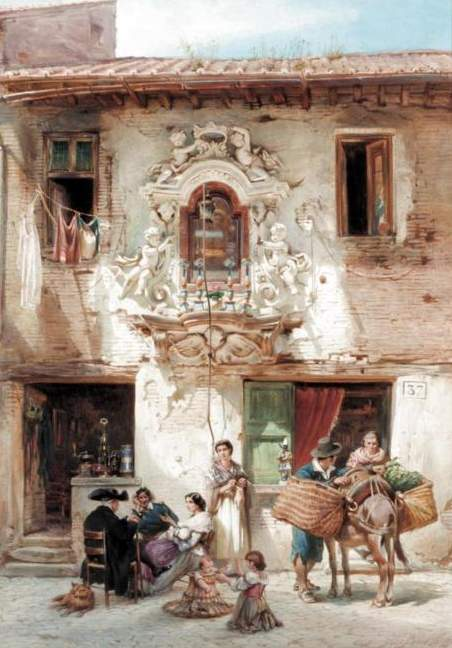
Ludwig Passini – Roman street scene

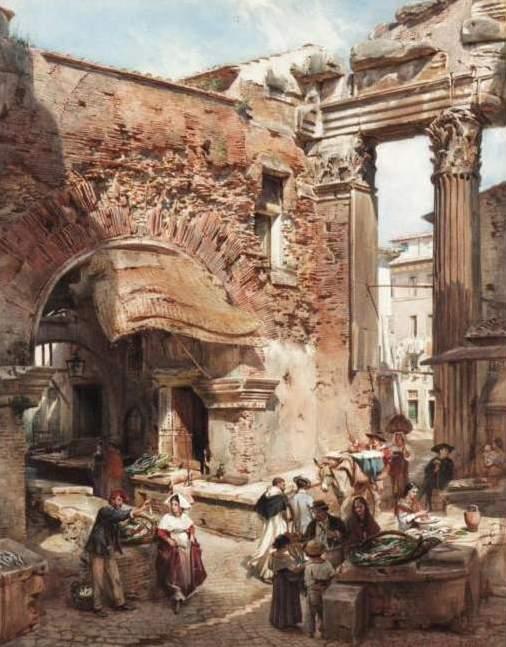
Ludwig Passini – Roman Fish Market at Sant'Angelo in Pescheria

Ludwig Johann Passini (1832–1903), sometimes Ludovico Passini, was an Austrian narrative and genre painter and printmaker.

== Personal life ==
Ludwig Passini was born on 9 July 1832 in Vienna, the son of Louise Passini and the engraver Johann Nepomuk Passini. The Passini family moved to Trieste in 1850. On 9 November 1864 Passini married Anna Warschauer (1841–1866), who was the daughter of Robert and Mary Warschauer, the great-granddaughter of banker Joseph Mendelssohn and the great-great-granddaughter of philosopher Moses Mendelssohn. The couple, who lived alternately in Berlin and Rome, had one daughter. Anna died one and a half years after the wedding.

Ludwig Passini died on 6 November 1903 in Venice.

== Career ==
Passini was taught art first by his father, and later studied at the Vienna Academy of Art under the painters Joseph von Führich and Leopold Kupelwieser. In the 1850s, Passini settled in Venice, where he worked in the studio of Carl Werner. He had previously studied under Werner at Leipzig, and he accompanied Werner on his painting tour of Italy. The fellow artist Anton Romako was also part of Werner's studio. Between 1853 and 1870 Passini lived in Rome, where his work became focused on the human figure set against architectural and interior elements, and within narrative themes. From 1873, and for the rest of his life, he remained in Venice – though with occasional visits to Berlin – where his watercolours often featured everyday Venetian life, ordinary people, and portraiture.

While in Venice, Passini became part of the artist colony of Henry Woods, August von Pettenkofen, Carl van Haanen, Eugene de Blaas, Wolkoff, Ruben, and Thoren. Passini occupied a studio in the Palazzo Vendramin Calergi for thirty years with fellow artists Carlo Reichardt and Luigi Mion. While here, in 1892, he painted his portraits of Katherine Bronson and Edith, her daughter, and the English Under-Secretary of State for Foreign Affairs and art historian Sir Henry Layard. A further two 1892 portraits were of the American art collectors Jack Gardner (also a businessman), and his wife Isabella (founder of Fenway Court art museum), who lived at the Palazzo Barbaro. Isabella had commissioned the paintings after meeting Passini at a dinner party held by Katherine Bronson. The portrait of Isabella was not successful and did not survive.

A friend of Passini was the exiled Richard Wagner, who died at Vendramin Calergi in 1883. Passini, along with fellow painter Wolkoff, suggested a death mask for Wagner. The idea was at first rejected by Wagner's wife Cosima, but was carried out by Passini and the sculptor Augusto Benvenuti under the agreement, and eye, of Cosima's daughter, Daniela.

The first Venice Biennale was held in 1895 as an exhibition of Italian art. In formulating the Biennale in 1893, the mayor of Venice, Riccardo Selvatico, was advised by a committee of internationally exhibiting artists from many European countries, one being Ludwig Passini.

Passini received medals in Paris (1870), Vienna (1873), Munich (1879), and Berlin (1896). His works were included in exhibitions at the Royal Academy and the Royal Institute of Painters in Water Colours in London, and he became an honorary member of the latter in 1883. Passini was awarded the Bavarian Maximilian Order for Science and Art in 1893.

In 1878 Passini was made a Knight of the Legion of Honour, and the following year an honorary professor of the Vienna Academy of Art. He was also a member of the Academy of Arts, Berlin and the Academy of Arts, Venice.

== Reception ==
Passini exhibited in the Italian Fine Arts Section of the 1878 Paris Exposition Universelle. The art critic Philip Gilbert Hamerton described Italian painting of the time as playful to the point of being childish, although original with direct observation of nature. Passini's work for the Exposition was considered by critics to have saved the quality of Italian art shown.

The Viennese author and critic Ludwig Hevesi believed Passini to be "the major watercolour painter of Venice... who grew rapidly to be the most important genre painter."

Art historian Wilhelm Lübke described Passini's work: "Admirable character-pictures of Southern life may be found in the masterly watercolours of Ludwig Passini, with their beautifully-finished colouring."

The 19th-century arts magazine The Aldine in 1878 described Passini's pictures as "showing a skill in studying the human face, and an appreciation of its expressions, which indicate natural gift even more than close study... [and] the careful drawing and skillful posing of... figures."

== Selected works ==
His watercolor, I Canonici a vespro, exhibited at the 1867 Exposition of Paris, was awarded the grand gold medal. He painted atmospheric scenes of every day, that is genre scenes, of life in Venice. One of his contemporaries was Carlo Van Haanen. Other works include:Monaci in Coro, la Maddalena, l'Abatino, Un ponte, Le donne al pozzo, La lettura del Tasso a Chioggia, and La vendita delle zucche a Venezia. Works include:

- Monks Buying Fish at the Portal of the Madonna della Misericordia (1855)
- Salone of the Palazzo Barbaro (1855)
- Cafè Greco in Rome (1856), Kunsthalle Hamburg
- Roman Fish Market at Sant'Angelo in Pescheria (1863)
- The confessional (1863)
- The interior of the Basilica of Santa Maria Maggiore (1867)
- The Latin Class (1869)
- A Shared Confidence (1870)
- Praying in a Venetian church (1873)
- Bridge at the Riva degli Schiavoni – A Procession in Venice (1873–74)
- People on a Venetian canal (1893)
- A Clerical Intervention (1897)
