= Naushera, Budaun =

Village in Budaun, Uttar Pradesh

Naushera
- village
- Location in Uttar Pradesh, India Naushera (India)
- Coordinates: 28.00°N 79.09°E
- Country: India
- State: Uttar Pradesh
- District: Badaun

Government
  - Body: Gram Panchayat

Population (2011 Census of India)
  - Total: 3,259

Languages
  - Official: Hindi
- Time zone: UTC+5:30 (IST)
- PIN: 243639
- Vehicle registration: UP 24

Naushera is a village in Ujhani Tehsil and Budaun district, Uttar Pradesh, India. Its village code is 128284. It is 4 km away from Budaun railway station. As per the report of 2011 Census of India, The total population of the village is 3,259, where 53.10 are males and 46.9% are females. The village is administrated by Gram Panchayat.
