= Kundra, Budaun =

Village in Budaun, Uttar Pradesh

Kundra
- village
- Location in Uttar Pradesh, India Kundra (India)
- Coordinates: 28.04°N 79.21°E
- Country: India
- State: Uttar Pradesh
- District: Badaun

Government
  - Body: Gram panchayat

Population (2011 Census of India)
  - Total: 2,054

Languages
  - Official: Hindi
- Time zone: UTC+5:30 (IST)
- PIN: 243601
- Vehicle registration: UP 24

Kundra is a village in Dataganj block, Budaun district, Uttar Pradesh, India. Its village code is 128297. Budaun railway station is 32 km away from the village. According to 2011 Census of India population of the village is 2,054, in which 1,126 are males and 928 are females.

Notable persons born in Kundra:

Shri Rajpal Yadav, the renowned actor of India was born here.
