= Baramal Dev =

- village
- Location in Uttar Pradesh, India Baramal Dev (India)
- Coordinates: 28.00°N 79.03°E
- Country: India
- State: Uttar Pradesh
- District: Badaun

Government
  - Body: Gram panchayat

Population (2011 Census of India)
  - Total: 2,234

Languages
  - Official: Hindi
- Time zone: UTC+5:30 (IST)
- PIN: 243639
- Vehicle registration: UP 24

Baramal Dev is a village and gram panchayat in Ujhani block, Budaun district, Uttar Pradesh, India. Its village code is 128493. According to 2011 Census of India, the total population of the village is 2,234, out of 1,207 are males and 1,027 are females. The village is located 11 km towards west from Budaun City.
