= Padauva =

Village in Budaun, Uttar Pradesh

- village
- Location in Uttar Pradesh, India Padauva (India)
- Coordinates: 28.34°N 78.92°E
- Country: India
- State: Uttar Pradesh
- District: Badaun

Government
  - Body: Gram panchayat

Population (2011 Census of India)
  - Total: 1,914

Languages
  - Official: Hindi
- Time zone: UTC+5:30 (IST)
- PIN: 243601
- Vehicle registration: UP 24

Padauva is a village in Jagat block, Budaun district, Uttar Pradesh, India. It is administered by Gram Panchayat. Budaun railway station is 5 km from the village. According to the 2011 Census of India, its population was 1914, with 1009 males and 905 females.
