= Chandau =

Village in Budaun, Uttar Pradesh

Chandau Bharkunia, Bharquiya
- village
- Location in Uttar Pradesh, India Chandau (India)
- Coordinates: 28.08°N 79.06°E
- Country: India
- State: Uttar Pradesh
- District: Badaun

Government
  - Body: Gram Panchayat

Population (2011 Census of India)
  - Total: 1,334

Languages
  - Official: Hindi
- Time zone: UTC+5:30 (IST)
- PIN: 243639
- Vehicle registration: UP 24

Chandau is a village in the Ujhani block and Budaun district, Uttar Pradesh, India. Its village code is 128467. Budaun railway station is 10 km (6.2 mi) away from the village. The village is administrated by Gram Panchayat.

== Demographics ==
According to the 2011 Census of India, The total population of the village is 1,334; 729 male and 605 female.
