= Ahirvara =

- village
- Location in Uttar Pradesh, India Ahirvara (India)
- Coordinates: 28.00°N 79.03°E
- Country: India
- State: Uttar Pradesh
- District: Badaun

Government
  - Body: Gram panchayat

Population (2011 Census of India)
  - Total: 2,659

Languages
  - Official: Hindi
- Time zone: UTC+5:30 (IST)
- PIN: 243636
- Vehicle registration: UP 24

Ahirvara is a village in Ujhani block, Budaun District, Uttar Pradesh, India. Its village code is 128514. According to 2011 Census of India, the total population of the village is 2659, out of 1439 are males and 1220 are females. The village is located 13 km towards west from Budaun City.
