= Salarpur, Budaun =

Salarpur
- Block
- Location in Uttar Pradesh, India Salarpur (India)
- Coordinates: 28.07°N 79.13°E
- Country: India
- State: Uttar Pradesh
- District: Badaun
- Division: Bareilly

Government
  - Body: Gram panchayat

Population (2011 Census of India)
  - Total: 1,752

Languages
  - Official: Hindi
- Time zone: UTC+5:30 (IST)
- PIN: 243724
- Vehicle registration: UP 24

Salarpur is a Block and village panchayat in Budaun district, Uttar Pradesh, India. Its block code is 0180. 67 panchayat of Budaun district comes under Salarpur block. According to 2011 Census of India, the total houses in Salarpur is 27,767 and total population is 1,68,197 out of 90,637 are males and 77,560 are females.

== Villages under Salarpur block ==
Are the following:

- Ahruiya
- Akram Nagar Gadhi
- Ambiya Pur
- Amiliya
- Anguiya
- Arangabad Mafi
- Asisa Barkhin
- Aurangabad Khalsa
- Azamganj Mandhiya
- Babat
- Badal
- Bahorpura
- Balliya
- Banei
- Bangavan
- Barate Gadar
- Bari Samspur
- Barkhera
- Bhagautipur
- Bhaisamai
- Bhajpura
- Bhatauli
- Bhinduliya Plasi
- Bichhu Raiyya
- Binavar
- Chakaund
- Chandaura
- Dahemi
- Darav Nagar
- Dhakia
- Gurupuri Binaik
- Hasanpur
- Kailee
- Kunar
- Kusaina
- Shikrapur
- Sikrodi
- Silhari
- Titauli
- Usaita
- Yusuf Nagar
