= Jyorapar Vala =

Village in Budaun, Uttar Pradesh

- village
- Location in Uttar Pradesh, India Jyorapar Vala (India)
- Coordinates: 27.99°N 78.90°E
- Country: India
- State: Uttar Pradesh
- District: Badaun

Government
  - Body: Gram Panchayat

Population (2011 Census of India)
  - Total: 4,126

Languages
  - Official: Hindi
- Time zone: UTC+5:30 (IST)
- PIN: 243636
- Vehicle registration: UP 24

Jyorapar Vala is a village in Ujhani Tehsil and Budaun district, Uttar Pradesh, India. Budaun railway station is 28 KM away from the village. The village is administrated by Gram Panchayat. Its village code is 128527. According to 2011 Census of India the total population of the village is 4,126, in which 2,190 are males and 1,936 are females.
