= Asrasi =

Village in Budaun, Uttar Pradesh, India

- village
- Location in Uttar Pradesh, India Asrasi (India)
- Coordinates: 27.91°N 79.08°E
- Country: India
- State: Uttar Pradesh
- District: Badaun

Government
  - Body: Gram panchayat

Population (2011 Census of India)
  - Total: 2,502

Languages
  - Official: Hindi
- Time zone: UTC+5:30 (IST)
- PIN: 243601
- Vehicle registration: UP 24

Asrasi is a village in Qadar Chowk Block, Budaun district, Uttar Pradesh, India. Its village code is 128566. The village is administrated by Gram Panchayat. According to 2011 Census of India, the total population of the village is 2,502 out of 1,320 are males and 1,182 are females.
