= Rural Bank =

Rural Bank may refer to:

- Regional Rural Bank, a type of bank in India
- Bankwest, originally the Rural & Industries Bank of Western Australia
- Rural Bank Limited, a subsidiary of the Bendigo and Adelaide Bank
- State Bank of New South Wales, originally Rural Bank of New South Wales
- The Rural Bank Limited, a former New Zealand Government owned bank later acquired by the National Bank of New Zealand

== See also ==
- Rural Credit Cooperatives
- List of regional rural banks in Uttar Pradesh
