= Kurau, Budaun =

Village in Budaun, Uttar Pradesh

Kurau
- village
- Location in Uttar Pradesh, India Kurau (India)
- Coordinates: 28.05°N 79.08°E
- Country: India
- State: Uttar Pradesh
- District: Badaun

Government
  - Body: Gram Panchayat

Population (2011 Census of India)
  - Total: 2,360

Languages
  - Official: Hindi
- Time zone: UTC+5:30 (IST)
- PIN: 243601
- Vehicle registration: UP 24

Kurau is a village in Ujhani Tehsil and Budaun district, Uttar Pradesh, India. The major cast of the village residents is Kurmi. The village is administrated by Gram Panchayat. Budaun railway station is 6 KM away from the village. Its village code is 128476.
