= Bitroi =

Village in Budaun, Uttar Pradesh

- village
- Location in Uttar Pradesh, India Bitroi (India)
- Coordinates: 27.97°N 78.89°E
- Country: India
- State: Uttar Pradesh
- District: Badaun

Government
  - Body: Gram panchayat

Population (2011 Census of India)
  - Total: 2,342

Languages
  - Official: Hindi
- Time zone: UTC+5:30 (IST)
- PIN: 243636
- Vehicle registration: UP 24

Bitroi is a village and gram panchayat in Ujhani block, Budaun district, Uttar Pradesh, India. Its village code is 128530. According to 2011 Census of India, the total population of the village is 2342, out of 1234 are males and 1108 are females.
