= Kunar, Budaun =

Village in Budaun, Uttar Pradesh

Kunar
- village
- Location in Uttar Pradesh, India Kunar (India)
- Coordinates: 28.12°N 79.09°E
- Country: India
- State: Uttar Pradesh
- District: Badaun

Government
  - Body: Gram panchayat

Population (2011 Census of India)
  - Total: 1,172

Languages
  - Official: Hindi
- Time zone: UTC+5:30 (IST)
- PIN: 243726
- Vehicle registration: UP 24

Kunar is a village in Salarpur block, Budaun district, Uttar Pradesh, India.Village code of Kunar is 128234. As per the report of 2011 Census of India, The total population of the village is 1172, where 616 are males and 556 are females, with 2026 projections putting the population at 1,418, 747 which are males and 682 are females. The village is administrated by Gram Panchayat.
