= Allahabad UP Gramin Bank =

Indian regional bank

Allahabad UP Gramin Bank sponsored by Allahabad Bank was a regional rural bank (RRB) headquartered in Banda established in 2010 as per Government of India Gazette Notification of March 2, 2010 issued by the Indian Ministry of Finance under Sub-Section (1) of Section 23 A of the Regional Rural Bank Act, 1976 (21 of 1976). By the amalgamation of Lucknow Kshetriya Gramin Bank, Sitapur and Triveni Kshetriya Gramin Bank, Orai.

Gramin Bank of Aryavart and Allahabad UP Gramin Bank merged with name Aryavart Bank w. e. f. 01.04.2019. Further on May 1, 2025 Aryavart Bank, Prathama UP Gramin Bank and Baroda UP Bank merged to form Uttar Pradesh Gramin Bank.

== See also ==
- Uttar Pradesh Gramin Bank
- History of Regional Rural Banks in Uttar Pradesh
- Aryavart Bank
