= Ahoramai =

Village in Budaun, Uttar Pradesh

Ahoramai Auramai
- village
- Location in Uttar Pradesh, India Ahoramai (India)
- Coordinates: 28.034547°N 79.220390°E
- Country: India
- State: Uttar Pradesh
- District: Badaun

Government
  - Body: Gram panchayat

Population (2011 Census of India)
  - Total: 1,334

Languages
  - Official: Hindi
- Time zone: UTC+5:30 (IST)
- Vehicle registration: UP 24

Ahoramai is a village in Jagat Tehsil, Budaun district, Uttar Pradesh, India. The Budaun railway station is located at the distance of 8 kilometer from the village. Its village code is 128367. As per the report of 2011 Census of India, The total population of the village is 1334, where 720 are males and 614 are females. The village is administrated by Gram Panchayat. This village is located at the Budaun dataganj road.
