= Bhasrala =

Village in Budaun, Uttar Pradesh

- village
- Location in Uttar Pradesh, India Bhasrala (India)
- Coordinates: 28.01°N 79.17°E
- Country: India
- State: Uttar Pradesh
- District: Badaun

Government
  - Body: Gram panchayat

Languages
  - Official: Hindi
- Time zone: UTC+5:30 (IST)
- PIN: 243601
- Vehicle registration: UP 24

Bhasrala is a village in Jagat Tehsil, Budaun district, Uttar Pradesh, India. The Budaun railway station is located at the distance of 14 kilometer from the village. Hindi and Urdu are the main communication languages in the village. The village is administrated by Gram Panchayat.
