= Maujampur =

Village in Budaun, Uttar Pradesh

- village
- Location in Uttar Pradesh, India Maujampur (India)
- Coordinates: 28.34°N 78.92°E
- Country: India
- State: Uttar Pradesh
- District: Badaun

Government
  - Body: Gram panchayat

Population (2011 Census of India)
  - Total: 1,696

Languages
  - Official: Hindi
- Time zone: UTC+5:30 (IST)
- PIN: 243601
- Vehicle registration: UP 24

Maujampur is a village in Jagat block, Budaun district, Uttar Pradesh, India. The village is administrated by Gram Panchayat.
