= Bangavan =

Village in Budaun, Uttar Pradesh

- village
- Location in Uttar Pradesh, India Bangavan (India)
- Coordinates: 27.97°N 79.05°E
- Country: India
- State: Uttar Pradesh
- District: Badaun

Government
  - Body: Gram panchayat

Population (2011 Census of India)
  - Total: 857

Languages
  - Official: Hindi
- Time zone: UTC+5:30 (IST)
- PIN: 243601
- Vehicle registration: UP 24

Bangavan is a village in Salarpur block, Budaun district, Uttar Pradesh, India. Its village code is 128500. As per the report of 2011 Census of India, The total population of the village is 857, where 454 are males and 403 are females. The village is administrated by Gram Panchayat.
