= Bhajpura =

Village in Budaun, Uttar Pradesh

- village
- Location in Uttar Pradesh, India Bhajpura (India)
- Coordinates: 28.06°N 79.10°E
- Country: India
- State: Uttar Pradesh
- District: Badaun

Government
  - Body: gram panchayat

Population (2011 Census of India)
  - Total: 460

Languages
  - Official: Hindi
- Time zone: UTC+5:30 (IST)
- PIN: 243601
- Vehicle registration: UP 24

Bhajpura is a village and gram panchayat in Salarpur block, Budaun district, Uttar Pradesh, India. Its village code is 128326. According to 2011 Census of India, the total population of the village is 460 out of 233 are males and 227 are females.
