= Samrer =

- Block
- Location in Uttar Pradesh, India Samrer (India)
- Coordinates: 28.09°N 79.41°E
- Country: India
- State: Uttar Pradesh
- District: Badaun

Government
  - Body: Gram panchayat

Population (2011 Census of India)
  - Total: 135,724

Languages
  - Official: Hindi
- Time zone: UTC+5:30 (IST)
- PIN: 243635
- Vehicle registration: UP 24

Samrer is a Block and village panchayat in Budaun district, Uttar Pradesh, India. 0184 is the block number of Samrer. There are 98 Villages under Samrer block. According to 2011 Census of India, total population is 1,35,724 out of 73,829 are males and are 61,895 females.
