= Badal, Uttar Pradesh =

Village in Budaun, Uttar Pradesh

Badal
- village
- Location in Uttar Pradesh, India Badal (India)
- Coordinates: 28.13°N 79.13°E
- Country: India
- State: Uttar Pradesh
- District: Badaun

Government
  - Body: Gram panchayat

Population (2011 Census of India)
  - Total: 1,121

Languages
  - Official: Hindi
- Time zone: UTC+5:30 (IST)
- PIN: 243601
- Vehicle registration: UP 24

Badal is a village in Salarpur block, Budaun district, Uttar Pradesh, India. Its village code is 128313. As per the report of 2011 Census of India, The total population of the village is 1121, where 627 are males and 494 are females. The village is administrated by Gram Panchayat.
