= Kusaina =

Village in Budaun, Uttar Pradesh

- village
- Location in Uttar Pradesh, India Kusaina (India)
- Coordinates: 28.19°N 79.22°E
- Country: India
- State: Uttar Pradesh
- District: Badaun

Government
  - Body: Gram panchayat

Population (2011 Census of India)
  - Total: 743

Languages
  - Official: Hindi
- Time zone: UTC+5:30 (IST)
- PIN: 243601
- Vehicle registration: UP 24

Kusaina is a village in Salarpur block, Budaun district, Uttar Pradesh, India. The village is administrated by Titauli Gram panchayat. The village code is 128264. According to 2011 Census of India, the total population of the village is 743, out of 386 are males and 357 are females.
