= Bastara =

Village in Budaun, Uttar Pradesh

- village
- Location in Uttar Pradesh, India Bastara (India)
- Coordinates: 28.06°N 79.09°E
- Country: India
- State: Uttar Pradesh
- District: Badaun

Government
  - Body: Gram panchayat

Population (2011 Census of India)
  - Total: 810

Languages
  - Official: Hindi
- Time zone: UTC+5:30 (IST)
- PIN: 243601
- Vehicle registration: UP 24

Bastara is a village in Ujhani block, Budaun district, Uttar Pradesh, India. According to 2011 Census of India, the total population of the village is 810, out of 429 are males and 381 are females. Its village code is 128475.
