= Barate Gadar =

Village in Budaun, Uttar Pradesh

Barategadar
- village
- Location in Uttar Pradesh, India Barategadar (India)
- Coordinates: 28.11°N 79.08°E
- Country: India
- State: Uttar Pradesh
- District: Badaun

Government
  - Body: Gram panchayat

Population (2011 Census of India)
  - Total: 2,620

Languages
  - Official: Hindi
- Time zone: UTC+5:30 (IST)
- PIN: 243601
- Vehicle registration: UP 24

Barate Gadar is a village and gram panchayat in Salarpur block, Budaun district, Uttar Pradesh, India. Its village code is 128235. According to 2011 Census of India, the total population of the village is 2,620 out of 1,422 are males and 1,198 are females.
