= Dhakia =

Village in Budaun, Uttar Pradesh

- village
- Location in Uttar Pradesh, India Dhakia (India)
- Coordinates: 28.12°N 79.09°E
- Country: India
- State: Uttar Pradesh
- District: Badaun

Government
  - Body: Gram panchayat

Population (2011 Census of India)
  - Total: 1,172

Languages
  - Official: Hindi
- Time zone: UTC+5:30 (IST)
- PIN: 243726
- Vehicle registration: UP 24

Dhakia is a village in Salarpur block, Budaun district, Uttar Pradesh, India. Its village code is 128277. Ghatpuri railway station is 7 km (4.3 mi) from the village. Per the 2011 Census of India, the total population of the village is 1479: 802 males and 677 females. The village is administrated by Gram Panchayat.
