= Rajpura, Budaun =

Rajpura
- Block
- Location in Uttar Pradesh, India Rajpura (India)
- Coordinates: 27.89°N 79.42°E
- Country: India
- State: Uttar Pradesh
- District: Badaun

Government
  - Body: Gram panchayat

Population (2011 Census of India)
  - Total: 1,752

Languages
  - Official: Hindi
- Time zone: UTC+5:30 (IST)
- PIN: 243635
- Vehicle registration: UP 24

Rajpura is a Block and village panchayat in Budaun district, Uttar Pradesh, India. 0170 is the block number of Rajpura. There are 118 Villages under Rajpura block. According to 2011 Census of India, total number of houses in Asafpur is 28,395 and total population is 186453 out of 99,551 are males and are 86,902 females.
