= Achaura =

Village in Budaun, Uttar Pradesh

Achaura Achora
- village
- Location in Uttar Pradesh, India Achaura (India)
- Coordinates: 27.977956°N 79.005269°E
- Country: India
- State: Uttar Pradesh
- District: Badaun

Government
  - Body: Gram Panchayat

Population (2011 Census of India)
  - Total: 2,646

Languages
  - Official: Hindi
- Time zone: UTC+5:30 (IST)
- Postal code: 243639
- Vehicle registration: UP 24

Achaura is a village in Ujhani Tehsil and Budaun district, Uttar Pradesh, India. It is 2 km away from Ujhani railway station. The village is administrated by Gram Panchayat. Its village code is 128518.

== Connectivity ==
- Ujhani railway station
- Public Bus Stand
- Private Bus Stand
