= Dahgawan =

Dahgawan Dahgavan
- Town
- Location in Uttar Pradesh, India
- Coordinates: 28.13°N 78.62°E
- Country: India
- State: Uttar Pradesh
- District: Badaun

Population (2011)
  - Total: 10,328

Languages
  - Official: Hindi
- Time zone: UTC+5:30 (IST)
- PIN: 243638
- Vehicle registration: UP 24

Dahgawan is a Block and a nagar panchayat in Dahgawan block, Badaun District in the Indian state of Uttar Pradesh. It is a business hub providing industrial goods from across the country to rural villages. The name originated from ten small villages/parts, namely Khagi Nagala, Kasai Nagala, three Yadav tolas/bakhris, Baniya basti, Murab basti, Luhar basti, Jatav Mohalla, Harijan tola.

New bastis are emerging.

Dahgawan is the birthplace of 3 UP MLAs. This place is under-developed educationally and culturally. It is located 58 km (36 mi) from Badaun railway station.
