= Budhvayee =

Village in Budaun, Uttar Pradesh

- village
- Location in Uttar Pradesh, India Budhvayee (India)
- Coordinates: 28.006767°N 79.178867°E
- Country: India
- State: Uttar Pradesh
- District: Badaun

Government
  - Body: Gram panchayat

Languages
  - Official: Hindi
- Time zone: UTC+5:30 (IST)
- PIN: 243601
- Vehicle registration: UP 24

Budhvayee is a village in Jagat Tehsil, Budaun district, Uttar Pradesh, India. The Budaun railway station is located at the distance of 4 kilometer from the village. Its village code is 128384. The village is administrated by Gram Panchayat.
