= Junawai =

- Town, Tehsil
- Location in Uttar Pradesh, India Junawai (India)
- Coordinates: 28.19°N 78.50°E
- Country: India
- State: Uttar Pradesh
- District: Badaun

Government
  - Body: Gram panchayat

Population (2011 Census of India)
  - Total: 1,752

Languages
  - Official: Hindi
- Time zone: UTC+5:30 (IST)
- PIN: 243722
- Vehicle registration: UP 24

Junawai is a Block and village panchayat in Budaun district, Uttar Pradesh, India. Its block code is 0172. There are 75 Villages under Junawai Block. Junawai is also a village under Junawai block.
