= Haluan (newspaper) =

Indonesian daily newspaper published in Padang

- Mencerdaskan Kehidupan Masyarakat (Educate the People's Lives)
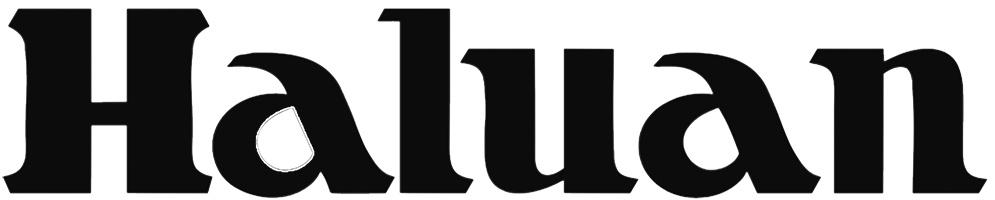
- Type: Daily newspaper
- Format: Broadsheet
- Owner: Haluan Media Group (Basko Group)
- Founder: H. Kasoema
- Founded: October 1, 1948; 77 years ago
- Ceased publication: April 17, 1958
- Relaunched: May 1, 1969
- Headquarters: Tabing Airport Complex; Jl. Prof. Hamka, Padang
- City: Padang
- Country: Indonesia
- ISSN: 0852-6508
- OCLC number: 838658509
- Website: www.harianhaluan.com haluan.co (news portal)

Haluan (Guide or The Guide, full nameplate Harian Umum Haluan [The Guide General Daily]) is a daily newspaper in Indonesia published in Padang, West Sumatra. Published since 1948, the paper is one of the oldest continuously published newspapers in Indonesia.

Haluan is owned by Haluan Media Group, a group comprising another local newspapers Haluan Riau and Haluan Kepri and several online news portals (including separated portal Haluan.co), as well as creative houses. The group is part of the larger Basko Group, led by conglomerate Basrizal Koto.

== History ==
Haluan first published in 1948 in the midst of Indonesian National Revolution, however the exact date is unclear. According to a Haluan.co article, one version said it was first published on October 1, other versions said in either April or May, but October 1 is considered the accepted date. The paper was founded by H. Kasoema, a former journalist for Demokrasi in Padang Panjang. This newspaper was first published in Bukittinggi, the capital of newly established Central Sumatra province, and was led by Darwis Abbas. In 1949 Haluan office was moved to Padang.

In December 1951, Haluan published a controversial opinion from M.A Dt. Bungsu of People's Heritage Party (Indonesian: Partai Adat Rakyat), challenging the old Minangkabau principles Adaik Basandi Syarak (Minangkabau for "adat based on sharia"). Bungsu writing sparking arguments through ten opinions from six authors which were published in the daily during December 1951 to January 1952.

Haluan ceased publication started from April 17, 1958, when PRRI revolt is ongoing. The daily was only published again on May 1, 1969, under PT Ranah Indah.

During the New Order, Haluan was being warned by the government for a writing about PDRI history. Despite the critical stance, Haluan expanded significantly; its circulation had reached all parts of West Sumatra, as well as neighboring province Riau, Jambi, Bengkulu and even Jakarta. However, in the late 1990s (especially on 1997 crisis and the Reform era) the paper's market share decreased from 5.8 million in 1997 to 5.4 million in 2001.

On October 1, 2010, Haluan ownership was transferred from H. Kasoema's family to Basrizal Koto-owned Basko Group, through PT Haluan Sumbar Mandiri. Koto stated that the transfer was done with missions "to save the history and great names of this newspaper", due to the continuing revenue loss of the paper and competing difficulties with other newspapers in the post-1997 crisis.
