= Mion, Budaun =

Miaun Miaun/ Myaun
- Block
- Miaoon
- Nickname: Myai
- Location in Uttar Pradesh, India Miaun (India)
- Coordinates: 27.89°N 79.42°E
- State: Uttar Pradesh
- District: Badaun

Government
  - Body: Gram panchayat

Population (2011 Census of India)
  - Total: 157,657

Languages
  - Official: Hindi
- Time zone: UTC+5:30 (IST)
- PIN: 243631
- Vehicle registration: UP 24

Mion (Miaun/myaun) is a Block and village panchayat in Budaun district, Uttar Pradesh, India. 0186 is the block number of Mion. There are 115 Villages under Mion block. According to 2011 Census of India, total population is 157657 out of 84983 are males and are 72674 females.
