= Rustamnagar Sahaspur =

- Census town
- Location in Uttar Pradesh, India Rustamnagar Sahaspur (India)
- Coordinates: 28°36′35″N 78°47′48″E
- Country: India
- State: Uttar Pradesh
- District: Moradabad
- Elevation: 4,556 m (14,948 ft)

Population (2001)
  - Total: 14,198

Languages
  - Official: Hindi
- Time zone: UTC+5:30 (IST)
- Vehicle registration: UP
- Website: up.gov.in

Rustamnagar Sahaspur is a census town in Moradabad district in the Indian state of Uttar Pradesh.

== Demographics ==
As of 2001 India census, Rustamnagar Sahaspur had a population of 14,198. Males constitute 53% of the population and females 47%. Rustamnagar Sahaspur has an average literacy rate of 71%, lower than the national average of 59.5%: male literacy is 79%, and female literacy is 62%. In Rustamnagar Sahaspur, 20% of the population is under 6 years of age.
