= Peter Kurau =

W. Peter Kurau is the Professor of Horn and Chamber Music at the Eastman School of Music as well as the Principal Horn of the Rochester Philharmonic Orchestra. He currently resides in Honeoye Falls, New York, with his wife, soprano singer Pamela Kurau.

== Background ==
Professor Kurau came from a musical background. His mother was a soprano singer and his father was an organist. He would often observe them rehearsing in his childhood home, preparing for church.

== Performing career ==
Kurau is an active soloist performing with many professional orchestras and ensembles. He has appeared in such events as the 2008 International Horn Society convention, the College Music Society convention, the Music Educators' National Conference, and the Music Teachers' National Association convention, as well as many others.

When his teacher Verne Reynolds, a charter member and founder of the Eastman Brass, retired in 1990, Kurau became his successor.

Peter Kurau first joined the Rochester Philharmonic Orchestra as Assistant Principal Horn (1983–1995), and was appointed Principal Horn in 2004.

In 1991, he was the first soloist to perform as a recently discovered and reconstructed version of Mozart's Rondo, K. 371 for horn and orchestra.

== Education and teaching career ==
He received his formal education at the Eastman School of Music, the Guildhall School of Music and Drama, Royal College of Music, University of Connecticut, and Florida State University, where his principal teachers were Verne Reynolds, David Cripps, and William Capps.

Since 1995, he has served as Associate Professor of Horn at the Eastman School of Music, where he also performs as the director of the Eastman Horn Choir.

He often commissions and premiers new works for horn, such as compositions by important composers such as Verne Reynolds, John Cheetham, and James Willey.

He previously served on the faculties of the University of Missouri-Columbia, SUNY-Geneseo, Roberts Wesleyan College, Houghton College and Nazareth College
