= Balliya =

Village in Budaun, Uttar Pradesh

- village
- Location in Uttar Pradesh, India Balliya (India)
- Coordinates: 28.12°N 79.10°E
- Country: India
- State: Uttar Pradesh
- District: Badaun

Government
  - Body: Gram panchayat

Population (2011 Census of India)
  - Total: 1,666

Languages
  - Official: Hindi
- Time zone: UTC+5:30 (IST)
- PIN: 243601
- Vehicle registration: UP 24

Balliya is a village and gram panchayat in Salarpur block, Budaun district, Uttar Pradesh, India. Its village code is 128240. According to 2011 Census of India, the total population of the village is 1,666 out of 896 are males and 770 are females.
