= Asafpur =

- Block
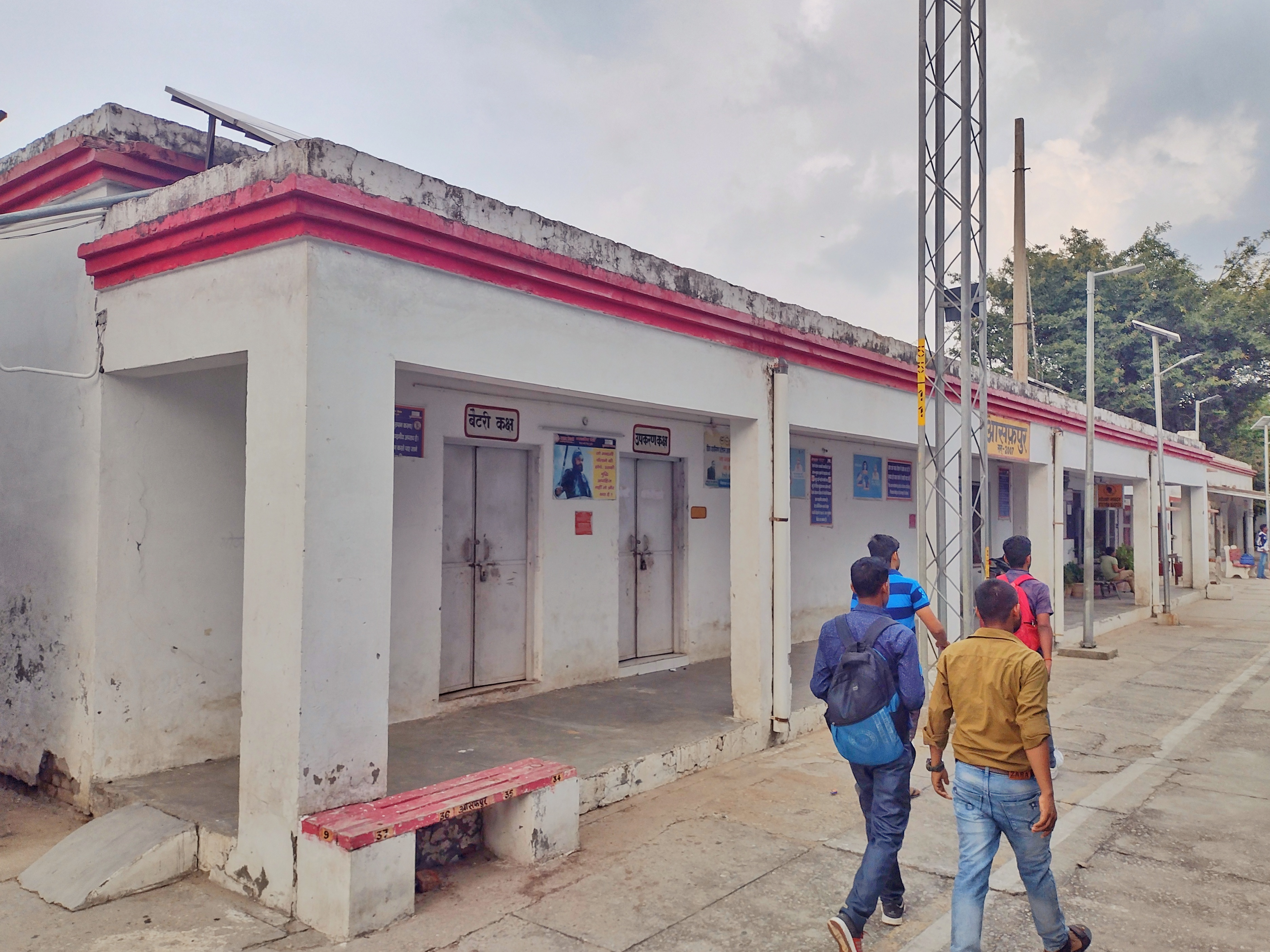
- Asafpur railway station

- Location in Uttar Pradesh, India Asafpur (India)
- Coordinates: 27.89°N 79.42°E
- Country: Badaun India
- State: Uttar Pradesh
- District: Badaun

Government
  - Body: Gram panchayat (Kasba)

Population (2011 Census of India)
  - Total: 173,601

Languages
  - Official: Hindi
- Time zone: UTC+5:30 (IST)
- PIN: 243632
- Vehicle registration: UP 24

Asafpur is a block and village panchayat (Kasba) in Budaun district, Uttar Pradesh, India. Its Community Development (CD) block number is 0173. There are 84 villages under Asafpur block.

== Demographics ==
According to 2011 Census of India, the total number of houses in Asafpur is 28,395. Asafpur's total population is 173,601, of which 92,682 are males 80,919 are female.

A total of 52.01% of Asafpur's population are illiterate, of which 63.29% of males and 39.01% of females are literate. These literacy rates are average for the Bundaun district

A total of 32% of Asafpur's population are workers. The majority work in cultivation (54.5%) or agriculture (26.89%).
