= Ambiapur =

- Block
- Location in Uttar Pradesh, India Ambiapur (India)
- Coordinates: 28.21°N 78.68°E
- Country: India
- State: Uttar Pradesh
- District: Badaun

Government
  - Body: Gram panchayat

Population (2011 Census of India)
  - Total: 185,007

Languages
  - Official: Hindi
- Time zone: UTC+5:30 (IST)
- PIN: 243723
- Vehicle registration: UP 24

Ambiapur is a Block and village panchayat in Budaun district, Uttar Pradesh, India. The block number of Ambiapur is 178. There are 89 villages in Ambiapur block. According to 2011 Census of India, the total population is 185007. Out of this, 98605 are males and 86402 are females.

== Villages under Ambiapur block ==
- Akauli
- Ambiapur
- Angaul
- Badrauni
- Badshahpur
- Bagarpur Sagarpur
- Bain
- Bairmai Khurd
- Bamed
- Banbehta
- Bansbaraulia
- Baramai Buzurg
- Barnidhakpur
- Barnighat
- Basawanpur
- Behtagusain
- Behtajabi
- Bhatri Govardhanpur
- Bhikampur Hardopatti
- Bichaula
- Chholayan
- Dabihari
- Dhadoomar
- Dhanauli
- Din Nagar Sheikhpur
- Dudhani
- Faqirabad
- Fateh Nagla
- Fatehullaha Ganj
- Garhauli
- Garhi
- Gatarpur
- Gudhni
- Haidalpur
- Haivatpur
- Hardaspur
- Harganpur
- Hasupur Baheriya
- Jahanabad
- Jarawan
- Jarsaini
- Jinaura
- Karanpur
- Katinna
- Khairati Nagar
- Khairi
- Khausara
- Kherha
- Khulet
- Kurdarni
- Mirzapur Shohra
- Mohammadganj
- Mooseypur
- Mustafabad Tappa Ahamadnagar
- Nagarjhoona
- Nagla Dallu
- Nagla Tarau
- Naipindari
- Nizampur
- Oya
- Paharpur
- Palpur
- Pindaul
- Pusgawan
- Raipur Buzurg
- Rampur Mazra
- Rampur Tanda
- Risauli
- Rudeina Ghangholi
- Rujhan
- Sabdalpur
- Sadarpur
- Sahaspur
- Sateti Patti Choora
- Sateti Patti Inchha
- Sateti Patti Sukhat
- Satetipatti Gaja
- Serasaulpatti Kunwarsahai
- Shahbazpur
- Shahzadnagar
- Siddhpur Chitrasen
- Simribhojpur
- Sirasaul Patti Seetaram
- Sirasaulpatti Jasa
- Sirtaul
- Sundar Nagar
- Surajpur
- Tigora Isapur
- Ulikhya
