= Uttar Pradesh Gramin Bank =

Regional Rural Bank in Uttar Pradesh, India

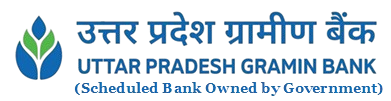
- आपकी उन्नति, हमारा लक्ष्य

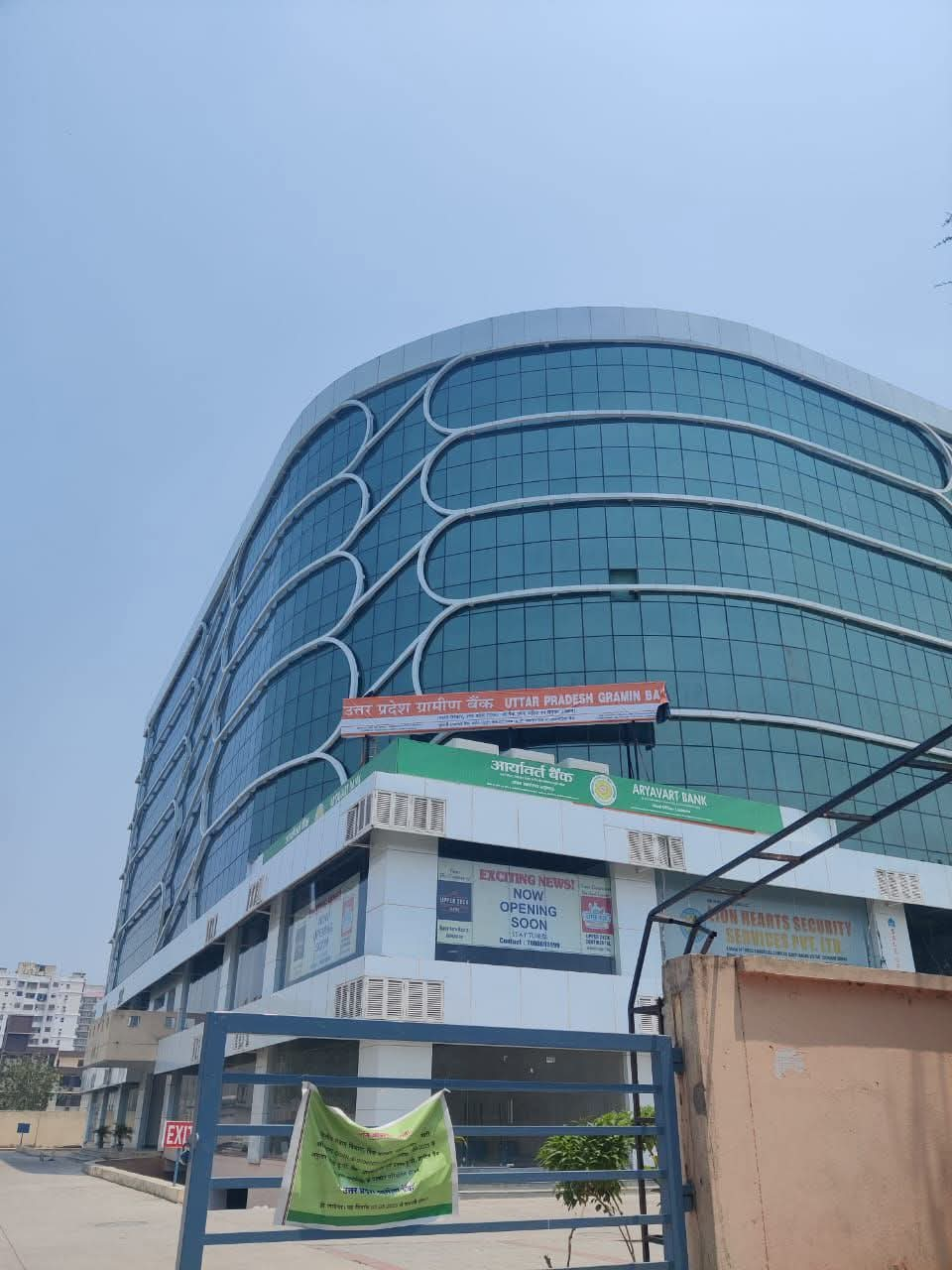
- Uttar Pradesh Gramin Bank Headquarter Lucknow
- Native name: उत्तर प्रदेश ग्रामीण बैंक
- Type: Regional Rural Bank
- Industry: Financial services Banking
- Predecessor: Aryavart Bank, Baroda UP Bank, Prathama UP Gramin Bank
- Founded: 1 May 2025; 16 months ago
- Headquarters: 2nd and 3rd floor, NBCC Commercial Complex, Vardan Khand, Gomti Nagar Extension, Lucknow - 226010 Uttar Pradesh, India
- Number of locations: 4330 Branches
- Area served: Uttar Pradesh
- Key people: Shri Yadav S. Thakur (Chairman)
- Products: Retail banking; Corporate banking; Mortgage loans; Private banking; Insurance
- Services: Financial services; Banking
- Owner: Government of India (50%); Government of Uttar Pradesh (15%); Bank of Baroda (35%)
- Number of employees: 19600+
- Parent: Ministry of Finance, Government of India
- Website: upgb.bank.in

The Uttar Pradesh Gramin Bank (UPGB) is an Indian regional rural bank in Uttar Pradesh established on 1 May 2025. The bank was formed by the amalgamation of Aryavart Bank, Baroda UP Bank and Prathama UP Gramin Bank under The "One State, One RRB" policy of government. It currently has 4330 branches in rural areas of all 75 Districts of Uttar Pradesh.

It functions under Regional Rural Banks' Act 1976 and is sponsored by Bank of Baroda.

== History ==
=== Aryavart Bank ===
Allahabad UP Gramin Bank and Gramin Bank of Aryavart were merged, and renamed as Aryavart Bank e.r.f 01.04.2019, under the sponsorship of Bank of India. The bank had 1365 branches and 22 regional offices at the time of amalgamation in 26 districts of Uttar Pradesh.

The Head Office of Aryavart Bank was located at A-2/46, Vijay Khand, Gomti Nagar, Lucknow, which later on 01.04.2025 relocated to its new premise; 2nd and 3rd floor, NBCC Commercial Complex, Vardan Khand, Gomti Nagar Extension, Lucknow, Uttar Pradesh, 226010. Shortly before the official merger date.

=== Baroda UP Bank ===
The RRBs were established in India under RRB Act 1976 [23(1)]. As per Govt of India notification no 3837 dated 26.11.2019, Baroda Uttar Pradesh Gramin Bank, Purvanchal Bank and Kashi Gomti Samyut Gramin Bank has been amalgamated to form Baroda U.P. Bank under the sponsorship of Bank of Baroda.

=== Prathama UP Gramin Bank ===
Prathama Bank and Sarva UP Gramin Bank merged with name Prathama UP Gramin Bank.The bank had 960 branches around 19 districts of Uttar Pradesh; it also had one branch in Haridwar District of Uttarakhand.The bank was sponsored by the Punjab National Bank.

Prathama Bank (lit. First Bank) was established in 1975 by Syndicate Bank. It was the first RRB in India.

== See also ==
- Regional rural bank
- List of banks in India
- Public sector banks in India
- Banking in India
- Reserve Bank of India
- Indian Financial System Code
- Make in India
- List of largest banks
- List of companies of India
