= Shikrapur, Budaun =

Village in Budaun, Uttar Pradesh

Shikrapur
- Village
- Location in Uttar Pradesh, India Shikrapur (India)
- Coordinates: 28.08°N 79.12°E
- Country: India
- State: Uttar Pradesh
- District: Badaun

Government
  - Body: Gram panchayat

Population (2011 Census of India)
  - Total: 1,302

Languages
  - Official: Hindi
- Time zone: UTC+5:30 (IST)
- PIN: 243724
- Vehicle registration: UP 24

Shikrapur is a village and gram panchayat in Salarpur block, Budaun district, Uttar Pradesh, India. According to 2011 Census of India, the total village population is 1,302, out of 704 are males and 598 are females. Its village code is 128328. Budaun railway station is 6 km away from the village.
