= Yusuf Nagar =

- Village
- Location in Uttar Pradesh, India Yusuf Nagar (India)
- Coordinates: 28.18°N 79.17°E
- Country: India
- State: Uttar Pradesh
- District: Budaun district

Population
  - Total: 2,637

Languages
  - Official: Urdu and Hindi
- Time zone: UTC+5:30 (IST)
- PIN: 243601

Yusuf Nagar a village in Salarpur block, Budaun district of Uttar Pradesh, India. Yusuf Nagar village is also a gram panchayat. It is located 20 km away from Budaun, which is a district, as well as sub-district, headquarter of Yusuf Nagar village.

== Demographics ==
The total population of Yusuf Nagar is 2,637 of which 1,422 are males while 1,215 are females as per Population Census 2011.

== See also ==
- List of villages in India
- Budaun district
