= Jagat, Budaun =

Jagat
- Block, Nagar panchayat
- Location in Uttar Pradesh, India
- Coordinates: 27.96°N 79.24°E
- Country: India
- State: Uttar Pradesh
- District: Badaun

Population (2011 Census of India)
  - Total: 7,787

Languages
  - Official: Hindi
- Time zone: UTC+5:30 (IST)
- PIN: 243601
- Vehicle registration: UP 24

Jagat is a Block and Nagar panchayat in Budaun Tehsil and Budaun district, Uttar Pradesh, India. Its block code is 0181. According to 2011 Census of India the total population of the town is 7,787, out of which 4,112 are males and 3,675 are females.
