= Wazirganj =

- Town
- Location in Uttar Pradesh, India
- Coordinates: 28.22°N 79.05°E
- Country: India
- State: Uttar Pradesh
- District: Budaun

Government
  - Body: Bisauli Municipal corporation
  - MLA: Ashutosh Maurya

Area
  - Total: 4 km^{2} (1.5 sq mi)
- Elevation: 174 m (571 ft)

Population (2011)
  - Total: 32,780
  - Density: 8,200/km^{2} (21,000/sq mi)

ब्रजभाषा
  - Official: Hindi, Urdu & English
- Time zone: UTC+5:30 (IST)
- Postal code: 243726
- Vehicle registration: UP-24
- Website: up.gov.in.

Wazirganj (Hindi: वज़ीरगंज, Urdu: وزیر گنج) is a town and a nagar panchayat in Budaun District in the Indian state of Uttar Pradesh.

== Geography ==
Wazirganj is a historical place from time of *Alha, Udal* This is the oldest temple of Khere Wali Maiya, where Alha and Udal had arrived. Wazirganj is located at 28.22°N 79.05°E. It has an average elevation of 174 metres (570 feet).

== Demographics ==
As of 2001 India census, Wazirganj had a population of 17,452. Males constitute 54% of the population and females 46%. Wazirganj has an average literacy rate of 42%, lower than the national average of 59.5%: male literacy is 51%, and female literacy is 32%. In Wazirganj, 19% of the population is under 6 years of age.
