= Dahemi =

- village
- Location in Uttar Pradesh, India Dahemi (India)
- Coordinates: 28.085539636684°N 79.09953086834°E
- Country: India
- State: Uttar Pradesh
- District: Badaun

Government
  - Body: Gram panchayat

Population (2011 Census of India)
  - Total: 1,961

Languages
  - Official: Hindi
- Time zone: UTC+5:30 (IST)
- Postal code: 243601

Dahemi is a village in Salarpur Tehsil, Budaun district, Uttar Pradesh, India. Dahemi village is administered by Sarpanch who is elected by people of a village. Hindi is the speaking languages in this village.

Dahemi is 8 kilometers away from Badaun City. The total geographical area of this village is 411.29 hectares. An ancient temple dedicated to Shiva is located in the village.
