= Luigi Mion =

Italian painter

Luigi Mion (Cattaro, Dalmatia, June 15, 1843 – Venice, Italy, November 20, 1908) was an Italian painter, active mainly in Venice painting genre subjects.

== Biography ==
He was born in Kotor, Montenegro, at that time part of Austria-Hungary, to Guiseppe Mion and Maria Bogdanović, then moved to Treviso, Venice, married in 1895 Ida Leis Leimburg, and had a son, Guido Mion with first wife Maria Ferro. Active in Venice. His main works are: Troppo tardi, exhibited in 1872; Mosca cieca, exhibited at the 1878 Universal Exhibition of Paris; Sbagliato, in 1879 at Monaco; La maschera veneziana exhibited at the Salon of 1879; Farfallina; Religione dello Famiglia; Le orfanelli; and Mamma mia. To Venice, in 1887, he displayed: Il Mattino; After the messa; Ai Vesperi; and In San Marco. The latter represent a realistic indoor vedute. he also painted Ragazza all Finestra now located in the civic library of Vercelli.
