= Titauli =

Village in Budaun, Uttar Pradesh

- village
- Location in Uttar Pradesh, India Titauli (India)
- Coordinates: 28.20°N 78.84°E
- Country: India
- State: Uttar Pradesh
- District: Badaun

Government
  - Body: Gram panchayat

Population (2011 Census of India)
  - Total: 743

Languages
  - Official: Hindi
- Time zone: UTC+5:30 (IST)
- PIN: 243724
- Vehicle registration: UP 24

Titauli is a village in Post Office - Ughaiti, Sub-District Bilsi,Sahaswan block, Budaun district, Uttar Pradesh, India. The village is administrated by Gram panchayat. Its village code is 128265. According to 2011 Census of India, the total population of the village is 1,749, out of 955 are males and 794 are females.
