= Kadar Chowk =

Block in Uttar Pradesh

- Block, Nagar panchayat
- Location in Uttar Pradesh, India
- Coordinates: 27.86°N 79.08°E
- Country: India
- State: Uttar Pradesh
- District: Badaun

Population (2011)
  - Total: 6,515

Languages
  - Official: Hindi
- Time zone: UTC+5:30 (IST)
- PIN: 243601
- Vehicle registration: UP 24

Kadar Chowk is an administrative Block and Nagar panchayat in Budaun Tehsil and Budaun district, Uttar Pradesh, India. Its block code is 0183. The village is administrated by Gram Panchayat. According to Census 2011 India the total population is 1,66,578 out of 89,303 are males and 77,275 are females.
