= Ujhani =

- City
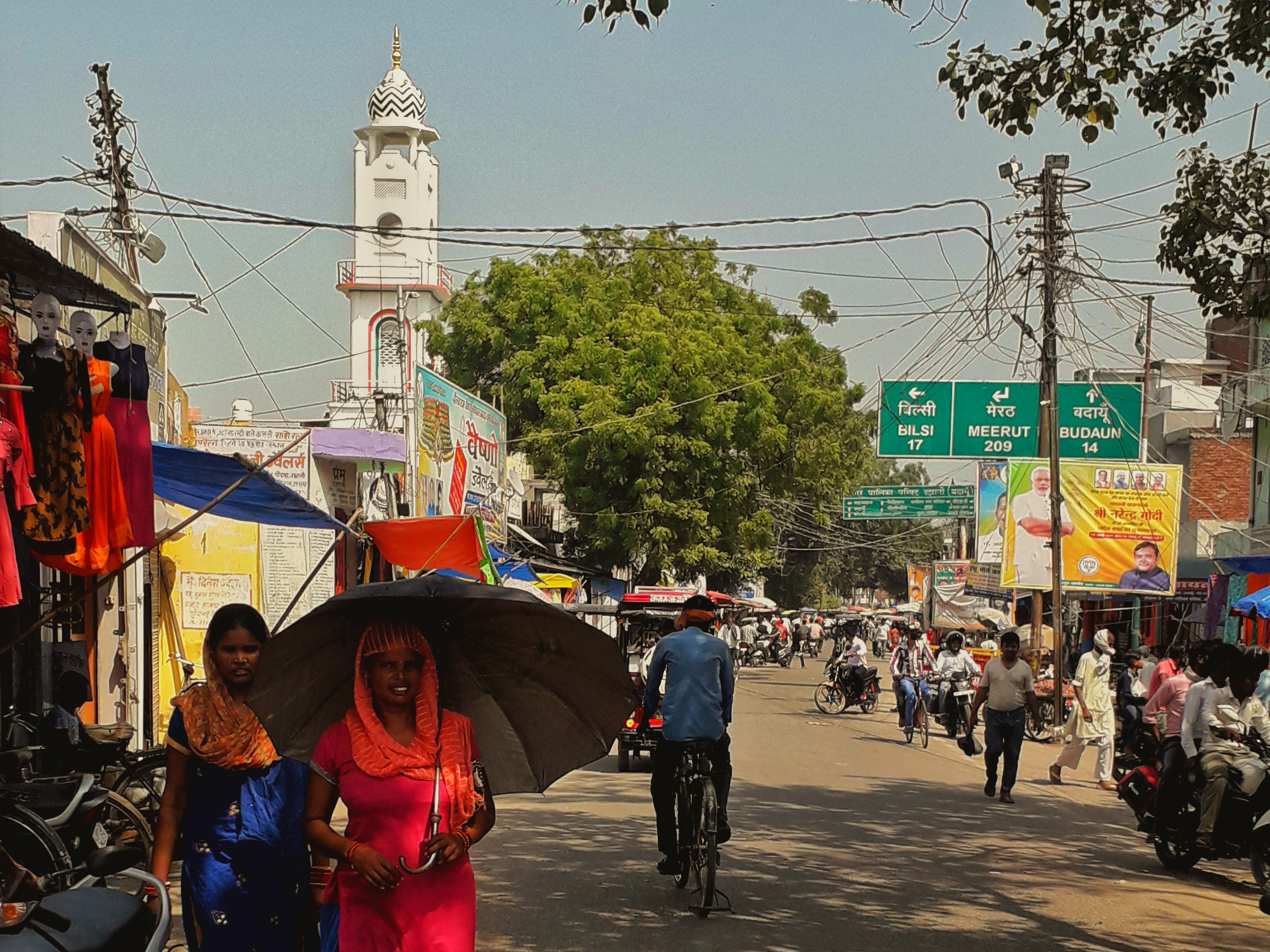
- Bareilly Road, Ujhani

- Location in Uttar Pradesh, India
- Coordinates: 28.35°N 79.02°E
- Country: India
- State: Uttar Pradesh
- District: Badaun

Area
  - Total: 48 km^{2} (19 sq mi)
- Elevation: 192 m (630 ft)

Population (2011)
  - Total: 125,039
  - Density: 2,600/km^{2} (6,700/sq mi)
- Demonym: metric

Languages
  - Official: Hindi
- Time zone: UTC+5:30 (IST)
- PIN: 243639
- Telephone code: 05832
- Vehicle registration: UP-24

Ujhani is an industry-based city and a municipal board in Badaun district in the Indian state of Uttar Pradesh.

== Geography ==
Ujhani is located at 28.02°N 79.02°E. It has an average elevation of 192 metres (630 feet).

== Demographics ==
As of 2011 India census, Ujhani had a population of near about 126,000. Males constitute 56% of the population and females 44%. Ujhani has an average literacy rate of 87%, higher than the national average of 74%: male literacy is 88%, and female literacy is 86%. In Ujhani, 15% of the population is under 6 years of age. The area of Ujhani Municipal Council is 48 km^{2} (19 sq mi).

Religions in Ujhani (2011)
Religion	Percent
Hindus	58.50%
Muslims	37%
Sikh	2.5%
Christian	1.5%
Jains	0.5%
Others†	1%
Distribution of religions

== Location ==
- Ujhani lies on SH33 (Bareilly-Mathura)
- SH18 originates from here, known as Budaun-Meerut or Budaun-Delhi Highway.
- The Uttarakhand border is 155 km (96 mi) to the north and the Himalayan ranges start from about 188 km (117 mi) from here.

== Politics ==
Bilsi (Assembly constituency) is the Vidhan Sabha constituency. Badaun Lok Sabha constituency is the parliamentary constituency. The Chairman Of Ujhani is Poonam Agarwal from BJP won by overwhelming majority.

== Education ==
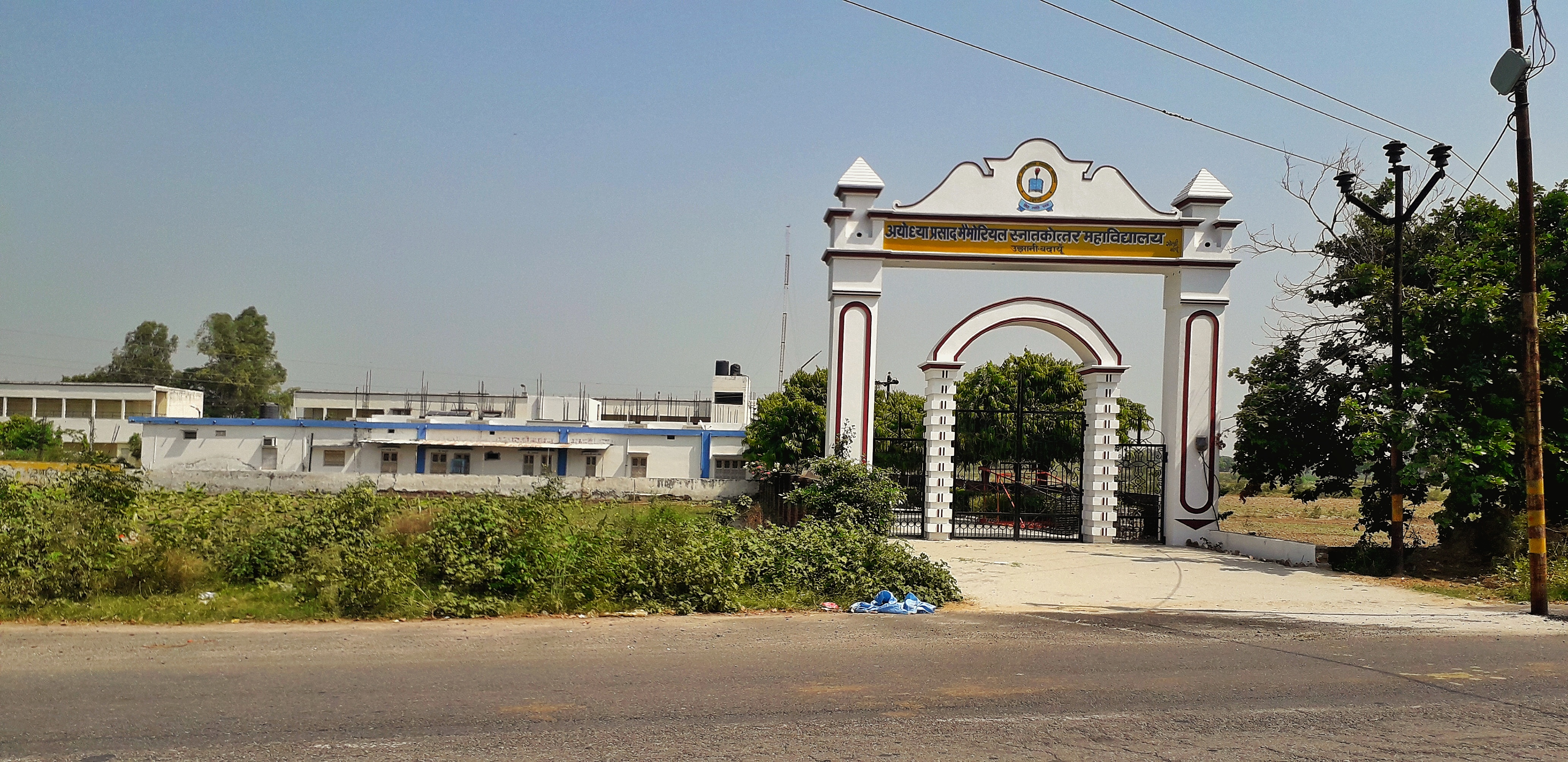
Ayodhya Prasad Memorial PG College, Ujhani

Ujhani is a small town connected to many rural areas. Many children from the villages come here to get education. In recent times, with great emphasis on education, there have been many schools and colleges established here.

== Distance ==
- Budaun (city) - 6 km (3.7 mi), 11 km (6.8 mi) (centre)
- Kasganj 45 km (28 mi)
- Bareilly 65 km (40 mi)
- Mathura 145 km (90 mi)
- Delhi 199 km (124 mi)

== See also ==
- Bitroi
