= Budaun railway station =

Railway Station in Uttar Pradesh

Budaun junction
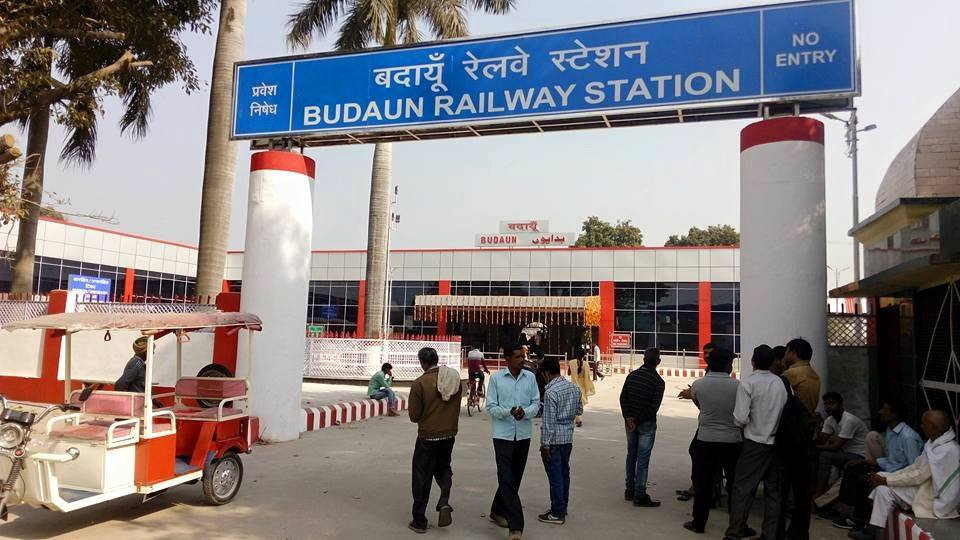
- Budaun junction main entrance

General information
- Location: Badaun, Uttar Pradesh; India
- Coordinates: 28.0279°N 79.1362°E
- Elevation: 174 metres (571 ft)
- System: Indian Railways station
- Owner: Indian Railways
- Operator: North Eastern Railway
- Line: Bareilly-Kasganj Rail line
- Platforms: 5
- Tracks: 4
- Connections: Auto stand, rickshaw

Construction
- Structure type: At grade
- Parking: Yes
- Cycle facilities: Yes

Other information
- Status: Active
- Station code: BEM
- Zone(s): Northern Eastern Railway
- Division(s): Izzatnagar

History
- Opened: 1906
- Closed: operating
- Rebuilt: Meter gauge to broad gauge in year 2015
- Former names: Rohailkhand and Kumaon Railway Company and Oudh and Tirhut Railway
- Computerized Ticketing Counters Luggage Checking System Parking Disabled Access Food Plaza Kiosks WC Taxi Stand Public Transportation
Location
- Location within India Location within Uttar Pradesh

Budaun junction is a main railway station in Badaun district, Uttar Pradesh. Its code is BEM. It serves Budaun city. The station consists of three platforms after gauge conversion of bareilly to kasganj railway line railway station was renovated .

The Rohilkhand and Kumaon Railway started construction of railway line from Bhojipura to Kathgodam under a contract dated 12 October 1882. This was the main line, 53.92 miles in length sanctioned in 1882 and opened on 12 October 1884. Later this line was extended from Bareilly to Soron in 1906.

The railway line Kasganj–Soron section was constructed by the Rajputana and Malwa Railways in 1885 when it was constructing the Kanpur–Achnera section. Later on, when the R&KR constructed the Bareilly–Soron line in 1906 the short section Soron–Kasganj was given over to it. The MG extensions from Moradabad to Kashipur, from Kashipur to Ramnagar and Lalkuan to Kashipur were completed by 1908.

Budaun railway station is well connected to, Ajmer Junction railway station, Jaipur Junction railway station, Bandra Terminus, Gonda Junction railway station, Gorakhpur Junction railway station, Darbhanga Junction, Vadodara, Kota Junction, Ratlam Junction, Tundla Junction, Mainpuri railway station, Farrukhabad Junction railway station, Mathura Junction, Ujhani, Bareilly, Gonda, Soron, Ramnagar, Bahraich, Agra, Pilibhit, Kasganj, Lakhimpur, Sitapur, Gola Gokarannath, Tanakpur, and Mumbai Central, etc.

== Gallery ==
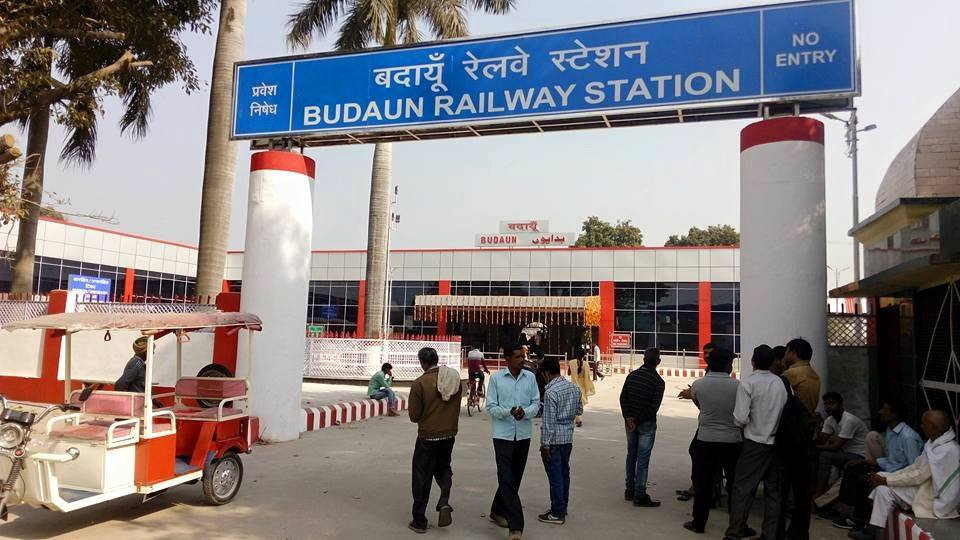
Budaun Railway Station entrance

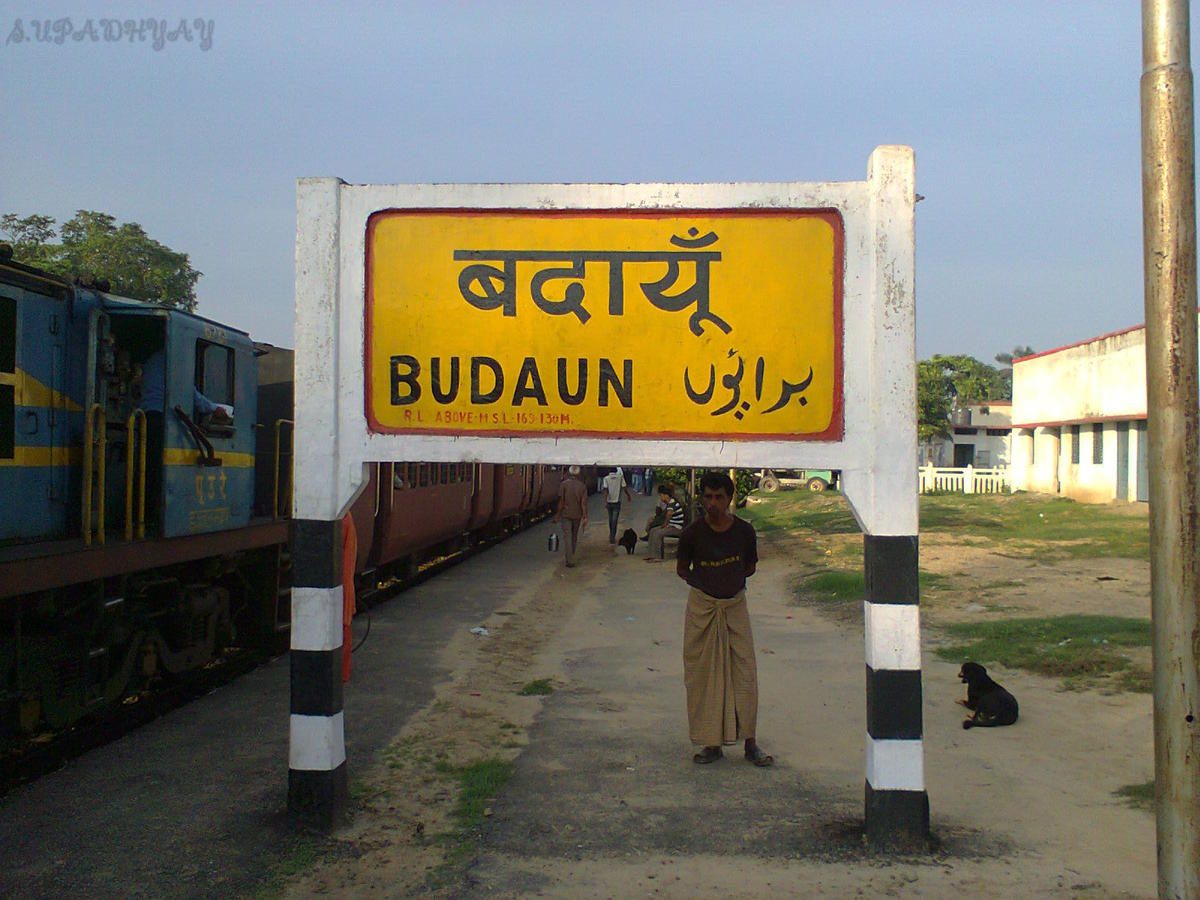
Badaun railway station board

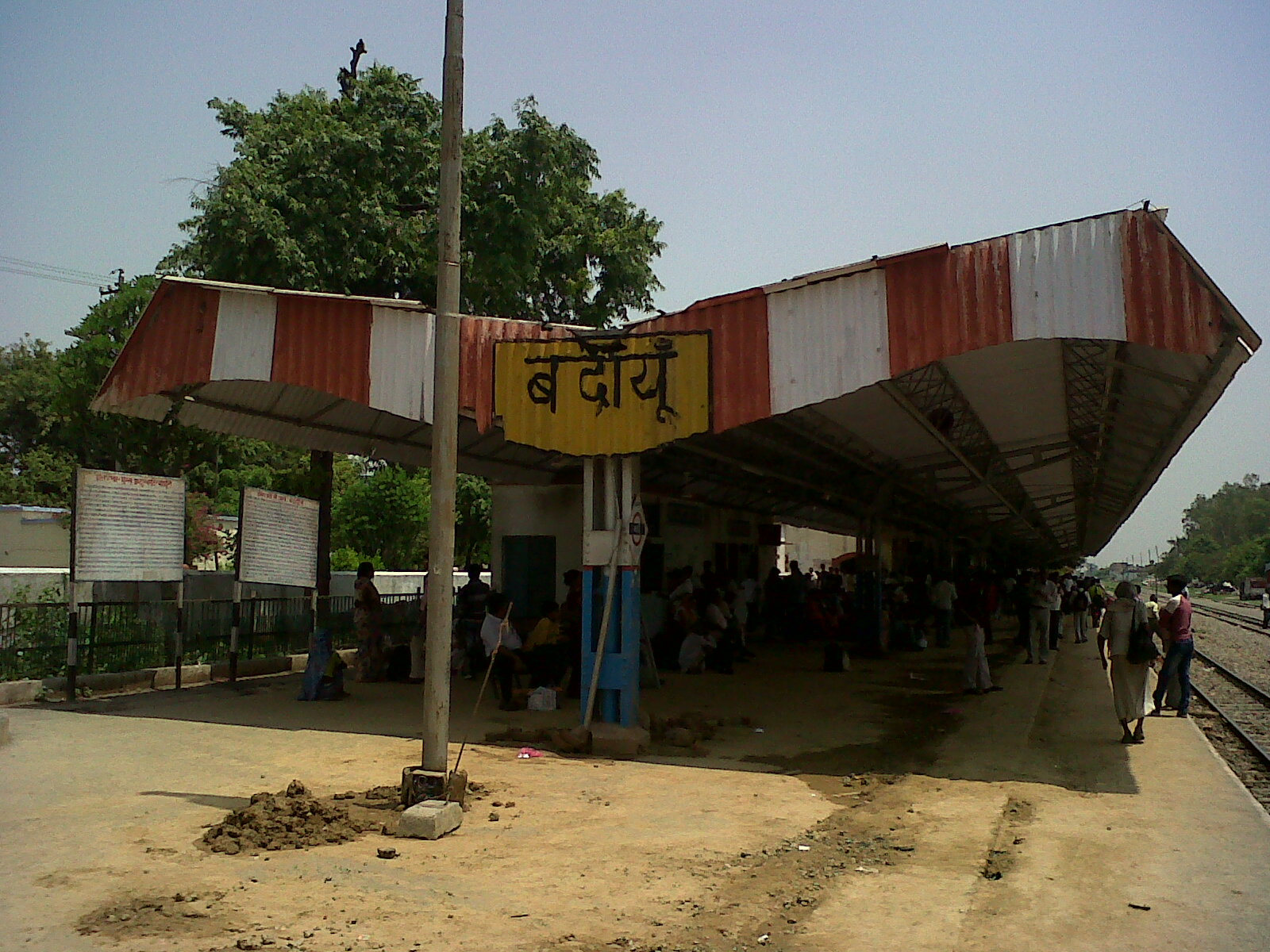
Badaun Railway Station shed
