= Block (district subdivision) =

Administrative division of some South Asian countries

A block is an administrative division of some South Asian countries.

== Bhutan ==
In Bhutan, a block is called a gewog. It is essentially for oil a group of villages. Gewogs are official administrative units of Bhutan. The country is composed of 205 gewogs.

Each gewog is headed by a gup or headman.

== India ==
Administrative structure of India

A block is a district sub-division for the purpose of rural development department and Panchayati Raj institutes. Cities have similar arrangements under the Urban Development department. Tehsils (also called talukas) are common across urban and rural areas for the administration of land and revenue department to keep track of land ownership and levy the land tax.

For planning purpose, a district is divided into four levels:

- Tehsils
- Blocks
- Gram panchayats
- Villages

A tehsil may consist of one or more blocks. Blocks are usually planning and development units of a district in addition to tehsils. A block represents a compact area for which effective plans are prepared and implemented through gram panchayats.

For example, Muzaffarnagar district of Uttar Pradesh has nine blocks: Muzaffarnagar, Budhana, Baghra, Shahpur, Purquazi, Charthawal, Morna, Jansath, and Khatauli.

=== Block development officer ===
The block development officer is the official in charge of a block. The officer monitors the implementation of all programmes relating to planning and development of the blocks. Coordination of development and implementation of plans in all blocks of a district is provided by a chief development officer (CDO). The BDO's office is the main operational wing of the government for the development administration as well as regulatory administration. A CD Block consists several gram panchayats in its limits. In some states the BDO functions as the secretary of the concerned Panchayat Samiti/Block Panchayat.

== See also ==
- List of community development blocks in India
