= Prem Swaroop Pathak =

Indian politician based in Uttar Pradesh

Member (MLA) of Uttar Pradesh Legislative Assembly
- In office 1996–2002
- Preceded by: Jugender Singh
- Succeeded by: Vimal Krishna Agarwal
- Constituency: Badaun

Personal details
- Born: Budaun district, Uttar Pradesh
- Party: Bharatiya Janata Party
- Children: Vagish Pathak
- Profession: Politician

Prem Swaroop Pathak is an Indian politician from Badaun, Uttar Pradesh. He represented Badaun constituency seat from Badaun district in 1996 Legislative Assembly elections from Bharatiya Janata Party and was also the former district president of BJP Badaun. Later he also nominated as candidate from Bisauli constituency in 2007, but he lost the election in comparison to Umlesh Yadav from RPD.
