= Badaun Lok Sabha constituency =

Lok Sabha Constituency in Uttar Pradesh, India

Coordinates: 28.03°N 79.13°E

Badaun UP-23
- Lok Sabha constituency
- Interactive Map Outlining Badaun Lok Sabha constituency

Constituency details
- Country: India
- Region: North India
- State: Uttar Pradesh
- Assembly constituencies: Gunnaur; Bisauli; Sahaswan; Bilsi; Badaun
- Established: 1952
- Reservation: None

Member of Parliament
- 18th Lok Sabha
- Incumbent Aditya Yadav
- Party: Samajwadi Party
- Elected year: 2024

Badaun Lok Sabha constituency (Hindi pronunciation: [bəd̪aːjũː]) is one of the 80 Lok Sabha (parliamentary) constituencies in Uttar Pradesh state in India.

== Assembly segments ==
Presently, Badaun Lok Sabha constituency comprises five Vidhan Sabha (legislative assembly) segments. These are:

No	Name	District	Member	Party	2024 Lead
111	Gunnaur	Sambhal	Ramkhiladi Singh Yadav	SP	SP
112	Bisauli (SC)	Budaun	Ashutosh Maurya	SP	BJP
113	Sahaswan	Budaun	Brajesh Yadav	SP	SP
114	Bilsi	Budaun	Harish Shakya	BJP	BJP
115	Badaun	Budaun	Mahesh Chandra Gupta	BJP	BJP

== Members of Parliament ==
Year	Member	Party
1952	Badan Singh	Indian National Congress
1957	Raghubir Sahai	Indian National Congress
1962	Onkar Singh	Bharatiya Jana Sangh
1967	Onkar Singh	Bharatiya Jana Sangh
1971	Karan Singh Yadav	Indian National Congress
1977	Onkar Singh	Janata Party
1980	Mohammad Asrar Ahmad	Indian National Congress
1984	Saleem Iqbal Shervani	Indian National Congress
1989	Sharad Yadav	Janata Dal
1991	Swami Chinmayanand	Bharatiya Janata Party
1996	Saleem Iqbal Shervani	Samajwadi Party
1998	Saleem Iqbal Shervani	Samajwadi Party
1999	Saleem Iqbal Shervani	Samajwadi Party
2004	Saleem Iqbal Shervani	Samajwadi Party
2009	Dharmendra Yadav	Samajwadi Party
2014	Dharmendra Yadav	Samajwadi Party
2019	Sanghmitra Maurya	Bharatiya Janata Party
2024	Aditya Yadav	Samajwadi Party

== Election results ==
=== General election 2024 ===
2024 Indian general elections: Badaun
Party	Candidate	Votes	%	±%
SP	Aditya Yadav	501,855	45.97	▲0.38
BJP	Durvijay Sakya	4,66,864	42.76	▼4.54
BSP	Muslim Khan	97,751	8.95	▲8.95
NOTA	None of the Above	8,562	0.78	▼0.02
Majority		34,991	3.21	▲1.50
Turnout		10,91,764	54.05	▼3.12
SP gain from BJP		Swing		

=== General Election 2019 ===
2019 Indian general elections: Badaun
Party	Candidate	Votes	%	±%
BJP	Sanghmitra Maurya	511,352	47.30	+14.99
SP	Dharmendra Yadav	4,92,898	45.59	−18.18
INC	Saleem Iqbal Shervani	51,947	4.80	+4.24
NOTA	None of the Above	8,606	0.80	+0.19
Majority		18,454	1.71	
Turnout		10,81,474	57.17	
BJP gain from SP		Swing		

=== General election 2014 ===
2014 Indian general elections: Badaun
Party	Candidate	Votes	%	±%
SP	Dharmendra Yadav	498,378	48.50	
BJP	Vagish Pathak	3,32,031	32.31	
BSP	Akmal Khan	1,56,973	15.27	
Mahan Dal	Paglanand Kumar	5,748	0.56	
Independent	Munshi Lal	5,651	0.55	
NOTA	None of the Above	6,286	0.61	
Majority		1,66,347	16.19	
Turnout		10,27,669	58.09	
SP hold		Swing		

=== General election 2009 ===
2009 Indian general elections: Badaun
Party	Candidate	Votes	%	±%
SP	Dharmendra Yadav	233,744	31.70	
BSP	Dharam Pal Yadav	2,01,202	27.29	
INC	Saleem Iqbal Shervani	1,93,834	26.29	
JD(U)	D. K. Bhardwaj	74,079	10.05	
Independent	Bhagwan Singh	11,819	1.60	
Independent	Dharmendra Yadav	10,368	1.41	
Majority		32,542	4.41	
Turnout		7,37,308	52.45	
SP hold		Swing		

== See also ==
- Badaun district
- List of constituencies of the Lok Sabha
