= Vimal Krishna Agarwal =

Indian politician based in Uttar Pradesh

- Pappi

Member (MLA) of Uttar Pradesh Legislative Assembly
- In office 2002–2007
- Preceded by: Prem Swaroop Pathak
- Succeeded by: Mahesh Chandra Gupta
- Constituency: Badaun

Personal details
- Born: Budaun district, Uttar Pradesh
- Party: Bharatiya Janata Party
- Spouse: Poonam Agarwal
- Profession: Politician

Vimal Krishna Agarwal also known as Pappi is an Indian politician. He represented Badaun constituency seat from Badaun district in 2002 Legislative Assembly elections from Bahujan Samaj Party and was also the former minister in the UP government. Later he was also nominated by Samajwadi Party as candidate from Bilsi constituency in 2012 and 2017, but succeeded by Musarrat Ali Bittan and Radha Krishan Sharma respectively.
