= Abid Raza Khan =

Indian politician

MLA, 16th Legislative Assembly
- In office Mar 2012 – Till 2016
- Preceded by: Mahesh Chandra Gupta
- Succeeded by: Mahesh Chandra Gupta
- Constituency: Badaun

Personal details
- Born: 29 March 1972 (age 54) Budaun district
- Citizenship: Indian
- Party: Indian National Congress
- Other political affiliations: Samajwadi Party
- Parent: Hamid Raza Khan (father)
- Education: M. J. P. Rohilkhand University
- Profession: Businessperson, politician

Abid Raza Khan (born 29 March 1972) is an Indian politician and a member of the Sixteenth Legislative Assembly of Uttar Pradesh in India. He represents the Badaun constituency of Uttar Pradesh and was a member of the Samajwadi Party political party and considered very close to Azam Khan and Akhilesh Yadav. Recently he joined Indian National Congress.

== Early life and education ==
Abid Raza Khan was born in Budaun district. He attended the M. J. P. Rohilkhand University and attained Diploma in Computer Science.

== Political career ==
Abid Raza Khan was a MLA for one term. He represented the Badaun constituency and is a member of the Samajwadi Party.

He has political relations with big personalities of Samajwadi Party like Azam Khan. Due to some controversy with M.P. Dharmendra Yadav he left the Samajwadi Party and joined the Indian National Congress.

He lost his seat in the 2017 Uttar Pradesh Assembly election to Mahesh Chandra Gupta of the Bharatiya Janata Party.

== Posts held ==
#	From	To	Position	Comments
01	2012	2017	Member, 16th Legislative Assembly	

== See also ==
- Badaun (Assembly constituency)
- Sixteenth Legislative Assembly of Uttar Pradesh
- Uttar Pradesh Legislative Assembly
