= Sahaswan Assembly constituency =

Constituency of the Uttar Pradesh legislative assembly in India

Sahaswan
- Constituency No. 113 for the Uttar Pradesh Legislative Assembly

Constituency details
- Country: India
- Region: North India
- State: Uttar Pradesh
- District: Badaun
- Established: 1956
- Total electors: 398,000 (2017)
- Reservation: None

Member of Legislative Assembly
- 18th Uttar Pradesh Legislative Assembly
- Incumbent Brajesh Yadav
- Party: Samajwadi Party
- Elected year: 2022

Sahaswan Assembly constituency is one of the 403 constituencies of the Uttar Pradesh Legislative Assembly, India. It is a part of the Badaun district and one of the five assembly constituencies in the Badaun Lok Sabha constituency. First election in this assembly constituency was held in 1957 after the "DPACO (1956)" (delimitation order) was passed in 1956. After the "Delimitation of Parliamentary and Assembly Constituencies Order" was passed in 2008, the constituency was assigned identification number 113.

== Wards / Areas ==
Extent of Sahaswan Assembly constituency is KCs Madhyami, Sahaswan, Sailabi & Sahaswan MB of Sahaswan Tehsil; KC Ughaiti, Rudyan NP & Islamnagar NP of Bilsi Tehsil.

== Members of the Legislative Assembly ==
#	Term	Name	Party	From	To	Days	Comments	Ref
01	01st Vidhan Sabha	–	–	Mar 1952	Mar 1957	1,849	Constituency not in existence	
02	02nd Vidhan Sabha	Ulfat Singh	Independent	Apr 1957	Mar 1962	1,800	–	
03	03rd Vidhan Sabha	Ulfat Singh	Bharatiya Jana Sangh	Mar 1962	Mar 1967	1,828	–	
04	04th Vidhan Sabha	Asharfi Lal	Bharatiya Jana Sangh	Mar 1967	Apr 1968	402	–	
05	05th Vidhan Sabha	Shanti Devi	Bharatiya Kranti Dal	Feb 1969	Mar 1974	1,832	–	
06	06th Vidhan Sabha	Shanti Devi	Bharatiya Kranti Dal	Mar 1974	Apr 1977	1,153	–	
07	07th Vidhan Sabha	Naresh Pal Singh Yadav	Janata Party	Jun 1977	Feb 1980	969	–	
08	08th Vidhan Sabha	Meer Mizhar Ali	Indian National Congress (I)	Jun 1980	Mar 1985	1,735	–	
09	09th Vidhan Sabha	Naresh Pal Singh Yadav	Lok Dal	Mar 1985	Nov 1989	1,725	–	
10	10th Vidhan Sabha	Mirmazhar Ali	Independent	Dec 1989	Apr 1991	488	–	
11	11th Vidhan Sabha	Omkar Singh Yadav	Janata Dal	Jun 1991	Dec 1992	533	–	
12	12th Vidhan Sabha	Mirmazhar Ali	Samajwadi Party	Dec 1993	Oct 1995	693	–	
13	13th Vidhan Sabha	Mulayam Singh Yadav	Samajwadi Party	Oct 1996	1996		Resigned	
^	13th Vidhan Sabha	Omkar Singh Yadav	Samajwadi Party	1997	2002		By Poll	
14	14th Vidhan Sabha	Omkar Singh Yadav	Samajwadi Party	Feb 2002	May 2007	1,902	–	
15	15th Vidhan Sabha	D. P. Yadav	Rashtriya Parivartan Dal	May 2007	Mar 2012	1,762	–	
16	16th Vidhan Sabha	Omkar Singh Yadav	Samajwadi Party	Mar 2012	Mar 2017	1,803	–	
17	17th Vidhan Sabha	Omkar Singh Yadav	Samajwadi Party	Mar 2017	Mar 2022	–	–	
18	18th Vidhan Sabha	Brajesh Yadav	Samajwadi Party	Mar 2022	Incumbent			

== Election results ==
=== 2027 ===
2027 Uttar Pradesh Legislative Assembly election: Sahaswan
Party	Candidate	Votes	%	±%
INDIA				
NDA				
BSP				
NOTA	None of the above			
Majority				
Turnout				
gain from		Swing		

=== 2022 ===
2022 Uttar Pradesh Legislative Assembly election: Sahaswan
Party	Candidate	Votes	%	±%
SP	Brajesh Yadav	83,673	34.35	+1.15
BSP	Haji Musarrat	69,728	27.79	−2.64
BJP	D. K. Bhardwaj	66,616	26.55	+16.52
RPD	Kunal Singh	24,060	9.59	−14.3
NOTA	None of the above	1,899	0.76	−0.46
Majority		13,945	5.56	+3.79
Turnout		250,872	58.86	−1.55
SP hold		Swing		

=== 2017 ===
2017 Uttar Pradesh Legislative Assembly Election: Sahaswan
Party	Candidate	Votes	%	±%
SP	Omkar Singh Yadav	77,543	32.2	
BSP	Arshad Ali	73,274	30.43	
RPD	Umlesh Yadav	57,522	23.89	
BJP	Ashtosh Varshney	24,152	10.03	
NOTA	None of the above	2,902	1.22	
Majority		4,269	1.77	
Turnout		240,800	60.41	

=== 2012 ===
2012 General Elections: Sahaswan
Party	Candidate	Votes	%	±%
SP	Omkar Singh Yadav	72,000	33.01	–
BSP	Mir Hadi Ali	65,919	29.83	–
RPD	D. P. Yadav	56,243	25.45	–
	Remainder 8 candidates	25,888	11.71	–
Majority		7,027	3.18	–
Turnout		220,996	62.48	–
SP gain from RPD		Swing		

== See also ==
- Budaun district
- Badaun Lok Sabha constituency
- Sixteenth Legislative Assembly of Uttar Pradesh
- Uttar Pradesh Legislative Assembly
- Vidhan Bhawan
