= Jarenda =

- Village
- Jarainda
- Location in Uttar Pradesh, India
- Coordinates: 28.3468835°N 78.7791683°E
- Country: India
- State: Uttar Pradesh
- District: Badaun
- Established: 16th century

Area
  - Total: 338.6 ha (837 acres)

Population (2011)
  - Total: 1,861
- Demonym: metric

Languages
  - Official: Hindi
- Time zone: UTC+5:30 (IST)
- PIN: 243723
- Telephone code: 05834
- Vehicle registration: UP 24

Jarainda is a medium size village located in Bisauli of Budaun district in the Indian state of Uttar Pradesh with total 306 families residing. The Jarainda village has population of 1861 of which 966 are males while 895 are females as per Population Census 2011.

== Education ==
Catse Factor in Jareinda
Religion	Percent
Scheduled Castes	19.29%
Scheduled Tribes	%
Forward caste	%
Other Backward Class†	%
Distribution of religions †Includes Sikhs (0.0%), Buddhists (0.0%), Not stated 0.01%

There is an old Primary School in Jarainda.

== Corporate ==
The Village Has an IT(Information Technology) Firm Named 'Macraze Technologies India Private Limited' Registered to It.
