= Gunnaur Assembly constituency =

Constituency of the Uttar Pradesh legislative assembly in India

Gunnaur
- Constituency No. 111 for the Uttar Pradesh Legislative Assembly

Constituency details
- Country: India
- Region: North India
- State: Uttar Pradesh
- District: Sambhal
- Total electors: 3,72,513 (2022)
- Reservation: None

Member of Legislative Assembly
- 18th Uttar Pradesh Legislative Assembly
- Incumbent Ramkhiladi Yadav
- Party: Samajwadi Party
- Elected year: 2022

Gunnaur Assembly constituency is one of the 403 constituencies of the Uttar Pradesh Legislative Assembly, India. It is a part of the Budaun district and one of the five assembly constituencies in the Badaun Lok Sabha constituency. The first election in this assembly constituency was held in 1952 after the "DPACO (1951)" (delimitation order) was passed in 1951. After the "Delimitation of Parliamentary and Assembly Constituencies Order" was passed in 2008, the constituency was assigned identification number 111.

== Wards / Areas ==
Extent of Gunnaur Assembly constituency is Gunnaur Tehsil.

== Members of Legislative Assembly ==
Year	Member	Party
1952	Karan Singh	Indian National Congress
1957	Jamuna Singh	Praja Socialist Party
1962	Jugal Kishore	Praja Socialist Party
1967	Jugal Kishore	Indian National Congress
1969	Rishi Pal Singh	Bharatiya Jana Sangh
1974	Jugal Kishore	Bharatiya Kranti Dal
1977	Sheoraj Singh	Independent
1979^	Prem Wati	Janata Party
1980	Prem Wati	Janata Party (Secular)
1985	Pushpa Devi	Indian National Congress
1989	Pushpa Devi	Indian National Congress
1991	Ramkhiladi Yadav	Janata Dal
1993	Rajesh Kumar	Samajwadi Party
1996	Ramkhiladi Yadav	Janata Dal
2002	Ajit Kumar Yadav	Janata Dal (United)
2004^	Mulayam Singh Yadav	Samajwadi Party
2007	Mulayam Singh Yadav	Samajwadi Party
2007^	Pradeep Kumar	Samajwadi Party
2012	Ramkhiladi Yadav	Samajwadi Party
2017	Ajit Kumar Yadav	Bharatiya Janata Party
2022	Ramkhiladi Yadav	Samajwadi Party

== Election results ==
=== 2027 ===
2027 Uttar Pradesh Legislative Assembly election: Gunnaur
Party	Candidate	Votes	%	±%
INDIA				
NDA				
BSP				
NOTA	None of the above			
Majority				
Turnout				
gain from		Swing		

=== 2022 ===
2022 Uttar Pradesh Legislative Assembly election: Gunnaur
Party	Candidate	Votes	%	±%
SP	Ramkhiladi Yadav	123,969	51.38	+9.24
BJP	Ajeet Kumar Yadav	94,440	39.14	−8.0
BSP	Firoz Khan	15,068	6.24	−0.81
NOTA	None of the above	2,601	1.08	−0.09
Majority		29,529	12.24	+7.24
Turnout		241,292	58.68	−2.45
SP gain from BJP		Swing		

=== 2017 ===
2017 Uttar Pradesh Legislative Assembly Election: Gunnaur
Party	Candidate	Votes	%	±%
BJP	Ajeet Kumar Yadav	107,344	47.14	
SP	Ramkhiladi Yadav	95,958	42.14	
BSP	Mohammad Islam Khan	16,052	7.05	
NOTA	None of the above	2,639	1.17	
Majority		11,386	5.0	
Turnout		227,731	61.13	
BJP gain from SP		Swing		

=== 2012 ===
2012 General Elections: Gunnaur
Party	Candidate	Votes	%	±%
SP	Ramkhiladi Yadav	107,378	53.19	−
INC	Ajeet Kumar Yadav	60,720	30.08	−
BSP	Bhoopendra Singh	19,326	9.57	−
	Remainder 5 candidates	14,462	7.16	−
Majority		46,658	23.11	−
Turnout		201,886	59.14	−
SP hold		Swing		

=== 2007 ===
2007 Bye Elections: Gunnaur
Party	Candidate	Votes	%	±%
SP	Pradeep Kumar Yadav	65,232	46.27	−
BSP	Deepak Kumar Yadav	51,569	36.58	−
RPD	Dharamveer Yadav	11,398	18.45	−
Bharatiya Janata party	Gulfam Singh Yadav	3,220	2.28	−
	Remainder 7 candidates	9,576	6.82	−
Majority		13,663	9.69	−
Turnout		14,0995		−
SP hold		Swing		

=== 2007 ===
Uttar Pradesh Assembly election, 2007:Gunnaur
Party	Candidate	Votes	%	±%
SP	Mulayam Singh Yadav	54,696		
BSP	Arif Ali	23,049		
JD(U)	Bhoopendra Singh	7,550		
INC	Piyush Ranjan Yadav	2,940		
Majority		31647	35.04	
Turnout		90311	35.57	
Registered electors		253,894		
SP hold				

=== 2004 ===
Uttar Pradesh Assembly by election, 2004:Gunnaur
Party	Candidate	Votes	%	±%
SP	Mulayam Singh Yadav	195,213	91.45	
BSP	Arif Ali	11,314		
BJP	Gulfam Singh Yadav	6,941		
Majority		1,83,899		
SP gain from JD(U)		Swing		

=== 2002 ===
2002 Uttar Pradesh Legislative Assembly election: Gunnaur
Party	Candidate	Votes	%	±%
JD(U)	Ajeet Kumar Yadav	46,998	36.31	
SP	Ramkhiladi Yadav	41817	32.31	
BSP	Rishipal Singh Yadav	25579	19.76	
RPD	Rajpal singh Yadav	6864	5.30	
NOTA	None of the above	0	0	
Majority		5181	4%	{{{change}}}
Turnout		129444		
AJEET KUMAR alias Raju Yadav gain from		Swing		

=== 1996 ===
1996 Uttar Pradesh Legislative Assembly election: Gunnaur
Party	Candidate	Votes	%	±%
Janta Dal	Ramkhiladi Yadav	60,511	49.38	
BSP	AJEET KUMAR alias Raju Yadav	40264	32.26	
BJP	Rajpal singh Yadav	20716	16.90	
Bhoomijotak Samooh	Ram Naresh	629	0.51	
Independent	Bhagat Singh	428	0.35	
Majority		20247	16.5	{{{change}}}
Turnout		123736		
Ramkhiladi Singh Yadav gain from		Swing	JD	

== See also ==
- Sambhal district
- Budaun Lok Sabha constituency
- Sixteenth Legislative Assembly of Uttar Pradesh
- Uttar Pradesh Legislative Assembly
- Vidhan Bhawan
