= Faridpur Nausana =

Indian Village

Nausana
- Village
- Location in Uttar Pradesh, India Nausana (India)
- Coordinates: 28.14°N 79.30°E
- Country: India
- State: Uttar Pradesh
- District: Budaun

Government
  - MP: Sanghamitra Maurya
  - MLA: Mahesh Chandra Gupta

Area
  - Total: 2.19 km^{2} (0.85 sq mi)
- Elevation: 164 m (538 ft)

Population (2011)
  - Total: 1,418
  - Density: 647/km^{2} (1,680/sq mi)

Languages
  - Official: Hindi, Urdu
- Time zone: UTC+5:30 (IST)
- PIN: Pin Code 243634
- Vehicle registration: UP 24
- Website: up.gov.in

Nausana is a medium size village and also a Gram Panchayat located in Salarpur, Budaun block, tehsil in Budaun district in the northern Indian state of Uttar Pradesh. It is approximately 27 kilometres (17 mi) from Budaun city, district headquarter. The Village 286 kilometres (178 mi) north of the state capital, Lucknow, and 250 kilometres (155 mi) east of the national capital, New Delhi. The village has population of 1418 of which 1000 are males while 900 are females as per Population Census 2023.

== Geography ==
The village has population of 1418 of which 726 are males while 692 are females as per Population Census 2011.
