= Bilsi Assembly constituency =

Constituency of the Uttar Pradesh legislative assembly in India

Bilsi
- Constituency No. 114 for the Uttar Pradesh Legislative Assembly

Constituency details
- Country: India
- Region: North India
- State: Uttar Pradesh
- District: Badaun
- Established: 1967
- Total electors: 293,359 (2012)
- Reservation: None

Member of Legislative Assembly
- 18th Uttar Pradesh Legislative Assembly
- Incumbent Harish Chandra Shakya
- Party: Bharatiya Janata Party

Bilsi Assembly constituency is one of the 403 constituencies of the Uttar Pradesh Legislative Assembly, India. It is a part of the Badaun district and one of the five assembly constituencies in the Badaun Lok Sabha constituency. First election in this assembly constituency was held in 1974 after the delimitation order was passed in 1967. After the "Delimitation of Parliamentary and Assembly Constituencies Order" was passed in 2008, the constituency was assigned identification number 114.

== Wards / Areas ==
Extent of Bilsi Assembly constituency is KC Kaulhai of Sahaswan Tehsil; KC Ujhani, Ujhani MB & Kachhla NP of Budaun Tehsil; KC Bilsi & Bilsi MB of Bilsi Tehsil.

== Members of the Legislative Assembly ==
#	Term	Name	Party	From	To	Days	Comments	Ref
1	6th Vidhan Sabha	Sohan Lal	Bharatiya Jana Sangh	Mar 1974	Apr 1977	1,153	–	
2	7th Vidhan Sabha	Son Pal	Janata Party	Jun 1977	Feb 1980	969	–	
3	8th Vidhan Sabha	Kesho Ram	Indian National Congress (I)	Jun 1980	Mar 1985	1,735	–	
4	9th Vidhan Sabha	Bhola Shanker Maurya	Indian National Congress	Mar 1985	Nov 1989	1,725	–	
5	10th Vidhan Sabha	Daulat Ram	Janata Dal	Dec 1989	Apr 1991	488	–	
6	11th Vidhan Sabha	Bhola Shanker Maurya	Indian National Congress	Jun 1991	Dec 1992	533	–	
7	12th Vidhan Sabha	Yogender Kumar Sagar	Bharatiya Janata Party	Dec 1993	Oct 1995	693	–	
8	13th Vidhan Sabha	Mayawati (1996–1997); Bhola Shanker Morya (1997–2002)	Bahujan Samaj Party	Oct 1996	May 2002	1,967	–	
9	14th Vidhan Sabha	Ashutosh Maurya	Samajwadi Party	Feb 2002	May 2007	1,902	–	
10	15th Vidhan Sabha	Yogendra Sagar	Bahujan Samaj Party	May 2007	Mar 2012	1,762	–	
11	16th Vidhan Sabha	Musarrat Ali Bittan	Bahujan Samaj Party	Mar 2012	Mar 2017	1,803	–	
17	17th Vidhan Sabha	Radha Krishan Sharma	Bharatiya Janata Party	Mar 2017	Mar 2022	–	–	
18	18th Vidhan Sabha	Harish Chandra Shakya	Bharatiya Janata Party	Mar 2022	Incumbent	–	–	

== Election results ==
=== 2027 ===
2027 Uttar Pradesh Legislative Assembly election: Bilsi
Party	Candidate	Votes	%	±%
INDIA				
NDA				
BSP				
NOTA	None of the above			
Majority				
Turnout				
gain from		Swing		

=== 2022 ===
Eighteenth Legislative Assembly of Uttar Pradesh

2022 Uttar Pradesh Legislative Assembly election: Bilsi
Party	Candidate	Votes	%	±%
BJP	Harish Chandra	93,500	45.54	+3.67
SP	Chandra Prakash Maurya	68,385	33.31	+7.37
BSP	Mamta Shakya	31,694	15.44	−12.66
ASP(KR)	Mir Hadi Ali	2,790	1.36	
RPD	Veer Pal Singh	2,033	0.99	
INC	Ankit Chauhan	1,890	0.92	
NOTA	None of the above	1,173	0.57	−0.42
Majority		25,115	12.23	−1.54
Turnout		205,319	57.8	−0.89
BJP hold		Swing		

=== 2017 ===
2017 Uttar Pradesh Legislative Assembly Election: Bilsi
Party	Candidate	Votes	%	±%
BJP	Radha Krishan Sharma	82,070	41.87	
BSP	Musarrat Ali Bittan	55,091	28.1	
SP	Vimal Krishan Aggarwal	50,848	25.94	
Jan Adhikar Manch	Rizwan Ali	1,846	0.94	
NOTA	None of the above	1,930	0.99	
Majority		26,979	13.77	
Turnout		196,030	58.69	

=== 2012 ===
2012 General Elections: Bilsi
Party	Candidate	Votes	%	±%
BSP	Musarrat Ali Bittan	57,600	32.43	–
SP	Vimal Krishan Aggrawal	49,272	27.74	–
LKD	Suresh Pal Singh Tomar	23,360	13.15	–
	Remainder 12 candidates	47,390	26.69	–
Majority		8,328	4.69	–
Turnout		177,622	60.55	–
BSP hold		Swing		

== See also ==
- Badaun Lok Sabha constituency
- Budaun district
- Sixteenth Legislative Assembly of Uttar Pradesh
- Uttar Pradesh Legislative Assembly
- Vidhan Bhawan
