= Faizganj =

- Town Village
- Faizganj behta
- Location in Uttar Pradesh, India Faizganj (India)
- Coordinates: 28°22′56″N 78°50′36″E
- Country: India
- State: Uttar Pradesh
- District: Budaun
- Region: Rohilkhand

Government
  - Body: Bisauli Municipal corporation
  - MLA: Ashutosh Maurya
  - Chairman: Israr khan

Population (2001)
  - Total: 10,036
- Demonym: Faizganjiya

Languages
  - Official: Hindi & Urdu
- Time zone: UTC+5:30 (IST)
- Vehicle registration: UP-24
- Coastline: 0 kilometres (0 mi)
- Climate: HS-TH (Köppen)
- Website: up.gov.in

Faizganj is a town and a nagar panchayat in Budaun district in the state of Uttar Pradesh, India.

== Demographics ==
As of 2001 India census, Faizganj had a population of 10,036. Males constitute 54% of the population and females 46%. Faizganj has an average literacy rate of 34%, lower than the national average of 59.5%: male literacy is 42%, and female literacy is 24%. In Faizganj, 21% of the population is under 6 years of age.
