= Kartoli =

Village in Uttar Pradesh, India

Kartoli करतोली Kartauli
- Village
- Location in Uttar Pradesh, India Kartoli (India)
- Coordinates: 28.17°N 79.25°E
- Country: India
- State: Uttar Pradesh
- District: Budaun

Government
  - MP: Sanghamitra Maurya
  - MLA: Mahesh Chandra Gupta

Area
  - Total: 3.39 km^{2} (1.31 sq mi)
- Elevation: 164 m (538 ft)

Population (2011)
  - Total: 4,200
  - Density: 1,200/km^{2} (3,200/sq mi)

Languages
  - Official: Hindi, Urdu
- Time zone: UTC+5:30 (IST)
- PIN: Pin Code 243634
- Vehicle registration: UP 24
- Website: up.gov.in

Kartoli or Kartauli is a village in northern India and a Gram Panchayat located in Salarpur, Budaun Block, Tehsil in Budaun district of Uttar Pradesh. It is approximately 24 kilometres (15 mi) from Budaun, the district headquarter. The village is 283 kilometres (176 mi) north of the Lucknow, the State Capital of Uttar Pradesh, and is 276 kilometres (171 mi) east of New Delhi. There is also a railway halt in the village.

== Geography ==
The total geographical area of village is 398.35 hectares. Kartoli has a total population of 4,200 people, out of which male population is 2,259 while female population is 1,941. Literacy rate of Kartoli is 31.07% out of which 39.04% males and 21.79% females are literate. There are about 640 houses in kartoli village. Pincode of Kartoli village locality is 243624.

== History ==
The great-grand father of Ala Hazrat, Hafiz Kazim Ali Khan, the elder son of Hazrat Azam Khan was the collector of Budaun district in British era. He was awarded Jagir (land grant) in the village Kartoli of Budaun district about 36 kilometres (22 mi) away from Bareilly district. This land remained under possession of the family of Ala Hazrat till 1978. Hafiz Kazim Ali Khan was the disciple of Maulana Anwarul Haque firangimahli (d 1236 A.H.) Anwarul Haque firangimahli was the teacher of Imam Ahmad Raza's saintly guide shah Aale Rasool Marahravi. Hafiz Kazim Ali Khan had been holding Milad celebration every year on 12th Rabiul-Auwal. This is still continuings in this dynasty. After the death of Ala Hazrat and his younger brother Hassan Raza Khan, his grandsons Bilal Raza Khan and Uvais Raza Khan were the Zamindar (landlords) of the village.
