= Harish Shakya =

Indian politician

Harish Chandra Shakya
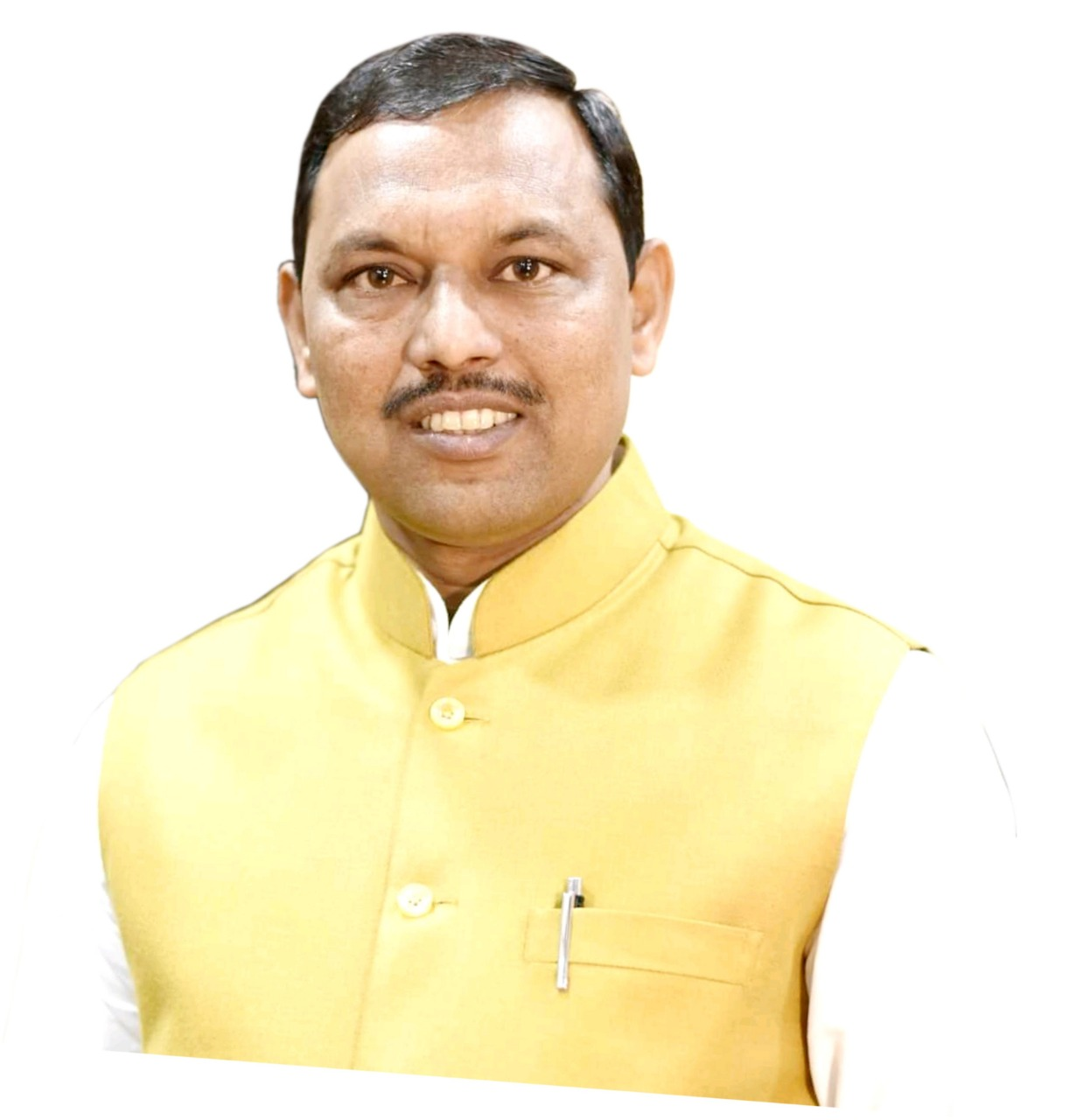

Member of Uttar Pradesh Legislative Assembly
- Incumbent
- Assumed office 2022
- Preceded by: Radha Krishan Sharma
- Constituency: Bilsi

Personal details
- Born: 25 June 1977 (age 49) Bilhat, Budaun district
- Party: Bhartiya Janata Party
- Spouse: Rekha Shakya (m. 2005)
- Children: 1 son, 2 daughters
- Parent: Netram Shakya (father)

Harish Chandra Shakya (born 25 June 1977) better known as Harish Shakya is an Indian politician and current MLA representing Bilsi (Assembly constituency). He won the 2022 Uttar Pradesh Legislative Assembly election from the Bhartiya Janta Party. He is the former BJP Backward Class Regional President from the Braj Region.

== Political career ==
Harish Shakya started his career in 1998 from Akhil Bharatiya Vidyarthi Parishad as district head. He was the district president of Bharatiya Janata Yuva Morcha from 2004 to 2007.

In 2008 Shakya was appointed BJP District General Secretary and in 2016 the party appointed him as BJP district chief from Budaun district. He served this position till 2019.

In 2022, he was elected as a Member of the Legislative Assembly from the Bilsi (Assembly constituency) and won the 2022 Uttar Pradesh Legislative Assembly election with a 45.54% vote margin.

== Electoral performance ==
2022 Uttar Pradesh Legislative Assembly election: Bilsi
Party	Candidate	Votes	%	±%
BJP	Harish Chandra Shakya	93,500	45.54	
SP	Chandra Prakash Maurya	68,385	33.31	
BSP	Smt. Mamata Shakya	31,694	15.44	
Azad Samaj Party	Mir Hadi Ali Urf Babar Miyan	2,790	1.36	
RPD	Veer Pal Singh	2,033	0.99	
Majority				
Turnout		205,319		
Registered electors		293,359		
BJP gain from SP		Swing		
