= Bisauli Assembly constituency =

Constituency of the Uttar Pradesh legislative assembly in India

Bisauli
- Constituency No. 112 for the Uttar Pradesh Legislative Assembly

Constituency details
- Country: India
- Region: North India
- State: Uttar Pradesh
- District: Badaun
- Total electors: 348,849 (2012)
- Reservation: SC

Member of Legislative Assembly
- 18th Uttar Pradesh Legislative Assembly
- Incumbent Ashutosh Maurya
- Party: Samajwadi Party
- Elected year: 2022

Bisauli Assembly constituency is one of the 403 constituencies of the Uttar Pradesh Legislative Assembly, India. It is a part of the Badaun district and one of the five assembly constituencies in the Badaun Lok Sabha constituency. First election in this assembly constituency was held in 1957 after the "DPACO (1956)" (delimitation order) was passed in 1956. After the "Delimitation of Parliamentary and Assembly Constituencies Order" was passed in 2008, the constituency was assigned identification number 112.

== Wards / Areas ==
Extent of Bisauli Assembly constituency is KCs Bisauli, Karanpur, Asafpur, PCs Singthara, Katgaon, Vagrain, Gargaia, Penpal, Agei, Uraina, Saidpur, Pusgawan, Hatra, Baraur Amanullapur, Khurrampur Bhamori, Rahedia, Byoli, Veerampur, Manakpur of Satasi KC, Bisauli MB, Mudia NP, Saidpur NP & Faizganj NP of Bisauli Tehsil.

== Members of the Legislative Assembly ==
#	Term	Name	Party	From	To	Days	Comments	Ref
01	02nd Vidhan Sabha	Shiv Raj Singh	Indian National Congress	Apr-1957	Mar-1962	1,800	Constituency had two seats	
02	02nd Vidhan Sabha	Kesho Ram	Indian National Congress	Apr-1957	Mar-1962	1,800	Constituency had two seats	
03	03rd Vidhan Sabha	Shiv Raj Singh	Indian National Congress	Mar-1962	Mar-1967	1,828	–	
04	04th Vidhan Sabha	S. Singh	Bharatiya Jana Sangh	Mar-1967	Apr-1968	402	–	
05	05th Vidhan Sabha	Shiv Raj Singh	Bharatiya Kranti Dal	Feb-1969	Mar-1974	1,832	–	
06	06th Vidhan Sabha	Krishan Vir Singh	Bharatiya Kranti Dal	Mar-1974	Apr-1977	1,153	–	
07	07th Vidhan Sabha	Brij Ballabh	Independent	Jun-1977	Feb-1980	969	–	
08	08th Vidhan Sabha	Brij Ballabh	Indian National Congress (I)	Jun-1980	Mar-1985	1,735	–	
09	09th Vidhan Sabha	Yogendra Kumar	Independent	Mar-1985	Nov-1989	1,725	–	
10	10th Vidhan Sabha	Yogendra Kumar	Indian National Congress	Dec-1989	Apr-1991	488	–	
11	11th Vidhan Sabha	Krishan Vir Singh	Janata Dal	Jun-1991	Dec-1992	533	–	
12	12th Vidhan Sabha	Daya Sindhu Shankhdar	Bharatiya Janata Party	Dec-1993	Oct-1995	693	–	
13	13th Vidhan Sabha	Yogendra Kumar	Samajwadi Party	Oct-1996	May-2002	1,967	–	
14	14th Vidhan Sabha	Yogendra Kumar	Samajwadi Party	Feb-2002	May-2007	1,902	–	
15	15th Vidhan Sabha	Umlesh Yadav	Rashtriya Parivartan Dal	March 2007	October 2011			
16	16th Vidhan Sabha	Ashutosh Maurya	Samajwadi Party	Mar-2012	March 2017			
17	17th Vidhan Sabha	Kushagra Sagar	Bharatiya Janata Party	Mar-2017	Mar-2022			
18	18th Vidhan Sabha	Ashutosh Maurya	Samajwadi Party	Mar-2022	Incumbent			

== Election results ==
=== 2027 ===
2027 Uttar Pradesh Legislative Assembly election: Bisauli
Party	Candidate	Votes	%	±%
INDIA				
NDA				
BSP				
NOTA	None of the above			
Majority				
Turnout				
gain from		Swing		

=== 2022 ===
2022 Uttar Pradesh Legislative Assembly election: Bisauli
Party	Candidate	Votes	%	±%
SP	Ashutosh Maurya	110,569	44.23	+5.1
BJP	Kushagra Sagar	108,735	43.5	−0.29
BSP	Jaipal Singh	23,454	9.38	−4.77
NOTA	None of the above	1,787	0.71	−0.32
Majority		1,834	0.73	−3.93
Turnout		249,964	59.34	+0.27
SP gain from BJP		Swing		

=== 2017 ===
2017 Uttar Pradesh Legislative Assembly Election: Bisauli
Party	Candidate	Votes	%	±%
BJP	Kushagra Sagar	100,287	43.79	
SP	Ashutosh Maurya	89,599	39.13	
BSP	Major Kailash Sagar	32,398	14.15	
NOTA	None of the above	2,342	1.03	
Majority		10,688	4.66	
Turnout		228,995	59.07	

=== 2012 ===
2012 General Elections: Bisauli
Party	Candidate	Votes	%	±%
SP	Ashutosh Maurya	89,457	44.33	–
BSP	Priti Sagar	46,467	23.02	–
BJP	Major Kailash Sagar	40,866	20.25	–
	Remainder 10 candidates	25,023	12.4	–
Majority		42,990	21.3	–
Turnout		201,813	57.85	–
SP hold		Swing		

== See also ==
- Budaun district
- Badaun Lok Sabha constituency
- Sixteenth Legislative Assembly of Uttar Pradesh
- Uttar Pradesh Legislative Assembly
- Vidhan Bhawan
