= Rajendra Prasad (disambiguation) =

Rajendra Prasad (1884–1963) was the first President of India.

Rajendra Prasad may also refer to:

- Rajendra Prasad (actor) (born 1956), Indian actor in Telugu cinema
- Rajendra Prasad (boxer) (born 1968), boxer from India
- Rajendra Prasad (filmmaker) (born 1966), Indian cinematographer, writer, director and producer
- Rajendra Prasad (pulmonologist), chest physician and professor of pulmonary medicine
- Rajendra Prasad Shukla (1930–2006), politician from Madhya Pradesh
- K. P. Rajendra Prasad, Indian politician from Tamil Nadu
- V. B. Rajendra Prasad (1932–2015), Indian film producer in Telugu cinema
- Rajendra Persaud (born 1963), English consultant psychiatrist, broadcaster and author of books about psychiatry
