= D. P. Yadav =

Indian criminal and politician

Dharam Pal Yadav (D. P. Yadav)

Member (MLA) of Uttar Pradesh Legislative Assembly
- In office 2007–2012
- Preceded by: Omkar Singh Yadav
- Succeeded by: Omkar Singh Yadav
- Constituency: Sahaswan
- In office 1989–1996
- Preceded by: S. Hasan
- Succeeded by: Mahendra Singh Yadav
- Constituency: Bulandshahr

Member of Parliament (MP) in Rajya Sabha
- In office 1998–2004
- Constituency: Uttar Pradesh

Member of Parliament (MP) in Lok Sabha
- In office 1996–1998
- Preceded by: Sripal Singh Yadav
- Succeeded by: Mulayam Singh Yadav
- Constituency: Sambhal

Personal details
- Born: 25 July 1948 (age 78) Sarfabad village, Gautam Buddha Nagar district, Uttar Pradesh
- Party: Rashtriya Parivartan Dal (RPD)
- Spouse: Umlesh Yadav (m. 1968)
- Children: 4 (2 daughters and 2 sons including Vikas Yadav)
- Parent: Tej Pal Singh Yadav (father)
- Education: Banaras Hindu University

Dharam Pal Yadav, also known as D. P. Yadav, is an Indian politician and a former cabinet minister in the Government of Uttar Pradesh. He belongs to Sarfabad village of Noida in Gautam Buddha Nagar district. D. P. Yadav has served 4 times as MLA (three times from Bulandshahr and once from Sahaswan). He was also a Member of Parliament (MP) in Lok Sabha (representing Sambhal) and MP in Rajya Sabha (representing Uttar Pradesh).

== Early life ==
D.P. Yadav comes from a farming family from Sarfabad village near Sector-73, Noida of Uttar Pradesh. He is son of Tejpal Yadav who ran a dairy in Jagdish Nagar. Yadav was born on 25 July 1948.

== Career ==
=== 1980–2000 ===
Inspired to enter politics from the very early days of his life, D.P. Yadav befriended Mulayam Singh Yadav and contested the 1989 Uttar Pradesh Assembly elections from Bulandshahr on the Janata Dal ticket. He won the election of MLA and became a cabinet minister under the Chief Ministership of Mulayam Singh Yadav.

He also won the next 2 consecutive elections from Bulandshahr and remained as MLA till 1996.

He unsuccessfully fought 1991 General election on Janata Party ticket from Sambhal and got 18.88% votes. Later he changed gears and joined Bahujan Samaj Party (BSP) to contest 1996 general elections of Lok Sabha. BSP fielded him from the Sambhal constituency of Uttar Pradesh. He won the election and became a Member of Parliament (MP).

Again in 1998 he fought the same Sambhal Lok Sabha seat on Bharatiya Janata Party (BJP) ticket but lost to Mulayam Singh Yadav. He was Member of Parliament (MP) in Rajya Sabha from 1998 to 2004.

=== 2000–present ===
DP Yadav fought the 2004 Lok Sabha election from Sambhal, but lost to Ram Gopal Yadav. In 2009, he contested from Badaun, but lost to Dharmendra Yadav by around 32,000 votes. He contested the 2014 Lok Sabha election from Ghazipur and Sambhal, but he lost from both seats.

In 2007, he formed the party Rashtriya Parivartan Dal (RPD), and two members were elected to the state legislature — himself from Sahaswan, and his wife Umlesh Yadav from Bisauli.

DP Yadav lost the 2012 Assembly election from Sahaswan to Omkar Singh Yadav. His wife Umlesh Yadav fought the same seat in 2017 election and lost to Omkar Yadav.

== Personal life and family ==
He is married to Umlesh Yadav who was an MLA of Bisauli, Uttar Pradesh from 2007 to 2012. Umlesh Yadav was disqualified by the Election Commission of India in October 2011 for not declaring election expenses. The couple have 2 daughters including Bharti Yadav and 2 sons: Kunal Yadav and Vikas Yadav.

DP Yadav is the father of Vikas Yadav, convicted murderer of Nitish Katara in 2002, and convicted in the murder of Jessica Lal in 1999. The murder of Katara was perpetrated because his daughter Bharti Yadav had fallen in love with Nitish. Bharti Yadav got married on 1 November 2009 to a Gurgaon-based businessman Yatin Rao, who is a son of a Haryana government officer.

His son Kunal Singh Yadav contested the Sahaswan seat in 2022 on Rashtriya Parivartan Dal ticket but he lost the election to a Samajwadi Party candidate.

In 2007, his family's declared assets of ₹26 crores made them one of the richest political families in Uttar Pradesh at that time. These are only his declared assets – his fortune is estimated to be well over Rs. 500 crores.

== Criminal activities ==
DP Yadav became a bootlegger and entered the illegal country liquor trade as a protégé of ex-MLA of Dadri Mahendra Singh Bhati in the late 1970s. Yadav was then the Block Pramukh (village council chief) of Bisrakh in Ghaziabad (now in Noida). The first criminal charge against Yadav was registered in 1979 in the Kavi Nagar police station of Ghaziabad.

He has been charged in nine murder cases, three cases of attempted murder, two cases of dacoity, many cases of kidnapping for extortion, as well as various crimes under the Excise Act, Gangsters' Act, and even the Terrorist and Disruptive Activities Act.

The cases were filed in the districts of Ghaziabad, Bulandshahr, Moradabad, Badayun, in western Uttar Pradesh, and in Jind and Sirsa districts in Haryana. In one of the cases filed against him in Haryana in the early 1990s, illicit liquor supplied by him was responsible for the deaths of 350 people.

During the BJP regime of chief minister Kalyan Singh, he was arrested under the National Security Act. In 1992 he was accused by the Central Bureau of Investigation of murdering his erstwhile mentor, Bhati, who was at the time MLA for Dadri.

In March 2015, DP Yadav was sentenced to life in the Mahendra Singh Bhati murder case and was imprisoned in Dehradun jail. On 10 November 2021, Uttarakhand High Court acquitted him due to lack of evidence in the murder of former Dadri MLA Mahendra Bhati.

As per his 2014 Lok Sabha election affidavit he has 5 serious criminal cases against him including murder, attempt-to-murder and extortion cases. In the same affidavit he has mentioned that he has assets worth ₹59.51 crores and liabilities worth ₹8.78 crores.

== Positions held ==
Dharam Pal Yadav (DP Yadav) has been elected 4 times as MLA and 1 time as Lok Sabha MP.

#	From	To	Position	Party
1.	1989	1991	MLA (1st term) from Bulandshahr	Janata Dal
2.	1991	1993	MLA (2nd term) from Bulandshahr	Janata Party (S)
3.	1993	1996	MLA (3rd term) from Bulandshahr	SP
4.	1996	1998	MP (1st term) in 11th Lok Sabha from Sambhal	BSP
5.	1998	2004	MP (1st term) in Rajya Sabha from Uttar Pradesh	BJP
6.	2007	2012	MLA (4th term) from Sahaswan	RPD
