= Kushagra Sagar =

Indian politician

MLA, 17th Legislative Assembly
- In office 2017–2022
- Preceded by: Ashutosh Maurya
- Succeeded by: Ashutosh Maurya
- Constituency: Bisauli, Budaun district

Personal details
- Party: Bharatiya Janata Party
- Parent: Yogendra Sagar
- Occupation: MLA
- Profession: Politician

Kushagra Sagar is an Indian politician and a member of 17th Legislative Assembly of Bareilly of India. He represented the Bisauli constituency of Uttar Pradesh from 2017 to 2022. He is a member of the Bharatiya Janata Party. In 2022, he was again nominated for the elections but he lost the elections by 1,834 votes only.

== Political career ==
Sagar has been a member of the 17th Legislative Assembly of Uttar Pradesh. Since 2017, he has represented the Bisauli constituency and is a member of the BJP.

== Posts held ==
#	From	To	Position	Comments
01	2017	Incumbent	Member, 17th Legislative Assembly	

== See also ==
- Uttar Pradesh Legislative Assembly
