= Ughaiti =

- Village
- Location within Uttar Pradesh Location within India
- Coordinates: 28.229°N 78.808°E
- Country: India
- State: Uttar Pradesh
- District: Badaun
- Elevation: 167 m (548 ft)
- Time zone: UTC+5:30 (IST)
- PIN: 243724
- Vehicle registration: UP 24

Ughaiti is a Village or a Gram panchayat. It is Located in the Sahaswan Block and Bilsi tehsil in Badaun district, Uttar Pradesh, India. It belongs to Bareilly Division

== Geography ==
Ughaiti Uttar Pradesh is strategically located 35 km towards west from district headquarters Badaun. 292 km from state capital Lucknow and is well connected by road. It is situated on State Highway no. 51 Badaun - Bijnor.

== Facilities ==
- Police Station
- Power House
- Post Office
- Sarva U.P. Gramin Bank
- Indian Oil Petrol Pump
- Madhav Ram Inter College
- Hanswahini Inter College
- Government Veterinary Hospital Ughaiti Garvi

Chaudhary Chirag Singla jim Krishi Kendra Khokhar complex
