= Onkar =

Onkar may refer to:

- Om, the sacred Hindu syllable or mantra
- Ik Onkar, the sacred Sikh symbol

== People ==
- Onkar Bhojne, Indian actor and comedian
- Onkar Kanwar, Indian businessman
- Onkar Nath Srivastava (1942–2021), Indian physicist
- Onkar Rai, Kenyan racing driver
- Onkar Raut (born 1990), Indian actor
- Onkar Sahota, British politician
- Onkar Sahu, Indian politician
- Onkar Singh, Indian engineering professor
- Onkar Singh, Indian politician
- Onkar Singh Kalkat, Indian military officer
- Onkar Singh Lakhawat (born 1949), Indian politician
