= Kakora =

Village in Budaun, Uttar Pradesh

- Village
- Location in Uttar Pradesh, India
- Coordinates: 27.8748°N 79.0536°E
- Country: India
- State: Uttar Pradesh
- District: Badaun

Population (2011)
  - Total: 11,271

Languages
  - Official: Hindi
- Time zone: UTC+5:30 (IST)
- PIN: 243601
- Vehicle registration: UP 24

Kakora is a village in Budaun Tehsil and Budaun district, Uttar Pradesh, India. Its village code is 128608. The village is administrated by Gram Panchayat.

Kakora is also known for Mela Kakora Ganga Snan at the river of Ganga.
