= Omkar Singh Yadav =

Indian politician

MLA, Legislative Assembly of Uttar Pradesh
- In office March 2017 – March 2022
- Succeeded by: Brajesh Yadav
- In office March 2012 – March 2017
- Preceded by: D. P. Yadav
- In office February 2002 – May 2007
- Succeeded by: D. P. Yadav
- In office 1997 – 2002 (By Poll)
- Preceded by: Mulayam Singh Yadav
- In office June 1991 – December 1992
- Preceded by: Mir Mazhar Ali
- Succeeded by: Mir Mazhar Ali
- Constituency: Sahaswan (Assembly constituency)

Personal details
- Born: 5 January 1951 (age 75) Budaun district
- Died: 09/07/2026 Village- Singhaula, (Paternal House) in Badaun District
- Party: Samajwadi Party
- Other political affiliations: Janata Dal
- Parent: Nem Singh Yadav (father)
- Education: University of Lucknow
- Profession: Farmer, lawyer, politician

Omkar Singh Yadav is an Indian politician and a member of the Sixteenth Legislative Assembly of Uttar Pradesh in India. He represents the Sahaswan constituency of Uttar Pradesh and is a member of the Samajwadi Party political party.

== Early life and education ==
Omkar Singh Yadav was born in Budaun district . He attended the University of Lucknow and completed Bachelor of Laws degree.

== Political career ==
Omkar Singh Yadav has been a MLA for five terms. He represented the Sahaswan constituency and is a member of the Samajwadi Party political party.

== Posts held ==
#	From	To	Position	Comments
01	2017	Incumbent	Member, 17th Legislative Assembly	
02	2012	2017	Member, 16th Legislative Assembly	
03	2002	2007	Member, 14th Legislative Assembly	
04	1997	2002	Member, 13th Legislative Assembly	
05	1991	1992	Member, 11th Legislative Assembly	

== See also ==
- Sahaswan (Assembly constituency)
- Sixteenth Legislative Assembly of Uttar Pradesh
- Uttar Pradesh Legislative Assembly
