= Saleem Iqbal Shervani =

Indian politician

Minister of State of External Affairs Government of India
- In office 9 June 1997 – 19 March 1998
- Prime Minister: Inder Kumar Gujral
- Minister: Inder Kumar Gujral

Personal details
- Party: Samajwadi Party
- Other political affiliations: Indian National Congress

Saleem Iqbal Shervani (born 22 March 1953) is an Indian politician from the Samajwadi Party.

== Career ==
He represented Badaun constituency in Uttar Pradesh, in the 8th, 11th, 12th, 13th and 14th Lok Sabhas. A close ally of Rajiv Gandhi, he was the Union Minister of State for Health and Family Welfare from 1996 to 1997 and the Union Minister of State for External Affairs from 1997 to 1998 in the government led by the prime minister I.K. Gujral.

After the death of Indira Gandhi, Rajiv Gandhi insisted that he should fight the elections. Eventually the Badayun constituency was identified for him, and he won several elections there.

In the wake of the Babri Masjid demolition, Salim Sherwani left Congress to join Samajwadi Party. However, in the Indian general election in Uttar Pradesh, 2009, Samajwadi Party denied him a ticket in order to accommodate Mulayam Singh Yadav's nephew Dharmendra Yadav. Shervani then re-joined the Congress. He fought the election from Badayun against mafia don DP Yadav (Bahujan Samaj Party) but came third, losing to Dharmendra Yadav by 40 thousand votes.

== Positions held ==
Saleem Iqbal Shervani has been elected 5 times as Lok Sabha MP.

#	From	To	Position	Party
1.	1984	1989	MP (1st term) in 8th Lok Sabha from Badaun	INC
2.	1996	1998	MP (2nd term) in 11th Lok Sabha from Badaun, Served as Minister of External Affairs(MOS) in Cabinet of Prime Minister I.K. Gujral	SP
3.	1998	1999	MP (3rd term) in 12th Lok Sabha from Badaun	SP
4.	1999	2004	MP (4th term) in 13th Lok Sabha from Badaun	SP
5.	2004	2009	MP (5th term) in 14th Lok Sabha from Badaun	SP
