= Hansigunj =

- village
- Location in Uttar Pradesh, India Hansigunj (India)
- Coordinates: 28.03°N 79.4°E
- Country: India
- State: Uttar Pradesh
- District: Badaun
- Elevation: 158 m (518 ft)

Population (2001)
  - Total: 900

Languages
  - Official: Hindi
- Time zone: UTC+5:30 (IST)

Hansigunj is a small village in Dataganj tehsil, Badaun District, Uttar Pradesh, India. There is a single primary school in this village. People of this village depend upon agriculture. Till June, 2011 there was no any supply of electricity and water. The population of this village is approx 1000. The language mainly used by people is regional Hindi.

== Geography ==
Dataganj is located at 28.03°N 79.4°E. It has an average elevation of 158 metres (518 feet).
