= Badarpur, Budaun =

- village
- Interactive map of Badarpur, Budaun
- Country: India
- State: Uttar Pradesh
- District: Badaun

Government
  - Body: Gram Panchayat

Population (2011 Census of India)
  - Total: 676

Languages
  - Official: Hindi
- Time zone: UTC+5:30 (IST)
- Postal code: 243601

Badarpur is a village in Budaun Tehsil and Budaun district, Uttar Pradesh, India. As per constitution of India and Panchyati Raaj Act Badarpur village is administrated by Gram panchayat. Badarpur is 7 kilometers away from Badaun City. There are 130 houses in Badarpur village.

== See also ==
- List of villages in India
- Budaun district
- Aam Ganv
