= Musarrat Ali Bittan =

Indian politician

Honourable Musarrat Ali Bittan

MLA, 16th Legislative Assembly
- In office March 2012 – March 2017
- Preceded by: Yogendra Sagar
- Succeeded by: Radha Krishan Sharma
- Constituency: Bilsi

Personal details
- Born: 8 July 1971 (age 55) Budaun district
- Party: Bahujan Samaj Party
- Parent: Ashid Ali (father)
- Education: P. M. Vidyalaya
- Profession: Farmer, businessperson & politician

Musarrat Ali Bittan is an Indian politician and a member of the Sixteenth Legislative Assembly of Uttar Pradesh in India. He represents the Bilsi constituency of Uttar Pradesh and is a member of the Bahujan Samaj Party political party.

== Political career ==
Musarrat Ali Bittan has been a MLA for one term. He represented the Bilsi constituency and is a member of the Bahujan Samaj Party political party.

He lost his seat in the 2017 Uttar Pradesh Assembly election to Radha Krishan Sharma of the Bharatiya Janata Party.

== Posts held ==
#	From	To	Position	Comments
01	March 2012	March 2017	Member, 16th Legislative Assembly	

== See also ==
- Bilsi (Assembly constituency)
- Sixteenth Legislative Assembly of Uttar Pradesh
- Uttar Pradesh Legislative Assembly
