= Aam Ganv =

Coordinates: 28°03′13″N 79°10′51″E

- village
- Interactive map of Aam Ganv
- Country: India
- State: Uttar Pradesh
- District: Badaun

Government
  - Body: Gram Panchayat

Population (2011 Census of India)
  - Total: 2,234

Languages
  - Official: Hindi
- Time zone: UTC+5:30 (IST)
- Postal code: 243601

Aam Ganv is a village in Badaun Tehsil and Budaun district, Uttar Pradesh, India. Aam Ganv village is administrated by Gram panchayat who is elected by the residents of that village. This village comes in the Jagat block of the district.The total geographical area of the village is 536.58 hectares. There are 398 houses in Aam Ganv village.Narendra Kumar is the present "Panchayat Head" of the Village.
