= Era University =

Private university in Uttar Pradesh

Era University, Lucknow
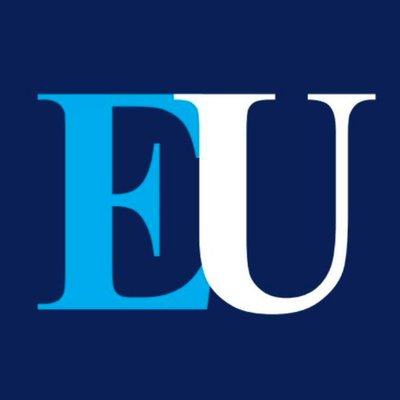
- Motto: Nurture, Pursue and Celebrate Excellence
- Type: Private
- Established: 2016
- Affiliations: UGC
- Chancellor: Mohsin Ali Khan
- Vice-Chancellor: Dr. Abbas Ali Mahdi
- Location: Sarfarazganj, Hardoi Road,, Lucknow, Uttar Pradesh, 226003, India; 26.878235°N 80.872679°E
- Campus: Urban
- Language: English, Hindi
- Website: https://www.erauniversity.in/

Era University is a private university established in 2016 by the Era Educational Trust in Lucknow, Uttar Pradesh. The university offer courses in the fields of medical and allied and paramedical sciences, nursing, pharmacy, basic science, biotechnology, Molecular Medicine, food and nutrition, liberal arts, MHA and computer application. It is the parent institute of Era's Lucknow Medical College.

== Notable faculty ==
- Rajendra Prasad, Dr. B. C. Roy Award laureate (2010)

== Location ==
The University campus is located at Sarfarazganj, Hardoi Road, Lucknow.
