= Aditya Yadav =

Indian politician (born 1988)

Member of Parliament, Lok Sabha
- Incumbent
- Assumed office 4 June 2024
- Preceded by: Sanghmitra Maurya
- Constituency: Badaun, Uttar Pradesh

Personal details
- Born: 12 June 1988 (age 38) Lucknow, Uttar Pradesh, India
- Party: Samajwadi Party
- Spouse: Rajlaxmi Singh Yadav (m. 2016)
- Relations: Mulayam Singh Yadav (uncle); Akhilesh Yadav (cousin); Dharmendra Yadav (cousin); Dimple Yadav (sister-in-law)
- Parent: Shivpal Singh Yadav (father)
- Education: University of Lucknow
- Profession: Politician

Aditya "Ankur" Yadav (born 12 June 1988; Hindi pronunciation: [aːd̪ɪt̪jə jaːd̪əʋ]) is an Indian politician and the Member of Parliament, Lok Sabha from Badaun Lok Sabha constituency. He is affiliated with the Samajwadi Party.

== Political career ==
In the 2024 Indian general election, he won from Badaun Lok Sabha constituency seat by defeating Durvijay Singh Shakya (BJP) by a margin of 35,067 votes.

== Early life and education ==
Yadav was born in 1988 to Sarla Yadav and Shivpal Singh Yadav.

He did his schooling from La Martinière College, Lucknow and attended University of Lucknow for B.B.A. and Master of Tourism Administration degrees which he completed in 2012 and 2014 respectively.

== Personal life ==
Yadav was married to Rajlaxmi Singh Yadav on 10 March 2016.

== Educational organizations ==
He is part of management committee of two private schools and three private colleges, these include S.S. Memorial Senior Secondary Public School, Saifai; Sughar Singh Memorial Shiksha Niketan Inter College, Saifai; S.S. Memorial Mahavidyalaya, Takha; S.S. Memorial Educational Academy, Saifai and S.S. Memorial College of Pharmacy, Saifai.

== See also ==
- 18th Lok Sabha
