= Raghubir Sahai =

Indian politician

Member of Parliament, Lok Sabha
- In office 1952-1962
- Succeeded by: Onkar Singh
- Constituency: Badaun, Uttar Pradesh

Personal details
- Born: March 1896 Budaun, North-Western Provinces, British India, (now Uttar Pradesh)
- Party: Indian National Congress
- Spouse: Saraswati Devi

Raghubir Sahai was an Indian politician. He was elected to the Lok Sabha, the lower house of the Parliament of India from Badaun, Uttar Pradesh as a member of the Indian National Congress.
