= Mahendra Singh Bhati =

Indian politician

Member (MLA) of Uttar Pradesh Legislative Assembly
- In office 1985–1992
- Preceded by: Vijay Pal
- Succeeded by: Sameer Bhati
- Constituency: Dadri

Personal details
- Died: 13 September 1992
- Party: Janata Dal
- Spouse: Mridula Bhati
- Children: Sameer Bhati; Nishith Singh Bhati; Devyani Singh
- Profession: Politician

Mahendra Singh Bhati was an Indian politician from Uttar Pradesh. He has served 3 times as MLA representing the Dadri constituency of Uttar Pradesh. Bhati along with his associate Udai Prakash Arya were shot dead by armed assailants near Dadri railway station on 13 September 1992.

Eight persons including former Rajya Sabha MP D. P. Yadav has been subjected to life imprisonment by the CBI on 28 February 2015, for killing Mahendra Bhati in 1992.
