= Kachhla =

Town in Uttar Pradesh, India

- Town
- Kachhla
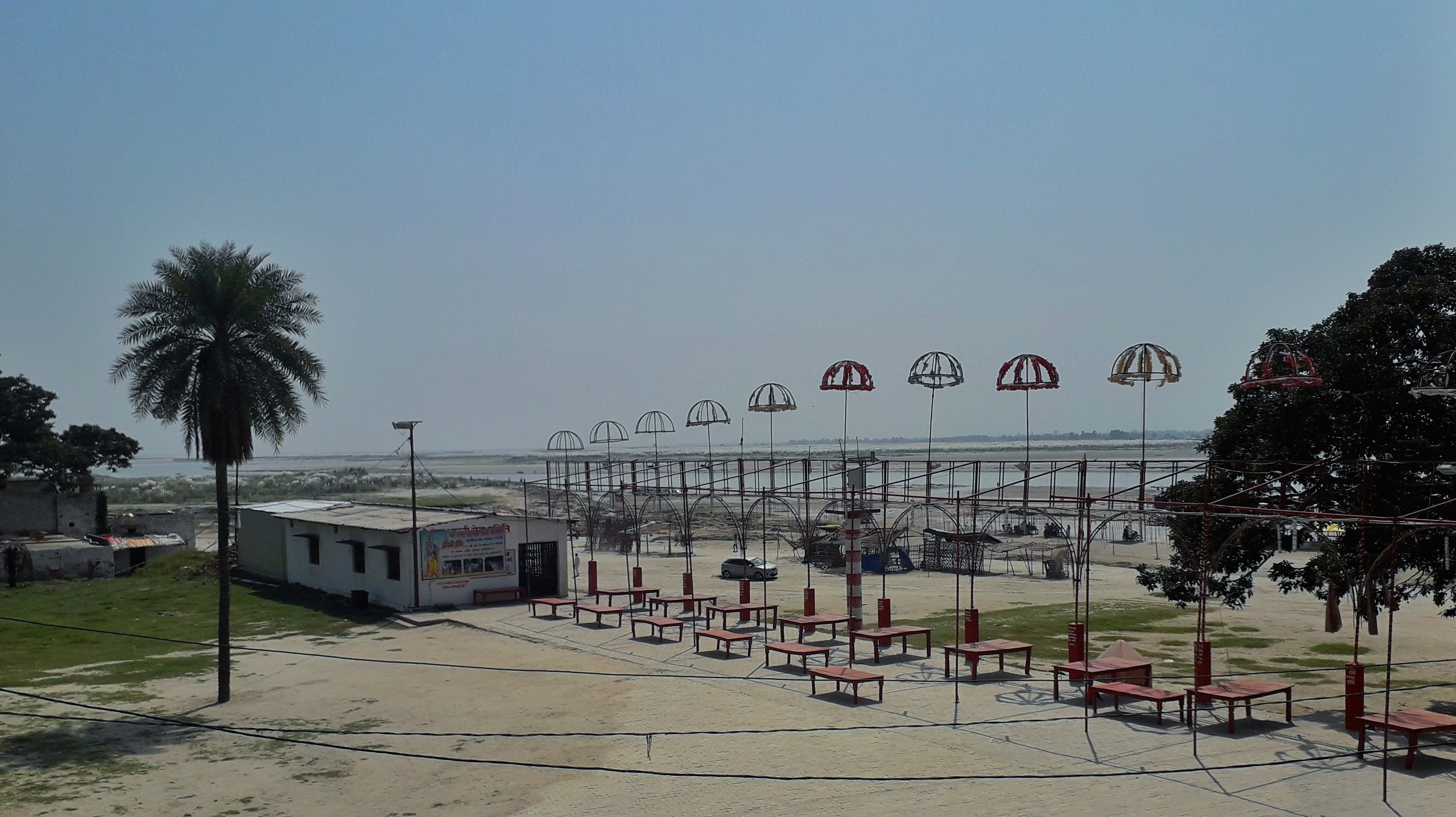
- Bhagirath Ghat on the Ganga River, Kachhla

- Location in Uttar Pradesh, India
- Coordinates: 27°58′N 78°53′E
- Country: India
- State: Uttar Pradesh
- District: Badaun

Government
  - Body: Nagar panchayat
  - Chairman: Jagdish loniya Chauhan

Area
  - Total: 6 km^{2} (2.3 sq mi)

Population (2011)
  - Total: 9,471
  - Density: 1,600/km^{2} (4,100/sq mi)

Languages
  - Official: Hindi
- Time zone: UTC+5:30 (IST)
- Postal code: 243636
- Vehicle registration: UP24
- Website: Hindi

Kachhla is a town and a nagar panchayat in Badaun district in the Indian state of Uttar Pradesh.

== Demographics ==
As of 2011 India census, Kachhla had a population of 9471. Males constitute 54% of the population and females 46%. Kachhla has an average literacy rate of 37%, lower than the national average of 59.5%: male literacy is 46%, and female literacy is 27%. In Kachhla, 19% of the population is under 6 years of age.
