= Abbas Ali Mahdi =

Indian academic

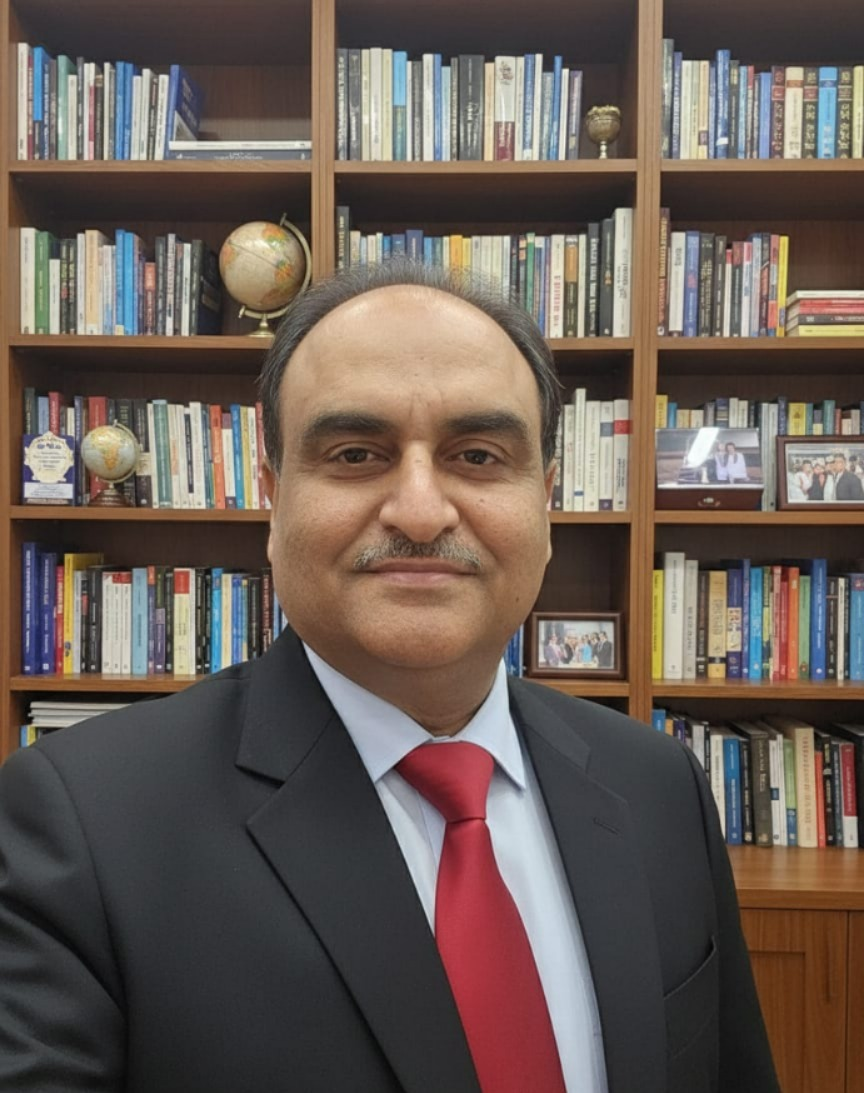
- Occupations: Vice-chancellor, Author
- Known for: Metal toxicity, Biochemistry

Academic background
- Education: M.Sc., Ph.D., D.Sc. Aligarh Muslim University

Abbas Ali Mahdi is an Indian Medical Biochemist, academic and currently Vice-chancellor of Era University.

== Education and career ==
He was Research Associate at Aligarh Muslim University from 1985 to 1991. In 2003 he joined as the associate professor at King George's Medical University and later in 2005 he became the full time professor at King George's Medical University. He worked as head of the department at King George's Medical University from 2010 to 2023.

In 2023 Mahdi became the Vice Chancellor of Era University.

== Research ==
He served as the president of Indian Academy of Biomedical Sciences from 2013 to 2014. He is also former secretary general of Indian Academy of Biomedical Sciences (IABS). He has made contributions in the fields of natural products, metal toxicity, and free radical biology.

His studies on oxidative stress–induced perturbations of antioxidant levels in the seminal plasma of infertile men indicated improvement following treatment with certain herbal preparations.

== Selected publications ==
- "Withania somnifera improves semen quality by regulating reproductive hormone levels and oxidative stress in seminal plasma of infertile males. Fertility and sterility.", Ahmad MK, Mahdi AA, Shukla KK, Islam N, Rajender S, Madhukar D, Shankhwar SN, Ahmad S., 2010, Vol:94, Issue:3, P:989-996,
- "Mucuna pruriens improves male fertility by its action on the hypothalamus–pituitary–gonadal axis. Fertility and sterility", Shukla KK, Mahdi AA, Ahmad MK, Shankhwar SN, Rajender S, Jaiswar SP, 2009, Vol:92, Issue:6, p: 1934-1940,
- "Withania somnifera Improves Semen Quality in Stress-Related Male Fertility", Mahdi AA, Shukla KK, Ahmad MK, Rajender S, Shankhwar SN, Singh V, Dalela D, 2011
- "Effect of Mucuna pruriens on semen profile and biochemical parameters in seminal plasma of infertile men", Ahmad MK, Mahdi AA, Shukla KK, Islam N, Jaiswar SP, Ahmad S, 2008, Volume:90, Issue:3, P:627-635
- Influence of age on aluminum induced lipid peroxidation and neurolipofuscin in frontal cortex of rat brain: A behavioral, biochemical and ultrastructural study", Tripathi S, Mahdi AA, Nawab A, Chander R, Hasan M, Siddiqui MS, Mahdi F, Mitra K, Bajpai VK, 2009, Volume 1253, Pages:107-116
- "Aluminium Induced Endoplasmic Reticulum Stress Mediated Cell Death in SH-SY5Y Neuroblastoma Cell Line Is Independent of p53", Mustafa Rizvi SH, Parveen A, Verma AK, Ahmad I, Arshad M, Mahdi AA, 2014

== Awards & honors ==
- In March 2024, Mahdi received a D.Sc. (h c.) from All India Institute of Medical Sciences, Bhopal.
