= Era's Lucknow Medical College =

Private medical college in Uttar Pradesh, India

- Type: Private Medical College
- Established: 1997
- Academic affiliations: Era University
- Principal: Dr. Jamal Masood
- Location: Lucknow, Uttar Pradesh, India; 26.878359°N 80.8725733°E
- Campus: Urban
- Website: elmcindia.org

Era's Lucknow Medical College is a private medical college in Lucknow, Uttar Pradesh, India, established in 1997. Till 2016, it was affiliated with Dr. Ram Manohar Lohia Avadh University. Since 2016, the college has been affiliated to the Era University.

== Notable faculty ==
- Rajendra Prasad, Dr. B. C. Roy Award laureate (2010)

== Notable alumni ==
- Sanghmitra Maurya, MP
