= Umlesh Yadav =

Indian politician from Uttar Pradesh

Member (MLA) of Uttar Pradesh Legislative Assembly
- In office 2007–2011
- Preceded by: Yogendra Kumar
- Succeeded by: Ashutosh Maurya
- Constituency: Bisauli

Personal details
- Born: 1958 (age 67–68) Uttar Pradesh
- Party: Rashtriya Parivartan Dal (RPD)
- Other political affiliations: Samajwadi Party
- Spouse: D. P. Yadav (m. 1968)
- Children: 4 (2 daughters and 2 sons including Vikas Yadav)

Umlesh Yadav (born 1958) is an Indian politician from Sarfabad village in Noida, Uttar Pradesh. She is the first politician to be disqualified by the Election Commission of India in 2011 for a period of 3 years for suppression of her election expenses incurred, when she was elected as an MLA. Umlesh was MLA representing Bisauli constituency from 2007 to 2012.

Umlesh Yadav is married to D. P. Yadav, a former Member of Parliament of Sambhal (1996–98).

== Personal life ==
Yadav is married to the politician D. P. Yadav. The Yadav family, who became wealthy through the liquor business, may be the richest political family in Uttar Pradesh, with declared net assets of ₹260 million (₹26 crores) as of 2007.

In her election affidavit of 2017, she has mentioned that her assets are worth ₹55.10 crores and liabilities are worth ₹7.95 crores.

== Family ==
She has 2 sons: Vikas Yadav and Kunal Singh Yadav and 2 daughters including Bharti Yadav.

Kunal Singh contested the Sahaswan seat in 2022 on Rashtriya Parivartan Dal ticket but he lost the election to a Samajwadi Party candidate.

Vikas Yadav is a convicted murderer of Nitish Katara, and convicted in the Jessica Lal murder case. The murder of Katara was perpetrated because her daughter Bharti Yadav had fallen in love with Nitish. Bharti Yadav got married on 1 November 2009 to a Gurgaon-based businessman Yatin Rao, who is a son of a Haryana government officer.

== Paid News ==
In October 2011, the Election Commission of India disqualified Yadav, the sitting MLA from Bisauli in Uttar Pradesh, under Section 10-A of the Representation of the People Act 1951 for a period of three years for failing to provide a "true and correct account" of her election expenses. She had failed to include in her official poll accounts the amount she spent on advertisements, dressed up as news, in two Hindi dailies, Dainik Jagran and Amar Ujala, during her 2007 election campaign.

The case arose out of an adjudication by the Press Council of India on the complaint of a losing candidate against the two dailies for publishing paid news. After holding the newspapers "guilty of ethical violations" and issuing a caution to them, the Council sent its adjudication to the ECI "for such action as deemed fit by them".

No sitting MP or MLA before Umlesh Yadav, who is married to liquor baron and politician D. P. Yadav, has ever been disqualified by the ECI on grounds of excessive expenditure – and certainly none on account of paid news. This is also the first verdict in the paid news saga – a scandal that has hurt the credibility of the Indian news media and demoralised journalists. In its 23-page order, the ECI made the wider and vital observation that "by suppressing expenditure on 'paid news' and filing an incorrect or false account, the candidate involved is guilty of not merely circumventing the law relating to election expenses but also of resorting to false propaganda by projecting a wrong picture and defrauding the electorate".
