= Onkar Singh (politician) =

Indian politician

J. S. Onkar Singh is a former Indian politician. He represented Badaun Lok Sabha constituency in Uttar Pradesh from 1977 to 1980. His party was the Bharatiya Lok Dal.
