= Murder of Nitish Katara =

2002 Indian murder case

Nitish Katara (1978 – 17 February 2002)

Nitish Katara was a 23-year-old Indian business executive in Delhi who was murdered in the early hours of 17 February 2002 by Vikas Yadav. Yadav was the son of an influential politician D. P. Yadav. Katara had recently graduated from the Institute of Management Technology in Ghaziabad, where he had fallen in love with his classmate Bharti Yadav, sister of Vikas Yadav. The trial court held that Katara's murder was an honour killing because the family did not approve of their relationship. Vikas and Vishal Yadav were later found guilty by the trial Court and both were given life sentences on 30 May 2008.

On 2 April 2014, the Delhi High Court upheld the trial court's verdict of life imprisonment for the accused. On 6 February 2015, Delhi High Court on re-appeal on death sentence, extended the convicts' sentence to 25 years' rigorous life imprisonment without remission. On 9 September 2015, the Supreme Court of India rejected a plea by Neelam Katara seeking enhancement of sentence to death for Vishal and Vikas Yadav. On 3 October 2016, the Supreme Court sentenced Vikas and Vishal Yadav, as well as Sukhdev Pehelwan, the third accused, to 25 years' imprisonment without remission.

The Yadav family never approved of the relationship between the two, and Katara received threats several times. However, he was an idealist and believed in "standing up to injustice". On the night of 16 February 2002, the couple attended a common friend's wedding, where Yadav's brother, Vikas, and a cousin were present as well. From there, Katara was taken for a drive by Yadav's brother Vikas Yadav and Vishal Yadav, and never returned. Three days later, Katara's body was found beside the highway; he had been battered to death with a hammer, diesel poured on him, and set aflame. Forensic pathologist T D Dogra collected the blood samples of parents for DNA profiling to establish the identity of deceased Nitish Katara at AIIMS New Delhi.

== Background ==
By 2002, Katara and Bharti Yadav were an established couple; they had been seeing each other for over four years. In her court testimony in 2006, Bharti Yadav denied any relationship beyond friendship.

In his confession to the police, Vikas Yadav stated that "The affair was damaging our family's reputation". Nitish was threatened several times, and Bharti was tense about how her family might react.

== The murder ==
On 16 February 2002, Yadav and Katara attended a friend's wedding in Ghaziabad. Bharti's mother, her brother Vikas and sister Mitalee were also there.

After the wedding, four people told of having seen Vikas Yadav and his cousin Vishal Yadav take Katara into their Tata Safari SUV. His friends thought he would be returning soon, but when they had not returned till well past midnight, Bharat Divakar, who had accompanied Nitish to the wedding in a taxi, went to their house. It was 3 am when Neelam Katara opened the door, and she immediately called Bharti. It turned out that Bharti herself was trying to find out Nitish's whereabouts. She asked Neelam "to go to the police, adding that maybe her brothers—Vikas and Vishal—had taken Nitish to Punjab". Bharti is thought to have called her sister Bhavna Yadav, whose registered mobile phone number was used all night to call many friends of the couple, as well as Neelam Katara.

Yadav also gave Neelam Katara her father's number, and after a fruitless visit to the police, at 8 in the morning, Neelam called D. P. Yadav, who did not know where Vikas or Nitish might be.

The next morning, the police found a battered and burned body at Khurja, 80 km from the wedding venue. The body had been so badly beaten that "the digestive system had fallen out". At 11 a.m., Neelam Katara filed a First Information Report. Based on initial statements by her and Bharti Yadav, warrants were issued for Vikas and Vishal.

== Arrest and confessions ==
Inspector Ashok Bhadoria arrested Vikas and Vishal Yadav in Dabra, MP, and in his original statement to the court, he said that the Yadavs had confessed having kidnapped Katara from Kavi Nagar, Ghaziabad. However, under cross-examination the inspector changed his stand saying the accused persons made no confessional statements in his presence.

Another police constable, Brij Mohan Mishra, who was at the Dabra police station where the Yadavs were brought after being arrested, said in court, "The accused persons themselves said that they had murdered Nitish Katara after kidnapping him. He added that he had told inspector Bhadoria about the disclosure, but Bhadoria 'did not produce me before any magistrate to get my statement recorded'." It was reported that Bhadoria is a business associate of D P Yadav, but he denied that this fact may have had any bearing on his actions.

After being handed over to the U.P. police, they gave a more detailed confession on having kidnapped and killed Nitish Katara, which the Police recorded on audiotape. In May 2006, the NDTV news channel managed to obtain the tape and broadcast it. In this confession, Yadav admitted to taking Katara from the party, murdering him, and burning the body. Although this confession, which was made a week or so after the murder, was not formalised before a magistrate, and was therefore not admissible as evidence in court, the fact that the hammer and watch were found based on this deposition may have weighed with the trial court when it reached its verdict.

Bharti Yadav, whose testimony was being sought in the trial, moved to London for an extended period shortly after the murder. From there, she apparently sent some e-mails to Katara's brother, which blame her father D. P. Yadav for sanctioning the murder. In her subsequent court testimony, however, she has claimed that the account was not hers.

== Witnesses and testimonies ==
=== Bharti Yadav ===
Considerable drama and media attention focused on the protracted struggle (over four-and-a-half years) to obtain the testimony of Bharti Yadav. Her reluctance to testify only highlighted media speculation that the family was worried her testimony might go against her own brother. Lawyers on her behalf made 39 appeals that she be relieved. In March 2005, the Uttar Pradesh state prosecution counsel also moved that she not be called.

Initially, Bharti told a policewoman of her love for Nitish. But in March 2002, within two weeks of this initial verbal statement, a team of the Ghaziabad police headed by Dr Dharam Veer Singh and Anil Samanya met Bharati Yadav and D. P. Yadav, at his Rajya Sabha residence. She told them that "her relationship with Nitish was like that of a classmate and there was nothing special about them."

Immediately after this, Bharti Yadav went to London to study and "was believed to have been working as a staff nurse". The family strongly resisted her being called as a witness. She could not be contacted, and repeated warrants and non-bailable warrants were not heeded to.

By March 2004, all other witnesses in the case had been examined, except for Bharti Yadav. Pressure mounted on getting Bharti Yadav to testify. After a year without success, the UP prosecuting team dropped her as a prosecution witness, which was challenged by Neelam Katara, saying that she was a material witness, and in dropping her, the prosecution may have been influenced by D. P. Yadav. Delhi prosecutor Mukta Gupta in September 2005 said that "it showed the malafide intention of the Uttar Pradesh Prosecutor to request for dropping of Bharti as witness". In October 2005, the court ruled that she was a material witness and would be required to testify.

In August 2006, the Supreme Court, responding to an appeal from Nitish Katara's mother, shifted the trial from Ghaziabad to Delhi because of D. P. Yadav's considerable influence in the area, including its administration and judiciary.

Meanwhile, despite several court warrants, Bharti still could not be traced. In May 2006, Bharti Yadav's passport was revoked by the Ministry of External Affairs, so that her stay in UK was technically illegal. Furthermore, her visa was expiring on 30 November, making it difficult for her to continue living in the UK. In May 2006, D. P. Yadav stated in court that he did not know his daughter's whereabouts.

On 22 July 2006, an application was moved by Bharti's maternal uncle Bharat Singh (a member of the UP Legislative Council), requesting that she be permitted to testify via video conferencing. However, the court turned down this request noting that "since she has chosen to stay away from the court, thereby delaying the proceedings substantially, the court was satisfied that she had absconded by avoiding appearance before the court despite having sufficient knowledge of the proceedings pending in the court where her presence as a witness was required".

In danger of being declared proclaimed offender, under which circumstance she could have been arrested and deported from London, Bharti finally returned to depose before the court. Based on her convenience, 25 November 2006 was set for her testimony, and she was assured that she would not be detained upon arrival. The trial court permitted her to testify in camera, ruling out the media, but permitting the defendant's parents, as well as Neelam Katara, to attend.

In her actual testimony, Yadav denied any romantic attachment to Katara, and said that they had simply been close friends. She also denied having sent certain emails. However, she acknowledged having sent the cards and gifts. The prosecution stated that this evidence was key in obtaining the eventual conviction, as it established motive.

=== Hostile witnesses ===
Of the four people at the wedding who had initially said they saw Nitish go into the car with Vikas, three had already withdrawn their testimony. Only Rohit Gaur, brother of Shivani Gaur, whose wedding it was, was left as having seen Vikas and Vishal taking Nitish in his car. However, on 26 September 2006, he made the following statement in court:

It is incorrect to suggest that I informed the police that on the day of the marriage, around midnight, Vishal came near Nitish Katara and had a conversation with him and took him outside where Vikas Yadav was present and that both Vikas and Vishal took Nitish in their vehicle.

He also denied having stated that Bharti and Nitish were lovers.

Another constable, Inderjeet, who had initially testified to seeing Vikas, Vishal, and Sukhdev Pehalwan with Nitish in the Tata Safari on the night of 16 February, now denied this in language remarkably similar to other retractions: "it was wrong to suggest that he had seen the three accused with the victim in a Tata Safari".

=== Ajay Katara ===
In a decision refusing bail to Sukhdev Pehalwan in April 2007, Justice B.D. Ahmed pointed to the relevance of the testimony of passerby Ajay Kumar, who had seen them on the fateful night:

Ajay Kumar who, in his Section 161 Cr. P.C. Statement, is reported to have stated that on the intervening night 16–17 February 2002, he was traveling on his two wheeler (Scooter) from 47th Battalion, PAC Quarters towards Delhi when, around 12:30 a.m. at the Hapur Toll Tax Crossing his scooter broke down. Shortly thereafter, a Tata Safari driven by the accused Vikas Yadav came from behind from the direction of Police Station Kavi Nagar, Ghaziabad and the said Vikas Yadav asked him to remove his scooter immediately. It is stated that the said Ajay Kumar saw one person who had a round face and a fair complexion and was wearing a red Kurta and who had covered his shoulder with a white shawl sitting next to Vikas Yadav in the Tata Safari. The said witness (Ajay Kumar) has also reported to have seen Vishal Yadav and the petitioner on the back seat.

In June 2007, Ajay Kumar (also referred to as Ajay Katara, but not a relative) had filed a complaint to the police that "he was under pressure to withdraw from the case" and that "his life was in danger". He was then assigned four personal security officers (PSOs) on the orders of the trial court. On 12 July 2007, two brothers, Manoj and Anuj Sharma, called him to the Mohan Nagar temple saying he could meet his separated wife there to sort out his domestic problems. Three more people were apparently waiting nearby in a car. But his wife never showed up and the Sharmas bought him some chaat. Right after eating it, Ajay suddenly took very ill, vomiting and complaining of stomach cramps. He immediately went to hospital, where he was treated for food poisoning. A case has been registered against D. P. Yadav and four others on suspicion of having poisoned Ajay Kumar.

=== Kumar Diwan ===
In July 2007, one Pawan Kumar Diwan suddenly showed up for the defence, saying that Vikas Yadav had come to his house in Karnal, at 3 am on the night of 16–17 February 2002, for attending a ceremony the following day. He also submitted photographs showing Vikas Yadav at the ceremony.

Vikas and Vishal were found guilty by the trial court on 28 May 2008. Both were awarded life imprisonment on 30 May 2008. The convicts have stated that they would appeal against the decision in the higher courts.

== Judgement ==
On 30 May 2008 New Delhi fast-track court-sentenced Vikas and Vishal Yadav to life sentences for the kidnap and murder of Nitish Katara. Both were also fined Rs. 160,000 each.

In November 2009, Vikas was granted bail to attend the arranged marriage of Bharti to a local businessman. Vikas Yadav was granted bail 66 times in the first two years of his incarceration, often with no clear reason documented. Nitish Katara's mother accused the jail authorities of colluding with Yadav's influential family and requested a formal investigation. The Delhi High Court accused Vikas Yadav of repeatedly becoming involved in criminal activities whilst out on bail, including involvement in the Jessica Lal case, as well as absconding on two occasions.

On 2 April 2014, Delhi High Court upheld the trial court verdict sentencing life imprisonment to Vikas Yadav, Vishal Yadav and the contract killer Sukhdev Pehalwan. An appeal by Katara's mother and prosecution seeking death sentence to the convicts, pending before the High Court was to be heard on 25 April 2014. The Delhi High Court on Friday 6 February 2015 sentenced Vikas Yadav and his cousin Vishal Yadav to 30 years in prison for the murder of Nitish Katara.

On 18 August 2015, Supreme Court of India upheld the High Court verdict. On 9 October 2015 Supreme Court rejected the appeal filed by the sister of Nitish Katara for death penalty of the Yadav brothers. Hon'ble Supreme Court of India upheld the conviction for 25 years.

On 3 October 2016, the Supreme Court of India sentenced Vishal and Vikas Yadav to 25 years in prison. The Delhi High Court had earlier sentenced the convicts to 25 years in jail for the murder, plus five years for destruction of evidence, with both sentences to run consecutively. However, the Supreme Court allowed their sentences to run concurrently rather than consecutively, meaning the Yadavs would spend 25 years behind bars, rather than 30. A third convict in the case, Sukhdev Pehalwan, was sentenced to 20 years in jail.

== See also ==
- Murder of Jessica Lal
- 2008 Noida double murder case
