= Ramkhiladi Singh Yadav =

Indian politician

Ramkhiladi Singh Yadav MLA

MLA, 18th Uttar Pradesh Assembly
- Incumbent
- Assumed office 10 March 2022
- Constituency: Gunnaur

MLA, 16th Legislative Assembly
- In office March 2012 – March 2017
- Preceded by: Pradeep Yadav
- Succeeded by: Ajit Kumar Yadav
- Constituency: Gunnaur

13th Legislative Assembly
- In office October 1996 – February 2002
- Preceded by: Rajesh Kumar
- Succeeded by: Ajit Kumar
- Constituency: Gunnaur

11th Legislative Assembly
- In office June 1991 – December 1992
- Preceded by: Pushpa Devi
- Succeeded by: Rajesh Kumar

Personal details
- Born: 4 March 1960 (age 66) Gunnaur
- Party: Samajwadi Party
- Other political affiliations: Janata Dal
- Parent: Kunver Sen (father)
- Education: M. J. P. Rohilkhand University
- Profession: Farmer & politician

Ramkhiladi Singh Yadav is an Indian politician and a member of the 18th Uttar Pradesh Assembly, represents the Gunnaur constituency of Uttar Pradesh and also has earlier been a member of the Sixteenth Legislative Assembly of Uttar Pradesh, represents the Gunnaur constituency of Uttar Pradesh in India. He is a member of the Samajwadi Party political party.

== Early life and education ==
Ramkhiladi Singh Yadav was born in Gunnaur. He attended the M. J. P. Rohilkhand University and attained Bachelor of Science (agriculture).

== Political career ==
Ramkhiladi Singh Yadav has been a MLA for three terms. He represented the Gunnaur constituency and is a member of the Samajwadi Party political party.

He lost his seat in the 2017 Uttar Pradesh Assembly election to Ajeet Kumar of the Bharatiya Janata Party.

== Posts held ==
#	From	To	Position	Constituency
01	2022	2027	Member, 18th Uttar Pradesh Assembly	Gunnaur
02	2012	2017	Member, 16th Legislative Assembly	Gunnaur
03	1996	2002	Member, 13th Legislative Assembly	Gunnaur
04	1991	1992	Member, 11th Legislative Assembly	Gunnaur

== See also ==
- Eleventh Legislative Assembly of Uttar Pradesh
- Gunnaur (Assembly constituency)
- Sixteenth Legislative Assembly of Uttar Pradesh
- Thirteenth Legislative Assembly of Uttar Pradesh
- Uttar Pradesh Legislative Assembly
