= Badaun Assembly constituency =

Constituency of the Uttar Pradesh legislative assembly in India

Badaun
- Constituency No. 115 for the Uttar Pradesh Legislative Assembly

Constituency details
- Country: India
- Region: North India
- State: Uttar Pradesh
- District: Badaun
- Established: 1956
- Total electors: 313,196 (2012)
- Reservation: None

Member of Legislative Assembly
- 18th Uttar Pradesh Legislative Assembly
- Incumbent Mahesh Chandra Gupta
- Party: Bharatiya Janata Party

Badaun Assembly constituency (Hindi pronunciation: [bəd̪aːjũː]) is one of the 403 constituencies of the Uttar Pradesh Legislative Assembly, India. It is a part of the Badaun district and one of the five assembly constituencies in the Badaun Lok Sabha constituency. First election in this assembly constituency was held in 1957 after the "DPACO (1956)" (delimitation order) was passed in 1956. After the "Delimitation of Parliamentary and Assembly Constituencies Order" was passed in 2008, the constituency was assigned identification number 115.

== Wards / Areas ==
Extent of Badaun Assembly constituency is KCs Binawar, Kunwargaon, Budaun MB & Kunwargaon NP of Budaun Tehsil; PCs Wazirganj, Lahra Ladpur, Sursena, Kaser Panauta, Bankota, Kallia Kazampur, Rota, Karkatpur, Gotha of 4-Satsai KC & Wazirganj NP of Bisauli Tehsil.

== Members of the Legislative Assembly ==
#	Term	Name	Party	From	To	Days	Comments	Ref
01	01st Vidhan Sabha	-	-	Mar-1952	Mar-1957	1,849	Constituency not in existence	
02	02nd Vidhan Sabha	Tika Ram	Independent	Apr-1957	Mar-1962	1,800	-	
03	03rd Vidhan Sabha	Rukum Singh	Indian National Congress	Mar-1962	Mar-1967	1,828	-	
04	04th Vidhan Sabha	M. A. Ahmad	Republic Party Of India	Mar-1967	Apr-1968	402	-	
05	05th Vidhan Sabha	Krishan Swaroop	Bharatiya Jana Sangh	Feb-1969	Mar-1974	1,832	-	
06	06th Vidhan Sabha	Purshottam Lal	Indian National Congress	Mar-1974	Apr-1977	1,153	-	
07	07th Vidhan Sabha	Krishan Swaroop	Janata Party	Jun-1977	Feb-1980	969	-	
08	08th Vidhan Sabha	Shrikrishana Goel	Indian National Congress (I)	Jun-1980	Mar-1985	1,735	-	
09	09th Vidhan Sabha	Premila Bhadwar Mehra	Indian National Congress	Mar-1985	Nov-1989	1,725	-	
10	10th Vidhan Sabha	Krishan Swaroop	Bharatiya Janata Party	Dec-1989	Apr-1991	488	-	
11	11th Vidhan Sabha	Krishan Swaroop	Bharatiya Janata Party	Jun-1991	Dec-1992	533	-	
12	12th Vidhan Sabha	Jugender Singh	Samajwadi Party	Dec-1993	Oct-1995	693	-	
13	13th Vidhan Sabha	Prem Swaroop Pathak	Bharatiya Janata Party	Oct-1996	May-2002	1,967	-	
14	14th Vidhan Sabha	Vimal Krishana Agarwal	Bahujan Samaj Party	Feb-2002	May-2007	1,902	-	
15	15th Vidhan Sabha	Mahesh Chandra Gupta	Bharatiya Janata Party	May-2007	Mar-2012	1,762	-	
16	16th Vidhan Sabha	Abid Raza Khan	Samajwadi Party	Mar-2012	Mar-2017	1,825	-	
17	17th Vidhan Sabha	Mahesh Chandra Gupta	Bhartiya Janta Party	Mar-2017	Mar-2022	-	-	
18	18th Vidhan Sabha	Mahesh Chandra Gupta	Bhartiya Janta Party	Mar-2022	Incumbent			

=== 2022 ===
Eighteenth Legislative Assembly of Uttar Pradesh

2022 Uttar Pradesh Legislative Assembly election: Badaun
Party	Candidate	Votes	%	±%
BJP	Mahesh Chandra Gupta	101,096	46.12	▲5.08
SP	Rais Ahmad	89,917	41.02	▲7.72
BSP	Rajesh Kumar Singh	23,135	10.56	▼4.78
INC	Rajni Singh	2,235	1.02	
NOTA	None of the above	1,392	0.64	▼0.07
Majority		11,179	5.1	▼2.64
Turnout		219,183	58.28	▼1.89
BJP hold		Swing		

=== 2017 ===
Seventeenth Legislative Assembly of Uttar Pradesh

2017 General Elections: Badaun
Party	Candidate	Votes	%	±%
BJP	Mahesh Chandra Gupta	87,314	41.04	
SP	Abid Raza Khan	70,847	33.3	
BSP	Bhupendra Singh	32,641	15.34	
SS	Ramsewak Singh Patel	14,576	6.85	
NOTA	None of the above	1,509	0.71	
Majority		16,467	7.74	
Turnout		212,745	60.17	
BJP gain from SP		Swing		

=== 2012 ===
Sixteenth Legislative Assembly of Uttar Pradesh

2012 General Elections: Badaun
Party	Candidate	Votes	%	±%
SP	Abid Raza Khan	62,786	32.44	−
BJP	Mahesh Chandra Gupta	47,373	24.47	−
BSP	Ramsawak Singh	44,643	23.06	−
	Remainder 11 candidates	38,764	20.03	−
Majority		15,413	7.96	−
Turnout		193,566	61.8	−
SP gain from BJP		Swing		

== Results ==
=== 2027 ===
2027 Uttar Pradesh Legislative Assembly election: Badaun
Party	Candidate	Votes	%	±%
INDIA				
NDA				
BSP				
NOTA	None of the above			
Majority				
Turnout				
gain from		Swing		

=== 2022 ===
2022 Uttar Pradesh Legislative Assembly election: Badaun
Party	Candidate	Votes	%	±%
BJP	Mahesh Chandra Gupta	101,096	46.12	▲5.08
SP	Rais Ahmad	89,917	41.02	▲7.72
BSP	Rajesh Kumar Singh	23,135	10.56	▼4.78
INC	Rajni Singh	2,235	1.02	
NOTA	None of the above	1,392	0.64	▼0.07
Majority		11,179	5.1	▼2.64
Turnout		219,183	58.28	▼1.89
BJP hold		Swing		

=== 2017 ===
2017 Uttar Pradesh Legislative Assembly election: Badaun
Party	Candidate	Votes	%	±%
BJP	Mahesh Chandra Gupta	87,314	41.04	
SP	Abid Raza Khan	70,847	33.3	
BSP	Bhupendra Singh	32,641	15.34	
SS	Ramsewak Singh Patel	14,576	6.85	
NOTA	None of the above	1,509	0.71	
Majority		16,467	7.74	
Turnout		212,745	60.17	

== See also ==
- Budaun district
- Badaun Lok Sabha constituency
- Sixteenth Legislative Assembly of Uttar Pradesh
- Uttar Pradesh Legislative Assembly
- Vidhan Bhawan
