= Bisauli =

- Town
- Location in Uttar Pradesh, India
- Coordinates: 28.32°N 78.93°E
- Country: India
- State: Uttar Pradesh
- District: Badaun
- Elevation: 182 m (597 ft)

Population (2011)
  - Total: 32,780

Languages
  - Official: Hindi
- Time zone: UTC+5:30 (IST)

Bisauli is a town and a municipal board in Badaun district in the state of Uttar Pradesh, India. It is settled on Badaun - Moradabad Highway. Bisauli is known for its temples and mosques abounding the town. Bisauli is a constituency of District Budaun. Member of Legislative Assembly from Bisauli is Ashutosh Maurya of Bharatiya Janata Party (BJP).

== Demographics ==
As of 2011 India census, Bisauli had a population of 32,780; 16.990 were male and 15,790 were female, giving a sex ratio of 929. Bisauli had an average literacy rate of 63.13%, lower than the state average of 67.68%; male literacy was 69.17% and female literacy was 56.65%. 14.08% of the population was under 6 years of age.
