= Dataganj =

- Town
- Location in Uttar Pradesh, India
- Coordinates: 28.03°N 79.4°E
- India: India
- State: Uttar Pradesh
- District: Badaun
- Elevation: 158 m (518 ft)

Population (2001)
  - Total: 21,672

Languages
  - Official: Hindi
- Time zone: UTC+5:30 (IST)
- Postal code: 243635
- Vehicle registration: UP 24
- Website: http://dataganjup.in/

Dataganj is a town and a nagar palika in Badaun district in the state of Uttar Pradesh, India.

== Demographics ==
As of 2001 India census, Dataganj had a population of 21,672. Males constitute 53% of the population and females 47%. Dataganj has an average literacy rate of 50%, lower than the national average of 59.5%: male literacy is 57% and, female literacy is 41%. In Dataganj, 20% of the population is under 6 years of age.
