= Brajesh Yadav =

Political

Member of Uttar Pradesh Legislative Assembly
- Incumbent
- Assumed office March 2022
- Preceded by: Omkar Singh Yadav
- Constituency: Sahaswan

Personal details
- Political party: Samajwadi Party
- Profession: Politician

Brajesh Yadav is an Indian politician and member of the Legislative Assembly of Uttar Pradesh, representing the Sahaswan constituency. In 2022, Brijesh Yadav of the Samajwadi Party won the seat by defeating Haji Vittan Musarrat from Bahujan Samaj Party.
