= Rajendra Prasad (pulmonologist) =

Indian physician (born 1950)

Dr. Rajendra Prasad
- Born: February 17, 1950 (age 76); Basti, Uttar Pradesh
- Title: Professor, doctor
- Awards: Dr. B. C. Roy Award

Academic background
- Education: King George's Medical University

Academic work
- Institutions: ERA's Lucknow Medical College; Vallabhbhai Patel Chest Institute; Uttar Pradesh University of Medical Sciences; King George's Medical University
- Website: http://www.drrajendraprasad.com

Rajendra Prasad is a chest physician and professor of Pulmonary Medicine based in Lucknow. He received MBBS (1974) and MD (1979) degrees from King George's Medical College, Lucknow. After some time he joined same institution as faculty member and later became head of department of Pulmonary Medicine department of King George's Medical University. He also worked as director of Uttar Pradesh University of Medical Sciences and Vallabhbhai Patel Chest Institute (University of Delhi). Now, he is working as Director Medical Education and Professor & Head of Department, Pulmonary Medicine of Era University's ERA's Lucknow Medical College and also doing private practice at his clinic at Lucknow's Aliganj area.

== Awards ==
- Dr. B. C. Roy Award by the Medical Council of India (2010)
