= Radha Krishan Sharma =

Indian politician

Radha Sharma

MLA, 17th Legislative Assembly
- In office 2017–2022
- Constituency: Bilsi, Uttar Pradesh
- In office 2007–2012
- Constituency: Aonla, Uttar Pradesh

Personal details
- Party: Samajwadi Party
- Other political affiliations: Bharatiya Janata Party till 2022
- Occupation: MLA
- Profession: Politician

Radha Krishan Sharma is an Indian politician and a member of 17th Legislative Assembly, Uttar Pradesh of India. He represents the ‘Bilsi’ constituency in Badaun district of Uttar Pradesh.

== Political career ==
Radha Krishan Sharma contested Uttar Pradesh Assembly Election as Bharatiya Janata Party candidate and defeated his close contestant Musarrat Ali Bittan from Bahujan Samaj Party with a margin of 26,979 votes.

== Posts held ==
#	From	To	Position	Comments
01	2017	2022	Member, 17th Legislative Assembly	Bilsi
01	2007	2012	Member, 15th Legislative Assembly	Aonla
