= Dharmendra Yadav =

Indian politician (born 1979)

- धर्मेन्द्र यादव

Member of Parliament, Lok Sabha
- Incumbent
- Assumed office 4 June 2024
- Preceded by: Dinesh Lal Yadav
- Constituency: Azamgarh, Uttar Pradesh
- In office 16 May 2009 – 23 May 2019
- Preceded by: Saleem Iqbal Shervani
- Succeeded by: Sanghmitra Maurya
- Constituency: Badaun, Uttar Pradesh
- In office 13 May 2004 – 16 May 2009
- Preceded by: Mulayam Singh Yadav
- Succeeded by: Mulayam Singh Yadav
- Constituency: Mainpuri, Uttar Pradesh

Personal details
- Born: 3 February 1979 (age 47) Saifai, Uttar Pradesh, India
- Party: Samajwadi Party
- Spouse: Neelam Yadav (m. 2010)
- Relations: Mulayam Singh Yadav (uncle); Shivpal Singh Yadav (uncle); Akhilesh Yadav (cousin); Tej Pratap Singh Yadav (nephew); Aditya Yadav (cousin); Akshay Yadav (cousin)
- Children: 2
- Education: University of Allahabad
- Profession: Politician
- Website: www.samajwadiparty.in

Dharmendra Yadav (born 3 February 1979) is an Indian politician from Uttar Pradesh. He is a Member of Parliament (MP) in the 18th Lok Sabha representing Azamgarh constituency as Samajwadi Party candidate.

== Early life and education ==
Dharmendra Yadav was born in Saifai, Etawah on 3 February 1979 to Abhay Ram Singh Yadav and Jay Devi.

His father Abhay Ram Singh Yadav is the younger brother of Mulayam Singh Yadav and elder brother of Shivpal Singh Yadav. Samajwadi Party's President Akhilesh Yadav is Dharmendra's cousin.

He received a Bachelor of Laws degree and a MA degree in political Science from the University of Allahabad.

=== Family ===
He has one brother Anurag Yadav and two sisters Sandhya Singh Yadav and Sheela Yadav. Sheela's son Rahul Yadav is married to Dr Isha Yadav, daughter of Sadhu Yadav.

His brother Anurag Yadav contested and lost the 2017 UP assembly election from Sarojini Nagar Assembly constituency.

== Personal life ==
Dharmendra Yadav married Neelam Yadav on 12 February 2010. He has three criminal cases and as of 2019 and assets worth Rs 12 crore. He was an active participant in student politics in his university days. Mr Yadav became the block president of Samajwadi Party in Saifai in 2003.

He was elected to the 14th Lok Sabha in 2004 from Mainpuri and re-elected to the 15th Lok Sabha in 2009 and 16th Lok Sabha in 2014 from Badaun. He has been a member of the standing committees on defence, rural development, information technology and agriculture.

He lost the 2019 Lok Sabha election from Badaun by around 18,000 votes. In June 2022 Azamgarh by-poll he lost the election by around 8,600 votes.

He has been elected to the 18th Lok Sabha in 2024 from Azamgarh by defeating rival over 1,61,035 votes.

== Positions held ==
Dharmendra Yadav has been elected 4 times as Lok Sabha MP.

#	From	To	Positions	Party
1.	2004	2009	MP (1st term) in 14th Lok Sabha from Mainpuri (by-poll)	SP
2.	2009	2014	MP (2nd term) in 15th Lok Sabha from Badaun	SP
3.	2014	2019	MP (3rd term ) in 16th Lok Sabha from Badaun	SP
4.	2024	Present	MP (4th term ) in 18th Lok Sabha from Azamgarh	SP
