= Sanghmitra Maurya =

Indian politician (born 1985)

Member of Parliament, Lok Sabha
- In office 23 May 2019 – 24 June 2024
- Preceded by: Dharmendra Yadav
- Succeeded by: Aditya Yadav
- Constituency: Badaun

Personal details
- Born: 3 January 1985 (age 41) Allahbad, Uttar Pradesh, India
- Party: Bharatiya Janata party
- Other political affiliations: Bahujan Samaj Party
- Spouse: Naval Kishore Shakya (div. 2021)
- Children: 1 son
- Parent: Swami Prasad Maurya (father)
- Education: ERA's Lucknow Medical College, Dr. Ram Manohar Lohia Avadh University (M.B.B.S.)
- Profession: Politician

Sanghmitra Maurya (born 3 January 1985) is an Indian politician senior bjp leader and a member of the 17th Lok Sabha. She was elected to the Lok Sabha, the lower house of the Parliament of India from Badaun, Uttar Pradesh, in the 2019 Indian general election as a member of the Bharatiya Janata Party, defeating senior Samajwadi Party leader Dharmendra Yadav. She earlier contested in Mainpuri in 2014 as a member of the Bahujan Samaj Party but lost to Mulayam Singh Yadav.

The BJP party did not give Sanghmitra Maurya a ticket for the 2024 Indian general election because of her father's feud with the party. Party selected Durvijay Singh Shakya who is current president of Budaun Braj Region.

== Personal life ==
Maurya was born on 3 January 1985 in Allahabad city in Uttar Pradesh to politicians Swami Prasad Maurya and Shiva Maurya. She is a practitioner of Buddhism. Her family converted to Buddhism from Hinduism. She did her M.B.B.S in 2010 from ERA's Lucknow Medical College, Lucknow, then under Dr. Ram Manohar Lohia Avadh University. Her husband, Dr. Naval Kishore Shakya is a Cancer Surgeon and owner of Lakshaya Cancer Hospital Lucknow who joined Samajwadi Party in 2018. They have a son. Due to irrevocable differences, Maurya filed for divorce on 21 December 2017 in Lucknow and she was granted a divorce on 19 January 2021.

== See also ==
- Sangh Priya Gautam
