= Ashutosh Maurya =

Indian politician

Ashutosh Maurya आशुतोष मौर्या
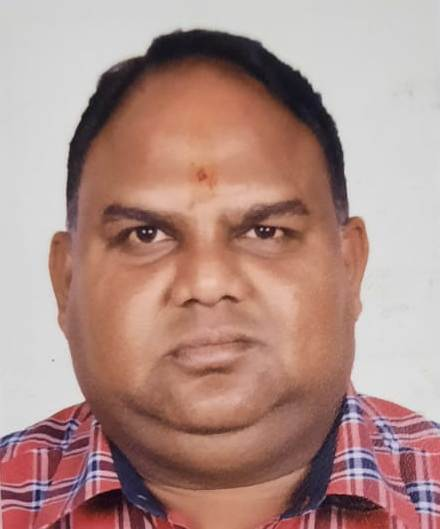

MLA, 16th Legislative Assembly
- Incumbent
- Assumed office March 2022
- Preceded by: Kushagra Sagar
- Constituency: Bisauli
- In office 2012–2017
- Preceded by: Umlesh Yadav
- Succeeded by: Kushagra Sagar
- Constituency: Bisauli

MLA, 18th Legislative Assembly

Personal details
- Born: 2 March 1976 (age 50) Budaun district
- Party: Samajwadi Party
- Parent: Bhola Shankar Maurya (father)
- Education: Madhyamik Shiksha Parishad
- Profession: Farmer, politician

Ashutosh Maurya (Hindi: आशुतोष मौर्या) (alias Raju) is an Indian politician and a member of the Sixteenth Legislative Assembly of Uttar Pradesh in India. He represents the Bisauli constituency of Uttar Pradesh and is a member of the Samajwadi Party political party. He belongs to Dalit community so he represents Bisauli which is reserved for Schedule Caste.

== Political career ==
Ashutosh Maurya has been a MLA for one term. He represented the Bisauli constituency and is a member of the Samajwadi Party political party.

He lost his seat in the 2017 Uttar Pradesh Assembly election to Kushagra Sagar of the Bharatiya Janata Party.

== Posts held ==
#	From	To	Position	Comments
01	March 2012	March 2017	Member, 16th Legislative Assembly	

== See also ==
- Bisauli (Assembly constituency)
- Sixteenth Legislative Assembly of Uttar Pradesh
- Uttar Pradesh Legislative Assembly
