= Bilsi =

- Town
- Locatiohhn in Uttar Pradesh, India Bilsi (India)
- Coordinates: 28.13°N 78.92°E
- Country: India
- State: Uttar Pradesh
- District: Badaun

Government
  - Body: Nagar Palika Parishad
  - Chairman: Anuj Varshney

Area
  - Total: 361 km^{2} (139 sq mi)
- Elevation: 180 m (590 ft)

Population (2010)
  - Total: 26,320
  - Density: 72.9/km^{2} (189/sq mi)

Languages
  - Official: Hindi
- Time zone: UTC+5:30 (IST)
- Postal code: 243633
- Area code: 05833
- Vehicle registration: UP- 24
- Website: up.gov.in

Bilsi is a town and a municipal board in Badaun district in the state of Uttar Pradesh, India. It is located to the southwest of Bareilly and has its own tehsil. According to Census 2011 information the sub-district code of Bilsi block is 00780. Total area of Bilsi is 361 km^{2} including 332.13 km^{2} rural area and 28.60 km^{2} urban area. Bilsi has a population of 4,04,198 peoples. There are 67,758 houses in the sub-district. There are about 204 villages in Bilsi bloc

== Geography ==
Bilsi is located at 28.13°N 78.92°E. It has an average elevation of 180 metres (590 feet).

== Demographics ==
As of 2010 India census, Bilsi had a population of 26,320. Males constitute 53% of the population and females 47%. Bilsi has an average literacy rate of 45%, lower than the national average of 59.5%; with male literacy of 52% and female literacy of 37%. 18% of the population is under 6 years of age.

== Transport ==
Bilsi is strategically located and is well connected by road. It is situated on State Highway no 51 Badaun–Bijnor. It is well connected by roads to some of the famous cities like Agra, Mathura, Bareilly, Moradabad, Ghaziabad & Delhi.

== Major degree colleges ==
- Swarn Academy for Future Education, Sateti
- Maharana Pratap Government degree college

== Major hospitals ==
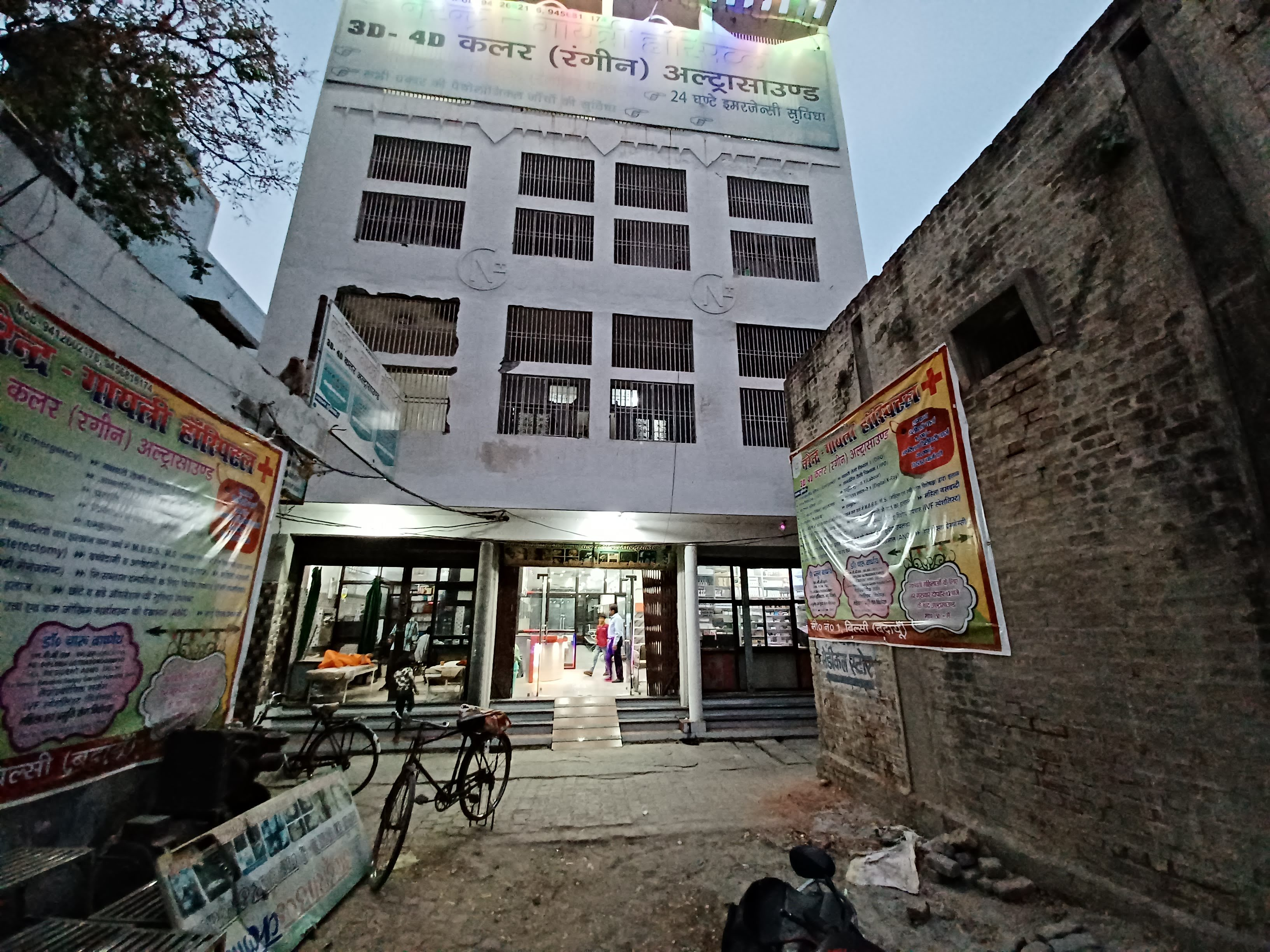
- Narendra-Gayatri Hospital
- Ranjana Hospital
- Government Hospital
- Gandhi Lineage Hospital
- Baba Mission Hospital
- Raj Nursing Home
- DeepJyoti Clinic
