= Mahesh Chandra Gupta =

Indian politician

Minister of state for Development Government of Uttar Pradesh
- In office 21 August 2019 – 25 March 2022
- Chief Minister: Yogi Adityanath
- Minister: Ashutosh Tandon
- Succeeded by: Rakesh Rathour

Member of Uttar Pradesh Legislative Assembly
- Incumbent
- Assumed office 2017
- Preceded by: Abid Raza Khan
- Constituency: Badaun
- In office 2007–2012
- Preceded by: Vimal Krishna Agarwal
- Succeeded by: Abid Raza Khan
- Constituency: Badaun

Personal details
- Born: 10 August 1957 (age 68)
- Party: Bharatiya Janata Party
- Spouse: Vimlesh Kumari (m. 1975)
- Parent: Raghuveer Sharan Gupta (father)
- Profession: Politician

Mahesh Chandra Gupta is an Indian politician and a member of 18th Uttar Pradesh Assembly and 17th Legislative Assembly, Uttar Pradesh of India. He represents the Badaun (Assembly constituency) in Budaun district of Uttar Pradesh.

== Political career ==
Mahesh Chandra Gupta contested Uttar Pradesh Assembly Election as Bharatiya Janata Party candidate and defeated Samajwadi Party candidate with a margin of 16,467 votes. He has been appointed Minister of state in a Yogi Adityanath cabinet on 21 August 2019.

In the 2022 Uttar Pradesh Assembly Election Mahesh Chandra Gupta won the Badaun seat by defeating Rais Ahmad of Samajwadi Party by a margin of 11179 votes.

== Posts held ==
#	From	To	Position	Comments
01	2007	2012	Member, 15th Legislative Assembly	
02	2017	2022	Member, 17th Legislative Assembly	
03	2019	2022	Minister of State, Government of Uttar Pradesh	
04	2022	Incumbent	Member, 18th Legislative Assembly	
