= Rashtriya Parivartan Dal =

Political party in India

Rashtriya Parivartan Dal (National Transformation Party) is a political party in India led by D. P. Yadav.

RPD have 2 seats in UP State Assembly. Party President is D. P. Yadav, Uttar Pradesh State President is Ram Samujh and State Vice President is Abhinav Shukla. Yadav's son, Vikas Yadav, had contested the 2002 Uttar Pradesh state assembly elections and lost. Vikas Yadav stands accused of murder. Ahead of the 2004 Lok Sabha elections Yadav joined the Bharatiya Janata Party. His stay in the party did however become short, due to the overwhelming criticism inside the BJP for accepting him in spite of his criminal record. After being expelled from the BJP, Yadav reconstituted RPD
