= Budaun district =

Coordinates: 28°07′N 78°59′E

- District of Uttar Pradesh
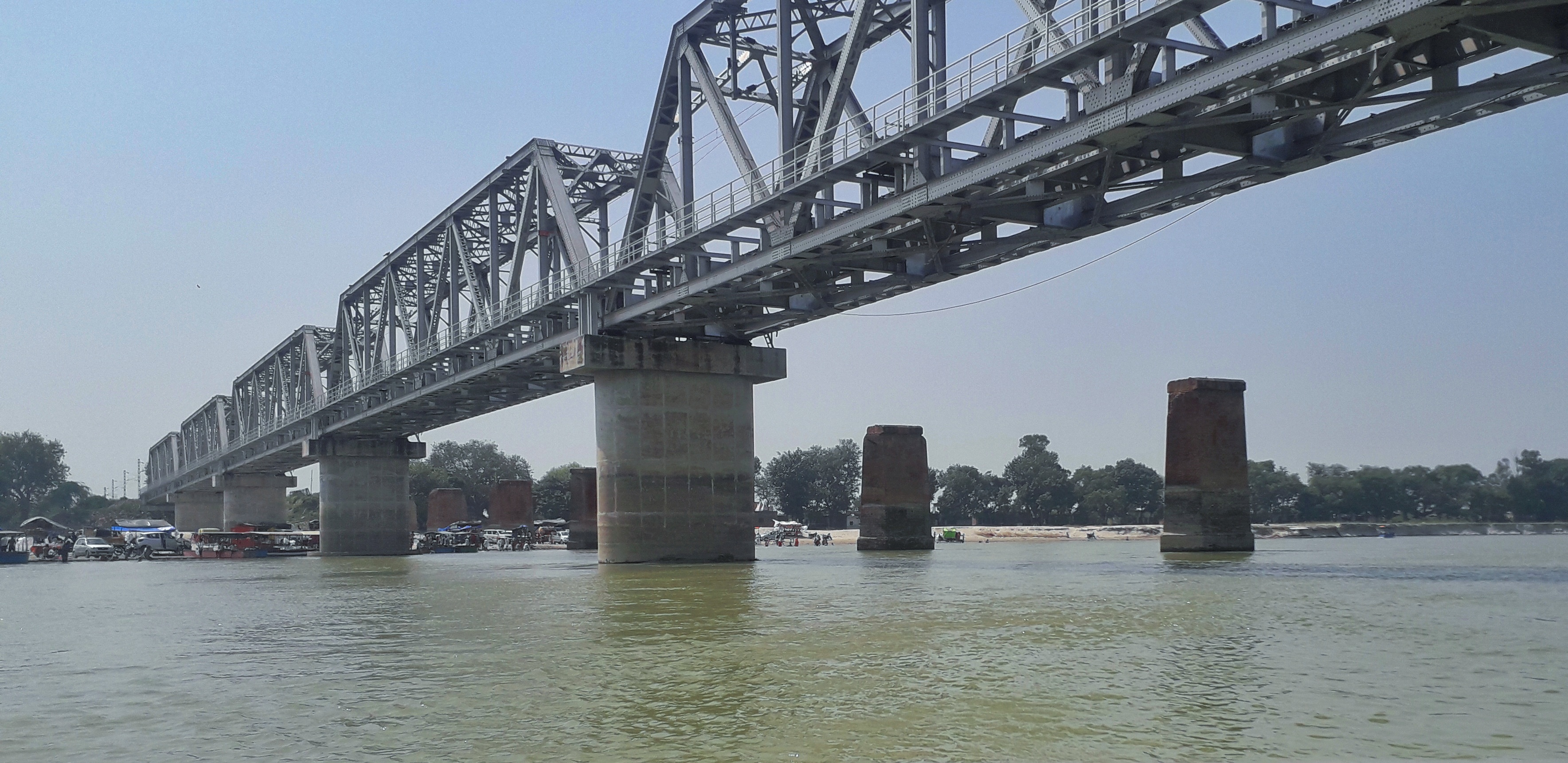
- Ganga river at Kachhla

- Location of Badaun district in Uttar Pradesh
- Country: India
- State: Uttar Pradesh
- Division: Bareilly
- Headquarters: Badaun
- Tehsils: 6

Government
  - Lok Sabha constituencies: Badaun, Aonla (partly)
  - Vidhan Sabha constituencies: 6

Area
  - Total: 4,234 km^{2} (1,635 sq mi)

Population (2011)
  - Total: 3,127,621
  - Density: 738.7/km^{2} (1,913/sq mi)
  - Urban: 826,000

Demographics
  - Literacy: 52.91 per cent
- Time zone: UTC+05:30 (IST)
- Major highways: SH33, SH43, SH51, SH18, NH 93
- Website: https://badaun.nic.in/

Budaun district (Hindi pronunciation: [bəd̪aːjũː]; or Buaaun) is one of the districts of Uttar Pradesh state of India, with its headquarters in the town of Budaun. The district is part of the Bareilly division, and covers an area of 4,234 km^{2} (1,635 sq mi). According to legend, Budaun was named after the Ahir prince Budh.

== History ==
Map of Badaun district before the creation of Sambhal district on 23 July 2012

After the British takeover in 1801, the area was part of Moradabad district, and parts were transferred to Bareilly district in 1805. In October 1823, the district was created out of areas previously in both Moradabad and Bareilly districts, and it was originally called Sahaswan district after its headquarters of Sahaswan. The headquarters was moved to Budaun in 1838. The Encyclopædia Britannica Eleventh Edition wrote of Budaun:

A town and district of British India, in the Rohilkhand division of the United Provinces. The town is near the left bank of the river Sot. [The population as of] 1901 [was] 39,031. There are ruins of an immense fort and a very handsome mosque of imposing size, crowned with a dome, and built in 1223 in great part from the materials of an ancient Hindu temple. The American Methodist mission maintains several girls' schools, and there is a high school for boys. According to tradition, Badaun was founded about A.D. 905, and an inscription, probably of the 12th century, gives a list of twelve Rathor kings reigning at Badaun (called Vodamayuta). The first authentic historical event connected with it, however, was its capture by Kutb-ud-din in 1196, after which it became a very important post on the northern frontier of the Delhi empire. In the 13th century two of its governors, Shams-ud-din Altamsh, the builder of the great mosque referred to above, and his son Rukd-ud-din Firoz, attained the imperial throne. In 1571 the town was burnt, and about a hundred years later, under Shah Jahan, the seat of the governorship was transferred to Bareilly; after which the importance of Badaun declined.

According to professor Goti John, the city was named Vedamooth (वेदामूथ) on an 11th-century stone inscription which is held at the Lucknow Museum. At that time, the region was called Panchal (पांचाल). According to a line of the inscription, there was a village named Bhadaulak (भदाऊँलक) near the city. Geographically, the city of Badaun is located near the Ganges, which the Hindus consider a holy river.

== Economy ==
In 2006, the Ministry of Panchayati Raj named Budaun one of the country's 251 special funded cities (out of a total of 640). It is one of the 34 districts in Uttar Pradesh currently receiving funds from the Backward Regions Grant Fund Programme (BRGF).

== Divisions ==
The district comprises five tehsils: Budaun, Bisauli, Bilsi, Dataganj and Sahaswan.

There are six Vidhan Sabha constituencies in the district: Bisauli, Sahaswan, Bilsi, Badaun, Shekhupur and Dataganj. While Shekhupur and Dataganj are part of the Aonla Lok Sabha constituency, the rest are part of the Badaun Lok Sabha constituency.

== Transport ==
Badaun is well connected with the rest of the state through roads and rail services, however the city lacks an airport. The nearest airport is the Bareilly Airport – a civil enclave at the Indian Air Force's 'Trishul Air Base' in Izzatnagar neighborhood of Bareilly, which is located at a distance of 60 kilometres (37 mi) from the city. The Indira Gandhi International Airport, located in Delhi is the nearest International Airport.

The National Highway 530B passes through the city and connects it with Bareilly and Mathura. A number of State Highways also pass through the city. Prominent among them are the UP State Highway 18, connecting Budaun with Meerut, UP State Highway 43, connecting Budaun with Moradabad & Farrukhabad and UP State Highway 51, which connects Budaun with Gajraula & Bijnor. Inter-city bus services to and from the city are operated from the Budaun bus station by the Uttar Pradesh State Road Transport Corporation and private operators. The Budaun bus station as well as the Budaun Depot come under the Bareilly region of UPSRTC.

=== Ganga Expressway ===
On 29 April 2026, Primeminister Narendra Modi inaugurated longest expressway of Uttar Pradesh, Ganga Expressway in Binawar, Budaun. The expressway is 594 KM long, which is connected 12 districts of the state (Meerut, Hapur, Bulandshahr, Amroha, Sambhal, Budaun, Shahjahanpur, Hardoi, Unnao, Raebareli, Pratapgarh, and Prayagraj).

== Demographics ==
Historical population
Year	Pop.	±% p.a.
1901	1,026,192	—
1911	1,054,293	+0.27%
1921	975,684	−0.77%
1931	1,010,467	+0.35%
1941	1,162,322	+1.41%
1951	1,251,152	+0.74%
1961	1,411,657	+1.21%
1971	1,645,967	+1.55%
1981	1,971,946	+1.82%
1991	2,448,338	+2.19%
2001	3,069,426	+2.29%
2011	3,681,896	+1.84%

According to the 2011 census Budaun district has a population of 3,681,896, roughly equal to the nation of Liberia or the US state of Oklahoma. This gives it a ranking of 71st in India out of 640. The district has a population density of 718 inhabitants per square kilometre (1,860/sq mi). Its population growth rate over the decade 2001–2011 was 20.96%. Budaun has a sex ratio of 859 females for every 1000 males and a literacy rate of 52.91%.

After the formation of Sambhal district and separation of Gunnaur tehsil, the district had a population of 3,127,621 and a sex ratio of 872 females per 1000 males. 593,254 (18.97%) lived in urban areas. Scheduled Castes make up 553,497 (17.70%) of the population.

The major urban areas in the district according to March 2015 estimates are Budaun (population 397,000), Ujhani (124,000), Sahaswan (118,000) and Kakrala (85,000).

=== Religion ===
Religions in residual Budaun district (2011)
Religion	Percent
Hinduism	76.05%
Islam	23.26%
Other or not stated	0.69%

The vast majority of the population residing in Budaun identifies with either Hinduism or Islam. Sikhs, Christians, and Jains also live in the region.

=== Language ===
Languages of residual Budaun district (2011)
1. Hindi (90.0%)
2. Urdu (9.93%)
3. Others (0.09%)

At the time of the 2011 Census of India, 89.98% of the population of the district spoke Hindi and 9.93% spoke Urdu as their first language.

== Major settlements ==
- Budaun
- Bisauli
- Sahaswan
- Ujhani
- Kakrala
- Bilsi
- Islamnagar
- Dataganj

=== Villages ===
- Badarpur, Budaun
- Faridpur Nausana
- Hansigunj
- Kartoli
- Ughaiti

== Notable people ==
- Mahesh Chandra Gupta – politician
- Inayat Hussain Khan – Indian classical vocalist
- Sanghmitra Maurya – politician
- Harish Shakya – politician
- Banwari Lal Verma – politician
- Dr. Akram Ahmad – Academician
- Shakeel Badayuni – Urdu poet
- Fani Badayuni Urdu Post
