= Old Hruaikawn =

Hruaikawn (old)
- village
- Location in Mizoram, India Hruaikawn (old) (India)
- Coordinates: 23.304876°N 93.356926°E
- Country: India
- State: Mizoram
- District: Champhai
- Block: Khawbung
- Elevation: 928 m (3,045 ft)

Population (2011)
  - Total: 395
- Time zone: UTC+5:30 (IST)
- 2011 census code: 271353

Hruaikawn (old) is a village in the Champhai district of Mizoram, India. It is located in the Khawbung R.D. Block, adjacent to New Hruaikawn.

== Demographics ==
According to the 2011 census of India, Old Hruaikawn has 77 households. The effective literacy rate (i.e. the literacy rate of population excluding children aged 6 and below) is 96.89%.

Demographics (2011 Census)
	Total	Male	Female
Population	395	206	189
Children aged below 6 years	73	40	33
Scheduled caste	0	0	0
Scheduled tribe	395	206	189
Literates	312	164	148
Workers (all)	113	104	9
Main workers (total)	111	102	9
Main workers: Cultivators	95	88	7
Main workers: Agricultural labourers	1	1	0
Main workers: Household industry workers	2	2	0
Main workers: Other	13	11	2
Marginal workers (total)	2	2	0
Marginal workers: Cultivators	0	0	0
Marginal workers: Agricultural labourers	0	0	0
Marginal workers: Household industry workers	0	0	0
Marginal workers: Others	2	2	0
Non-workers	282	102	180
