= Zo nationalism =

Independence movement in Myanmar and northeast India

Zo nationalism is an ethnic nationalist movement among the Zo people—a broad umbrella of interrelated tribes broadly comprising Zomi, Mizo, Chin, and Kuki, whose traditional homelands span Northeast India (Mizoram, Manipur and Tripura states), western Myanmar (Chin State) and Bangladesh (Chittagong Hill Tracts). These Zo tribes speak languages of the Kuki-Chin branch of the Tibeto-Burman language family and share a number of cultural traditions and folklore. These shared characteristics have contributed to efforts promoting a unified Zo identity and, among some groups, support for political autonomy or a proposed homeland often referred to as Zogam or Zoram ("Zo land").

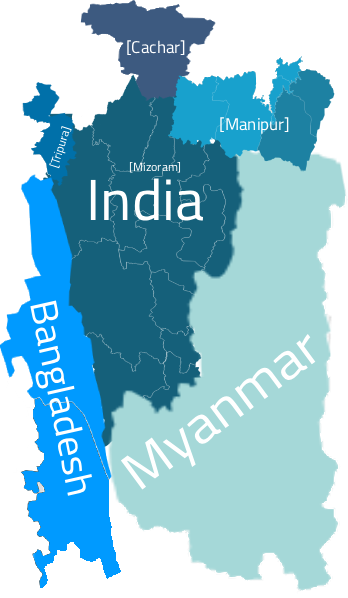
Regions inhabited by Zo people

Although divided by modern frontiers, the Zo people share many commonalities: for example, most Zo were traditional animists who were largely converted to Protestant Christianity by 19th-century missionaries. Many Zo communities today still emphasize a shared ancestry.

During the British colonial period, administrative approaches to the Chin and Lushai Hills varied over time. Colonial records refer to a late-19th-century Chin-Lushai conference (1892) that reportedly discussed joint administration of the hill regions; Zo leaders cite this meeting as a precedent. In practice, however, the British mostly kept the Chin Hills (in Burma) and Lushai Hills (in India) as separate provinces. One scholar describes colonial rule as being marked by the convenient segregation of these "rebellious tribes". After decolonization (India and Burma in 1947–48, Bangladesh in 1971), Zo communities found themselves scattered across three countries with no autonomous Zo-majority region. Zo nationalism has been support by the Zomi Re-Unification Organisation (ZRO) in India and Zomi National Congress (ZNC) in Myanmar, which interpret modern borders and state policies as colonial-era legacies that divided their traditional land.

== Background ==
The Zo people are a conglomerate of several warring tribes before and during the British rule in India and Myanmar. The British entered the Zo people's territory in 1888 and began colonial administration in 1890. In 1892, the British called the Chin-Lushai conference for the Chin and the Lushai, both hill tribes. The British favoured uniting the Chin and Lushai into one administration, but the Lushai rejected the plan. The Lushai hill tribe adopted the name Mizo, a poetic word for the Zomi. By then, they were variously identified, but sometimes contradictorily, by the major tribes Chin, Kuki, Mizo and Zomi.

The earliest known politically active Zo person was Than Pet Mang from Chin State. An officer in the Burma Rifles, then part of the British Army, he learned administrative system from the British officers. In 1942, he was impressed by a nationalistic speech of a Buddhist monk and resigned from the army. He returned to his native village, adopted a new name after the village and his father as Vum Thu Muang.

Although of the same Tibeto-Burman ethnicity, the Zo people are generally described as lacking social and political unity prior to the end of British rule in India in 1947 and in Myanmar (then Burma) in 1948. Bangladesh became an independent nation (from Pakistan, which in turn had split from India) in 1971. British administrative policy often kept the hill tribes separated, a strategy described as aimed at maintaining law and order.. Following independence, Zo tribes came under different administrative jurisdictions across separate countries. In 1944, the various groups, such as Sukte Independence Army were raised in Burma. In 1947, modern Burma was assembled from five countries, including Chin, Kachin, federated Shan State, Karen State and Burma according to the Panglong agreement. This agreement outlined each state's right to be self-administered after ten years from the date of agreement. However, the union of Burma was politically collapsing and the agreement fell apart.

In 1960, the Chin Liberation Army was founded by Tun Kho Pum Baite to reunify the Chin people while the Mizo National Front (MNF) strove for Mizo independence. MNF ended with the Mizoram state's creation by the Indian government. This movement did not cover all of Zogam. The Zomi Revolutionary Army was then created. TheZomi Revolutionary Army emerged as a principal armed group advocating Zomi reunification.

The 8888 uprising took place in 1988, when students across Myanmar protested against the military government. Zomi students were involved and later founded the Chin National Army (CNA). The CNA continued its armed campaign against the Burmese government for approximately six months, until it was defeated and many corpses were recovered from their camps. Some members went into hiding, while others formed smaller armed groups. The CNA was rejected by the Zomi National Congress. After a few months, the CNA asked for a ceasefire agreement with the Burmese government.

== Ethnic identity and cultural cohesion ==
The Zo tribes share many cultural bonds. Religiously, most Zo today are Protestant Christians. British missionaries converted large numbers of Chin/Kuki/Mizo tribes from animism by the mid-20th century. As one review notes, this formed "a close-knit Christian community" across Zo hills. Churches and mission schools became meeting-places for tribal members from different groups. In fact, Christian networks helped spread nationalist ideas: oral histories record that insurgent leaders and activists composed new "patriotic" and "nationalist" songs (called hnam hla, or "song of the land") during the Mizo uprising, and these were taught communally at church gatherings. Roluahpuia describes how such songs of hope and suffering ("rambuai lha") circulated by word of mouth, providing news and solidarity under wartime censorship. The Zo learned to "sing through their rambuai years". Music and oral traditions played an important role in maintaining a collective identity during the insurgency period.

Language is another important tie. Zo groups speak languages belonging to the Kuki-Chin branch of Tibeto-Burman family. These dozens of related dialects (Mizo, Falam Chin, Hakha Chin, Thadou, Paite, etc.) are often mutually intelligible. Zo leaders have periodically proposed greater linguistic unity; for example, in 2008 Zomi delegates to the United Nations urged creating one standardized "central Zomi dialect" out of the roughly 46 dialects then in use. In practice, most communities continue to use their own tongue (Mizoram now promotes the Mizo ṭawng as a state lingua franca). Politically, some Zo subgroups have rejected imposed labels (for instance, many Paite-led tribes in Manipur have rejected the colonial-era term "Kuki" as pejorative, preferring the term "Zo/Zomi" instead). The aspirational term “Zo” itself means "highlander" or "people of the north," and it is used by Mizo speakers as Zohnahthlak ("descendants of Zo"). In any case, most Zo activists emphasize culture, religion, and language over rigid bloodline, with many arguing that the various Zo groups belong to a common ethnic stock, even as individual communities maintain distinct village and clan identities.

Anthropologists note that some Chittagong-Hill tribes in Bangladesh (e.g. Bawm, Pangkhu, Khumi, Mro-Khimi) are "descendants of the Mizo–Chin–Kuki (Zo) groups". Consequently, these communities are often regarded as culturally and linguistically closer to the Zo of India and Myanmar than to neighboring peoples of the region.

== Historical development ==
=== Colonial era and partition ===
Zo history in the colonial period involves shifting British strategies in the Chin-Lushai hills. Initially the British consolidated scattered tribal lands into frontier districts (the Chin Hills and the Lushai Hills) and directly administered them under separate colonial governments. This separation was partly intentional: the British viewed these highland tribes as "rebellious," and it suited colonial control to treat the Chin (Burma) and Lushai (Assam/India) hills differently. British officers occasionally debated merging them, but in practice the two regions developed under distinct bureaucracies and missionary societies. Notably, in 1953 – just before Burma’s independence – the main Baptist church associations of the Chin Hills (Tedim, Falam, Hakha) voluntarily renamed themselves the Zomi Baptist Convention, formally adopting "Zomi" (‘Zo people’) as a collective national name. This was a cultural gesture toward unity, but no corresponding political unit was formed.

Following the end of British colonial rule, Zo-inhabited areas became divided among new states. In 1947 India gained independence and later Mizoram was carved out of Assam; in 1948 Burma (Myanmar) became independent with Chin State; and in 1971 Bangladesh emerged. As a result, Zo communities came to live under different administrative jurisdictions across India, Myanmar, and Bangladesh. One historian notes that different Zo tribes "had settled in and fell under different administrative jurisdictions in three countries" after decolonization. This partition of their population is a constant reference point for Zo nationalists. Modern commentators emphasize that the Zo were not given a single homeland by these events, leading to the feeling that arbitrary borders cut through one people.

=== Post-independence movements ===
In each country, Zo political movements arose to defend their interests—sometimes independently, sometimes in parallel. In India’s northeast, the Mizo people of the Lushai Hills were initially part of Assam. A key early party was the Mizo Union (founded in 1946), which cooperated with India’s Congress Party to end hereditary chieftainship in 1950. But as economic grievances mounted, a sepratist group emerged: the Mizo National Front (MNF). Formed on 22 October 1961 by Laldenga and others, the MNF demanded the creation of an independent homeland for all Mizos. The MNF’s 1961 manifesto explicitly declared its goal "to unify all the Mizos under a single administration". After diplomatic efforts failed, the Mizo National Front (MNF) launched an armed uprising on 28 February 1966, declaring an independent Mizoram government. In response, the Indian Government initiated a large-scale counterinsurgency operation, including limited air strikes in Aizawl in March 1966. The insurgency then continued as a prolonged conflict between MNF forces and the Indian state. Over the next two decades the MNF controlled parts of the hills and negotiated with New Delhi. By 1986, after protracted talks, the Mizoram Peace Accord was signed. This ended the rebellion, and Mizoram was granted full statehood (India’s 23rd state) on 20 February 1987. In short, the Mizo insurgency (1966–1986)—often called the Mizo War of Independence—lasted roughly twenty years before Mizoram’s achieved statehood.

Across the border in Burma, Chin political activism also grew after World War II. In 1960 the Chin Liberation Army was founded by Tun Kho Pum Baite with the goal of unifying all Chin tribes. Baite later aligned with the MNF in India actually worrying both the Burmese and the Indian government. In 1988, amid Burma’s nationwide 8888 pro-democracy uprising, Burmese Zo (Chin/Paites) students established the Chin National Army (CNA) to fight for Chin autonomy. Baite had also earlier proposed a United Zogam (Zo Country), separated from Myanmar and India. That short-lived CNA insurgency though lasted about six months before government forces crushed it. Some of its members later formed smaller guerrilla groups or joined the Chin National Front (CNF), which had been founded that same year (1988) and was already fighting for greater Chin rights. The CNF remained active after the 1990s and later entered ceasefire agreements with the Myanmar government.

In India’s Manipur state, various Zo (Kuki-Chin) tribes also formed parties. Notably, T. Gougin founded a "United Zomi Organisation" in 1961 and the Zomi National Congress (ZNC) in 1972, aiming to advance Zomi interests in Manipur. Decades later, ethnic tensions in Churachandpur district (where many Thadou-Kuki and Paite live) led to new militancy. A group calling itself the Zomi Re-unification Organisation (sometimes called ZRO) was formed in April 1993 in Myanmar’s Kachin State (Phapian), with the aim of uniting Kuki-Zo peoples across borders. A separate armed wing, the Zomi Revolutionary Army (ZRA), was established in Manipur in 1997 to pursue this agenda. The ZRA explicitly identifies as a Zomi nationalist militant group. It remains active in parts of Manipur, allied at times with other insurgents (e.g. NSCN-IM).

Meanwhile in Bangladesh’s Chittagong Hill Tracts (CHT), the smaller Kuki-Chin tribes (including the Bawm, Khumi, Pangkhua, etc.) had largely been overshadowed by larger Chakma and Marma ethnic movements. Some Bawm activists in the 2010s drew upon Zo nationalist ideas. The most prominent is the Kuki-Chin National Front (KNF), founded by Nathan Bom (Bawm) around 2017. The KNF declared the goal of carving out a separate "Kuki-Chin State" from parts of Rangamati and Bandarban districts. It also established an armed wing (Kuki-Chin National Army). The group’s ideology explicitly cited Zo/Kuki identity, but it has been banned by the Bangladeshi government as a militant organization. Zo nationalism in Bangladesh has remained a fringe phenomenon.

== Political organizations and parties ==
Over time, the Zo nationalist idea has been carried out by various parties and NGOs:

- Mizo National Front (MNF) – The MNF began as an armed independence movement in the 1960s. After the 1986 peace accord, the MNF became a mainstream regional party in Mizoram. Today it governs or leads Mizoram at times. The MNF often embraces Zo rhetoric: its leaders have publicly affirmed that the party "fights for Zo nationalism, unity and freedom of the Zo" wherever they live (for example, MNF officials joined tribal unity events in neighboring Manipur).
- Zo Reunification Organization (ZORO) – Founded on 20 May 1988 in Aizawl, Mizoram, ZORO is a nonprofit advocacy group dedicated to uniting Zo peoples. It grew out of an international "World Zo Convention" held in Champhai (Mizoram) on 18–19 May 1988, which was convened by Zomi leaders from India and Myanmar. At that convention delegates adopted “Zo” as the collective ethnonym for the tribes tracing their origin to an ancestral land (Chhinlung), and set up ZORO with Mizoram politician Brigadier T. Sailo as its first chairman. ZORO’s mission is to preserve Zo culture and push for political unity across borders. It has engaged internationally – participating in UN indigenous rights forums (the Working Group on Indigenous Populations since 1999 and the Permanent Forum on Indigenous Issues since 2004) – and it lobbies governments about Zo concerns.
- Zomi National Congress (ZNC) – A small party founded in Manipur in 1972 the ZNC was part of the early Zomi movement in India. It helped convene the 1988 Champhai convention and has allied with ZORO’s efforts. (In Mizoram’s politics, an ally was the People’s Conference party of Brig. Sailo, which had earlier cooperated with Zomi activists.) Today the ZNC remains active in Manipur and Myanmar (as the Zomi Congress for Democracy) as a regional party under names like Zomi Party or Chin Union.
- Zomi Revolutionary Army (ZRA) – As noted, the ZRA is a militant insurgent group formed in 1997 from the Zomi Re-unification Organization’s Manipur wing. It openly advocates Zomi nationalism as its ideology. At times the ZRA has clashed with Indian security forces, and it maintains bases in Manipur and refugee camps in Myanmar. (Although it took up arms in India, it also sees itself aligned with Chin groups in Myanmar.)
- Chin National Army and Chin National Front – In Myanmar, the major Chin resistance force has been the Chin National Front (CNF), with its armed wing the Chin National Army (CNA). The CNF, formed in 1988, fought low-intensity guerrilla war before settling for ceasefires in the 1990s Some Chin nationalist parties operate legally in Myanmar’s exile community (e.g. Chin National Party).
- Kuki-Chin National Front – In Bangladesh, the outlawed KNF (2017–present) is the only overtly Zo-identified group with an armed wing; most CHT indigenous politics are dominated by the Parbatya Chattagram Jana Samhati Samiti (PCJSS), which historically represents the Chakma and other tribes.
- Zoram People's Movement (ZPM) – It is a regional political party in Mizoram, India, that aligns closely with the ethos of Zo nationalism—the movement advocating unity, identity, and self-determination for the Zo people, who are spread across Mizoram, Manipur, Chin State (Myanmar), and parts of Bangladesh. Founded in 2017 and led by Lalduhoma, ZPM champions clean governance, youth empowerment, and protection of Zo cultural and political identity. Though primarily active in Mizoram, ZPM reflects broader pan-Zo nationalist sentiments by promoting policies that prioritize Zo heritage, economic self-reliance (such as through agricultural MSPs), and secular, inclusive governance.

== Key events and conflict ==
Significant events in the Zo nationalist saga include:

- 1966–1986: Mizo insurgency and statehood. The MNF rebellion began on 28 February 1966 and continued for about twenty years. As one analyst notes, the “Mizo War of Independence” spanned "nearly 20 years". During this conflict the declared independence and launched an armed uprising. Indian forces conducted major operations (including the 1966 bombing of Aizawl and Village Regrouping Scheme). Ultimately, negotiations led to the 1986 Mizoram Peace Accord, and by 1987 Mizoram became the 23rd state of India. This settlement ended the MNF’s armed struggle – though MNF leaders (like Laldenga) later joined the Indian political system.
- 1988: World Zo Convention and Chin uprising in Myanmar. In May 1988, Zo leaders from Mizoram and Manipur convened in Champhai, Mizoram, for the first World Zo Convention. They formally adopted "Zo" as the common ethnonym and resolved to continue pursuing reunification. This convention directly led to the founding of the Zo Reunification Organization (ZORO) in Mizoram on 20 May 1988. Later that year, the nationwide 8-8-88 pro-democracy uprising in Burma briefly revitalized Chin/Zo nationalism. Zomi student activists in Burma formed the Chin National Army (CNA) to fight the junta. Although the CNA was defeated within months, it marked a moment of united Zo resistance on the Burmese side.
- 1997: Formation of the Zomi Revolutionary Army. In India’s Manipur, growing ethnic strife led to the rise of the ZRA (and its parent ZRO). In April 1993 a Zomi Re-unification Organisation (ZRO) was founded in Myanmar by Chin and Paite leaders. Four years later, in 1997, the ZRA was established in Manipur as its armed wing. The ZRA’s goal was explicitly to safeguard Zomi unity in the Manipur hills. Though a minor player compared to larger insurgencies, the ZRA underscored that Zo nationalism had become militarized in both India and Myanmar.
- 2000s–2020s: International advocacy and renewed conflicts. Beginning around 2000, Zo activists took their case to international platforms. For example, ZORO representatives delivered statements at UN forums (the UN Working Group on Indigenous Populations and the Permanent Forum on Indigenous Issues) highlighting Zo concerns. In 2008, a ZORO speaker at the UNPFII described the Zomi people as "scattered, depressed and suffering" under cross-border restrictions He noted many Zo had fled Myanmar for the United States and proposed creating unified Zo institutions (like a university and a single Zo dialect) Meanwhile, regional upheavals have affected Zo unity. Since the 2021 military coup in Myanmar, Chin insurgents have made significant gains in northern Chin State. In late 2023, various Chin/Zomi armed groups and community leaders convened a "Chinland Conference" to draft a new regional constitution and set up a Chinland Council (a provisional government) in exile. This suggests a renewed push for an autonomous Chin (Zo) state parallel to Myanmar’s national politics. In India’s Northeast, the 2023 ethnic clashes in Manipur (between Kuki and Meitei communities) have also stirred Zo sentiments. Mizoram’s politicians, both in the ruling Mizo National Front and the opposition Zoram People’s Movement (ZPM), have openly opposed pushing back any Kuki-Zo refugees to Manipur. Indeed, Mizoram has taken in over 35,000 Chin refugees from Myanmar and around 12,000 Kuki-Zo displaced from Manipur since 2021 Both former CM Zoramthanga (MNF) and current CM Lalduhoma (ZPM) have vowed to continue sheltering these Zo kin. By contrast, the government of Bangladesh has reacted strongly to any hint of Zo separatism: the KNF was banned and security forces have cracked down on its cells, fearing any threat from CHT unity.

These events show that Zo nationalism today remains mostly an ideal and cultural phenomenon rather than a mass separatist uprising. The creation of Mizoram as an Indian state (1987) was the movement’s single greatest political achievement, and most other efforts have had limited success. Nevertheless, the idea of Zo unity continues to influence political discourse in Mizoram, advocacy networks, and cultural memory among Zo communities. As one leader put it in 2023, the long-term "vision" of Zo nationalism is to see "all the Zo people… under one administrative unit" – even if for now this remains a distant aspiration.

== Culture, religion, and language ==
Zo culture and religion provide crucial cohesion for the movement. Since most Zo communities adopted Christianity in the past two centuries, church life unites tribes. Worship services, Sunday schools, and youth fellowships function as social networks that cut across clan boundaries and provide spaces where pan-Zo ideas and messages can spread. For example, the old Mizo hymn "Zalehlawm" (meaning "song of justice/land") and later Zo reinterpretations of national anthems have been used by activists. As noted, singing in church was a key way Mizo insurgents sustained morale. Christian schools taught literacy, helping students from Mizoram and Chin State to share ideas. Many Zomi student groups formed cross-border ties through church-organized conferences. In turn, Zo identity has also affected religion: some Zo theologians emphasize a special providence for the Zo people, and there are even syncretic claims of ancient Israelite descent among a few groups (though this is a minority view).

Language and oral traditions also play an important role. Because the Zo people lacked an early unified script or press, nationalist ideas were often spread by mouth and ear. Beyond songs, folklore and oral histories have been retold to emphasize a common past. After India’s independence, tribal leaders composed new jal (traditional chants) in honor of fallen heroes and martyrs, and Zomi history was preserved in village elders’ stories. Some elders of Mizoram’s Young Lushai Association in the 1950s spoke of a legendary migration from a place called "Chhinlung" or "Shinlung"; this myth has been used by modern Zomi nationalists as the cradle of all Zo tribes. While some members of Zo communites regard the tradition as a constructed myth, others argue it is a source of shared identity and pride. Today there is no single "Zo language"—the Mizo language functions as a regional lingua franca, and many students of Kuki-Chin origin learn it in school.

== Diaspora and international advocacy ==
Outside the Zo homelands, diaspora communities and international forums have carried the Zo message. In the United States, United Kingdom, and elsewhere, thousands of Chin/Zomi have resettled as refugees or migrants. Zomi associations are active in Aizawl (Mizoram), Pune and Bangalore (India), and New York and California (USA), often tied to churches. These diaspora networks exchange information and campaign for Zo rights.

The United Nations has been a notable venue: as mentioned, ZORO delegates have briefed UN bodies multiple times. In 2008, ZORO’s spokesman Chhunthang Sangchia told the UN Permanent Forum that Zo people were "scattered" and needed institutional support (a university, a standardized language). ZORO also reports to the UN Working Group on Indigenous Populations. Similarly, Chin community organizations in countries like India and Thailand lobby for international awareness of Chin/Zomi issues. While no major foreign government publicly backs Zo nationalism, advocacy work has kept Zo grievances on the global map of indigenous rights.

== See also ==
- Tunkhopum Baite
- Crown Colony of Eastern Agency Scheme

== Sources ==
- Thoudam, Natasa (2016). "Collective Memory' as an Alternative to Dominant (Hi)stories in Narratives by Women from and in Manipur" (PDF). Post Colonial Interventions. 2 (1). ISSN 2455-6564. Archived (PDF) from the original on 15 June 2024.
- Chakraborty, Anup Shekhar (2013). "Identity and Virtual Spaces among the Zo hnahthlak: Emergent Zo cyberpolitics". In Desai, Gaurav (ed.). The Virtual Transformation of the Public Sphere: Knowledge, Politics, Identity. London: Routeledge India.
- Chawngsailova (2021). "A Brief Account of the evolution of Mizo Nationalism". Historical Journal Mizoram. XXI (1). Archived from the original on 8 October 2025.
- Khup, Za Go (2008). Zo Chronicles: A documentary study of history and culture of the Kuki-Chin-Lushai Tribe. Delhi: Mittal Publications. Archived from the original on 8 October 2025.
- Piang, L. Lam Kan (2008). "Clan, Dialect and Tribe Identity: Emergence of Crosscutting Identity among the Zo people in Manipur". Indian Anthropologist. 28 (1). ISSN 0970-0927. JSTOR 41920056. Archived from the original on 28 October 2025.
- Piang, L. Lam Khan (2012). "Ethnic mobilisation for decolonisation: colonial legacy (the case of the Zo people in Northeast India)". Asian Ethnicity. 14 (3). Taylor Francis. doi:10.1080/14631369.2012.688670.
- Pau, Pum Khan (7 August 2020). "Transborder People, Connected History: Border and Relationships in the Indo-Burma Borderlands". Journal of Borderlands Studies. 35 (4). doi:10.1080/08865655.2018.1438914. ISSN 0886-5655.
- Roluahpuia (2019). "Whose border is it anyway? Control, contestation, and confluence in Indo-Myanmar borderlands". Contemporary South Asia. 28 (1): 74–85. doi:10.1080/09584935.2019.1701631.
- Zou, David Vumlallian (9 August 2022). "Peopling the Yunnan-Bengal corridor". Routledge Handbook of Highland Asia. Taylor & Francis. doi:10.4324/9780429345746-24. ISBN 978-0-429-34574-6. Archived from the original on 5 May 2025.
- Sangkima (2004). Essays on the History of the Mizos. Delhi: Spectrum Publications. p. 27.
- Shahruddin, Amirah Syuhada; Fauziah Fathil (1 January 2024). "The Power Struggle Between the Military Junta and Democracy in Myanmar". IIUM Journal of Religion and Civilisational Studies. 6 (2): 213–232. doi:10.31436/ijrcs.v6i2.309. ISSN 2637-112X. Archived from the original on 1 December 2024.
- Shih, Chih-yu (2016). Borderland Politics in Northern India. United Kingdom: Taylor & Francis. Archived from the original on 8 October 2025.
- Zou, David Vumlallian (2010). "A Historical Study of the 'Zo' Struggle". Economic and Political Weekly. 45 (14): 56–63. Archived from the original on 3 September 2025.
- Vumson (1990). Zo History: With an Introduction to Zo Culture, Economy, Religion and Their Status as an Ethnic Minority in India, Burma, and Bangladesh. Aizawl, India: N.T. Thawnga.
- Das, N. K. (2021). "Indigeneity, Cultural Memory, and Hybrid Identity: Politics of 'Belonging' Among Zomi–Chin-Kuki People of India–Myanmar Borderlands". In Giri, Ananta Kumar (ed.). Cross-Fertilizing Roots and Routes: Identities, Social Creativity, Cultural Regeneration and Planetary Realizations. Singapore: Springer. doi:10.1007/978-981-15-7118-3_13. ISBN 978-981-15-7118-3. Archived from the original on 30 January 2024.
- Doungel, Jangkhongam (June 2014). "Genesis and Functioning of the Zo Re-Unification Organisation (Z.O.R.O.)". SKWC Journal of Social Sciences, 2014. SSRN 4120561. Archived from the original on 23 May 2025.
- Swift, Peter (2017). "The Burma Democratic Front: How Eighty-Eight Generation Chin were Mobilized into the Chin National Front". Journal of Burma Studies. 21 (1): 133–169. doi:10.1353/jbs.2017.0003. ISSN 2010-314X.
- Aung, Geoffrey Rathgeb; Campbell, Stephen (15 February 2024). "The Myanmar radical tradition: revolution, reaction, and the changing imperial world order". Dialectical Anthropology. 48 (2): 193–219. doi:10.1007/s10624-024-09716-0. ISSN 1573-0786. Archived from the original on 4 May 2025.
- Pau, Pum Khan; Mung, Thang Sian (2021). "Fragmented tribes of the India-Burma-Bangladesh borderlands: representation of the Zo (Kuki-Chin) people in colonial ethnography". Asian Ethnicity. doi:10.1080/14631369.2021.1885291.
- Chima, Jugdep; Saikia, Pahi (2023). Insurgency in India's Northeast. Taylor & Francis. ISBN 9781000952001.
- Ludden, David (2011). "The Politics of Independence in Bangladesh". Economic and Political Weekly. 46 (35). ISSN 0012-9976. JSTOR 23017911. Archived from the original on 20 August 2022.
- Pau, Pum Khan (1 January 2007). "Administrative Rivalries on a Frontier: Problem of the Chin-Lushai Hills". Indian Historical Review. 34 (1). doi:10.1177/037698360703400108. ISSN 0376-9836. Archived from the original on 22 September 2018.
- Zarzosanga (24 March 2021). "Two Strands of Nationalism: A Narrative on the Mizo War of Independence". Studies in Indian Politics. 9 (1). doi:10.1177/2321023021999157. ISSN 2321-0230.
- Walton, Matthew J. (1 December 2008). "Ethnicity, Conflict, and History in Burma: The Myths of Panglong". Asian Survey. 48 (6). doi:10.1525/as.2008.48.6.889. ISSN 0004-4687. Archived from the original on 5 December 2024.
- Ghosh, Arun; Chakrabarti, Radharaman (1991). Ethnonationalism. Chatterjee Publishers. ISBN 9788185089065.
- Guyot-Réchard, Bérénice (2021). "Tangled Lands: Burma and India's Unfinished Separation, 1937–1948". The Journal of Asian Studies. 80 (2). doi:10.1017/S0021911820000017. ISSN 0021-9118. Archived from the original on 26 December 2024.
- Thangsuanhau, P.; Jamkhanpau, V. (2013). "Zomi Diaspora, Culture And Politics". Journal of Tribal Intellectual Collective India. 1 (2). ISSN 2321-5437. Archived from the original on 10 August 2025.
- Khan Suan, H. Kham (September 2011). "Rethinking 'tribe' identities: The politics of recognition among the Zo in north-east India". Contributions to Indian Sociology. 45 (2). doi:10.1177/006996671104500201. ISSN 0069-9659. Archived from the original on 22 May 2025.
