= Sesih =

- village
- Location in Mizoram, India Sesih (India)
- Coordinates: 23.2926878°N 93.3370028°E
- Country: India
- State: Mizoram
- District: Champhai
- Block: Khawbung
- Elevation: 1,289 m (4,229 ft)

Population (2011)
  - Total: 1,227
- Time zone: UTC+5:30 (IST)
- 2011 census code: 271355

Sesih is a Mizo village in the Champhai district of Mizoram, India. It is located in the Khawbung R.D. Block.

== Demographics ==
According to the 2011 census of India, Sesih has 239 households. The effective literacy rate (i.e. the literacy rate of population excluding children aged 6 and below) is 95.07%.

Demographics (2011 Census)
	Total	Male	Female
Population	1227	596	631
Children aged below 6 years	233	110	123
Scheduled caste	0	0	0
Scheduled tribe	1225	595	630
Literates	945	471	474
Workers (all)	621	304	317
Main workers (total)	520	275	245
Main workers: Cultivators	459	222	237
Main workers: Agricultural labourers	0	0	0
Main workers: Household industry workers	5	5	0
Main workers: Other	56	48	8
Marginal workers (total)	101	29	72
Marginal workers: Cultivators	72	4	68
Marginal workers: Agricultural labourers	7	5	2
Marginal workers: Household industry workers	4	3	1
Marginal workers: Others	18	17	1
Non-workers	606	292	314
