= Bungzung =

- village
- Location in Mizoram, India Bungzung (India)
- Coordinates: 23.2821862°N 93.234481°E
- Country: India
- State: Mizoram
- District: Champhai
- Block: Khawbung
- Elevation: 1,265 m (4,150 ft)

Population (2011)
  - Total: 1,038
- Time zone: UTC+5:30 (IST)
- 2011 census code: 271357

Bungzung is a village in the Champhai district of Mizoram, India. It is located in the Khawbung R.D. Block.

== Demographics ==
According to the 2011 census of India, Bungzung has 225 households. The effective literacy rate (i.e. the literacy rate of population excluding children aged 6 and below) is 97.4%.

Demographics (2011 Census)
	Total	Male	Female
Population	1038	523	515
Children aged below 6 years	154	76	78
Scheduled caste	0	0	0
Scheduled tribe	1036	523	513
Literates	861	442	419
Workers (all)	440	274	166
Main workers (total)	438	273	165
Main workers: Cultivators	310	188	122
Main workers: Agricultural labourers	22	16	6
Main workers: Household industry workers	3	2	1
Main workers: Other	103	67	36
Marginal workers (total)	2	1	1
Marginal workers: Cultivators	0	0	0
Marginal workers: Agricultural labourers	1	0	1
Marginal workers: Household industry workers	1	1	0
Marginal workers: Others	0	0	0
Non-workers	598	249	349
