= Ngur =

- village
- Location in Mizoram, India Ngur (India)
- Coordinates: 23.5386765°N 93.3735346°E
- Country: India
- State: Mizoram
- District: Champhai
- Block: Champhai
- Elevation: 1,566 m (5,138 ft)

Population (2011)
  - Total: 1,674
- Time zone: UTC+5:30 (IST)
- 2011 census code: 271347

Ngur is a Mizo village in the Champhai district of Mizoram, India. It is located in the Champhai R.D. Block.

== Demographics ==
According to the 2011 census of India, Ngur has 335 households. The effective literacy rate (i.e. the literacy rate of population excluding children aged 6 and below) is 97.29%.

Demographics (2011 Census)
	Total	Male	Female
Population	1674	826	848
Children aged below 6 years	382	205	177
Scheduled caste	0	0	0
Scheduled tribe	1656	816	840
Literates	1257	607	650
Workers (all)	983	471	512
Main workers (total)	707	425	282
Main workers: Cultivators	629	380	249
Main workers: Agricultural labourers	21	6	15
Main workers: Household industry workers	1	1	0
Main workers: Other	56	38	18
Marginal workers (total)	276	46	230
Marginal workers: Cultivators	56	14	42
Marginal workers: Agricultural labourers	214	27	187
Marginal workers: Household industry workers	2	1	1
Marginal workers: Others	4	4	0
Non-workers	691	355	336
