= Thekte =

- village
- Location in Mizoram, India Thekte (India)
- Coordinates: 23.0459312°N 93.2602485°E
- Country: India
- State: Mizoram
- District: Champhai
- Block: Khawbung
- Elevation: 1,462 m (4,797 ft)

Population (2011)
  - Total: 489
- Time zone: UTC+5:30 (IST)
- 2011 census code: 271372

Thekte is a village in the Champhai district of Mizoram, India. It is located in the Khawbung R.D. Block.

== Demographics ==
According to the 2011 census of India, Thekte has 103 households. The effective literacy rate (i.e. the literacy rate of population excluding children aged 6 and below) is 90.27%.

Demographics (2011 Census)
| | Total | Male | Female |
|---|---|---|---|
| Population | 489 | 246 | 243 |
| Children aged below 6 years | 88 | 44 | 44 |
| Scheduled caste | 0 | 0 | 0 |
| Scheduled tribe | 479 | 243 | 236 |
| Literates | 362 | 185 | 177 |
| Workers (all) | 175 | 121 | 54 |
| Main workers (total) | 161 | 119 | 42 |
| Main workers: Cultivators | 152 | 113 | 39 |
| Main workers: Agricultural labourers | 0 | 0 | 0 |
| Main workers: Household industry workers | 0 | 0 | 0 |
| Main workers: Other | 9 | 6 | 3 |
| Marginal workers (total) | 14 | 2 | 12 |
| Marginal workers: Cultivators | 14 | 2 | 12 |
| Marginal workers: Agricultural labourers | 0 | 0 | 0 |
| Marginal workers: Household industry workers | 0 | 0 | 0 |
| Marginal workers: Others | 0 | 0 | 0 |
| Non-workers | 314 | 125 | 189 |
