= Melhnih =

Melhnih Melhnih (Chalrang)
- village
- Location in Mizoram, India Melhnih (India)
- Coordinates: 23.411852°N 93.101654°E
- Country: India
- State: Mizoram
- District: Champhai
- Block: Khawzawl
- Elevation: 854 m (2,802 ft)

Population (2011)
  - Total: 28
- Time zone: UTC+5:30 (IST)
- 2011 census code: 271333

Melhnih (Chalrang) is a village in the Champhai district of Mizoram, India. It is located in the Khawzawl R.D. Block.

== Demographics ==
According to the 2011 census of India, Melhnih (Chalrang) has 13 households. The effective literacy rate (i.e. the literacy rate of population excluding children aged 6 and below) is 56%.

Demographics (2011 Census)
	Total	Male	Female
Population	28	19	9
Children aged below 6 years	3	3	0
Scheduled caste	0	0	0
Scheduled tribe	24	17	7
Literates	14	9	5
Workers (all)	25	16	9
Main workers (total)	25	16	9
Main workers: Cultivators	14	10	4
Main workers: Agricultural labourers	0	0	0
Main workers: Household industry workers	0	0	0
Main workers: Other	11	6	5
Marginal workers (total)	0	0	0
Marginal workers: Cultivators	0	0	0
Marginal workers: Agricultural labourers	0	0	0
Marginal workers: Household industry workers	0	0	0
Marginal workers: Others	0	0	0
Non-workers	3	3	0
