= North East Diltlang =

North East Diltlang N.E. Diltlang
- village
- Location in Mizoram, India North East Diltlang (India)
- Coordinates: 23.601601°N 93.4015816°E
- Country: India
- State: Mizoram
- District: Champhai
- Block: Champhai
- Elevation: 1,480 m (4,860 ft)

Population (2011)
  - Total: 379
- Time zone: UTC+5:30 (IST)
- 2011 census code: 271345

North East Diltlang is a village in the Champhai district of Mizoram, India. It is located in the Champhai R.D. Block.

== Demographics ==
According to the 2011 census of India, North East Diltlang has 68 households. The effective literacy rate (i.e. the literacy rate of population excluding children aged 6 and below) is 97.96%.

Demographics (2011 Census)
	Total	Male	Female
Population	379	196	183
Children aged below 6 years	85	45	40
Scheduled caste	0	0	0
Scheduled tribe	377	195	182
Literates	288	149	139
Workers (all)	191	100	91
Main workers (total)	190	100	90
Main workers: Cultivators	180	91	89
Main workers: Agricultural labourers	0	0	0
Main workers: Household industry workers	1	1	0
Main workers: Other	9	8	1
Marginal workers (total)	1	0	1
Marginal workers: Cultivators	1	0	1
Marginal workers: Agricultural labourers	0	0	0
Marginal workers: Household industry workers	0	0	0
Marginal workers: Others	0	0	0
Non-workers	188	96	92
