= Thekpui =

- village
- Location in Mizoram, India Thekpui (India)
- Coordinates: 23.0619738°N 93.2395077°E
- Country: India
- State: Mizoram
- District: Champhai
- Block: Khawbung
- Elevation: 1,319 m (4,327 ft)

Population (2011)
  - Total: 320
- Time zone: UTC+5:30 (IST)
- 2011 census code: 271374

Thekpui is a village in the Champhai district of Mizoram, India. It is in the Khawbung R.D. Block.

== Demographics ==
At the time of the 2011 census of India, Thekpui had 62 households. The effective literacy rate (i.e. the literacy rate of population excluding children aged 6 and below) was 95.77%.

Demographics (2011 Census)
	Total	Male	Female
Population	320	170	150
Children aged below 6 years	60	32	28
Scheduled caste	0	0	0
Scheduled tribe	315	166	149
Literates	249	137	112
Workers (all)	177	93	84
Main workers (total)	176	92	84
Main workers: Cultivators	175	92	83
Main workers: Agricultural labourers	0	0	0
Main workers: Household industry workers	0	0	0
Main workers: Other	1	0	1
Marginal workers (total)	1	1	0
Marginal workers: Cultivators	1	1	0
Marginal workers: Agricultural labourers	0	0	0
Marginal workers: Household industry workers	0	0	0
Marginal workers: Others	0	0	0
Non-workers	143	77	66
