= Khuangthing =

- village
- Location in Mizoram, India Khuangthing (India)
- Coordinates: 23.0962691°N 93.1986805°E
- Country: India
- State: Mizoram
- District: Champhai
- Block: Khawbung
- Elevation: 1,194 m (3,917 ft)

Population (2011)
  - Total: 1,435
- Time zone: UTC+5:30 (IST)
- 2011 census code: 271375

Khuangthing is a village in the Champhai district of Mizoram, India. It is located in the Khawbung R.D. Block.

== Demographics ==
According to the 2011 census of India, Khuangthing has 293 households. The effective literacy rate (i.e. the literacy rate of population excluding children aged 6 and below) is 98.42%.

Demographics (2011 Census)
	Total	Male	Female
Population	1435	723	712
Children aged below 6 years	235	117	118
Scheduled caste	0	0	0
Scheduled tribe	1430	722	708
Literates	1181	596	585
Workers (all)	762	398	364
Main workers (total)	762	398	364
Main workers: Cultivators	735	377	358
Main workers: Agricultural labourers	4	3	1
Main workers: Household industry workers	1	1	0
Main workers: Other	22	17	5
Marginal workers (total)	0	0	0
Marginal workers: Cultivators	0	0	0
Marginal workers: Agricultural labourers	0	0	0
Marginal workers: Household industry workers	0	0	0
Marginal workers: Others	0	0	0
Non-workers	673	325	348
