= Dilkawn =

- village
- Location in Mizoram, India Dilkawn (India)
- Coordinates: 23.343674°N 93.122383°E
- Country: India
- State: Mizoram
- District: Champhai
- Block: Khawzawl
- Elevation: 1,072 m (3,517 ft)

Population (2011)
  - Total: 842
- Time zone: UTC+5:30 (IST)
- 2011 census code: 271337

Dilkawn is a village in the Champhai district of Mizoram, India. Its R.D. Block is Khawzawl.

== Demographics ==
According to the 2011 census of India, Dilkawn has 191 households. The effective literacy rate (i.e. the literacy rate of population excluding children aged 6 and below) is 98.03%.

Demographics (2011 Census)
	Total	Male	Female
Population	842	408	434
Children aged below 6 years	131	65	66
Scheduled caste	0	0	0
Scheduled tribe	830	405	425
Literates	697	340	357
Workers (all)	466	245	221
Main workers (total)	282	222	60
Main workers: Cultivators	264	210	54
Main workers: Agricultural labourers	0	0	0
Main workers: Household industry workers	10	6	4
Main workers: Other	8	6	2
Marginal workers (total)	184	23	161
Marginal workers: Cultivators	10	2	8
Marginal workers: Agricultural labourers	2	0	2
Marginal workers: Household industry workers	137	4	133
Marginal workers: Others	35	17	18
Non-workers	376	163	213
