= New Dungtlang =

- village
- Location in Mizoram, India New Dungtlang (India)
- Coordinates: 23.212133°N 93.272637°E
- Country: India
- State: Mizoram
- District: Champhai
- Block: Khawbung
- Elevation: 1,194 m (3,917 ft)

Population (2011)
  - Total: 892
- Time zone: UTC+5:30 (IST)
- 2011 census code: 271360

New Dungtlang is a village in the Champhai district of Mizoram, India. It is located in the Khawbung R.D. Block.

== Demographics ==
According to the 2011 census of India, New Dungtlang has 185 households. The effective literacy rate (i.e. the literacy rate of population excluding children aged 6 and below) is 96.44%.

Demographics (2011 Census)
	Total	Male	Female
Population	892	445	447
Children aged below 6 years	162	81	81
Scheduled caste	0	0	0
Scheduled tribe	882	440	442
Literates	704	356	348
Workers (all)	380	220	160
Main workers (total)	380	220	160
Main workers: Cultivators	337	189	148
Main workers: Agricultural labourers	0	0	0
Main workers: Household industry workers	0	0	0
Main workers: Other	43	31	12
Marginal workers (total)	0	0	0
Marginal workers: Cultivators	0	0	0
Marginal workers: Agricultural labourers	0	0	0
Marginal workers: Household industry workers	0	0	0
Marginal workers: Others	0	0	0
Non-workers	512	225	287
