= Mualkawi =

- village
- Location in Mizoram, India Mualkawi (India)
- Coordinates: 23.4191398°N 93.3332252°E
- Country: India
- State: Mizoram
- District: Champhai
- Block: Khawzawl
- Elevation: 1,302 m (4,272 ft)

Population (2011)
  - Total: 664
- Time zone: UTC+5:30 (IST)
- 2011 census code: 271326

Mualkawi is a village in the Champhai district of Mizoram, India. It is located in the Khawzawl Rural Development Block.

== Demographics ==
According to the 2011 census of India, Mualkawi has 128 households. The effective literacy rate (i.e. the literacy rate of population excluding children aged 6 and below) is 97.94%.

Demographics (2011 Census)
	Total	Male	Female
Population	664	335	329
Children aged below 6 years	129	67	62
Scheduled caste	0	0	0
Scheduled tribe	660	334	326
Literates	524	261	263
Workers (all)	243	173	70
Main workers (total)	236	170	66
Main workers: Cultivators	194	140	54
Main workers: Agricultural labourers	9	4	5
Main workers: Household industry workers	1	1	0
Main workers: Other	32	25	7
Marginal workers (total)	7	3	4
Marginal workers: Cultivators	1	1	0
Marginal workers: Agricultural labourers	2	1	1
Marginal workers: Household industry workers	0	0	0
Marginal workers: Others	4	1	3
Non-workers	421	162	259
