= Tualcheng =

- village
- Location in Mizoram, India Tualcheng (India)
- Coordinates: 23.7244299°N 93.3042731°E
- Country: India
- State: Mizoram
- District: Champhai
- Block: Champhai
- Elevation: 1,502 m (4,928 ft)

Population (2011)
  - Total: 770
- Time zone: UTC+5:30 (IST)
- 2011 census code: 271341

Tualcheng is a village in the Champhai district of Mizoram, India. It is located in the Champhai R.D. Block.

== Demographics ==
According to the 2011 census of India, Tualcheng has 157 households. The effective literacy rate (i.e. the literacy rate of population excluding children aged 6 and below) is 96.85%.

Demographics (2011 Census)
| | Total | Male | Female |
|---|---|---|---|
| Population | 770 | 384 | 386 |
| Children aged below 6 years | 136 | 72 | 64 |
| Scheduled caste | 0 | 0 | 0 |
| Scheduled tribe | 768 | 382 | 386 |
| Literates | 614 | 306 | 308 |
| Workers (all) | 412 | 215 | 197 |
| Main workers (total) | 410 | 214 | 196 |
| Main workers: Cultivators | 386 | 197 | 189 |
| Main workers: Agricultural labourers | 0 | 0 | 0 |
| Main workers: Household industry workers | 0 | 0 | 0 |
| Main workers: Other | 24 | 17 | 7 |
| Marginal workers (total) | 2 | 1 | 1 |
| Marginal workers: Cultivators | 2 | 1 | 1 |
| Marginal workers: Agricultural labourers | 0 | 0 | 0 |
| Marginal workers: Household industry workers | 0 | 0 | 0 |
| Marginal workers: Others | 0 | 0 | 0 |
| Non-workers | 358 | 169 | 189 |
