= South Khawbung =

Khawbung Khawbung
- village
- Location in Mizoram, India Khawbung (India)
- Coordinates: 23.1694725°N 93.2194039°E
- Country: India
- State: Mizoram
- District: Champhai
- Block: Khawbung
- Elevation: 1,309 m (4,295 ft)

Population (2011)
  - Total: 2,097
- Time zone: UTC+5:30 (IST)
- 2011 census code: 271368

South Khawbung is a village in the Champhai district of Mizoram, India. It is located in the Khawbung R.D. Block.

== Demographics ==
According to the 2011 census of India, South Khawbung has 444 households. The effective literacy rate (i.e. the literacy rate of population excluding children aged 6 and below) is 97.62%.

Demographics (2011 Census)
	Total	Male	Female
Population	2097	1071	1026
Children aged below 6 years	290	148	142
Scheduled caste	2	2	0
Scheduled tribe	2025	1009	1016
Literates	1764	902	862
Workers (all)	1111	646	465
Main workers (total)	1015	618	397
Main workers: Cultivators	783	445	338
Main workers: Agricultural labourers	9	4	5
Main workers: Household industry workers	4	2	2
Main workers: Other	219	167	52
Marginal workers (total)	96	28	68
Marginal workers: Cultivators	90	26	64
Marginal workers: Agricultural labourers	1	0	1
Marginal workers: Household industry workers	1	0	1
Marginal workers: Others	4	2	2
Non-workers	986	425	561
