= Khankawn =

- village
- Location in Mizoram, India Khankawn (India)
- Coordinates: 23.063782°N 93.247582°E
- Country: India
- State: Mizoram
- District: Champhai
- Block: Khawbung
- Elevation: 1,236 m (4,055 ft)

Population (2011)
  - Total: 802
- Time zone: UTC+5:30 (IST)
- 2011 census code: 271373

Khankawn is a village in the Champhai district of Mizoram, India. It is located in the Khawbung R.D. Block.

== Demographics ==
According to the 2011 census of India, Khankawn has 124 households. The effective literacy rate (i.e. the literacy rate of population excluding children aged 6 and below) is 96.21%. C. Vanlalsanga is the President of MZP Khankawn Branch.

Demographics (2011 Census)
| | Total | Male | Female |
|---|---|---|---|
| Population | 638 | 327 | 311 |
| Children aged below 6 years | 137 | 70 | 67 |
| Scheduled caste | 0 | 0 | 0 |
| Scheduled tribe | 631 | 324 | 307 |
| Literates | 482 | 252 | 230 |
| Workers (all) | 345 | 183 | 162 |
| Main workers (total) | 345 | 183 | 162 |
| Main workers: Cultivators | 331 | 174 | 157 |
| Main workers: Agricultural labourers | 0 | 0 | 0 |
| Main workers: Household industry workers | 1 | 0 | 1 |
| Main workers: Other | 13 | 9 | 4 |
| Marginal workers (total) | 0 | 0 | 0 |
| Marginal workers: Cultivators | 0 | 0 | 0 |
| Marginal workers: Agricultural labourers | 0 | 0 | 0 |
| Marginal workers: Household industry workers | 0 | 0 | 0 |
| Marginal workers: Others | 0 | 0 | 0 |
| Non-workers | 293 | 144 | 149 |
