= Tlangmawi =

- village
- Location in Mizoram, India Tlangmawi (India)
- Coordinates: 23.3479664°N 93.0778134°E
- Country: India
- State: Mizoram
- District: Champhai
- Block: Khawzawl
- Elevation: 1,299 m (4,262 ft)

Population (2011)
  - Total: 257
- Time zone: UTC+5:30 (IST)
- 2011 census code: 271335

Tlangmawi is a village in the Champhai district of Mizoram, India. It is located in the Khawzawl R.D. Block.

== Demographics ==
According to the 2011 census of India, Tlangmawi has 47 households. The effective literacy rate (i.e. the literacy rate of population excluding children aged 6 and below) is 96.71%.

Demographics (2011 Census)
	Total	Male	Female
Population	257	133	124
Children aged below 6 years	44	23	21
Scheduled caste	0	0	0
Scheduled tribe	254	132	122
Literates	206	105	101
Workers (all)	143	77	66
Main workers (total)	143	77	66
Main workers: Cultivators	130	69	61
Main workers: Agricultural labourers	0	0	0
Main workers: Household industry workers	0	0	0
Main workers: Other	13	8	5
Marginal workers (total)	0	0	0
Marginal workers: Cultivators	0	0	0
Marginal workers: Agricultural labourers	0	0	0
Marginal workers: Household industry workers	0	0	0
Marginal workers: Others	0	0	0
Non-workers	114	56	58
