= Chalrang =

- village
- Location in Mizoram, India Chalrang (India)
- Coordinates: 23.3813495°N 93.1472242°E
- Country: India
- State: Mizoram
- District: Champhai
- Block: Khawzawl
- Elevation: 1,325 m (4,347 ft)

Population (2020)
  - Total: 797
- Time zone: UTC+5:30 (IST)
- 2011 census code: 271331

Chalrang is a village in the Champhai district of Mizoram, India. It is located in the Khawzawl R.D. Block.

== Demographics ==
According to the 2011 census of India, Chalrang has 137 households. The effective literacy rate (i.e. the literacy rate of population excluding children aged 6 and below) is 98.1%.

Demographics (2011 Census)
	Total	Male	Female
Population	797	405	
Children aged below 6 years	116	60	56
Scheduled caste	0	0	0
Scheduled tribe	797	405	392
Literates	569	296	273
Workers (all)	457	240	217
Main workers (total)	269	174	95
Main workers: Cultivators	262	169	93
Main workers: Agricultural labourers	7	5	2
Main workers: Household industry workers	0	0	0
Main workers: Other	0	0	0
Marginal workers (total)	188	66	122
Marginal workers: Cultivators	185	65	120
Marginal workers: Agricultural labourers	3	1	2
Marginal workers: Household industry workers	0	0	0
Marginal workers: Others	0	0	0
Non-workers	239	111	128
