= Khualen =

- village
- Location in Mizoram, India Khualen (India)
- Coordinates: 23.6316342°N 93.193658°E
- Country: India
- State: Mizoram
- District: Champhai
- Block: Khawzawl
- Elevation: 1,039 m (3,409 ft)

Population (2011)
  - Total: 239
- Time zone: UTC+5:30 (IST)
- 2011 census code: 271310

Khualen is a village in the Khawzawl District of Mizoram, India. It is located in the Khawzawl R.D. Block.

== Demographics ==
According to the 2011 census of India, Khualen has 50 households. The effective literacy rate (i.e. the literacy rate of population excluding children aged 6 and below) is 92.39%.

Demographics (2011 Census)
	Total	Male	Female
Population	239	129	110
Children aged below 6 years	42	20	22
Scheduled caste	0	0	0
Scheduled tribe	204	107	97
Literates	182	104	78
Workers (all)	93	68	25
Main workers (total)	71	58	13
Main workers: Cultivators	31	25	6
Main workers: Agricultural labourers	9	8	1
Main workers: Household industry workers	1	1	0
Main workers: Other	30	24	6
Marginal workers (total)	22	10	12
Marginal workers: Cultivators	3	1	2
Marginal workers: Agricultural labourers	19	9	10
Marginal workers: Household industry workers	0	0	0
Marginal workers: Others	0	0	0
Non-workers	146	61	85
