= Leisenzo =

- village
- Location in Mizoram, India Leisenzo (India)
- Coordinates: 23.2884667°N 93.3256708°E
- Country: India
- State: Mizoram
- District: Champhai
- Block: Khawbung
- Elevation: 1,590 m (5,220 ft)

Population (2011)
  - Total: 796
- Time zone: UTC+5:30 (IST)
- 2011 census code: 271356

Leisenzo is a Mizo village in the Champhai district of Mizoram, India. It is located in the Khawbung R.D. Block.

== Demographics ==
According to the 2011 census of India, Leisenzo has 155 households. The effective literacy rate (i.e. the literacy rate of population excluding children aged 6 and below) is 92.63%.

Demographics (2011 Census)
| | Total | Male | Female |
|---|---|---|---|
| Population | 796 | 397 | 399 |
| Children aged below 6 years | 118 | 63 | 55 |
| Scheduled caste | 0 | 0 | 0 |
| Scheduled tribe | 795 | 397 | 398 |
| Literates | 628 | 325 | 303 |
| Workers (all) | 409 | 194 | 215 |
| Main workers (total) | 404 | 191 | 213 |
| Main workers: Cultivators | 352 | 159 | 193 |
| Main workers: Agricultural labourers | 3 | 2 | 1 |
| Main workers: Household industry workers | 2 | 1 | 1 |
| Main workers: Other | 47 | 29 | 18 |
| Marginal workers (total) | 5 | 3 | 2 |
| Marginal workers: Cultivators | 0 | 0 | 0 |
| Marginal workers: Agricultural labourers | 1 | 1 | 0 |
| Marginal workers: Household industry workers | 0 | 0 | 0 |
| Marginal workers: Others | 4 | 2 | 2 |
| Non-workers | 387 | 203 | 184 |
