= Leithum =

- village
- Location in Mizoram, India Leithum (India)
- Coordinates: 23.2406064°N 93.2677928°E
- Country: India
- State: Mizoram
- District: Champhai
- Block: Khawbung
- Elevation: 1,361 m (4,465 ft)

Population (2011)
  - Total: 546
- Time zone: UTC+5:30 (IST)
- 2011 census code: 271361

Leithum is a village in the Champhai district of Mizoram, India. It is located in the Khawbung R.D. Block.

== Demographics ==
According to the 2011 census of India, Leithum has 108 households. The effective literacy rate (i.e. the literacy rate of population excluding children aged 6 and below) is 95.26%.

Demographics (2011 Census)
	Total	Male	Female
Population	546	269	277
Children aged below 6 years	82	40	42
Scheduled caste	0	0	0
Scheduled tribe	538	264	274
Literates	442	224	218
Workers (all)	269	154	115
Main workers (total)	269	154	115
Main workers: Cultivators	237	128	109
Main workers: Agricultural labourers	1	1	0
Main workers: Household industry workers	0	0	0
Main workers: Other	31	25	6
Marginal workers (total)	0	0	0
Marginal workers: Cultivators	0	0	0
Marginal workers: Agricultural labourers	0	0	0
Marginal workers: Household industry workers	0	0	0
Marginal workers: Others	0	0	0
Non-workers	277	115	162
