= Tunkhopum Baite =

Zo nationalist leader

- Born: 10 October 1929; Singgial, Chin State, Burma.
- Died: 5 February 1967 (aged 37); Tuichang, Champhai district, Mizoram.

Tunkhopum Baite was a Zo nationalist leader known for establishing Chin Liberation Army (CLA). Earlier he founded the Baite National Covenant Council (BNCC), though his broader goal was the reunification of Chin-related tribes. To advance this vision, he travelled extensively to meet tribal leaders across the region. These efforts eventually contributed to the formation of his CLA outfit which sought to integrate the various Zo tribes under one umbrella and to secede out of India and Burma by forming a sovereign state.

== Personal life ==
Tunkhopum Baite was on born on 10 October 1929 in Singgial village, Chin State, Burma (now Myanmar). His family migrated to Manipur in 1930 and settled in Hiangtam and later Muallum village in present-day Churachandpur district, before founding Panglian village.

He studied at Mission Compound School and completed his matriculation in Imphal. During his student years, he served as a leader of the Hill Union and later the All Manipur Tribal League. He became a prominent figure in tribal politics and maintained close relations with leaders such as Rishang Keishing and Yangmaso Shaiza.

== Revolutionary activities ==
At his time, the Chin-Kuki tribes of Manipur remained on good terms, though tribe-based organizations also began to emerge among them against this backdrop, Tunkhopum Baite founded the Baite National Covenant Council for Baites. Although, his broader goal was to reunite all of the tribes. This resulted in him forming an armed group, Chin Liberation Army (CLA) or also known as Chin National Liberation Army (CNLA) on the 23rd of December, 1962 or 1961. It was simply known as "Chin Army" to the masses. He served as the President of it. Soon after its formation, the CLA began attracting national and international attention because of its armed activities. On 26 January 1963, at around 6:00 pm, the organization attacked the Sugnu Police Station and hoisted the CLA flag. During the ensuing gun battle, one member each from the CLA and the police force was killed. On the same day, the CLA also attacked the Tengnoupal BDO office at Moreh and raised its flag there.

The following day, on 27 January at approximately 2:30 am, a group of CLA cadres attacked the Singngat Police Station, killing one policeman, and again hoisted the CLA flag. The flag was also raised at Thanlon and at the SDO office in Churachandpur town. These incidents surprised the Indian government and quickly attracted both national and international attention. The events marked the beginning of the Chin national movement.

To seek foreign support for the movement, Tunkhopum Baite travelled to Rangoon in mid-1963, where he initially met officials at the Chinese Embassy. As these efforts did not meet his expectations, he subsequently approached the Pakistani Embassy. Embassy officials arranged an interview for him with Ayub Khan in Rawalpindi.

During the meeting, Tunkhopum submitted a memorandum outlining the objectives of the movement. Ayub Khan reportedly referred to a press report from the Amrita Bazar Patrika concerning CLA operations at Sugnu and Singngat police stations and asked Tunkhopum to elaborate on those incidents. According to accounts of the meeting, Ayub Khan expressed willingness to support the movement and indicated that Pakistan would provide training facilities, financial assistance, and military supplies, including arms and ammunition. Tunkhopum was also reportedly presented with commemorative gifts and thereafter became widely known as "General Tunkhopum Baite" or "Gen. Baite."

During his stay in Rawalpindi, Tunkhopum reportedly met Laldenga, who was also seeking support from the Pakistani leadership. Contemporary accounts suggest that Pakistan had already established contacts with Naga insurgent groups and later extended similar support to the CLA, while remaining cautious about assisting additional organizations from the same region.

On 1 January 1964, the first batch of CLA cadres departed for East Pakistan to undergo military training. The group consisted of fifty members, including Tunkhopum Baite and Lt. Col. Son Kho Pau Suantak. After completing a five-month training course, the cadres reportedly returned to their base camp at Teikhang in the North Mizo Hills with arms and financial assistance.

Following their return, Tunkhopum focused on recruiting members for a second batch of trainees. During this period, Laldenga sought cooperation with the CLA so that members of the Mizo National Front (MNF) could also receive training in Pakistan. The two leaders subsequently met in Aizawl and reached an understanding commonly referred to as the "Saitual Agreement." Under the arrangement, the MNF would operate primarily in the Mizo Hills, while the CLA would focus on Manipur, including areas of the Sialkal Range inhabited predominantly by Paite communities. The agreement also reportedly allowed CLA cadres to transit through the Mizo Hills into East Pakistan, while the CLA agreed to include twenty-five MNF volunteers in the second batch of military training. To avoid difficulties with Pakistani authorities, some MNF recruits were allegedly assigned temporary Chin-Paite names during the process.

The second batch of trainees departed for East Pakistan on 7 January 1966 and reached Aizawl four days later, where leaders of both organizations held discussions regarding the training programme and future cooperation. Around the same time, Tunkhopum prepared for another visit to Rawalpindi to meet Ayub Khan. According to later accounts, he changed his travel arrangements shortly before departure at the request of MNF leaders, a decision that would later be viewed by some former associates as politically consequential.

The combined group of CLA and MNF cadres later arrived at Ruma Bazar in the Rangamati district of the Chittagong Hill Tracts, where they underwent military training in a forested area near the Barak River. However, the training programme was shortened following the outbreak of the MNF uprising in the Mizo Hills. On 1 February 1966, Mizo insurgents launched coordinated attacks on Indian security installations in several towns, including Aizawl, Lunglei, Champhai and Irabung. In response to these developments, the trainees left the camp and returned home in March 1966.

After returning to the North Mizo Hills, Tunkhopum delegated responsibilities to his personal assistant, Paukhohau Khuptong, and travelled to Manipur to visit his family and recruit members for a third batch of training. During his absence, tensions reportedly developed between the CLA and the MNF, eventually straining relations between the two organizations.

Tensions between the CLA and the Mizo National Front further escalated in early 1967. In January of that year, Tunkhopum Baite was reportedly intercepted and captured by MNF cadres while returning to the CLA camp at Teikhang in the Mizo Hills. Around the same period, the MNF also attacked the CLA's Baklui camp, and several other CLA leaders were subsequently detained. Violence against Paite political leaders also intensified during this phase of the conflict. Among those killed was Suakdam, president of the Sialkal Block of the Paite National Council (PNC), who was reportedly taken from his residence and killed on 16 May 1967, along with several associates. These events led many Paite families to leave the Mizo Hills during the MNF movement.

Tunkhopum was reportedly held at the MNF headquarters camp at Tuichang and was executed on 5 February 1967. His death marked the effective decline of the CLA as an organized political and militant movement, while the MNF under Laldenga emerged as the dominant insurgent force in the region. Later narratives among sections of the Chin-Kuki-Mizo communities described Tunkhopum's death as a major setback to efforts aimed at broader political cooperation among related ethnic groups across Manipur, Mizoram and the Chin Hills.

== Legacy ==
For decades, the location of Tunkhopum's burial remained uncertain. In June 2014, his remains were reportedly recovered from the site of a former MNF camp near Muizawl in North Mizoram. They were subsequently taken to his native village of Panglian in Manipur, where he was reburied with funeral rites. The recovery team reportedly included surviving former CLA members, some of whom had earlier been arrested by Indian security forces after fleeing the Mizo Hills following the collapse of the organization

Although the movement ultimately failed to achieve its objectives, it continued to influence political consciousness among sections of the Chin-Kuki-Mizo communities. Tunkhopum Baite came to be regarded by many younger generations as an important political figure and symbol of ethnic nationalism. Supporters of the movement have argued that his activities contributed to the growth of a broader sense of unity and national identity among related tribes in the region.
