= Ngaizawl =

- village
- Location in Mizoram, India Ngaizawl (India)
- Coordinates: 23.5411591°N 93.2564768°E
- Country: India
- State: Mizoram
- District: Champhai
- Block: Khawzawl
- Elevation: 1,487 m (4,879 ft)

Population (2011)
  - Total: 797
- Time zone: UTC+5:30 (IST)
- 2011 census code: 271315

Ngaizawl is a Mizo village in the Champhai district of Mizoram, India. It is located in the Khawzawl R.D. Block.

== Demographics ==
According to the 2011 census of India, Ngaizawl has 144 households. The effective literacy rate (i.e. the literacy rate of population excluding children aged 6 and below) is 85.17%.

Demographics (2011 Census)
	Total	Male	Female
Population	797	397	400
Children aged below 6 years	197	100	97
Scheduled caste	0	0	0
Scheduled tribe	792	393	399
Literates	511	267	244
Workers (all)	354	181	173
Main workers (total)	251	155	96
Main workers: Cultivators	156	90	66
Main workers: Agricultural labourers	62	41	21
Main workers: Household industry workers	10	6	4
Main workers: Other	23	18	5
Marginal workers (total)	103	26	77
Marginal workers: Cultivators	59	15	44
Marginal workers: Agricultural labourers	30	11	19
Marginal workers: Household industry workers	10	0	10
Marginal workers: Others	4	0	4
Non-workers	443	216	227
