= Mualzen =

- village
- Location in Mizoram, India Mualzen (India)
- Coordinates: 23.429142°N 93.245049°E
- Country: India
- State: Mizoram
- District: Champhai
- Block: Khawzawl
- Elevation: 1,283 m (4,209 ft)

Population (2011)
  - Total: 12
- Time zone: UTC+5:30 (IST)
- 2011 census code: 271324

Mualzen is a village in the Champhai district of Mizoram, India. It is located in the Khawzawl R.D. Block.

== Demographics ==
According to the 2011 census of India, Mualzen has 3 households. The effective literacy rate (i.e. the literacy rate of population excluding children aged 6 and below) is 100%.

Demographics (2011 Census)
	Total	Male	Female
Population	12	6	6
Children aged below 6 years	1	0	1
Scheduled caste	0	0	0
Scheduled tribe	12	6	6
Literates	11	6	5
Workers (all)	8	5	3
Main workers (total)	8	5	3
Main workers: Cultivators	2	2	0
Main workers: Agricultural labourers	6	3	3
Main workers: Household industry workers	0	0	0
Main workers: Other	0	0	0
Marginal workers (total)	0	0	0
Marginal workers: Cultivators	0	0	0
Marginal workers: Agricultural labourers	0	0	0
Marginal workers: Household industry workers	0	0	0
Marginal workers: Others	0	0	0
Non-workers	4	1	3
