= Vapar =

- Village
- Location in Mizoram, India Vapar (India)
- Coordinates: 23.6194445°N 93.3495969°E
- Country: India
- State: Mizoram
- District: Champhai
- Block: Champhai
- Elevation: 1,414 m (4,639 ft)

Population (2011)
  - Total: 891
- Time zone: UTC+5:30 (IST)
- 2011 census code: 271346

Vapar is a Mizo village in the Champhai district of Mizoram, India. It is located in the Champhai R.D. Block.

== Demographics ==
According to the 2011 census of India, Vaapar has 184 households. The effective literacy rate (i.e. the literacy rate of population excluding children aged 6 and below) is 89.94%.

Demographics (2011 Census)
| | Total | Male | Female |
|---|---|---|---|
| Population | 891 | 481 | 410 |
| Children aged below 6 years | 205 | 115 | 90 |
| Scheduled caste | 2 | 2 | 0 |
| Scheduled tribe | 868 | 465 | 403 |
| Literates | 617 | 347 | 270 |
| Workers (all) | 401 | 244 | 157 |
| Main workers (total) | 357 | 241 | 116 |
| Main workers: Cultivators | 251 | 159 | 92 |
| Main workers: Agricultural labourers | 48 | 35 | 13 |
| Main workers: Household industry workers | 2 | 1 | 1 |
| Main workers: Other | 56 | 46 | 10 |
| Marginal workers (total) | 44 | 3 | 41 |
| Marginal workers: Cultivators | 26 | 3 | 23 |
| Marginal workers: Agricultural labourers | 16 | 0 | 16 |
| Marginal workers: Household industry workers | 0 | 0 | 0 |
| Marginal workers: Others | 2 | 0 | 2 |
| Non-workers | 490 | 237 | 253 |
