= Khuangleng =

- village
- Location in Mizoram, India Khuangleng (India)
- Coordinates: 23.3065745°N 93.3130828°E
- Country: India
- State: Mizoram
- District: Champhai
- Block: Khawbung
- Elevation: 1,479 m (4,852 ft)

Population (2011)
  - Total: 1,686
- Time zone: UTC+5:30 (IST)
- 2011 census code: 271351

Khuangleng is a village in the Champhai district of Mizoram, India. It is located in the Khawbung R.D. Block.

== Demographics ==
According to the 2011 census of India, Khuangleng has 334 households. The effective literacy rate (i.e. the literacy rate of population excluding children aged 6 and below) is 97.55%.

Demographics (2011 Census)
	Total	Male	Female
Population	1686	846	840
Children aged below 6 years	299	158	141
Scheduled caste	0	0	0
Scheduled tribe	1674	840	834
Literates	1353	679	674
Workers (all)	843	455	388
Main workers (total)	835	449	386
Main workers: Cultivators	751	385	366
Main workers: Agricultural labourers	14	9	5
Main workers: Household industry workers	0	0	0
Main workers: Other	70	55	15
Marginal workers (total)	8	6	2
Marginal workers: Cultivators	2	2	0
Marginal workers: Agricultural labourers	3	1	2
Marginal workers: Household industry workers	0	0	0
Marginal workers: Others	3	3	0
Non-workers	843	391	452
