= Tualpui =

- village
- Location in Mizoram, India Tualpui (India)
- Coordinates: 23.5874964°N 93.2439066°E
- Country: India
- State: Mizoram
- District: Champhai
- Block: Khawzawl
- Elevation: 1,344 m (4,409 ft)

Population (2011)
  - Total: 589
- Time zone: UTC+5:30 (IST)
- 2011 census code: 271314

Tualpui is a village in the Champhai district of Mizoram, India. It is located in the Khawzawl R.D. Block.

== Demographics ==
According to the 2011 census of India, Tualpui has 113 households. The effective literacy rate (i.e. the literacy rate of population excluding children aged 6 and below) is 93.22%.

Demographics (2011 Census)
	Total	Male	Female
Population	589	290	299
Children aged below 6 years	102	55	47
Scheduled caste	0	0	0
Scheduled tribe	586	289	297
Literates	454	226	228
Workers (all)	321	167	154
Main workers (total)	321	167	154
Main workers: Cultivators	297	146	151
Main workers: Agricultural labourers	0	0	0
Main workers: Household industry workers	0	0	0
Main workers: Other	24	21	3
Marginal workers (total)	0	0	0
Marginal workers: Cultivators	0	0	0
Marginal workers: Agricultural labourers	0	0	0
Marginal workers: Household industry workers	0	0	0
Marginal workers: Others	0	0	0
Non-workers	268	123	145
