= Vanzau =

Village in Mizoram, India

- village
- Location in Mizoram, India Vanzau (India)
- Coordinates: 23.2461875°N 93.2495628°E
- Country: India
- State: Mizoram
- District: Champhai
- Block: Khawbung
- Elevation: 1,301 m (4,268 ft)

Population (2011)
  - Total: 657
- Time zone: UTC+5:30 (IST)
- 2011 census code: 271358

Vanzau is a village in the Champhai district of Mizoram, India. It is located in the Khawbung R.D. Block.

== Demographics ==
According to the 2011 census of India, Vanzau has 149 households. The effective literacy rate (i.e. the literacy rate of population excluding children aged 6 and below) is 87.16%.

Demographics (2011 Census)
	Total	Male	Female
Population	657	345	312
Children aged below 6 years	112	60	52
Scheduled caste	0	0	0
Scheduled tribe	649	341	308
Literates	475	263	212
Workers (all)	242	166	76
Main workers (total)	242	166	76
Main workers: Cultivators	213	145	68
Main workers: Agricultural labourers	0	0	0
Main workers: Household industry workers	1	1	0
Main workers: Other	28	20	8
Marginal workers (total)	0	0	0
Marginal workers: Cultivators	0	0	0
Marginal workers: Agricultural labourers	0	0	0
Marginal workers: Household industry workers	0	0	0
Marginal workers: Others	0	0	0
Non-workers	415	179	236
