= Lungphunlian =

- village
- Location in Mizoram, India Lungphunlian (India)
- Coordinates: 23.7570904°N 93.3055316°E
- Country: India
- State: Mizoram
- District: Champhai
- Block: Champhai
- Elevation: 1,466 m (4,810 ft)

Population (2011)
  - Total: 384
- Time zone: UTC+5:30 (IST)
- 2011 census code: 271342

Lungphunlian is a village in the Champhai district of Mizoram, India. It is located in the Champhai R.D. Block.

== Demographics ==
According to the 2011 census of India, Lungphunlian has 81 households. The literacy rate of the village is 80.99%.

Demographics (2011 Census)
	Total	Male	Female
Population	384	204	180
Children aged below 6 years	72	40	32
Scheduled caste	0	0	0
Scheduled tribe	375	201	174
Literates	311	163	148
Workers (all)	238	119	119
Main workers (total)	236	118	118
Main workers: Cultivators	218	108	110
Main workers: Agricultural labourers	1	1	0
Main workers: Household industry workers	1	1	0
Main workers: Other	16	8	8
Marginal workers (total)	2	1	1
Marginal workers: Cultivators	0	0	0
Marginal workers: Agricultural labourers	0	0	0
Marginal workers: Household industry workers	0	0	0
Marginal workers: Others	2	1	1
Non-workers	146	85	61
