= Lungtan =

- village
- Location in Mizoram, India Lungtan (India)
- Coordinates: 23.3837587°N 93.1008348°E
- Country: India
- State: Mizoram
- District: Champhai
- Block: Khawzawl
- Elevation: 1,247 m (4,091 ft)

Population (2011)
  - Total: 658
- Time zone: UTC+5:30 (IST)
- 2011 census code: 271334

Lungtan is a village in the Champhai district of Mizoram, India. It is located in the Khawzawl R.D. Block.

== Demographics ==
According to the 2011 census of India, Lungtan has 115 households. The effective literacy rate (i.e. the literacy rate of population excluding children aged 6 and below) is 96.29%.

Demographics (2011 Census)
	Total	Male	Female
Population	658	340	318
Children aged below 6 years	119	59	60
Scheduled caste	0	0	0
Scheduled tribe	658	340	318
Literates	519	272	247
Workers (all)	354	193	161
Main workers (total)	354	193	161
Main workers: Cultivators	318	173	145
Main workers: Agricultural labourers	2	2	0
Main workers: Household industry workers	12	7	5
Main workers: Other	22	11	11
Marginal workers (total)	0	0	0
Marginal workers: Cultivators	0	0	0
Marginal workers: Agricultural labourers	0	0	0
Marginal workers: Household industry workers	0	0	0
Marginal workers: Others	0	0	0
Non-workers	304	147	157
