= New Samthang =

- village
- Location in Mizoram, India New Samthang (India)
- Coordinates: 23.14596°N 93.248612°E
- Country: India
- State: Mizoram
- District: Champhai
- Block: Khawbung
- Elevation: 993 m (3,258 ft)

Population (2011)
  - Total: 52
- Time zone: UTC+5:30 (IST)
- 2011 census code: 271367

New Samthang is a village in the Champhai district of Mizoram, India. It is located in the Khawbung R.D. Block.

== Demographics ==
According to the 2011 census of India, New Samthang has 13 households. The effective literacy rate (i.e. the literacy rate of population excluding children aged 6 and below) is 100%.

Demographics (2011 Census)
	Total	Male	Female
Population	52	29	23
Children aged below 6 years	8	5	3
Scheduled caste	0	0	0
Scheduled tribe	52	29	23
Literates	44	24	20
Workers (all)	32	18	14
Main workers (total)	32	18	14
Main workers: Cultivators	30	18	12
Main workers: Agricultural labourers	0	0	0
Main workers: Household industry workers	0	0	0
Main workers: Other	2	0	2
Marginal workers (total)	0	0	0
Marginal workers: Cultivators	0	0	0
Marginal workers: Agricultural labourers	0	0	0
Marginal workers: Household industry workers	0	0	0
Marginal workers: Others	0	0	0
Non-workers	20	11	9
