= Vankal =

Vankal may refer to:

- Vankal, Champhai, a village in Mizoram, India
- Vankal, Surat, a locality in Gujarat, India
