= Rabung =

- village
- Location in Mizoram, India Rabung (India)
- Coordinates: 23.6842241°N 93.2018198°E
- Country: India
- State: Mizoram
- District: Champhai
- Block: Khawzawl
- Elevation: 1,244 m (4,081 ft)

Population (2011)
  - Total: 1,528
- Time zone: UTC+5:30 (IST)
- 2011 census code: 271311

Rabung is a village in the Champhai district of Mizoram, India. It is located in the Khawzawl R.D. Block.

== Demographics ==
According to the 2011 census of India, Rabung has 295 households. The effective literacy rate (i.e. the literacy rate of population excluding children aged 6 and below) is 94.04%.

Demographics (2011 Census)
	Total	Male	Female
Population	1528	777	751
Children aged below 6 years	304	152	152
Scheduled caste	0	0	0
Scheduled tribe	1515	769	746
Literates	1151	605	546
Workers (all)	791	421	370
Main workers (total)	791	421	370
Main workers: Cultivators	734	380	354
Main workers: Agricultural labourers	0	0	0
Main workers: Household industry workers	1	1	0
Main workers: Other	56	40	16
Marginal workers (total)	0	0	0
Marginal workers: Cultivators	0	0	0
Marginal workers: Agricultural labourers	0	0	0
Marginal workers: Household industry workers	0	0	0
Marginal workers: Others	0	0	0
Non-workers	737	356	381
