= Melbuk-Khawnuam =

- village
- Location in Mizoram, India Melbuk-Khawnuam (India)
- Coordinates: 23.370422°N 93.362923°E
- Country: India
- State: Mizoram
- District: Champhai
- Block: Khawzawl
- Elevation: 1,056 m (3,465 ft)

Population (2011)
  - Total: 533
- Time zone: UTC+5:30 (IST)
- 2011 census code: 271327

Melbuk-Khawnuam is a census village in the Champhai district of Mizoram, India. It is located in the Khawzawl R.D. Block.

== Demographics ==
According to the 2011 census of India, Melbuk (Khawnuam) has 123 households. The literacy rate of the village is 76.92%.

Demographics (2011 Census)
	Total	Male	Female
Population	533	268	265
Children aged below 6 years	98	59	39
Scheduled caste	0	0	0
Scheduled tribe	532	268	264
Literates	410	206	204
Workers (all)	205	130	75
Main workers (total)	193	125	68
Main workers: Cultivators	128	79	49
Main workers: Agricultural labourers	7	4	3
Main workers: Household industry workers	2	1	1
Main workers: Other	56	41	15
Marginal workers (total)	12	5	7
Marginal workers: Cultivators	3	1	2
Marginal workers: Agricultural labourers	3	2	1
Marginal workers: Household industry workers	1	0	1
Marginal workers: Others	5	2	3
Non-workers	328	138	190
