= Vangtlang =

- village
- Location in Mizoram, India Vangtlang (India)
- Coordinates: 23.3643119°N 93.1811039°E
- Country: India
- State: Mizoram
- District: Champhai
- Block: Khawzawl
- Elevation: 1,283 m (4,209 ft)

Population (2011)
  - Total: 521
- Time zone: UTC+5:30 (IST)
- 2011 census code: 271330

Vangtlang is a village in the Champhai district of Mizoram, India. It is located in the Khawzawl R.D. Block.

== Demographics ==
According to the 2011 census of India, Vangtlang has 93 households. The effective literacy rate (i.e. the literacy rate of population excluding children aged 6 and below) is 99.11%.

Demographics (2011 Census)
	Total	Male	Female
Population	521	280	241
Children aged below 6 years	72	37	35
Scheduled caste	0	0	0
Scheduled tribe	517	277	240
Literates	445	241	204
Workers (all)	299	167	132
Main workers (total)	299	167	132
Main workers: Cultivators	276	149	127
Main workers: Agricultural labourers	0	0	0
Main workers: Household industry workers	2	2	0
Main workers: Other	21	16	5
Marginal workers (total)	0	0	0
Marginal workers: Cultivators	0	0	0
Marginal workers: Agricultural labourers	0	0	0
Marginal workers: Household industry workers	0	0	0
Marginal workers: Others	0	0	0
Non-workers	222	113	109
