= Bulfekzawl =

- village
- Location in Mizoram, India Bulfekzawl (India)
- Coordinates: 23.3173743°N 93.3647141°E
- Country: India
- State: Mizoram
- District: Champhai
- Block: Khawbung
- Elevation: 764 m (2,507 ft)

Population (2011)
  - Total: 351
- Time zone: UTC+5:30 (IST)
- 2011 census code: 271352

Bulfekzawl is a village in the Champhai district of Mizoram, India. It is located in the Khawbung R.D. Block.

== Demographics ==
According to the 2011 census of India, Bulfekzawl has 61 households. The effective literacy rate (i.e. the literacy rate of population excluding children aged 6 and below) is 99.31%.

Demographics (2011 Census)
	Total	Male	Female
Population	351	184	167
Children aged below 6 years	62	34	28
Scheduled caste	0	0	0
Scheduled tribe	350	184	166
Literates	287	150	137
Workers (all)	109	83	26
Main workers (total)	108	83	25
Main workers: Cultivators	94	75	19
Main workers: Agricultural labourers	0	0	0
Main workers: Household industry workers	0	0	0
Main workers: Other	14	8	6
Marginal workers (total)	1	0	1
Marginal workers: Cultivators	1	0	1
Marginal workers: Agricultural labourers	0	0	0
Marginal workers: Household industry workers	0	0	0
Marginal workers: Others	0	0	0
Non-workers	242	101	141
