= Zawngtetui =

- village
- Location in Mizoram, India Zawngtetui (India)
- Coordinates: 23.3174517°N 93.2187758°E
- Country: India
- State: Mizoram
- District: Champhai
- Block: Khawbung
- Elevation: 1,150 m (3,770 ft)

Population (2011)
  - Total: 201
- Time zone: UTC+5:30 (IST)
- 2011 census code: 271349

Zawngtetui is a village in the Champhai district of Mizoram, India. It is located in the Khawbung rural development block.

== Demographics ==
According to the 2011 census of India, Zawngtetui has 44 households. The effective literacy rate (i.e. the literacy rate of population excluding children aged 6 and below) is 94.84%.

Demographics (2011 Census)
	Total	Male	Female
Population	201	110	91
Children aged below 6 years	46	27	19
Scheduled caste	0	0	0
Scheduled tribe	197	108	89
Literates	147	79	68
Workers (all)	93	53	40
Main workers (total)	93	53	40
Main workers: Cultivators	87	49	38
Main workers: Agricultural labourers	0	0	0
Main workers: Household industry workers	0	0	0
Main workers: Other	6	4	2
Marginal workers (total)	0	0	0
Marginal workers: Cultivators	0	0	0
Marginal workers: Agricultural labourers	0	0	0
Marginal workers: Household industry workers	0	0	0
Marginal workers: Others	0	0	0
Non-workers	108	57	51
