= Hmuncheng =

- village
- Location in Mizoram, India Hmuncheng (India)
- Coordinates: 23.4698983°N 93.1243374°E
- Country: India
- State: Mizoram
- District: Champhai
- Block: Khawzawl
- Elevation: 1,074 m (3,524 ft)

Population (2011)
  - Total: 347
- Time zone: UTC+5:30 (IST)
- 2011 census code: 271321

Hmuncheng is a village in the Champhai district of Mizoram, India. It is located in the Khawzawl R.D. Block.

== Demographics ==
According to the 2011 census of India, Hmuncheng has 74 households. The effective literacy rate (i.e. the literacy rate of population excluding children aged 6 and below) is 83.14%.

Demographics (2011 Census)
	Total	Male	Female
Population	347	183	164
Children aged below 6 years	86	42	44
Scheduled caste	0	0	0
Scheduled tribe	342	180	162
Literates	217	119	98
Workers (all)	160	85	75
Main workers (total)	158	83	75
Main workers: Cultivators	151	79	72
Main workers: Agricultural labourers	1	1	0
Main workers: Household industry workers	0	0	0
Main workers: Other	6	3	3
Marginal workers (total)	2	2	0
Marginal workers: Cultivators	1	1	0
Marginal workers: Agricultural labourers	0	0	0
Marginal workers: Household industry workers	0	0	0
Marginal workers: Others	1	1	0
Non-workers	187	98	89
