= Puilo =

- village
- Location in Mizoram, India Puilo (India)
- Coordinates: 23.57009°N 93.075778°E
- Country: India
- State: Mizoram
- District: Champhai
- Block: Khawzawl
- Elevation: 1,052 m (3,451 ft)

Population (2011)
  - Total: 474
- Time zone: UTC+5:30 (IST)
- 2011 census code: 271319

Puilo is a village in the Champhai district of Mizoram, India. It is located in the Khawzawl R.D. Block.

== Demographics ==
According to the 2011 census of India, Puilo has 96 households. The effective literacy rate (i.e. the literacy rate of population excluding children aged 6 and below) is 96.92%.

Demographics (2011 Census)
	Total	Male	Female
Population	474	265	209
Children aged below 6 years	84	52	32
Scheduled caste	0	0	0
Scheduled tribe	473	264	209
Literates	378	205	173
Workers (all)	271	148	123
Main workers (total)	271	148	123
Main workers: Cultivators	259	137	122
Main workers: Agricultural labourers	0	0	0
Main workers: Household industry workers	0	0	0
Main workers: Other	12	11	1
Marginal workers (total)	0	0	0
Marginal workers: Cultivators	0	0	0
Marginal workers: Agricultural labourers	0	0	0
Marginal workers: Household industry workers	0	0	0
Marginal workers: Others	0	0	0
Non-workers	203	117	86
