= Pamchung =

- village
- Location in Mizoram, India Pamchung (India)
- Coordinates: 23.725833°N 93.2376227°E
- Country: India
- State: Mizoram
- District: Champhai
- Block: Khawzawl
- Elevation: 1,175 m (3,855 ft)

Population (2011)
  - Total: 303
- Time zone: UTC+5:30 (IST)
- 2011 census code: 271313

Pamchung is a village in the Champhai district of Mizoram, India. It is located in the Khawzawl R.D. Block.

== Demographics ==
According to the 2011 census of India, Pamchung has 63 households. The effective literacy rate (i.e. the literacy rate of population excluding children aged 6 and below) is 100%.

Demographics (2011 Census)
	Total	Male	Female
Population	303	151	152
Children aged below 6 years	68	32	36
Scheduled caste	0	0	0
Scheduled tribe	302	150	152
Literates	235	119	116
Workers (all)	189	95	94
Main workers (total)	179	93	86
Main workers: Cultivators	167	87	80
Main workers: Agricultural labourers	0	0	0
Main workers: Household industry workers	0	0	0
Main workers: Other	12	6	6
Marginal workers (total)	10	2	8
Marginal workers: Cultivators	9	2	7
Marginal workers: Agricultural labourers	0	0	0
Marginal workers: Household industry workers	0	0	0
Marginal workers: Others	1	0	1
Non-workers	114	56	58
