= Sazep =

Sazep Sạzêp
- village
- Location in Mizoram, India Sazep (India)
- Coordinates: 23.2354386°N 93.3017564°E
- Country: India
- State: Mizoram
- District: Champhai
- Block: Khawbung
- Elevation: 1,441 m (4,728 ft)

Population (2011)
  - Total: 649
- Time zone: UTC+5:30 (IST)
- PIN: 796321
- 2011 census code: 271362

Sazep is a village in the Champhai district of Mizoram, India. It is located in the Khawbung R.D. Block.

== Demographics ==
According to the 2011 census of India, Sazep has 111 households. The effective literacy rate (i.e. the literacy rate of population excluding children aged 6 and below) is 93.53%.

Demographics (2011 Census)
	Total	Male	Female
Population	649	326	323
Children aged below 6 years	108	52	56
Scheduled caste	0	0	0
Scheduled tribe	628	315	313
Literates	506	258	248
Workers (all)	234	157	77
Main workers (total)	234	157	77
Main workers: Cultivators	204	134	70
Main workers: Agricultural labourers	0	0	0
Main workers: Household industry workers	0	0	0
Main workers: Other	30	23	7
Marginal workers (total)	0	0	0
Marginal workers: Cultivators	0	0	0
Marginal workers: Agricultural labourers	0	0	0
Marginal workers: Household industry workers	0	0	0
Marginal workers: Others	0	0	0
Non-workers	415	169	246
