= Neihdawn =

Village in Mizoram

- village
- Location in Mizoram, India Neihdawn (India)
- Coordinates: 23.5059033°N 93.2409872°E
- Country: India
- State: Mizoram
- District: Champhai
- Block: Khawzawl
- Panchayat: 3
- Elevation: 1,441 m (4,728 ft)

Population (2011)
  - Total: 607
- Time zone: UTC+5:30 (IST)
- Postal code: 796310
- 2011 census code: 271316

Neihdawn is a village in the Champhai district of Mizoram, India. It is located in the Khawzawl R.D. Block.

== Demographics ==
According to the 2011 census of India, Neihdawn has 116 households. The effective literacy rate (i.e. the literacy rate of population excluding children aged 6 and below) is 97.21%.

Demographics (2011 Census)
	Total	Male	Female
Population	607	295	312
Children aged below 6 years	106	52	54
Scheduled caste	0	0	0
Scheduled tribe	607	295	312
Literates	487	239	248
Workers (all)	339	167	172
Main workers (total)	339	167	172
Main workers: Cultivators	314	147	167
Main workers: Agricultural labourers	0	0	0
Main workers: Household industry workers	0	0	0
Main workers: Other	25	20	5
Marginal workers (total)	0	0	0
Marginal workers: Cultivators	0	0	0
Marginal workers: Agricultural labourers	0	0	0
Marginal workers: Household industry workers	0	0	0
Marginal workers: Others	0	0	0
Non-workers	268	128	140
