= New Hruaikawn =

- village
- Location in Mizoram, India New Hruaikawn (India)
- Coordinates: 23.293104°N 93.3565519°E
- Country: India
- State: Mizoram
- District: Champhai
- Block: Khawbung
- Elevation: 909 m (2,982 ft)

Population (2011)
  - Total: 178
- Time zone: UTC+5:30 (IST)
- 2011 census code: 271354

New Hruaikawn is a village in the Champhai district of Mizoram, India. It is located in the Khawbung R.D. Block.

== Demographics ==
According to the 2011 census of India, New Hruaikawn has 39 households. The effective literacy rate (i.e. the literacy rate of population excluding children aged 6 and below) is 87.59%.

Demographics (2011 Census)
	Total	Male	Female
Population	178	92	86
Children aged below 6 years	41	23	18
Scheduled caste	0	0	0
Scheduled tribe	177	92	85
Literates	120	61	59
Workers (all)	88	53	35
Main workers (total)	88	53	35
Main workers: Cultivators	71	40	31
Main workers: Agricultural labourers	0	0	0
Main workers: Household industry workers	1	1	0
Main workers: Other	16	12	4
Marginal workers (total)	0	0	0
Marginal workers: Cultivators	0	0	0
Marginal workers: Agricultural labourers	0	0	0
Marginal workers: Household industry workers	0	0	0
Marginal workers: Others	0	0	0
Non-workers	90	39	51
