= Vankal, Champhai =

Vankal
- village
- Location in Mizoram, India Vankal (India)
- Coordinates: 23.6255513°N 93.1271584°E
- Country: India
- State: Mizoram
- District: Champhai
- Block: Khawzawl
- Elevation: 1,192 m (3,911 ft)

Population (2011)
  - Total: 326
- Time zone: UTC+5:30 (IST)
- 2011 census code: 271309

Vankal is a village in the Champhai district of Mizoram, India. It is located in the Khawzawl R.D. Block.

== Demographics ==
According to the 2011 census of India, Vankal has 77 households. The effective literacy rate (i.e. the literacy rate of population excluding children aged 6 and below) is 96.9%.

Demographics (2011 Census)
	Total	Male	Female
Population	326	182	144
Children aged below 6 years	36	22	14
Scheduled caste	0	0	0
Scheduled tribe	309	173	136
Literates	281	157	124
Workers (all)	207	119	88
Main workers (total)	206	118	88
Main workers: Cultivators	199	111	88
Main workers: Agricultural labourers	0	0	0
Main workers: Household industry workers	0	0	0
Main workers: Other	7	7	0
Marginal workers (total)	1	1	0
Marginal workers: Cultivators	0	0	0
Marginal workers: Agricultural labourers	0	0	0
Marginal workers: Household industry workers	0	0	0
Marginal workers: Others	1	1	0
Non-workers	119	63	56
