= Vankal, Surat =

Vankal
- Neighbourhood
- Country: India
- State: Gujarat
- District: Surat

Government
  - Body: Surat District Panchayat

Languages
  - Official: Gujarati, Hindi
- Time zone: UTC+5:30 (IST)
- PIN: 394430
- Telephone code: 91-2629-243-XXX
- Vehicle registration: GJ
- Lok Sabha constituency: Bardoli
- Civic agency: Surat District Panchayat
- Website: gujaratindia.gov.in

Vankal is a village located in Surat District, India.

== See also ==
- List of tourist attractions in Surat
