= Zo Reunification Organization =

- Abbreviation: ZORO
- Formation: 20 May 1988; 38 years ago
- Founded at: Champhai, Mizoram, India
- Type: Non-Governmental Organization (NGO)
- Purpose: Advocacy for Zo ethnic group unification
- Headquarters: Aizawl, Mizoram, India
- Region served: India, Myanmar, and Bangladesh
- Methods: Advocacy, cultural preservation, policy representation
- Official language: English, Mizo, and other Zo languages
- President: R. Sangkawia

The Zo Reunification Organization (ZORO) is a non-governmental organization based in Aizawl, Mizoram, India, that campaigns for the unification of the Zo people, an ethnic group encompassing the Mizos, Chins, Kukis, and Zomis, who are spread across Northeast India, Myanmar, and Bangladesh. It was founded at the First World Zomi Convention in Champhai on 20 May 1988 as a "loose political forum" intended to pursue reunification through peaceful and democratic means. Since 1999 it has engaged with United Nations bodies on indigenous peoples' rights and is a registered participant in the UN Department of Economic and Social Affairs.

== Background ==
The Zo people, historically known by the exonyms Chin, Kuki, and Lushai, inhabited a contiguous highland region spanning what is now Mizoram, Manipur, parts of Assam and Tripura in India, Myanmar's Chin State, and the Chittagong Hill Tracts in Bangladesh. British colonial administrators divided this territory among three administrative units in 1890: the Chief Commissioner of Burma, the Chief Commissioner of Assam, and the Lieutenant-Governor of Bengal. Successive proposals to reunify the Chin-Lushai country under one administration, including one by the Governor of Assam, Sir Robert Reid, in 1941, which received in-principle approval from Winston Churchill were never carried out. The partition of British India in 1947 and Burmese independence in 1948 further entrenched these divisions along international borders.

Movements for Zo political unity arose periodically in the post-independence era. The Mizo National Front (MNF) launched an armed insurgency in 1966 with the stated goal of establishing an independent state for all Zo-inhabited areas. In Manipur, T. Gougin founded the Zomi National Congress (ZNC) in 1972 to campaign for the unification of the Zomi of India and Burma and submitted a memorandum to President V. V. Giri.

== Formation ==
In 1986, the Mizoram Peace Accord ended the MNF insurgency, and Mizoram attained full statehood. The MNF transformed into a political party and won the 1987 state election, making Mizoram the first democratic Zo-majority state. T. Gougin of the ZNC had met MNF leader Laldenga to discuss cooperation, but the two disagreed over naming: Gougin favoured "Zomi" while Laldenga insisted on "Mizo". (Note: "Zomi" means "Zo people" and "Mizo" means "people of Zo"—the semantic content is identical, but the preferred form became a point of political contention.)

On 5 April 1988, the ZNC and the Mizoram People's Conference (MPC), now in opposition, signed a pact to organise a convention jointly. The First World Zomi Convention was held in Champhai from 19 to 21 May 1988. An estimated 20,000 people attended, the great majority from Mizoram and Manipur, with smaller delegations from Assam, Myanmar's Chin State, and the Chittagong Hill Tracts of Bangladesh.

The convention adopted "Zo" as the common ethnic name for the entire Kuki-Chin community, the delegates reasoning that the suffix "mi" (meaning "people") was redundant in a community name. It then resolved to form a "loose political forum" called the Zo Re-unification Organisation. MPC leader T. Sailo was elected Chairman, T. Gougin and C. Chawngkunga became Vice Chairmen, S. Thangkhangin Ngaihte and Lalhmingthanga served as Secretary General, and Thangmawia was named Treasurer. The delegates stipulated that ZORO would not interfere with the local political programmes of its constituent parties. After the convention, a long march of volunteers was taken from Champhai to Aizawl to mark the occasion.

(Note: Some contemporary reports referred to the body as the "Zomi Reunification Organisation", apparently deriving the name from the convention rather than the resolution itself. The confusion between the two names persists. A separate body, the Zomi Reunification Organisation, was established in 1993 at Phapian in Myanmar's Kachin State and is headquartered in Churachandpur.)

== International engagement ==
ZORO has pursued its aims through international forums. Since 1999 it has participated in sessions of the United Nations Working Group on Indigenous Populations (UNWGIP), and since 2004 in the United Nations Permanent Forum on Indigenous Issues (UNPFII). The organisation has also attended conferences convened by the World Trade Organization, the World Bank, and the UN Expert Mechanism on the Rights of Indigenous Peoples. In November 2024, ZORO submitted a memorandum to the United Nations calling for the reunification of ethnic Mizos across international borders.

== Free Movement Regime controversy ==
The Free Movement Regime (FMR), introduced by India and Myanmar, allowed residents within 16 kilometres of the 1,643-km Indo-Myanmar border to cross without visas, facilitating trade, kinship ties, and cultural exchange among the Zo communities on both sides.

In May 2024, ZORO held a large public rally at Zokhawthar, a border town in Champhai district, to protest the Indian government's plans to fence the border and revoke the FMR. The rally drew participants from the ruling Zoram People's Party as well as villagers from neighbouring Myanmar. ZORO general secretary L. Ramdinliana Renthlei warned that the proposed measures would be perceived by the Zo people as an act of permanent separation. Similar rallies were held in Lunglei district and Manipur's Tengnoupal district.

When the Indian government replaced the FMR with a border pass system effective 1 January 2025, ZORO organised protests across Mizoram, including in Aizawl, Champhai, Lunglei, Kolasib, and Serchhip; at which copies of the government order were symbolically burned. The organisation announced plans to work with the Mizo Zirlai Pawl (MZP), a student body, to demand reinstatement of the FMR at the national level.

== Manipur crisis and peace efforts ==
Following ethnic clashes in Manipur in 2023, ZORO organised a rally in Aizawl on 12 July 2023, calling for the protection of Zo communities and a unified Zo homeland. The Mizoram state government and several NGOs assisted in sheltering refugees from Manipur who had fled to Mizoram.

In 2024, ZORO facilitated peace talks among Zo-affiliated resistance groups in Myanmar's Chin State, including the Chin National Army (CNA), the Zomi Revolutionary Army (ZRA), and the Chin Brotherhood Alliance (CBA). The talks sought to resolve inter-group conflicts and consolidate opposition to the military junta.

In March 2025, ZORO met Indian Home Minister Amit Shah during his visit to Mizoram and requested a separate administrative arrangement for the Kuki (Zo) people of Manipur, arguing that coexistence under the same governance as the Meitei majority had become untenable.

== Organisation ==
ZORO's general headquarters is in Aizawl. It is led by an elected body consisting of a chairman (later styled president), vice chairman, secretary general, treasurer, and other officials. As of 2023, R. Sangkawia served as president and Rohmingthanga Kawlni as vice president. The founding chairman, R. Thangmawia, died on 20 July 2015.
