= Champhai =

- Town
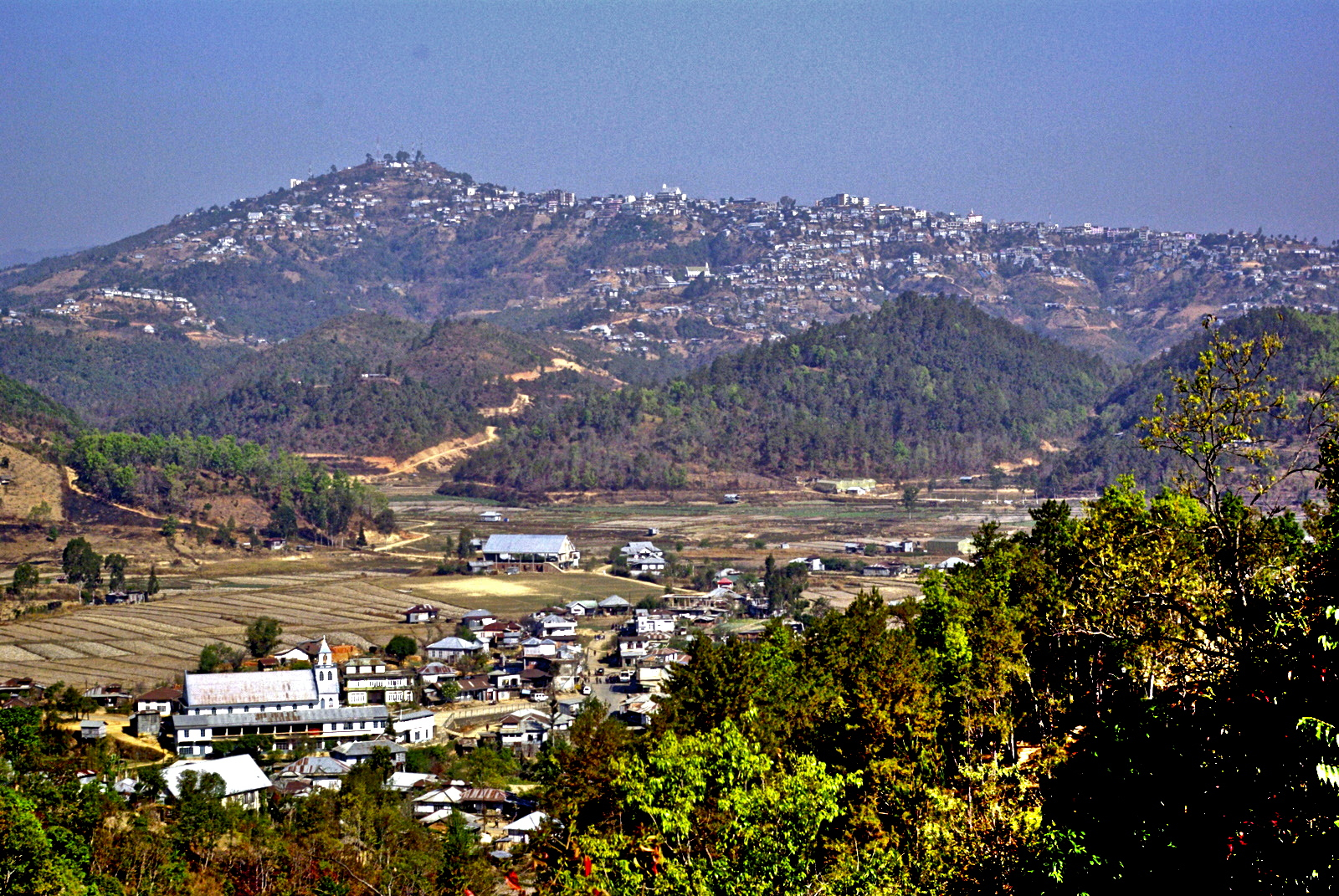
- Champhai, Mizoram, from south, with Zotlang in the foreground. Taken from Ruantlang, across the Champhai Valley, with the town of Champhai stretched along the hill in the distance and the village of Zotlang in the foreground
- Nickname: Rice Bowl of Mizoram
- Location within Mizoram Location within India
- Coordinates: 23.456°N 93.329°E
- Country: India
- State: Mizoram
- District: Champhai

Government
  - Type: District Administration
  - Body: Office of the Deputy Commissioner, Champhai

Area
  - Total: 10 km^{2} (3.9 sq mi)
- Elevation: 1,678 m (5,505 ft)

Population (2023)
  - Total: 44,000
  - Density: 4,400/km^{2} (11,000/sq mi)

Languages
  - Official: Mizo
- Time zone: UTC+5:30 (IST)
- PIN: 796321
- Telephone code: 03831
- Vehicle registration: MZ-04
- Climate: Subtropical highland
- Website: champhai.nic.in

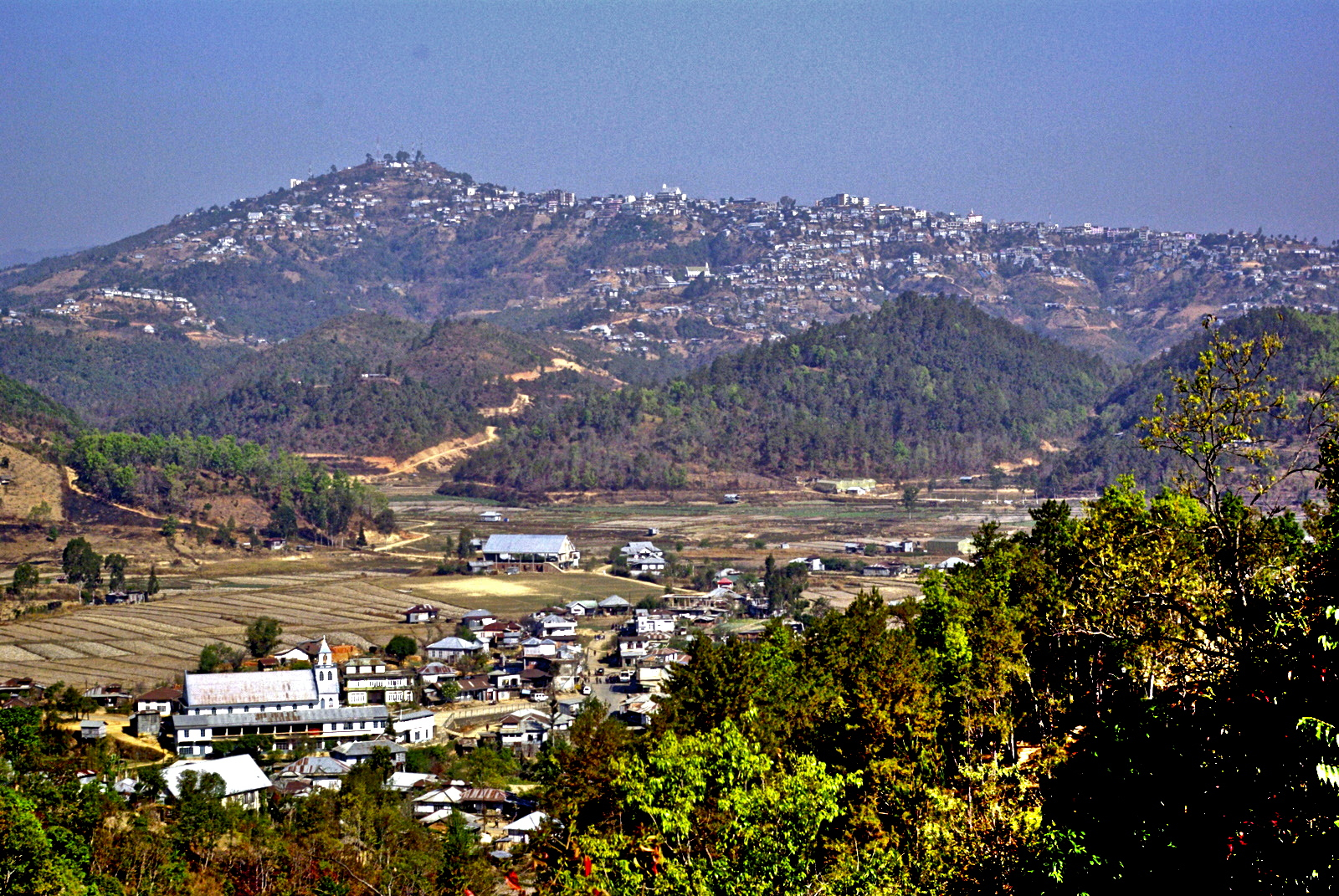
Champhai, Mizoram, from south, with Zotlang in the foreground. Taken from Ruantlang, across the Champhai Valley, with the town of Champhai stretched along the hill in the distance and the village of Zotlang in the foreground.

Champhai is the third largest town in Mizoram, northeast India and is one of the oldest settlements founded by the Mizo people that initially served as a capital for the Hmar dynasty. Located near the India–Myanmar border, it facilitates cross-border trade and serves as a hub for trade and commerce in the region.

Unlike most urban places in Mizoram, Champhai is situated in a valley and on top of a small hill. It is situated at an elevation of approximately 1,678 meters (5,505 feet) above sea level. It had an estimated population of 44,000 in 2023.

== History ==
The Hmar people are credited to be the first settlers of Champhai, until they left the place and the Ralte people came in to later occupy it. Old stone structures, such as the Sikpui Lung (a monolith associated with a particular festival of the Hmar people) can still be found to this day. The inscription on the monolith reads:

HE LUNG HI HMANLAI HMAR HO SIKPUI A NI TIN KEINI KUM 28.12.1918 A HIAN KAN AWM TA. ZAHULA SAILO

Rough Translation:

This is the stone erected by the Hmars in the past to commemorate Sikpui, and we have now occupied this place from 28.2.1918, Zahula Sailo

Champhai was the headquarters of Lalbura Sailo, son of Vanhnuailiana, a Mizo Chief against whom the British Expedition of 1871–72 was directed. It was accorded the status of a fort during the British period. The Champhai Valley was once a lake and was gradually silted to obliterate the lake. The soil of the plain was still uncultivated during the Lushai Expedition of 1872. Irrigated rice cultivation started in Champhai in the year 1898 encouraged by the British Colonial Authorities to supply rice for their soldiers and laborers. As of 1922, there was only 1 shop in Champhai. On 1 March 1966, the Mizo National Front declared independence of Mizos unilaterally and attacked the Assam Rifles post at Champhai.

In March 1988, Champhai hosted the First Zomi Convention, organised by Thenphunga Sailo in conjunction with T. Gougin of the Zomi National Congress in Manipur. The meeting saw the birth of Zo Reunification Organisation (ZORO).

== Governance ==
As with all other districts, general administration of all aspects of polity and economy are headed by the Deputy Commissioner(DC) of the district. All district level Government undertakings including the police are under the purview of the DC. The current (2026) DC of Champhai District is Mohammad Aaquib.

In law enforcement, the DC is assisted largely by the Superintendent of Police (SP) who is the district head of all policing matters in the district. He/she functions closely with the Deputy Commissioner and reports to the DC on all law enforcement related matters of the district. The current (2023) DC of Champhai District is Lalrinpuia Varte, a senior officer of the Mizoram Police Service.

== Economy ==
The economy of Champhai is mainly agriculture and border trade. Champhai is also the main trading centre of Mizoram with goods like clothes, silverware and electronics imported from Myanmar through the trading post in Zokhawthar.

== Media ==
The Major Media in Champhai are:

- Lenrual
- Pasaltha
- Rihlipui
- CCN (Digital TV Operator)
- LCN (Digital TV Operator)

== Transport ==
A helicopter service by Pawan Hans has been started which connects the Aizawl with Champhai. The distance between Champhai and Aizawl is 194 km and is connected with regular service of bus and maxi cab.
