= Khawbung =

Khawbung (/koʊbuːŋ/) is a village in the Champhai district in the Indian state of Mizoram. It is the administrative centre of Khawbung rural development block and Khawbung assembly constituency, which has been renamed as the 25 East Tuipui Constituency.

Khawbung is an administrative block headquarters headed by a Block Development Officer (BDO). There are 25 villages with a total population of 22,139 (11295 males and 10844 females) under the Khawbung RD Block.

== Geography ==
Khawbung
- Sub-Town
- Location in Mizoram, India Khawbung (India)
- Coordinates: 23°10′N 93°14′E
- Country: India
- State: Mizoram
- District: Champhai

Population (2011)
  - Total: 2,097

Languages
  - Official: Mizo
- Time zone: UTC+5:30 (IST)
- PIN: 796321
- Vehicle registration: MZ
- Coastline: 0 kilometres (0 mi)
- Nearest city: Champhai
- Sex ratio: 978 females per 1000 males ♂/♀
- Literacy: 98.12%
- Website: mizoram.nic.in
