= Khawzawl =

- Town
- Location within Mizoram Location within India
- Coordinates: 23.5345°N 93.1830°E
- Country: India
- State: Mizoram
- District: Khawzawl

Government
  - Body: Deputy Commissioner

Area
  - Total: 78 km^{2} (30 sq mi)
- Elevation: 1,187 m (3,894 ft)

Population (2015(reviced)
  - Total: 13,113
  - Rank: 8th
  - Density: 141/km^{2} (370/sq mi)

Languages
  - Official: Mizo
- Time zone: UTC+5:30 (IST)
- Postal code: 796310
- Vehicle registration: MZ-04
- Climate: Cwa
- Website: mizoram.nic.in

Khawzawl is a census town in Khawzawl district in the Indian state of Mizoram.

== Education ==
The main hub for higher education is Khawzawl College.

== Transport ==
Khawzawl is 152 km away from Aizawl. The town can be accessed by regular bus services, sumo (passenger vehicle), and helicopter.

== Media ==
The main newspapers in Khawzawl are the Khawzawl Times and Si-Ar.

== Formation as a district ==
The Government of Mizoram ordered the creation of offices of the Deputy Commissioners of Hnahthial, Saitual, and Khawzawl Districts via a notification dated June 3, 2019, after which the three districts became operational.
