= Champhai district =

- District of Mizoram
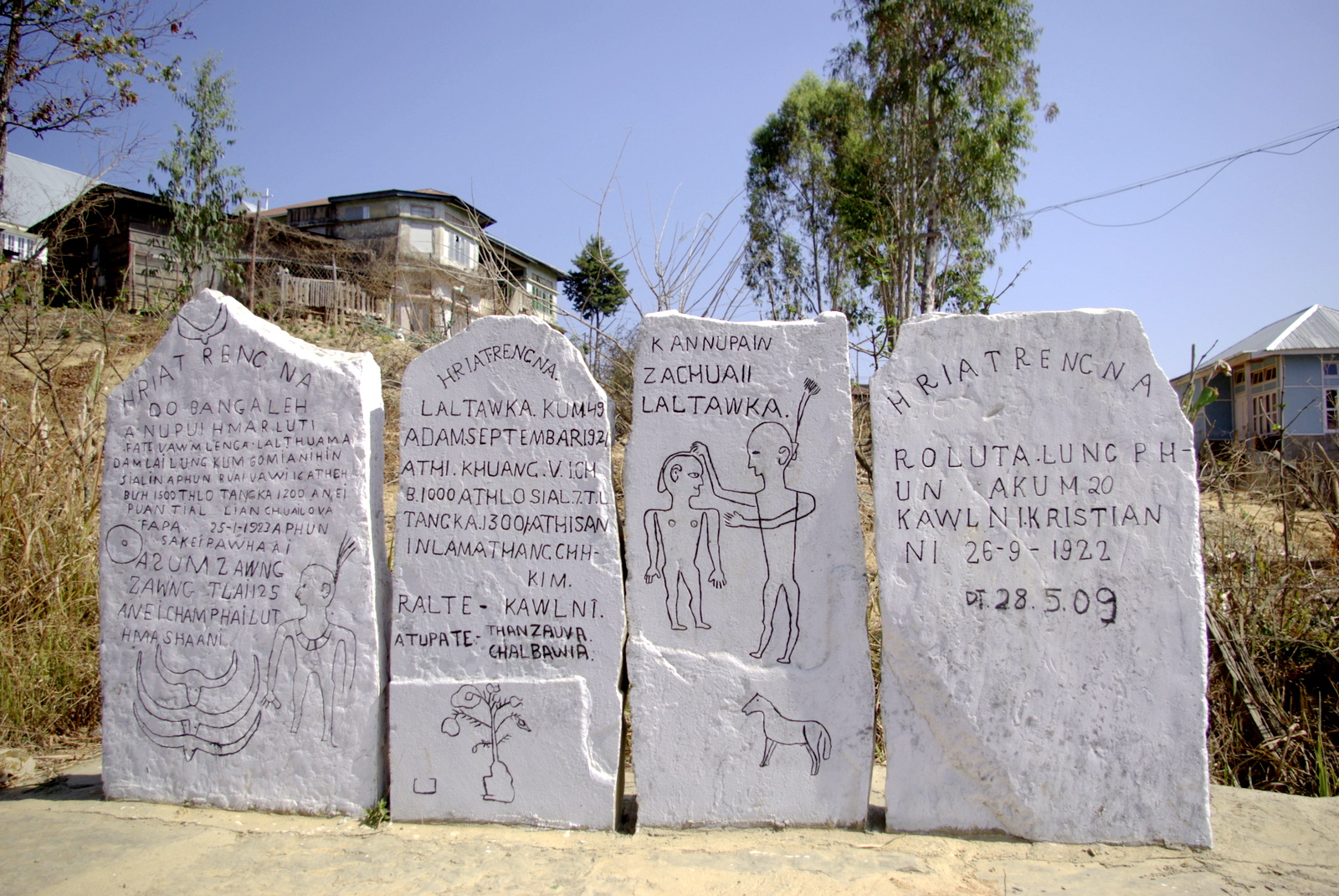
- Standing Stones at Champhai Valley
- Interactive map of Champhai district
- Coordinates: 23.4795°N 93.3288°E
- Country: India
- State: Mizoram
- Headquarters: Champhai

Government
  - Lok Sabha constituencies: Mizoram
  - Vidhan Sabha constituencies: 5

Area
  - District of Mizoram: 3,185.83 km^{2} (1,230.06 sq mi)

Population (2011)
  - District of Mizoram: 125,745
  - Density: 39.4701/km^{2} (102.227/sq mi)
  - Urban: 38.59

Demographics
  - Literacy: 95.91%
  - Sex ratio: 984
- Time zone: UTC+05:30 (IST)
- Website: champhai.nic.in

Champhai district is one of the eleven districts of Mizoram state in India. The district is bounded on the north by Pherzawl district of Manipur state, on the west by Saitual and Serchhip districts, and on the south and east by Myanmar. The district occupies an area of 3,185.83 km^{2} (1,230.06 sq mi). Champhai town is the administrative headquarters of the district.

== Divisions ==
The district is divided into two Rural Development Blocks: Champhai and Khawbung. The district has five Legislative Assembly constituencies. These are Champhai North, East Tuipui, Lengteng, Tuichang, and Champhai South. There are eighty-eight inhabited villages in this district, seventy-six of which are revenue villages.

=== Villages ===
- Neihdawn

== Demographics ==
Historical population
Year	Pop.	±% p.a.
1971	49,139	—
1981	63,729	+2.63%
1991	83,023	+2.68%
2001	107,793	+2.65%
2011	125,745	+1.55%

According to the 2011 census Champhai district has a population of 125,745, roughly equal to the nation of Grenada. This gives it a ranking of 610th in India (out of a total of 640). The district has a population density of 39 inhabitants per square kilometre (100/sq mi). Its population growth rate over the decade 2001–2011 was 16.01%. Champhai has a sex ratio of 984 females for every 1000 males, and a literacy rate of 95.91%.

Religions in Champhai District
Religion	Percent
Christianity	98.17%
Hinduism	0.85%
Islam	0.56%
Others	0.42%

== Flora and fauna ==
In 1991 Champai district became home to Murlen National Park, which has an area of 200 km^{2} (77.2 mi^{2}). It is also home to the Lengteng Wildlife Sanctuary, which was established in 1999 and has an area of 120 km^{2} (46.3 mi^{2}).

== National Monuments ==
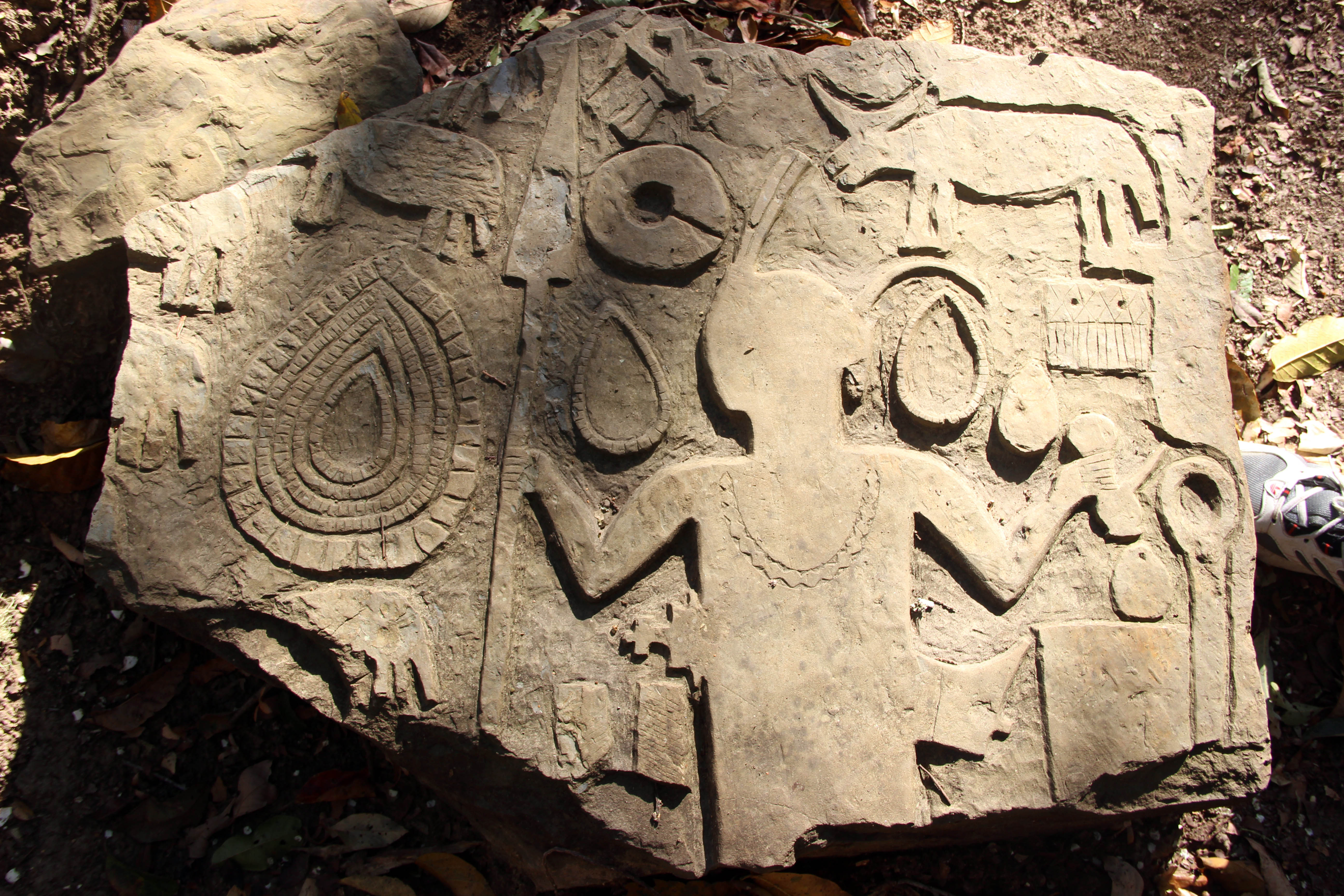
Carvings found at Kawtchhuah Ropui site

The district also has the prehistoric Kawtchhuah Ropui and Lianpui Menhirs which was declared as Monuments of National Importance by Archaeological Survey of India.
