= List of State Protected Monuments in Mizoram =

This is a list of State Protected Monuments as officially reported by and available through the website of the Archaeological Survey of India in the Indian state Mizoram. The monument identifier is a combination of the abbreviation of the subdivision of the list (state, ASI circle) and the numbering as published on the website of the ASI. 53 State Protected Monuments have been recognized by the ASI in Mizoram. Besides the State Protected Monuments, also the Monuments of National Importance in this state might be relevant.

== List of state protected monuments ==
SL. No.	Description	Location	Address	District	Coordinates	Image
S-MZ-1	Sibuta Lung			Aizawl		Upload Photo
S-MZ-2	Rulchawm Kua (Puk)			Aizawl		Upload Photo
S-MZ-3	Paruallung			Aizawl		Upload Photo
S-MZ-4	Kawilam Chhir-kawn			Aizawl		Upload Photo
S-MZ-5	Lungvando			Aizawl		Upload Photo
S-MZ-6	Lung milem			Aizawl		Upload Photo
S-MZ-7	Zawlpala thlan			Aizawl		Upload Photo
S-MZ-8	Tualvungi vawkthleng			Aizawl		Upload Photo
S-MZ-9	Bawrhsap Office			Aizawl		Upload Photo
S-MZ-10	Raj Bhawan			Aizawl		Upload Photo
S-MZ-11	Middle School & Primary School hmasa ber, Sikulpulkawn			Aizawl		Upload Photo
S-MZ-12	Paikhai Bungalow			Aizawl		Upload Photo
S-MZ-13	Vai kulh			Aizawl		Upload Photo
S-MZ-14	Keilami grave			Aizawl		Upload Photo
S-MZ-15	Khuangchera Puk			Aizawl		Upload Photo
S-MZ-16	Hualtungamtawna uino neihna			Aizawl		Upload Photo
S-MZ-17	Lalthangpull Lung			Aizawl		Upload Photo
S-MZ-18	Phingnu & Phingpa			Aizawl		Upload Photo
S-MZ-19	Buizova Zaina Sunhlu Kung			Aizawl		Upload Photo
S-MZ-20	Thlanpial			Aizawl		Upload Photo
S-MZ-21	Lungleng Lal Khamliana Sailo in			Aizawl		Lungleng Lal Khamliana Sailo in
S-MZ-22	Sikpui Lung, Raja Laisanga khua			Aizawl		Upload Photo
S-MZ-23	Mangkhaia Lung			Aizawl		Upload Photo
S-MZ-24	Sikpui Lung			Champhai		Upload Photo
S-MZ-25	Mura Puk			Champhai		Upload Photo
S-MZ-26	Vanhnuailiana Lung			Champhai		Upload Photo
S-MZ-27	Kungawrhi Puk			Champhai		Upload Photo
S-MZ-28	Lamsial Puk			Champhai		Lamsial Puk
S-MZ-29	Dullai Sial			Champhai		Upload Photo
S-MZ-30	Chhura Chi Rawt Lung			Champhai		Upload Photo
S-MZ-31	Lianchhiari Lunglen Tlang			Champhai		Upload Photo
S-MZ-32	Lianchhiari Puantahna			Champhai		Upload Photo
S-MZ-33	Pi Pu Kawtchhuah			Champhai		Upload Photo
S-MZ-34	Kawtchhuah Ropui			Champhai		Kawtchhuah Ropui More images
S-MZ-35	Ralven Puk4			Champhai		Upload Photo
S-MZ-36	Lianpuihmun			Champhai		Upload Photo
S-MZ-37	Thasiama Seno neihna			Champhai		Upload Photo
S-MZ-38	Lungpher Puk			Champhai		Upload Photo
S-MZ-39	Sahlam			Champhai		Sahlam
S-MZ-40	Lungkeiphawtial			Champhai		Upload Photo
S-MZ-41	Tuilut			Kolasib		Upload Photo
S-MZ-42	Lalnu Tialpari Lung			Lawngtlai		Upload Photo
S-MZ-43	Lung leihlawn			Lunglei		Upload Photo
S-MZ-44	Capt. T.H. Lewin Lungphun			Lunglei		Upload Photo
S-MZ-45	Oldham Lungkher			Lunglei		Upload Photo
S-MZ-46	Chawngvungi thlan			Lunglei		Upload Photo
S-MZ-47	Lungphunlian			Mamit		Upload Photo
S-MZ-48	Lungkulh			Mamit		Upload Photo
S-MZ-49	Reng Dil			Mamit		Upload Photo
S-MZ-50	Missionary te in			Siaha		Upload Photo
S-MZ-51	Chhura leh Na-a Vawk			Serchhip		Upload Photo
S-MZ-52	Chhura farep			Serchhip		Upload Photo
S-MZ-53	Lung milem			Serchhip		Upload Photo

== See also ==
- List of State Protected Monuments in India for other State Protected Monuments in India
- List of Monuments of National Importance in Mizoram
