= List of Monuments of National Importance in Mizoram =

This is a list of Monuments of National Importance (ASI) as officially recognized by and available through the website of the Archaeological Survey of India in the Indian state Mizoram. The monument identifier is a combination of the abbreviation of the subdivision of the list (state, ASI circle) and the numbering as published on the website of the ASI. 8 Monuments of National Importance have been recognized by the ASI in Mizoram.

SL. No.	Description	Location	Address	District	Coordinates	Image
N-MZ-1	Menhirs and Caves	Vangchhia		Champhai	23°12′05″N 93°20′30″E	Menhirs and Caves More images

== See also ==
- List of Monuments of National Importance in India for other Monuments of National Importance in India
- List of State Protected Monuments in Mizoram
