= Chhura (disambiguation) =

Chhura may refer to:

- Chhura, a village in Chhattisgarh, India
- Chhurbura, the nickname of a Mizo folklore character
