= Lianpui Menhirs =

Protected megalith site in Mizoram, India

Lungphun Ropui / Lianpui Menhirs
- Lungphun Ropui (Lushai)
- Location in Mizoram, India Lianpui Menhirs (India)
- 23°15′25″N 93°20′59″E
- Type: Megalithic memorial stones
- Periods: Possibly Iron Age
- Cultures: Pre‑Christian Mizo traditions
- Location: Lianpui, Champhai district, Mizoram, India

History
- Built: Probable pre‑Christian era; site notification began 2021

Site notes
- Material: Stone
- Area: approx. site area not specified
- Excavation dates: Inspection & documentation 2021–2025
- Archaeologists: Archaeological Survey of India (ASI)
- Condition: Preserved
- Owner: Government of India
- Management: Archaeological Survey of India
- Public access: Yes

Lianpui Menhirs (also known as Lungphun Ropui) is an archaeological megalithic site near the village of Lianpui in Champhai district, Mizoram, India. It consists of 114 intricately carved menhirs, arranged in ceremonial alignments. It was declared as Mizoram’s second centrally protected Monument of National Importance by the Archaeological Survey of India on 14 July 2025.

== History and declaration ==
The formal process to designate Lungphun Ropui began on 9 February 2021 with a Gazette notification under the Ancient Monuments and Archaeological Sites and Remains Act, 1958, followed by a two-month objection period. ASI Director (Monuments) A.M.V. Subramanyam inspected the site on 7 July 2025, before the final declaration was issued on 14 July 2025.

== Features and significance ==
It contains 114 menhirs, carved with symbols and images including human figures, birds, animals, mithun heads, gongs, lizards, and other motifs. The stones are aligned in eight axes — four running north‑south and four east‑west — suggesting a deliberate ceremonial layout. The largest menhirs measure approximately 1.87 m in height and 1.37 m in width.

The carvings belong to pre‑Christian Mizo iconography, reflecting traditions predating colonial and missionary influences. The alignment and carving patterns indicate a structured ritual or communal symbolism in early Mizo culture. This site complements other similar megalith complexes in Mizoram, including Kawtchhuah Ropui in Vangchhia.

== Tourism and preservation ==
Following the ASI declaration, government plans include developing visitor infrastructure such as fencing, walkways, signage, restrooms, and drinking-water facilities.

== See also ==
- Kawtchhuah Ropui (Vangchhia menhirs – Mizoram’s first ASI site)
- Champhai district
