= Lianpui =

- village
- Location in Mizoram, India Lianpui (India)
- Coordinates: 23.243708°N 93.328453°E
- Country: India
- State: Mizoram
- District: Champhai
- Block: Khawbung
- Elevation: 1,707 m (5,600 ft)

Population (2011)
  - Total: 531
- Time zone: UTC+5:30 (IST)
- 2011 census code: 271363

Lianpui is a village in the Champhai district of Mizoram, India. It is located in the Khawbung R.D. Block. The village also has the prehistoric Lianpui Menhirs, which was declared as a national monument by Archaeological Survey of India in 2025.

== Demographics ==
According to the 2011 census of India, Lianpui has 120 households. The effective literacy rate (i.e. the literacy rate of population excluding children aged 6 and below) is 94.32%.

Demographics (2011 Census)
	Total	Male	Female
Population	531	280	251
Children aged below 6 years	91	44	47
Scheduled caste	0	0	0
Scheduled tribe	525	275	250
Literates	415	230	185
Workers (all)	298	156	142
Main workers (total)	291	151	140
Main workers: Cultivators	6	2	4
Main workers: Agricultural labourers	259	131	128
Main workers: Household industry workers	1	1	0
Main workers: Other	25	17	8
Marginal workers (total)	7	5	2
Marginal workers: Cultivators	1	1	0
Marginal workers: Agricultural labourers	0	0	0
Marginal workers: Household industry workers	3	2	1
Marginal workers: Others	3	2	1
Non-workers	233	124	109
