= Vangchhia =

- village
- Location in Mizoram, India Vangchhia (India)
- Coordinates: 23.2035497°N 93.3332252°E
- Country: India
- State: Mizoram
- District: Champhai
- Block: Khawbung
- Elevation: 1,641 m (5,384 ft)

Population (2011)
  - Total: 837
- Time zone: UTC+5:30 (IST)
- 2011 census code: 271364

Vangchhia is a village in the Champhai district of Mizoram, India. It is located in the Khawbung R.D. Block.

The 171 menhir stones in the village became Mizoram's first protected archaeological site in 2012.

== History ==
Vangchhia is also the home of ancient Kawtchhuah Ropui (literally the great entrance of the village) memorial stones. In most tribal societies of this region, a cluster of memorial stones were traditionally erected in the entrance of settlements in commemoration to their dear ones, braves or outstanding persons who won victories in war or hunting untamed animals. However, the uniqueness of Kawtchhuah Ropui has been seen that all the figures were embossed. It may be assumed that the dressing of Kawtchhuah Ropui stones might be done with fine iron-tools. Findings of potsherds near Kawtchhuah Ropui showed that there were two successions of settlement in this area. The typology of dressing clay-pots confirms this hypothesis. There have been found two types of potsherds, greatly differed from each other in its dressing – the first had irregular threads of dress-finishing and well-baked while the second one bore regular threads resembling the Mizo traditional techniques of dressing clay-pots. These striking features help us confident to conclude that two successions of human settlement must confine to this place.

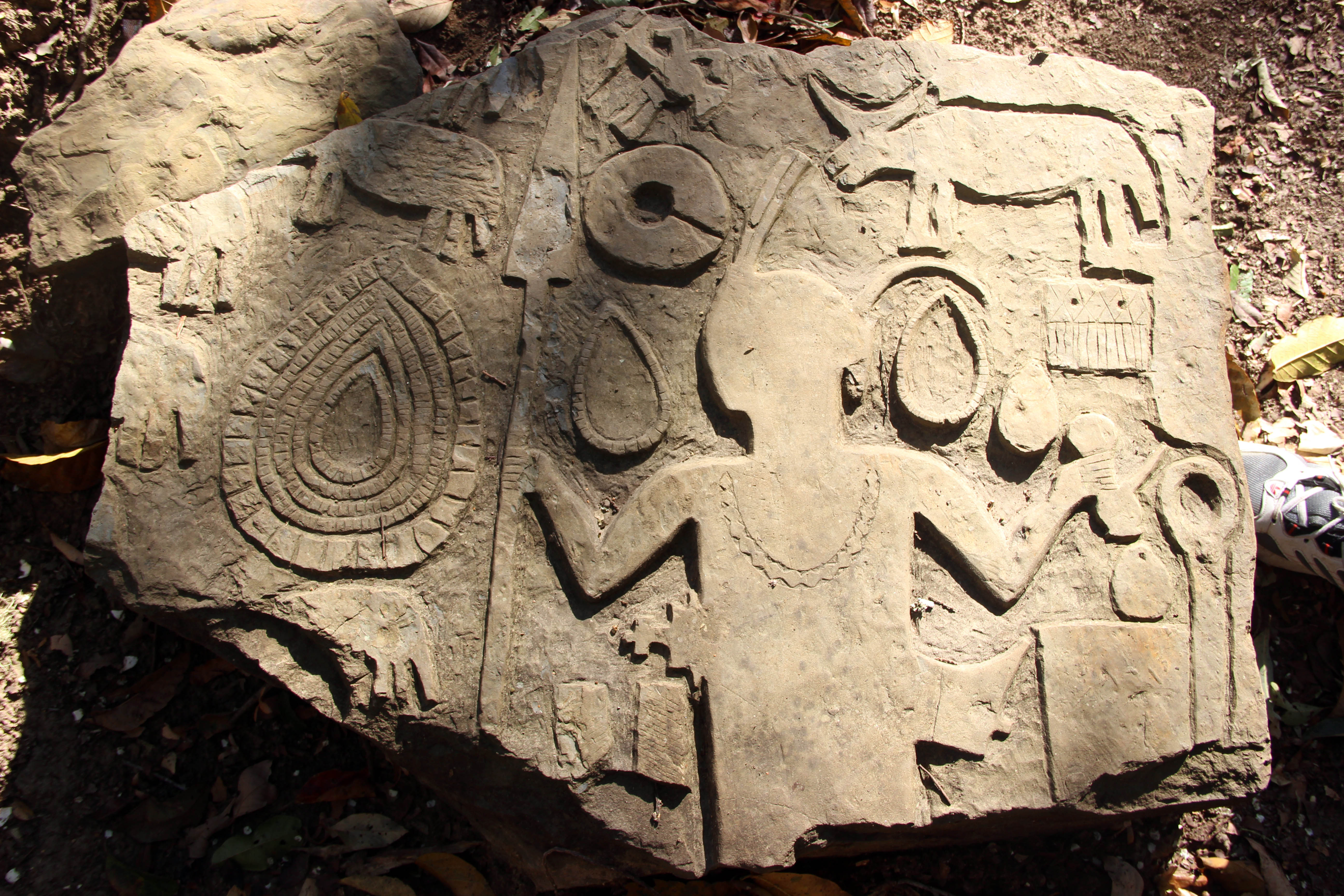
Kawtchhuah Ropui memorial stone at Vangchhia.

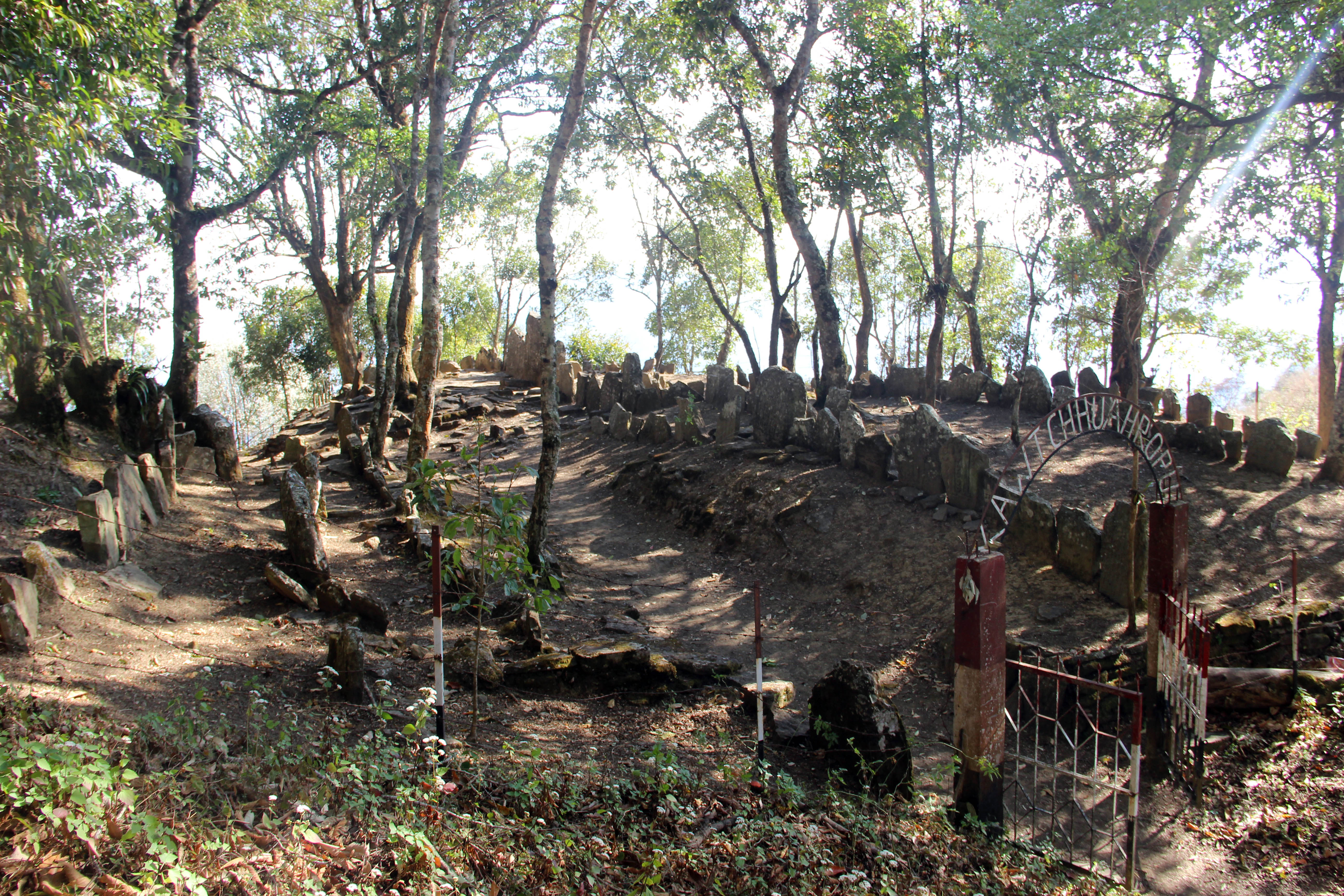
Pre-historic necropolis site at Vangchhia.

== Demographics ==
According to the 2011 census of India, Vangchhia has 153 households. The effective literacy rate (i.e. the literacy rate of population excluding children aged 6 and below) is 96.87%.

Demographics (2011 Census)
	Total	Male	Female
Population	837	424	413
Children aged below 6 years	167	82	85
Scheduled caste	0	0	0
Scheduled tribe	815	413	402
Literates	649	333	316
Workers (all)	354	205	149
Main workers (total)	343	199	144
Main workers: Cultivators	319	182	137
Main workers: Agricultural labourers	0	0	0
Main workers: Household industry workers	0	0	0
Main workers: Other	24	17	7
Marginal workers (total)	11	6	5
Marginal workers: Cultivators	10	5	5
Marginal workers: Agricultural labourers	0	0	0
Marginal workers: Household industry workers	0	0	0
Marginal workers: Others	1	1	0
Non-workers	483	219	264

== Society ==
The Vangchhia tribe is native to this village. Vangchhia is the name of one of the eleven sub-tribes of Mizoram.
