= Chhurbura =

Mizo folklore hero

Chhurbura also known as Chhura is a legend in Mizo folklore. Chhurbura is a recurring character with many stories and variations of his exploits shared across the Mizo people. Many of his stories also involve Nahaia, his older brother.

== Characterization ==
Chhurbura is described in different ways. Some stories describe him as a silly simpleton or a crafty and wise man who carried out foolish acts for his brother Nahaia. In most cases with his interactions with Nahaia, Chhurbura would come out in the more unfortunate position compared to his brother. In stories not involving his brother, Chhurbura is seen as successful and more of a folk hero. Chhura's identity in Mizo folklore is characterized widely from brother, husband, fool, trickster and culture hero. He typically fuses positive and negative traits to reflect the values of precolonial Mizo society. Chhura while often a victim of silly events is argued to represent the Mizo spirit of Tlâwmngaihna (Mizo concept of selfless giving to others). Due to the many characterizations of Chhura it is difficult to categorise him as a literary figure in folklore.

== Stories ==
=== Exchanging a house with Nahaia ===
Nahaia was the older brother and had to move out of his ancestral home after marriage to build a new one. However Nahaia was lazy and built a house of poor quality and leakages. Chhura himself had built a house of good quality in comparison. Nahaia offered to swap houses which Chhurbura initially refused as it was full of holes. Nahaia claimed that Chhurbura would be able to see the stars in the night sky which led to his agreement. Chhurbura enjoyed the starry skies until a heavy rain occurred. As a result he had to build a completely new roof.

=== Exchange of a jhum and a magic horn ===
Chhura and Nahaia both owned their own jhum plots. At the bottom corner of Nahaia's field was a big hollow tree where many birds used to come and rest during intervals of searching for food. Nahaia could not tolerate the birds and would hunt them down by throwing stones or a traditional slingshot known as Sairawkherh. However, one time, the stones hit the hole of the hollow tree where Phungpuinu, a hobgoblin, was using shelter for her young ones. Once Nahaia found the spirit in his jhum field he immediately offered to exchange his for Chhurbura's field. The reason being, the spirit had become angry and threatened to use her powers for revenge. Nahaia was fearful of its chanting curses in an unknown language. He assumed that changing ownership of the field would change the curse of the female spirit and save himself. Chhurbura agreed without question. Nahaia later stated to Chhurbura that if he threw a rock at the tree, then pigeons would fly out, which he could use to cook meat. Chhura threw the stones at the tree where the spirit warned him to stop because it was hurting her children. Chhura did not heed the warnings and continued to throw the stones. Realizing that the new owner had foolhardy courage, the spirit left temporarily. In the absence of the spirit, Chhura reached the hollow tree and found the children of the spirit. Variations of the deaths include the birds being eaten or being fed hot ash.

After the death of her children, the spirit wept and grieved. He waited in his Tlawbuk (jhum house) for the spirit but she would not come out. Chhura thus pretended to leave his house and hid back into it to trick the spirit. The spirit who believed Chhura to be gone entered his Tlawbuk to search for food within it. Chhura sprung on the spirit and captured her. The spirit pleaded for freedom but Chhura demanded a ransom for her freedom. The spirit thus offered Chhura an axe to clear his jhum. Chhura asked if the axe could do the work without human help, which the spirit clarified it could not. She offered Chhura a hoe but refused on the basis that it could not work without human assistance. Finally, the spirit offered the magic horn of a deer (Sekibuhchhuak). From one end of the horn when the owner wished, cooked meat would emerge and cooked rice from the other end. After testing the horn Chhura accepted the offer and released the spirit.

Nahaia learnt of the magical horn and wished to possess it himself. He began a scheme to trick Chhura for the horn. Nahaia informed Chhura that if his house was on fire he should save his most important possession which he hinted was the horn. Nahaia removed the front plank at the entrance and set fire to Chhura's house. Chhura rushed and retrieved the horn. However, the missing plank made him fall, and thus, he released it as he fell. Nahaia picked up the horn and claimed possession of the horn as Chhura had technically thrown it away. Chhura in anger informed Nahaia that if Nahaia's house was on fire he will sound an alarm and that he should retrieve his horn. Nahaia saw through Churra's scheme. When the alarm was sounded, Nahaia retrieved his whetstone and hit it on Churra's shin as he tossed it. Chhura claimed the whetstone as Nahaia had thrown it out despite not needing it.

=== Digging wild potatoes ===
Nahaia was lazy and did not dig deep in the jungle to forage wild potatoes. On the other hand, Chhura worked tirelessly and procured high quality potatoes. While washing the potatoes Nahaia washed up the stream and Chhura below him. Nahaia would continue to pass by Chhura and claim his good potatoes were taken by the current and thus take Chhurbura's best potatoes leaving him with low quality ones. Chhurbura caught on to this trick and refused to forage wild potatoes with him again.

=== Sparing a mithun ===
Chhura and Nahaia had a mithun. Not knowing how to divide the animal the decided to share it. Chhurbura would have the tail end while Nahaia would have the head end. Every morning Nahaia would task Chhurbura with cleaning the dung of the tail end. Growing tired of this Chhurbura took responsibility of the head end. He was then tasked with feeding it instead. When the mithun calved, Nahaia claimed it as it came from his end. Nahaia kept claiming the calves until Chhurbura threatened to take his share and cut off the head at which Nahai acquiesced and shared the calves too.

=== Nahaia's faked death ===
Nahaia once decided to figure out who his well-wishers and true friends were. He lay down on the jhum path pretending to be dead but no one bothered. The passerby simply observed his death and moved on. Chhurbura encountered Nahaia and cried and grieved for the death of Nahaia. He carried Nahaia home on his back. Upon arrival, Nahaia stood up and declared Chhurbura his only well-wisher.

=== Chhurbura's hijinks ===
During his travels, Chhurra arrived at a village in which the villagers did not excrete. When Chhura excreted, the villagers were curious and asked him what he was doing. Chhura replied that when he was a baby, his mother used an iron bar to open his buttocks to let feces pass. The villager then asked Chhura for this to be done to their children. Chhura agreed and instructed the villagers to do it three days after he departed that day. The villagers obeyed, but this led to the death of their children. The frenzied villagers pursued him. Chhura, realizing this, hid in a hollow log. The villager pursuing him sat on the log and stated in anger that if the log was Chhura's body, they would hack it into pieces without mercy.

Chhura, being frightened, yelled from the log to not cut him up. The villagers dragged him out and took him back to their homes. Chhura claimed that he was inconveniencing them and they should hold him by the elbow to ease their journey. As the villagers complied Chhura broke free and escaped. Chhura climbed a big banyan tree as the villagers stood under him around it. After becoming tired of waiting, the villager began to fell the tree. Chhura yelled at them to stop and that he would climb down or else he would be killed. The villagers continued to finish felling the tree after he reached the ground which Chhurra took as another escape opportunity. Chhura was finally captured and kept in a big basked where he was bound with ropes. The basket was hung underneath a bridge over a large turbulent river.

While Chhura began to lament his fate a Pawi man crossed the bridge. Chhura threatened the man to release him or he would be killed. The traveler obliged. Chhura then offered him to enter the basket which he agreed. However Chhura bound him and trapped him inside it. As the Pawi was a merchant who was wealthy, Chhura took his goods and returned to the villagers who despised him. The villagers, surprised at his predicament, asked how he survived and received so much wealth. Chhura claimed that he tied a cooking pot to his waist and dived into the river where he found treasure and collected the best goods. He advised the village men to visit the river bed to become wealthy like him. The men followed his advice and perished into the river. The wives of the men enquired of their husband's fate in which Chhura claimed that the wealth was too heavy for them to bring back. As the wives left, Chhura extinguished all of the fires of their houses. When the wives returned lamenting their husband's death, Chhura offered them fuel to light their fires further enriching himself.

=== Chhura lost the art of whistling ===
One day Chhura went to a village he had never visited. During his visit he heard a man whistling a tune. Captivated and impressed by it, Chhura approached the man and asked how much he would charge for the art of whistling. Listening to the offer, the man thought to teach him for the price of three gongs.

Chhura learnt the tune and began to whistle it constantly so he would not forget the tune. When he was on his journey home he passed through a muddy spot and fell down. As he tumbled he stopped whistling. After recovering from his fall he realized he had lost his tune of whistling. Hoping to recover it, Chhura began to retrace his steps to found it. During his search a Pawi traveller discovered him and asked him what he had lost. Chhura did not heed the man and inform him of the matter. However, the Pawi continued to help and began to look around for anything Chhura could have lost. After a long search, the Pawi became tired and sat down. He whistled to himself to ease his mind. This reminded Chhura of the tune.

According to variations, Chhura heard the Pawi whistling and demanded why he had stolen his tune. He pulled out the Pawi's tongue as a result.

=== Chhura and the beautiful fly ===
Once upon a time, Chhura was said to have caught a beautiful fly in the countryside. Observing the beauty of the fly, Chhura planned to sell it to become rich. Chhura journeyed to Mawngping village to sell the fly for the maximum price it could fetch. At the market he called out that he possessed the most beautiful fly that ever lived and further yelled if anybody would like to purchase it. The villagers who were intrigued requested to see the fly before giving Chhura any payment. Chhura reiterated that if the fly flew away then the villagers would have to pay. The villagers continued their demand and Chhura opened his fist. The colorful fly flew away instantly as it was freed. The villagers were awed by the spectacle. Chhura seeing the escape of the fly demanded his payment. The villagers kept their word and held a feast for Chhura.

=== The flying horse ===
A story narrates Chhura's death along with Nahaia's. The story purports the existence of a white flying horse hidden in the mountains. Chhura and Nahaia heard about the horse and they were hoping to catch and tame it. They searched the mountain and reached the summit where they found the horse. They approached the horse silently but it became startled at one point and immediately began to fly. Chhura grabbed the leg of the horse as Nahaia grabbed Chhura's waist. Chhura asked Nahaia to change his position but Nahaia protested it as being impossible. Since Chhura did not believe Nahaia, who had frequently tricked him, he then asked him to catch the other leg of the horse. This continued until Chhura became annoyed and had no alternative but to let go of the horse. Finally both brothers fell from midair through the trees onto a big stone and died.

=== Chhurbura's death ===
There are variations of Chhura's death. One version claims Chhura died as a chief. Another version claims he died during his travels. The story of the flying horse is accounted as one of the possible deaths of Chhura and his brother. Most endings agree that Churra was a rich and powerful man by the time he died. The most popular ending is that Chhura took part in a game called Nghengtawl-ah. This was a special day long festival played by the villagers. Chhura was said to be so absorbed into the game that he did not eat or drink, and thus perished out of fatigue and exhaustion.

== Sources ==
- Khiangte, Laltluanga (2001). "Chhura: Undisputed Hero of Mizo Folk Tales". Indian Literature. 45 (1): 84–91. JSTOR 23343218.
- Lalbiakthanga (1978). The Mizos: A Study in Racial Personality. Guahati: United Publishers.
- Lalthangliana, B (2005). Culture and folklore of Mizoram. Publications Division Ministry of Information & Broadcasting. ISBN 978-81-230-2658-9.
- Khiangte, Laltluanga (2006). "The Discourse in Oral Society of the Mizos". In Muthukumaraswamy, M.D. (ed.). Folklore as Discourse. Chennai: National Folklore Support Centre. ISBN 978-81-901481-6-0.
