= Kawtchhuah Ropui =

Protected archaeological site in Mizoram, India

- Kawtchhuah Ropui (Lushai)
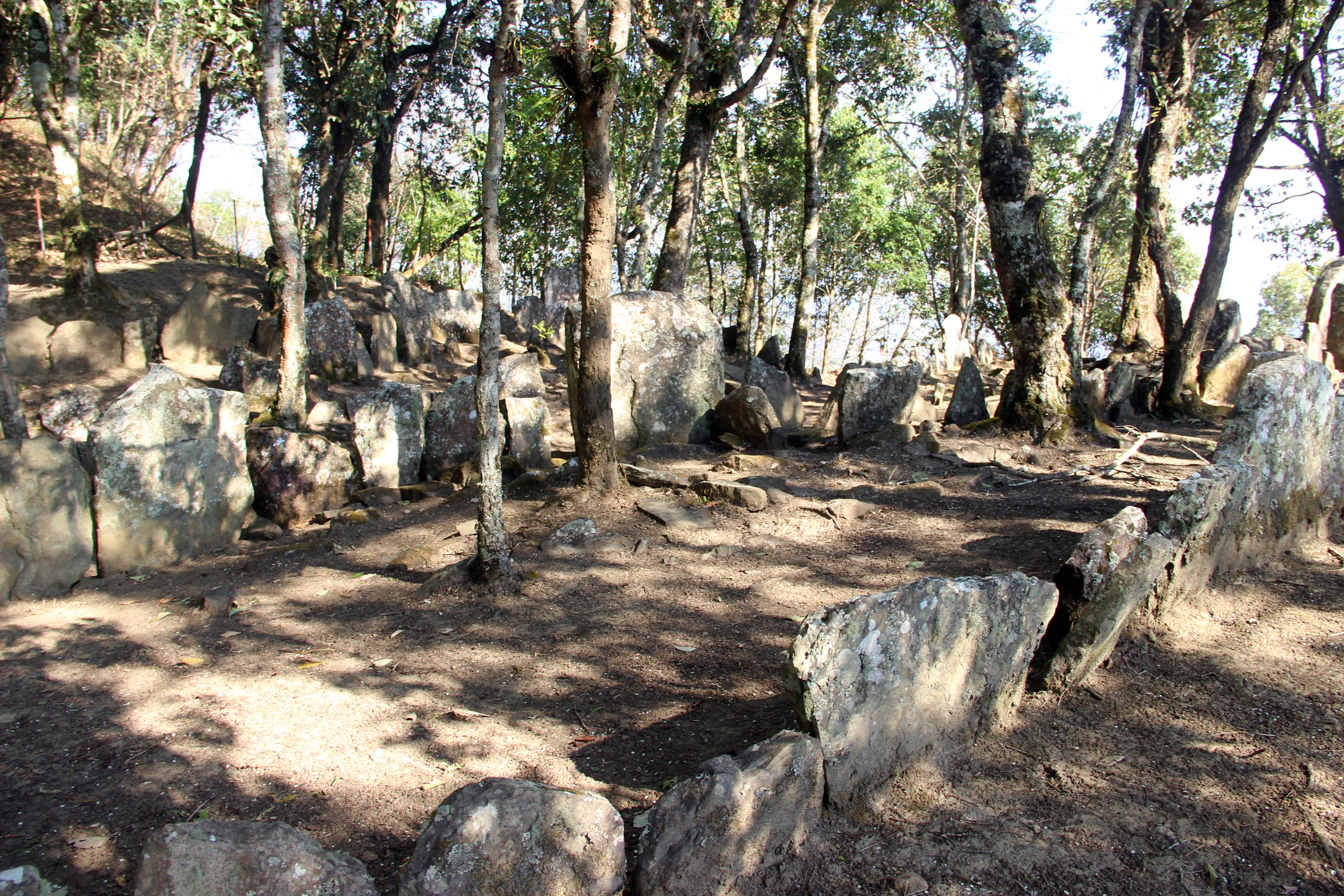
- Kawtchhuah Ropui Menhirs

- Location in Mizoram, India Kawtchhuah Ropui (India)
- 23.2967°N 93.3776°E
- Type: Megalithic site
- Periods: Iron Age, possibly Neolithic
- Cultures: Mizo
- Location: Vangchhia, Champhai district, Mizoram, India

History
- Built: Estimated 14th–15th century CE or earlier
- Abandoned: Unknown

Site notes
- Material: Sandstone
- Area: approx. 45 km²
- Excavation dates: 2016–2019
- Archaeologists: Archaeological Survey of India
- Condition: Preserved
- Owner: Government of India
- Management: Archaeological Survey of India
- Public access: Yes

Kawtchhuah Ropui (literally The Great Entranceway in the Mizo language) is an archaeological heritage site located near Vangchhia village in Champhai district, Mizoram, India. It comprises around 170 menhirs (standing stones) engraved with human and animal figures, floral motifs, and weapons. In 2012, the site was declared Mizoram’s first centrally protected monument by the Archaeological Survey of India (ASI).

== History and designation ==
In 2011, the ASI conducted a survey and confirmed the significance of the Vangchhia site. It was subsequently notified as a site of national importance under the Ancient Monuments and Archaeological Sites and Remains Act, 1958.

== Significance ==
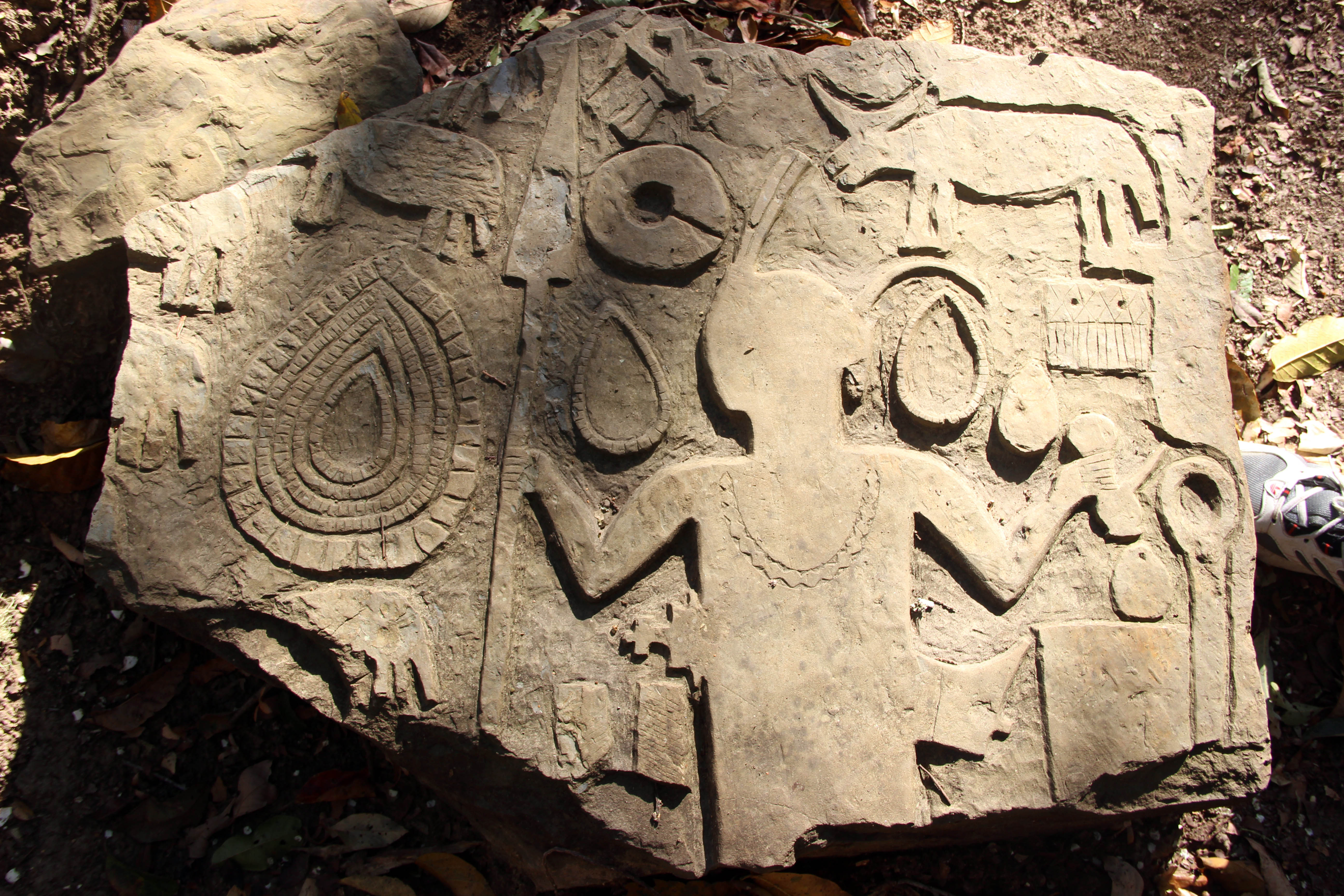

The site contained over 170 engraved menhirs aligned along a pathway at the entrance to the village. Some of these menhirs are up to 15 feet tall, featuring engraved images of humans, animals, ceremonial items, traditional Mizo hunting practices, images of Mizo musical instruments and heroes from the community’s legends. A necropolis, retaining walls, and a "water pavilion"—a structure with drilled holes, likely for water storage were also found.

Initial ASI assessments dated the site to the 14th–15th century CE. However, excavated pottery and the presence of nearby Neolithic caves suggest that the area may have been occupied much earlier.

In Mizo tradition, large stone monuments—known as lungdawh—were erected to commemorate individuals of importance. The scale and detail of Kawtchhuah Ropui make it one of the most elaborate of such sites, possibly serving as a ceremonial or communal space.

== Tourism and preservation ==
The Government of Mizoram allocated ₹5.2 crore for infrastructure development, including pathways, rest areas, and interpretation boards.

== Gallery ==
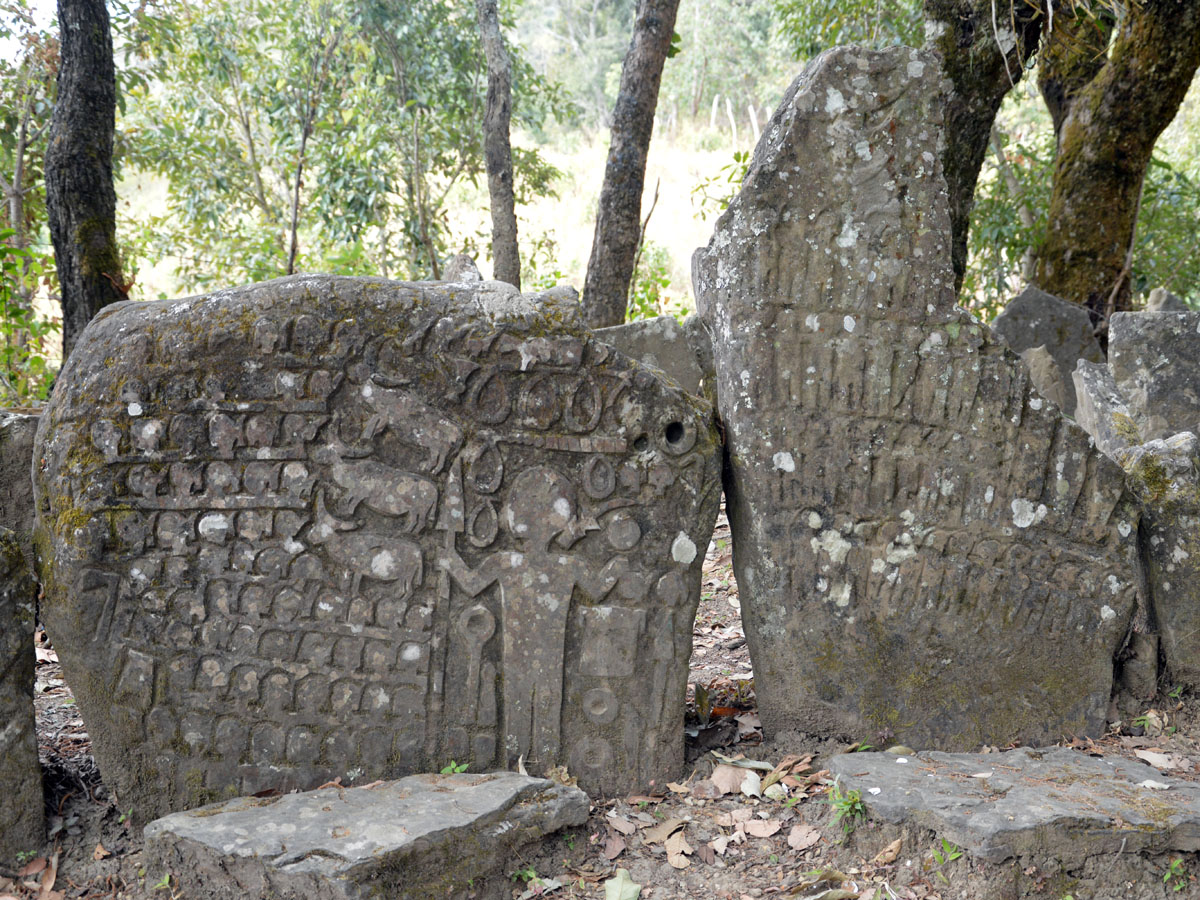

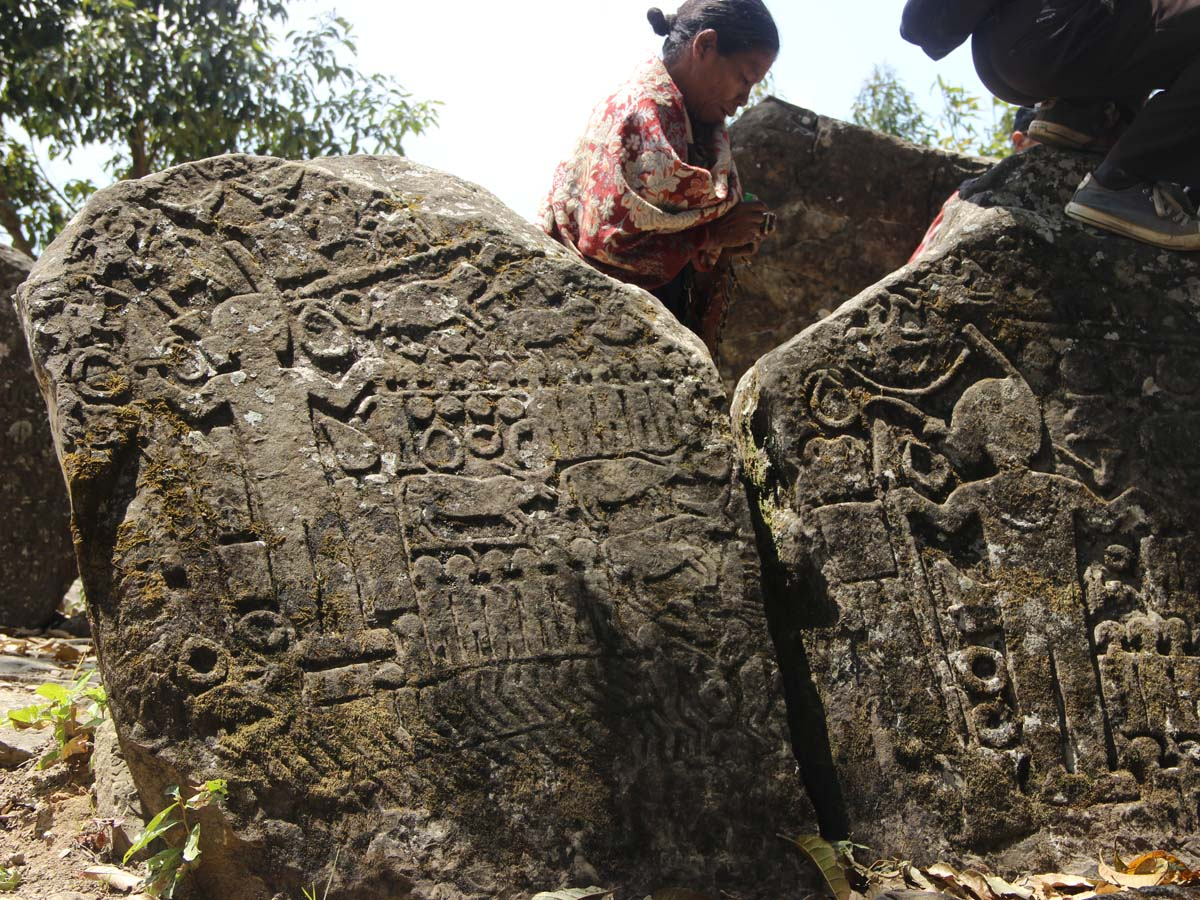

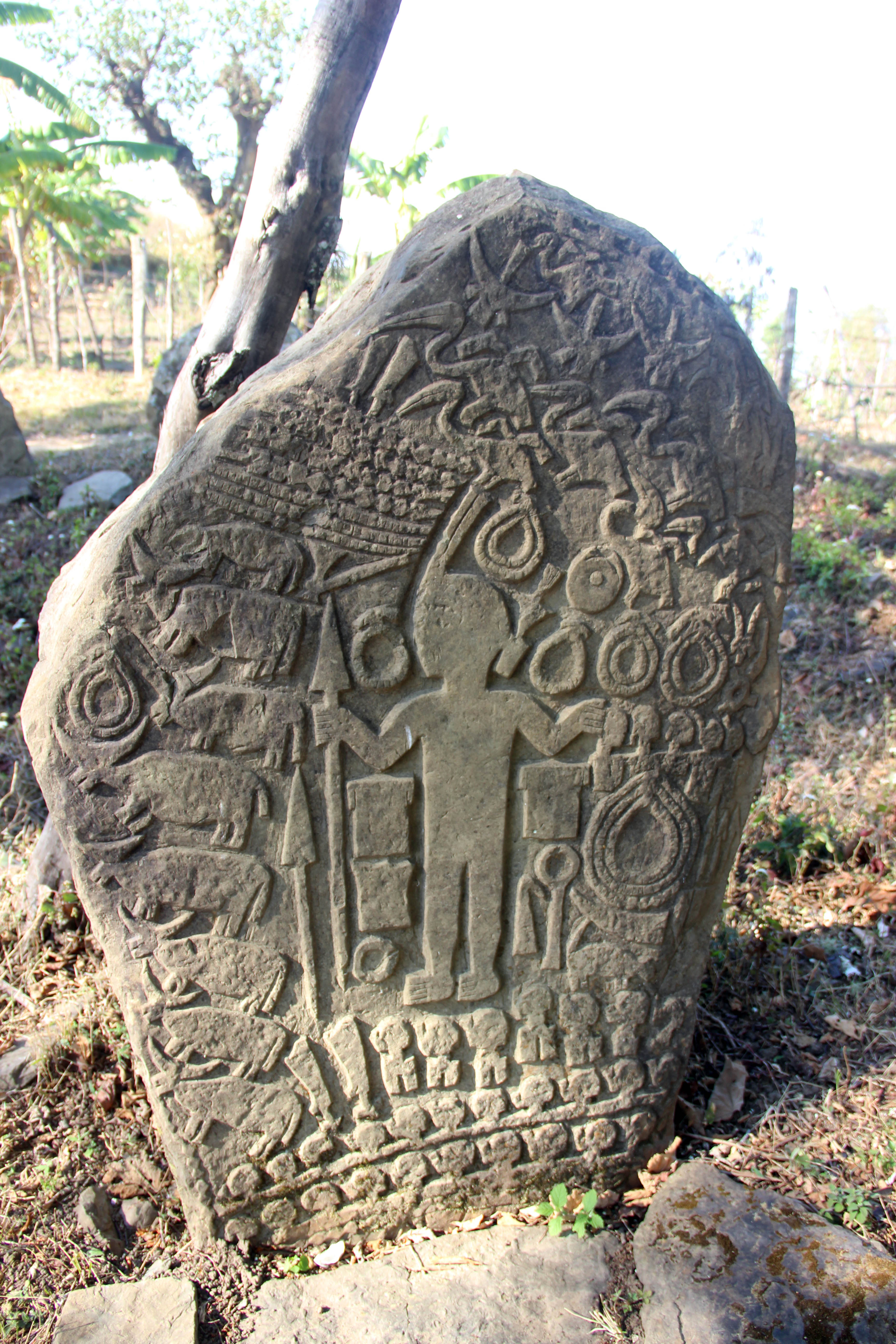

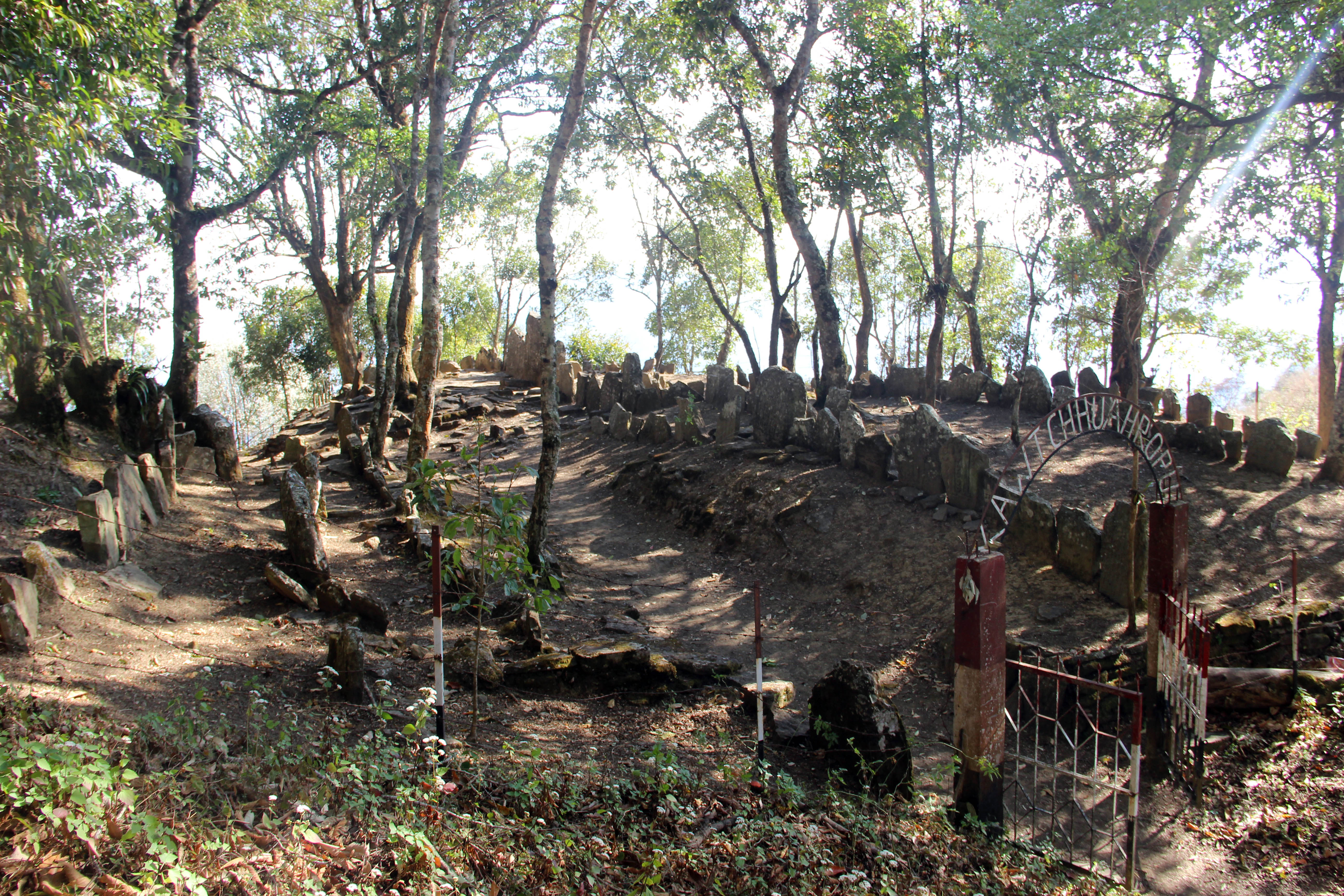

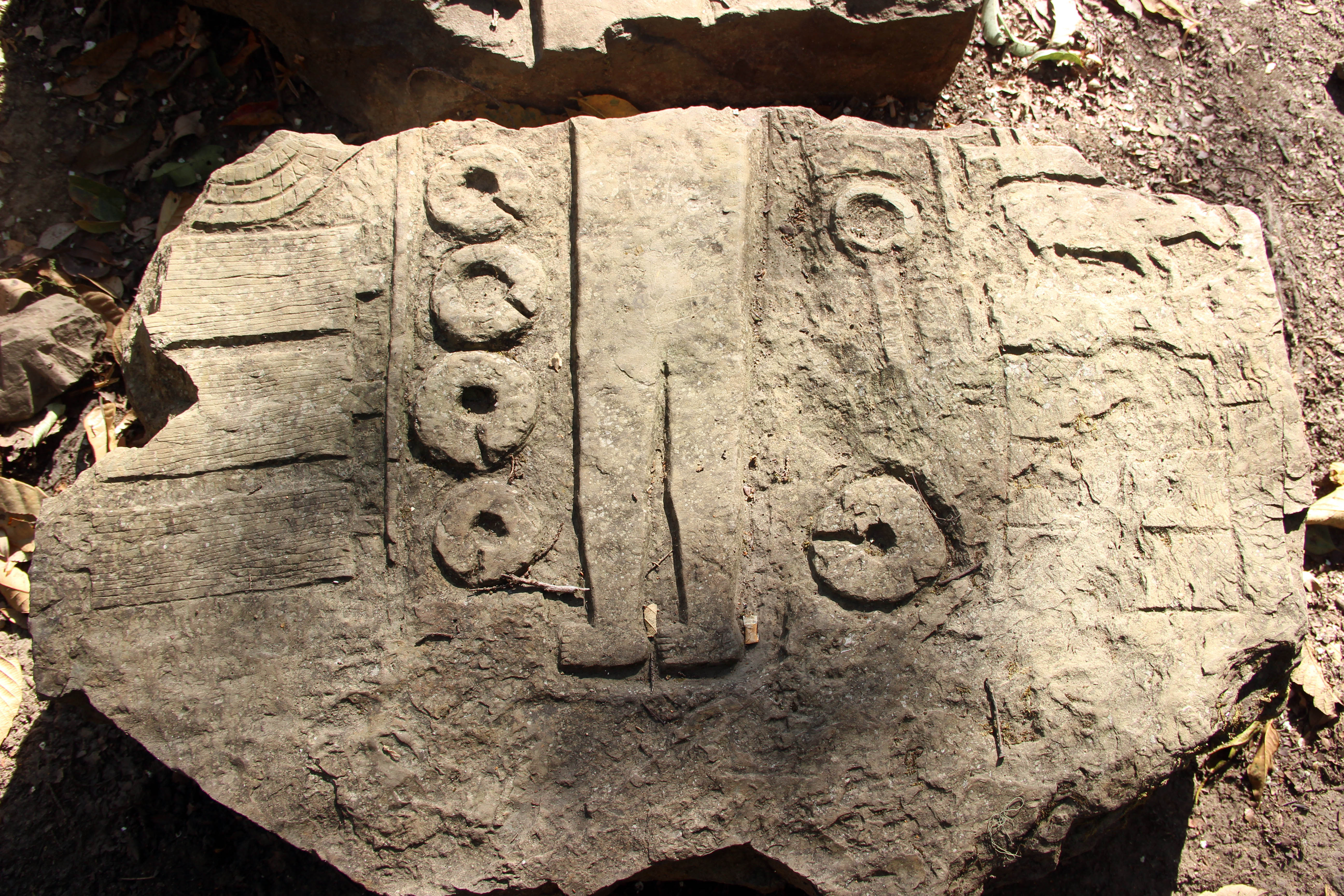

== See also ==
- Vangchhia
- Lianpui Menhirs
- Archaeology in India
