= List of urban local bodies in Uttar Pradesh =

The following is a list of the urban local bodies in the Indian state of Uttar Pradesh.

1. Nagar Nigam - 17
2. Nagar Palika Parishad - 200
3. Nagar Panchayat - 544

== List of Municipal Corporations (Nagar Nigams) in Uttar Pradesh ==
There are currently 17 Municipal Corporations in Uttar Pradesh with 1360 wards. Shahjahanpur Nagar Nigam is the youngest Municipal Corporation in the state.

No.	City	District	Corporation Name	Voters (2017)	Year of Formation	No. of Wards	Last Election	Mayor	Party
1	Agra	Agra	Agra Municipal Corporation	1,267,581	1994	100	2023	Hemalata Diwakar	Bharatiya Janata Party
2	Aligarh	Aligarh	Aligarh Municipal Corporation	612,237	1997	70	2023	Prashant Singhal	Bharatiya Janata Party
3	Ayodhya	Ayodhya	Ayodhya Municipal Corporation	198,905	1994	60	2023	Girishpati Tripathi	Bharatiya Janata Party
4	Bareilly	Bareilly	Bareilly Municipal Corporation	761,889	1994	80	2023	Umesh Gautam	Bharatiya Janata Party
5	Firozabad	Firozabad	Firozabad Municipal Corporation	503,518	2014	70	2023	Surendra Singh Rathore	Bharatiya Janata Party
6	Ghaziabad	Ghaziabad	Ghaziabad Municipal Corporation	1,359,145	1994	100	2023	Sunita Dayal	Bharatiya Janata Party
7	Gorakhpur	Gorakhpur	Gorakhpur Municipal Corporation	865,302	1994	80	2023	Dr. Manglesh Srivastava	Bharatiya Janata Party
8	Jhansi	Jhansi	Jhansi Municipal Corporation	418,545	2002	60	2023	Biharilal Verma	Bharatiya Janata Party
9	Kanpur	Kanpur Nagar	Kanpur Municipal Corporation	2,135,072	1959	110	2023	Pramila Pandey	Bharatiya Janata Party
10	Lucknow	Lucknow	Lucknow Municipal Corporation	2,327,920	1959	110	2023	Sushma Kharkwal	Bharatiya Janata Party
11	Meerut	Meerut	Meerut Municipal Corporation	1,123,015	1994	90	2023	Harikant Ahluwalia	Bharatiya Janata Party
12	Moradabad	Moradabad	Moradabad Municipal Corporation	623,160	1994	70	2023	Vinod Agrawal	Bharatiya Janata Party
13	Prayagraj	Prayagraj	Prayagraj Municipal Corporation	1,074,588	1994	80	2023	Ganesh Kesarwani	Bharatiya Janata Party
14	Saharanpur	Saharanpur	Saharanpur Municipal Corporation	540,724	2009	70	2023	Dr. Ajay Kumar	Bharatiya Janata Party
15	Shahjahanpur	Shahjahanpur	Shahjahanpur Municipal Corporation	246,079	2018	60	2023	Archana Verma	Bharatiya Janata Party
16	Varanasi	Varanasi	Varanasi Municipal Corporation	1,085,300	1982	90	2023	Ashok Tiwari	Bharatiya Janata Party
17	Mathura -Vrindavan	Mathura	Mathura-Vrindavan Municipal Corporation	620,339	2017	70	2023	Vinod Sharma	Bharatiya Janata Party

== List of Nagar Palika Parishads (Municipalities) in Uttar Pradesh ==
There are 200 Nagar Palika Parishads (NPP) in Uttar Pradesh.

No.	City	District	Voters (2017)	No. of Wards	Ruling Party
1	Achhnera	Agra	19,252	25	RLD
2	Afzalgarh	Bijnor	22,975	25	IND
3	Ahraura	Mirzapur	18,810	25	BJP
4	Akbarpur	Ambedkar Nagar	83,655	25	IND
5	Aliganj	Etah	23,696	25	BJP
6	Amroha	Amroha	1,44,363	34	BJP
7	Anupshahr	Bulandshahr	23,001	25	IND
8	Aonla	Bareilly	46,501	25	SP
9	Atarra	Banda	33,559	25	BJP
10	Atrauli	Aligarh	44,672	25	SP
11	Auraiya	Auraiya	64,369	25	SP
12	Awagarh	Etah	23,458	25	BJP
12	Azamgarh	Azamgarh	86,861	25	SP
13	Bachhraon	Amroha	22,607	25	SP
14	Baghpat	Bagpat	37,100	25	RLD
15	Bah	Agra	14,239	25	IND
16	Baheri	Bareilly	52,690	25	BJP
17	Bahjoi	Sambhal	29,336	25	BJP
18	Bahraich	Bahraich	1,61,700	34	BJP
19	Ballia	Ballia	89,144	25	BJP
20	Balrampur	Balrampur	63,957	25	BJP
21	Banda	Banda	1,24,409	31	BJP
22	Bangarmau	Unnao	30,540	25	IND
23	Bansi	Siddharthanagar	31,800	25	SP
24	Baraut	Bagpat	81,812	25	RLD
25	Barua Sagar	Jhansi	19,495	25	BJP
26	Basti	Basti	1,07,583	25	SP
27	Bela Pratapgarh	Pratapgarh	57,916	25	BJP
28	Bhadohi	Bhadohi	75,787	28	BSP
29	Bharthana	Etawah	39,061	25	SP
30	Bharwari	Kaushambi	Newly formed	25	BJP
31	Bhinga	Shravasti	31,810	25	BSP
32	Bijnor	Bijnor	71,394	32	BJP
33	Bilari	Moradabad	34,694	25	SP
34	Bilariaganj	Azamgarh	Newly formed	25	SP
35	Bilaspur	Rampur	34,053	25	BJP
36	Bilgram	Hardoi	22,268	25	BJP
37	Bilhaur	Kanpur Nagar	15,838	25	IND
38	Bilsi	Budaun	16,820	25	BJP
39	Bindki	Fatehpur	28,874	25	BJP
40	Bisalpur	Pilibhit	59,781	25	BJP
41	Bisauli	Budaun	24,265	25	IND
42	Biswan	Sitapur	45,865	25	IND
43	Budaun	Budaun	1,30,118	29	IND
44	Bulandshahr	Bulandshahr	1,60,237	37	BJP
45	Chandausi	Sambhal	93,582	25	IND
46	Chandpur	Bijnor	62,864	25	INC
47	Charkhari	Mahoba	20,353	25	SP
48	Chhibramau	Kannauj	49,168	25	BJP
49	Chirgaon	Jhansi	12,841	25	BJP
50	Chitrakoot Dham Karwi	Chitrakoot	45,175	25	BJP
51	Chunar	Mirzapur	30,481	25	INC
52	Colonelganj	Gonda	21,341	25	BJP
53	Dadri	Gautam Buddha Nagar	80,294	25	BJP
54	Dataganj	Budaun	21,083	25	BJP
55	Deoband	Saharanpur	75,335	25	BJP
56	Deoria	Deoria	1,12,238	33	BJP
57	Dhampur	Bijnor	39,061	25	RLD
58	Dhanaura	Amroha	23,965	25	BSP
59	Dibai	Bulandshahr	32,099	25	BJP
60	Etah	Etah	1,05,843	25	BJP
61	Etawah	Etawah	1,99,185	40	SP
62	Etmadpur	Agra	18,561	25	SP
63	Faridpur	Bareilly	60,240	25	SP
64	Farrukhabad	Farrukhabad	2,11,578	42	BSP
65	Fatehpur	Fatehpur	1,60,335	34	SP
66	Fatehpur Sikri	Agra	26,674	25	BSP
67	Gajraula	Amroha	42,902	28	BSP
68	Gangaghat	Unnao	1,07,792	28	IND
69	Gangoh	Saharanpur	48,461	25	BSP
70	Ganj Dundawara	Kasganj	37,086	25	SP
71	Garhmukteshwar	Hapur	36,648	25	BJP
72	Gaura Barhaj	Deoria	26,531	25	BSP
73	Gauriganj	Amethi	21,705	25	BJP
74	Ghatampur	Kanpur Nagar	32,174	25	AIMIM
75	Ghazipur	Ghazipur	88,894	25	BJP
76	Gola Gokarannath	Lakhimpur Kheri	51,959	25	BJP
77	Gonda	Gonda	94,716	27	SP
78	Gopiganj	Bhadohi	25,338	25	IND
79	Gulaothi	Bulandshahr	38,018	25	BJP
80	Gursahaiganj	Kannauj	33,829	25	BJP
81	Gursarai	Jhansi	21,299	25	BJP
82	Haldaur	Bijnor	15,470	25	IND
83	Hamirpur	Hamirpur	37,447	25	BJP
84	Hapur	Hapur	2,02,010	41	BSP
85	Hardoi	Hardoi	1,00,536	26	BJP
86	Hasanpur	Amroha	50,895	28	BJP
87	Hata	Kushinagar	76,319	25	SP
88	Hathras	Hathras	1,06,698	35	BJP
89	Jahangirabad	Bulandshahr	44,567	25	BJP
90	Jais	Amethi	21,359	25	INC
91	Jalalabad	Shahjahanpur	28,831	25	SP
92	Jalalpur	Ambedkar Nagar	24,073	25	SP
93	Jalaun	Jalaun	44,685	25	BJP
94	Jalesar	Etah	28,994	25	IND
95	Jaswantnagar	Etawah	25,136	25	SP
96	Jaunpur	Jaunpur	1,90,294	39	BJP
97	Jhinjhak	Kanpur Dehat	19,357	25	BJP
98	Kaimganj	Farrukhabad	26,550	25	IND
99	Kairana	Shamli	65,094	25	IND
100	Kakrala	Budaun	26,771	25	IND
101	Kalpi	Jalaun	42,259	25	IND
102	Kandhla	Shamli	32,218	25	SP
103	Kannauj	Kannauj	60,169	25	BSP
104	Kasganj	Kasganj	79,051	25	BJP
105	Khair	Aligarh	28,571	25	AAP
106	Khairabad	Sitapur	37,903	25	BJP
107	Khalilabad	Sant Kabir Nagar	34,248	25	IND
108	Khatauli	Muzaffarnagar	54,164	25	RLD
109	Khekada	Bagpat	32,349	25	BJP
110	Khoda-Makanpur	Ghaziabad	1,55,880	34	IND
111	Khurja	Bulandshahr	80,170	31	BJP
112	Kiratpur	Bijnor	46,872	25	SP
113	Konch	Jalaun	43,134	25	BJP
114	Kosi Kalan	Mathura	44,159	25	BJP
115	Kushinagar	Kushinagar	98,671	27	BJP
116	Laharpur	Sitapur	49,666	25	IND
117	Lakhimpur	Lakhimpur Kheri	1,38,482	30	IND
118	Lalitpur	Lalitpur	1,17,421	26	BJP
119	Loni	Ghaziabad	4,09,183	55	RLD
120	Maharajganj	Maharajganj	26,816	25	SP
121	Mahmoodabad	Sitapur	38,126	25	SP
122	Mahoba	Mahoba	65,855	25	BJP
123	Mainpuri	Mainpuri	1,40,451	32	BJP
124	Mallawan	Hardoi	27,433	25	IND
125	Manjhanpur	Kaushambi	Newly formed	25	BJP
126	Marhara	Etah	15,868	25	SP
127	Mau	Mau	2,18,629	45	BSP
128	Maudaha	Hamirpur	37,515	25	BSP
129	Mauranipur	Jhansi	47,185	25	IND
130	Mawana	Meerut	65,448	25	BJP
131	Milak	Rampur	22,992	25	BJP
132	Mirzapur	Mirzapur	1,90,341	38	BJP
133	Misrikh Neemsar	Sitapur	14,771	25	IND
134	Modinagar	Ghaziabad	1,11,078	34	BJP
135	Mohammadabad	Ghazipur	29,211	25	SP
136	Mohammadi	Lakhimpur Kheri	33,741	25	BJP
137	Mubarakpur	Azamgarh	70,778	25	IND
138	Mungra Badshahpur	Jaunpur	13,965	25	BJP
139	Muradnagar	Ghaziabad	73,334	25	BSP
140	Muzaffarnagar	Muzaffarnagar	2,59,927	55	BJP
141	Nagina	Bijnor	57,858	25	IND
142	Najibabad	Bijnor	69,322	25	IND
143	Nakur	Saharanpur	18,025	25	BJP
144	Nanpara	Bahraich	38,271	25	IND
145	Nautanwa	Maharajganj	25,644	25	IND
146	Nawabganj	Bareilly	29,620	25	BJP
147	Nawabganj	Gonda	13,328	25	IND
148	Nawabganj	Barabanki	1,46,577	29	SP
149	Nehtaur	Bijnor	38,238	25	RLD
150	Noorpur	Bijnor	32,850	25	BJP
151	Orai	Jalaun	1,41,849	34	BSP
152	Padrauna	Kushinagar	39,327	25	BJP
153	Paliya Kalan	Lakhimpur Kheri	33,856	25	BJP
154	Pihani	Hardoi	26,908	25	SP
155	Pilibhit	Pilibhit	99,958	27	BJP
156	Pilkhuwa	Hapur	68,013	25	BJP
157	Powayan	Shahjahanpur	21,868	25	BJP
158	Pt. Deen Dayal Upadhyaya Nagar	Chandauli	75,754	25	IND
159	Pukhrayan	Kanpur Dehat	17,419	25	BJP
160	Puranpur	Pilibhit	30,225	25	BJP
161	Raebareli	Raebareli	1,63,924	34	INC
162	Rampur	Rampur	2,56,160	43	AAP
163	Rasara	Ballia	25,150	25	BSP
164	Rath	Hamirpur	50,998	25	BJP
165	Robertsganj	Sonbhadra	34,151	25	BJP
166	Rudauli	Ayodhya	33,038	25	SP
167	Sahaswan	Budaun	50,386	25	IND
168	Sambhal	Sambhal	1,72,070	37	AIMIM
169	Samthar	Jhansi	16,968	25	BJP
170	Sandi	Hardoi	19,571	25	BSP
171	Sandila	Hardoi	49,355	25	SP
172	Sardhana	Meerut	48,599	25	SP
173	Sarsawa	Saharanpur	15,046	25	IND
174	Seohara	Bijnor	35,681	25	AAP
175	Shahabad	Hardoi	60,190	25	SP
176	Shahganj	Jaunpur	21,047	25	SP
177	Shamli	Shamli	91,580	28	BJP
178	Shamsabad	Agra	23,757	25	IND
179	Sherkot	Bijnor	47,355	25	IND
180	Shikarpur	Bulandshahr	29,291	25	BJP
181	Shikohabad	Firozabad	90,762	25	BJP
182	Siddharthanagar	Siddharthanagar	22,967	25	BJP
183	Sikandra Rao	Hathras	35,733	25	AIMIM
184	Sikandrabad	Bulandshahr	77,583	25	BJP
185	Sirsaganj	Firozabad	26,448	25	BJP
186	Siswa Bazar	Maharajganj	Newly formed	25	TBD
187	Sitapur	Sitapur	1,46,104	30	BJP
188	Soron	Kasganj	21,632	25	BJP
189	Suar	Rampur	26,033	25	AD(S)
190	Sultanpur	Sultanpur	80,079	25	BJP
191	Syana	Bulandshahr	37,605	25	IND
192	Tanda	Rampur	33,463	25	IND
193	Tanda	Ambedkar Nagar	70,052	25	IND
194	Thakurdwara	Moradabad	33,948	25	IND
195	Tilhar	Shahjahanpur	45,192	25	SP
196	Tundla	Firozabad	44,227	25	IND
197	Ujhani	Budaun	45,866	25	BJP
198	Unnao	Unnao	1,22,013	32	BJP
199	Utraula	Balrampur	25,880	25	BJP
200	Zamania	Ghazipur	25,767	25	BJP

== List of Nagar Panchayats in Uttar Pradesh ==
As of 2023, there are 544 Nagar Panchayats in Uttar Pradesh.

City	District	Voters (2017)	No. of Wards	Ruling Party
Achalganj	Unnao	Newly Formed		
Achhalda	Auraiya	7,082	10	
Adari	Mau	10,438	11	
Agwanpur	Moradabad	20,129	15	
Ailam	Shamli	10,667	12	IND
Ait	Jalaun	Newly Formed		
Ajhuwa	Kaushambi	11,845	12	
Akbarpur	Kanpur Dehat	32,874	19	
Alapur	Budaun	18,052	15	
Allahganj	Shahjahanpur	10,721	11	
Amanpur	Kasganj	8,304	10	
Ambehata Peer	Saharanpur	12,215	12	INC
Amethi	Amethi	11,032	12	
Amethi	Lucknow	11,147	11	
Amila	Mau	4,170	10	
Aminagar Sarai	Baghpat	7,465	11	
Amraudha	Kanpur Dehat	7,474	10	
Anand Nagar	Maharajganj	8,074	11	
Anpara	Sonbhadra	Newly Formed		
Antu	Pratapgarh	6,132	10	
Ashrafpur Kichhauchha	Ambedkar Nagar	19,590	17	
Asothar	Fatehpur	Newly Formed		
Atasu	Auraiya	8,191	11	
Atraulia	Azamgarh	6,746	11	
Aurangabad	Bulandshahr	20,906	15	
Auras	Unnao	4,607	10	
Azmatgarh	Azamgarh	8,256	11	
Babarpur Ajitmal	Auraiya	20,454	15	
Baberu	Banda	10,425	12	
Babhnan Bazar	Basti	11,226	11	
Babrala	Sambhal	14,840	12	
Babugarh	Hapur	4,270	10	
Bachhrawan	Raebareli	9,605	11	
Bada Gaon	Jhansi	7,107	10	
Badlapur	Jaunpur	14,377	15	
Baghnagar	Sant Kabir Nagar	Newly Formed		
Bahadurganj	Ghazipur	14,027	13	
Bahsuma	Meerut	9,941	11	
Bahuwa	Fatehpur	8,885	10	IND
Bairia	Ballia	21,819	16	
Baitalpur	Deoria	Newly Formed		
Bajna	Mathura	6,530	10	
Bakewar	Etawah	10,853	12	
Bakshi Ka Talab	Lucknow	45,702	19	
Baldev	Mathura	9,717	10	
Banat	Shamli	14,088	14	BJP
Banda	Shahjahanpur	Newly Formed		
Bankati	Basti	16,791	15	
Banki	Barabanki	18,863	13	
Bansdih	Ballia	17,802	15	
Bansgaon	Gorakhpur	14,229	12	
Banthra	Lucknow	Newly Formed		
Barauli	Aligarh	Newly Formed		
Bardar	Lakhimpur Kheri	10,398	11	
Barhalganj	Gorakhpur	16,391	14	
Barhani Bazar	Siddharthanagar	11,063	11	
Barhni Chafa	Siddharthanagar	Newly Formed		
Barhapur	Bijnor	18,046	15	
Bariyarpur	Deoria	12,005	13	
Barkhera	Pilibhit	10,358	10	
Barnahal	Mainpuri	Newly Formed		
Barsana	Mathura	8,535	10	
Behat	Saharanpur	15,294	13	IND
Belahra	Barabanki	13,557	15	
Belhar Kalan	Sant Kabir Nagar	Newly Formed		
Belsar	Gonda	Newly Formed		
Belthara Road	Ballia	16,235	13	
Beniganj	Hardoi	7,843	10	
Beswan	Aligarh	4,636	10	
Bewar	Mainpuri	17,359	15	
Bhagwant Nagar	Unnao	4,619	10	
Bhaluani	Deoria	Newly Formed		
Bhanpur	Basti	Newly Formed		
Bharat Bhari	Siddharthanagar	Newly Formed		
Bharatganj	Prayagraj	14,932	13	
Bharatkund Bhadarsa	Ayodhya	9,418	11	
Bhargain	Kasganj	19,174	14	
Bhatni	Deoria	11,886	12	
Bhatpar Rani	Deoria	11,497	12	
Bhawan Bahadur Nagar	Bulandshahr	7,854	10	
Bhira	Lakhimpur Kheri	Newly Formed		
Bhogaon	Mainpuri	24,563	16	
Bhojpur Dharampur	Moradabad	23,572	15	
Bhokarhedi	Muzaffarnagar	14,141	13	SP
Bidhuna	Auraiya	22,146	15	
Bighapur	Unnao	4,708	10	
Bikapur	Ayodhya	10,637	11	
Bilaspur	Gautam Budh Nagar	7,558	10	
Bilram	Kasganj	9,734	11	
Bilsanda	Pilibhit	13,121	12	
Bisanda	Banda	8,931	11	
Bisharatganj	Bareilly	12,387	12	
Biskohar	Siddharthanagar	Newly Formed		
Bithoor	Kanpur Nagar	8,550	10	
Brijmanganj	Maharajganj	Newly Formed		
Budhana	Muzaffarnagar	28,651	17	BJP
Budhanpur	Azamgarh	Newly Formed		
Bugrasi	Bulandshahr	11,711	12	
Campierganj	Gorakhpur	Newly Formed		
Chail	Kaushambi	7,307	10	IND
Chakia	Chandauli	11,797	12	
Chandauli	Chandauli	17,040	15	
Chandaus	Aligarh	Newly Formed		
Charthawal	Muzaffarnagar	16,845	14	IND
Charwa	Kaushambi	Newly Formed		
Chaumuhan	Mathura	10,908	10	
Chhaprauli	Baghpat	15,508	14	
Chharra	Aligarh	18,323	15	
Chhata	Mathura	19,125	15	
Chhatari	Bulandshahr	8,173	11	
Chhitauni	Kushinagar	Newly Formed		
Chhutmalpur	Saharanpur	Newly Formed		
Chilkana Sultanpur	Saharanpur	13,719	13	BSP
Chiraiyakot	Mau	16,526	15	
Chitbara Gaon	Ballia	17,244	15	
Chopan	Sonbhadra	11,909	11	
Chowk	Maharajganj	Newly Formed		
Churk Ghurma	Sonbhadra	5,493	10	
Dadhiyal	Rampur	Newly Formed		
Dahgawan	Budaun	Newly Formed		
Dala Bazar	Sonbhadra	Newly Formed		
Dalmau	Raebareli	7,287	10	
Dankaur	Gautam Budh Nagar	10,665	11	
Daraganj alias Karadham	Kaushambi	Newly Formed		
Dariyabad	Barabanki	14,268	13	
Dasna	Ghaziabad	28,581	15	
Daurala	Meerut	15,827	14	
Dayalbagh	Agra	2,416	10	
Deoranian	Bareilly	15,850	13	
Derapur	Kanpur Dehat	5,735	10	
Dewa	Barabanki	12,285	12	
Dhakia	Moradabad	15,217	15	
Dhakwa	Pratapgarh	Newly Formed		
Dhanepur	Gonda	Newly Formed		
Dharamsinghwa	Sant Kabir Nagar	Newly Formed		
Dhaura Tanda	Bareilly	17,098	15	
Dhaurahra	Lakhimpur Kheri	18,572	14	
Dibiyapur	Auraiya	18,904	15	
Dildarnagar	Ghazipur	9,949	11	
Doghat	Baghpat	11,999	12	
Dohrighat	Mau	8,770	11	
Domariaganj	Siddharthanagar	24,252	17	
Dostpur	Sultanpur	10,197	11	
Dudahi	Kushinagar	Newly Formed		
Duddhi	Sonbhadra	9,643	11	
Eka	Firozabad	18,640	15	
Ekdil	Etawah	8,934	10	
Erich	Jhansi	7,235	10	
Faizganj	Budaun	8,901	11	
Farah	Mathura	7,773	10	
Faridnagar	Ghaziabad	9,564	11	
Faridpur	Bareilly	5,891	10	
Fariha	Firozabad	5,607	10	
Fatehabad	Agra	19,448	14	
Fatehganj Pashchimi	Bareilly	20,798	15	
Fatehganj Purvi	Bareilly	9,560	10	
Fatehpur	Barabanki	30,272	16	
Fatehpur Chaurasi	Unnao	4,530	10	
Fazilnagar	Kushinagar	Newly Formed		
Gabhana	Aligarh	Newly Formed		
Gainsari	Balrampur	Newly Formed		
Ganeshpur	Basti	Newly Formed		
Gangapur	Varanasi	5,948	10	
Ganj Muradabad	Unnao	7,605	10	
Garautha	Jhansi	8,297	10	
Garhi Pukhta	Shamli	9,842	11	IND
Garwara Bazar	Pratapgarh	Newly Formed		
Gaurabadshahpur	Jaunpur	Newly Formed		
Gauri Bazar	Deoria	7,399	11	
Gawan	Sambhal	7,793	10	
Gayghat	Basti	Newly Formed		
Ghaghsara Bazar	Gorakhpur	Newly Formed		
Ghiraur	Mainpuri	10,242	11	
Ghorawal	Sonbhadra	5,649	10	
Ghosi	Mau	31,042	18	
Ghosia	Bhadohi	16,205	13	
Ghughali	Maharajganj	8,152	11	
Gohand	Hamirpur	5,482	10	
Gokul	Mathura	3,514	10	
Gola Bazar	Gorakhpur	10,331	11	
Gopamau	Hardoi	10,819	12	
Gosainganj	Lucknow	7,798	10	
Goshainganj	Ayodhya	10,055	12	
Govardhan	Mathura	21,261	14	
Gularia Bhindara	Pilibhit	4,144	10	
Gulariya	Budaun	4,353	10	
Gunnaur	Sambhal	18,992	14	
Gyanpur	Bhadohi	10,079	11	
Haidergarh	Barabanki	14,490	12	
Hainsar Bazar Dhanghata	Sant Kabir Nagar	Newly Formed		
Handia	Prayagraj	18,334	13	
Harduaganj	Aligarh	11,421	11	
Hargaon	Sitapur	17,226	14	
Hariharpur	Sant Kabir Nagar	7,979	10	
Harra	Meerut	12,445	15	
Harraiya	Basti	6,943	10	
Hasayan	Hathras	4,610	10	
Hastinapur	Meerut	21,983	15	
Hathgaon	Fatehpur	8,567	13	IND
Hetimpur	Deoria	Newly Formed		
Hirapur Bazar	Pratapgarh	Newly Formed		
Hyderabad	Unnao	5,487	10	
Iglas	Aligarh	11,595	11	
Ikauna	Shravasti	11,163	12	
Iltifatganj	Ambedkar Nagar	9,655	11	
Islamnagar	Budaun	22,728	16	
Itaunja	Lucknow	5,542	10	
Itwa	Siddharthanagar	Newly Formed		
Jafarabad	Jaunpur	8,577	10	
Jagner	Agra	9,499	10	
Jahanabad	Pilibhit	10,982	11	
Jahanaganj Bazar	Azamgarh	Newly Formed		
Jahangirganj	Ambedkar Nagar	Newly Formed		
Jahangirpur	Gautam Budh Nagar	8,487	10	
Jaithara	Etah	9,300	11	
Jalalabad	Bijnor	15,635	13	
Jalalabad	Shamli	20,392	15	BSP
Jalali	Aligarh	15,421	13	
Jangipur	Ghazipur	10,080	11	
Jansath	Muzaffarnagar	15,724	14	BJP
Jarwal	Bahraich	13,622	13	
Jasrana	Firozabad	9,711	11	
Jattari	Aligarh	13,201	13	
Jawan Sikandarpur	Aligarh	Newly Formed		
Jewar	Gautam Budh Nagar	24,517	16	
Jhalu	Bijnor	16,083	14	
Jhinjhana	Shamli	14,437	14	IND
Jhusi	Prayagraj	17,716	17	
Jiyanpur	Azamgarh	7,679	11	
Joya	Amroha	13,894	12	
Jyoti Khuria	Mainpuri	4,274	10	
Kabrai	Mahoba	18,853	15	
Kachhauna Patseni	Hardoi	11,613	12	
Kachhla	Budaun	6,707	10	
Kachhwa	Mirzapur	12,411	12	
Kadaura	Jalaun	11,565	12	
Kadipur	Sultanpur	5,845	10	
Kaiserganj	Bahraich	Newly Formed		
Kajgaon	Jaunpur	Newly Formed		
Kakod	Bulandshahr	7,431	10	
Kakori	Lucknow	15,959	13	
Kalan	Shahjahanpur	Newly Formed		
Kalinagar	Pilibhit	7,862	10	
Kamalganj	Farrukhabad	10,828	12	
Kampil	Farrukhabad	7,921	10	
Kanchausi	Kanpur Dehat	Newly Formed		
Kant	Shahjahanpur	21,847	15	
Kanth	Moradabad	24,538	17	
Kapilvastu	Siddharthanagar	Newly Formed		
Kaptanganj	Basti	Newly Formed		
Kaptanganj	Kushinagar	17,535	17	
Karari	Kaushambi	12,374	12	
Karhal	Mainpuri	21,719	15	
Karnawal	Meerut	9,603	12	
Karikan Dhata	Fatehpur	Newly Formed		
Kasba Sangrampur Unwal	Gorakhpur	15,993	14	
Katghar Lalganj	Azamgarh	10,127	11	
Kathera	Jhansi	5,882	10	
Katra	Gonda	5,643	10	
Katra	Shahjahanpur	26,076	16	
Katra Gulab Singh	Pratapgarh	Newly Formed		
Katra Medniganj	Pratapgarh	6,175	10	
Kauriaganj	Aligarh	9,879	11	
Kemri	Rampur	21,032	15	
Kerakat	Jaunpur	11,239	11	
Khadda	Kushinagar	12,572	12	
Khaga	Fatehpur	29,047	18	BJP
Khakhreru	Fatehpur	Newly Formed		
Khamaria	Bhadohi	18,467	15	
Khanpur	Bulandshahr	13,339	12	
Kharela	Mahoba	10,356	12	
Khargupur	Gonda	7,419	10	
Kharkhauda	Meerut	10,867	12	
Kheragarh	Agra	17,393	14	
Kheri	Lakhimpur Kheri	27,651	16	
Kheta Sarai	Jaunpur	15,078	13	
Khimseypur	Farrukhabad	Newly Formed		
Khirauni Suchittaganj	Ayodhya	Newly Formed		
Khiwai	Meerut	15,410	15	
Khudaganj	Shahjahanpur	12,503	11	
Khutar	Shahjahanpur	13,549	12	
Kishni	Mainpuri	8,678	10	
Kishunpur	Fatehpur	5,548	10	IND
Kithaur	Meerut	20,191	15	
Koeripur	Sultanpur	6,515	10	
Kohdaur	Pratapgarh	Newly Formed		
Kopaganj	Mau	24,245	17	
Kora Jahanabad	Fatehpur	20,318	15	BSP
Koraon	Prayagraj	10,958	11	
Kotra	Jalaun	6,559	10	
Kulpahar	Mahoba	15,683	13	
Kumarganj	Ayodhya	Newly Formed		
Kunda	Pratapgarh	20,356	15	
Kundarki	Moradabad	23,690	15	
Kunwargaon	Budaun	5,974	10	
Kuraoli	Agra	19,005	14	
Kuraoli	Mainpuri	18,643	15	
Kurara	Hamirpur	10,353	11	
Kursath	Hardoi	4,392	10	
Kursath	Unnao	4,633	10	
Kurthi Jafarpur	Mau	Newly Formed		
Kusmara	Mainpuri	8,620	10	
Lakhna	Etawah	7,819	11	
Lal Gopalganj	Prayagraj	23,828	15	
Lalganj	Pratapgarh	15,885	16	
Lalganj	Raebareli	19,283	15	
Lambhua	Sultanpur	Newly Formed		
Lar	Deoria	23,533	16	
Lawar	Meerut	17,820	14	
Maa Kamakhya	Ayodhya	Newly Formed		
Machhlishahr	Jaunpur	19,941	15	
Madanpur	Deoria	Newly Formed		
Madhoganj	Hardoi	8,232	10	
Madhogarh	Jalaun	10,500	11	
Madhuban	Mau	16,903	15	
Madrak	Aligarh	Newly Formed		
Maghar	Sant Kabir Nagar	13,234	13	
Mahaban	Mathura	7,769	10	
Maharajganj	Azamgarh	5,293	10	
Maharajganj	Raebareli	5,082	10	
Maholi	Sitapur	17,621	14	
Mahona	Lucknow	5,983	10	
Mahroni	Lalitpur	12,186	10	
Mahul	Azamgarh	7,573	11	
Mailani	Lakhimpur Kheri	10,861	12	
Majhauli Raj	Deoria	15,776	13	
Makkhanpur	Firozabad	Newly Formed		
Malihabad	Lucknow	15,094	13	
Mandawar	Bijnor	17,435	14	
Manikpur	Chitrakoot	13,348	12	
Manikpur	Pratapgarh	10,908	12	
Maniyar	Ballia	16,393	14	
Mankapur	Gonda	6,641	10	
Mariyahu	Jaunpur	17,873	15	
Martinganj	Azamgarh	Newly Formed		
Maswasi	Rampur	13,442	13	
Mataundh	Banda	6,715	10	
Mathauli	Kushinagar	Newly Formed		
Mau	Chitrakoot	Newly Formed		
Mau Aima	Prayagraj	14,550	14	
Maurawan	Unnao	11,030	12	
Mehmoodpur Maafi	Moradabad	Newly Formed		
Mehnagar	Azamgarh	10,856	12	
Mendu	Hathras	10,694	11	
Menhdawal	Sant Kabir Nagar	20,592	15	
Mihipurwa	Bahraich	Newly Formed		
Miranpur	Muzaffarnagar	21,514	16	IND
Mirehachi	Etah	Newly Formed		
Mirganj	Bareilly	16,417	12	
Mohammadabad	Farrukhabad	18,606	15	
Mohammadabad Gohna	Mau	31,233	18	
Mohan	Unnao	10,582	12	
Mohanlalganj	Lucknow	Newly Formed		
Mohanpur	Kasganj	4,043	10	
Moth	Jhansi	10,215	12	
Mudiya	Budaun	5,124	10	
Mundera Bazar	Gorakhpur	8,735	11	
Munderwa	Basti	Newly Formed		
Mursan	Hathras	10,355	11	
Musafirkhana	Amethi	6,016	10	
Musanagar	Kanpur Dehat	Newly Formed		
Nadigaon	Jalaun	6,467	10	
Nagar Bazar	Basti	Newly Formed		
Nagra	Ballia	Newly Formed		
Nagram	Lucknow	8,737	10	
Nai Bazar	Bhadohi	10,783	11	
Nanauta	Saharanpur	18,144	13	BSP
Nandgaon	Mathura	9,873	10	
Naraini	Banda	9,940	12	
Narauli	Sambhal	13,884	13	
Narora	Bulandshahr	19,482	15	
Narpatnagar Dundawala	Rampur	Newly Formed		
Nasirabad	Raebareli	8,579	15	
Naugawan Sadat	Amroha	24,616	16	
Nawabganj	Farrukhabad	Newly Formed		
Nawabganj	Unnao	8,074	10	
Nichlaul	Maharajganj	14,333	13	
Nidhauli Kalan	Etah	6,947	10	
Nighasan	Lakhimpur Kheri	Newly Formed		
Nigohi	Shahjahanpur	Newly Formed		
Niwari	Ghaziabad	7,568	10	
Nizamabad	Azamgarh	10,276	11	
Nyoria Husainpur	Pilibhit	16,776	14	
Nyotini	Unnao	5,314	10	
Obra	Sonbhadra	32,646	18	
Oel Dhakwa	Lakhimpur Kheri	9,624	11	
Oran	Banda	5,133	10	
Pachperwa	Balrampur	13,648	12	
Pahasu	Bulandshahr	15,765	13	
Pakariya Naugawan	Pilibhit	Newly Formed		
Pakbara	Moradabad	28,505	18	
Pali	Hardoi	13,768	13	
Pali	Lalitpur	7,391	10	
Paniyara	Maharajganj	Newly Formed		
Paraspur	Gonda	11,923	15	
Parikshitgarh	Meerut	15,975	13	
Parsadepur	Raebareli	8,897	10	
Partawal	Maharajganj	Newly Formed		
Patala	Ghaziabad	7,755	10	
Patepur	Sitapur	9,918	11	
Pathardeva	Deoria	Newly Formed		
Patiyali	Kasganj	11,547	11	
Patti	Pratapgarh	7,671	10	
Payagpur	Bahraich	Newly Formed		
Phalauda	Meerut	15,712	13	
Phaphund	Auraiya	13,344	13	
Phulpur	Azamgarh	6,397	10	
Phulpur	Prayagraj	21,163	15	
Pilkhana	Aligarh	8,578	10	
Pinahat	Agra	14,934	13	
Pipiganj	Gorakhpur	11,033	11	
Pipraich	Gorakhpur	13,062	12	
Pipri	Sonbhadra	10,182	12	
Pisawa	Aligarh	Newly Formed		
Pratapgarh City	Pratapgarh	10,870	11	
Prithviganj	Pratapgarh	Newly Formed		
Purdilnagar	Hathras	16,025	13	
Purab-Pashchim Sharira	Kaushambi	Newly Formed		
Purkazi	Muzaffarnagar	19,222	15	IND
Purwa	Unnao	19,440	17	
Rabupura	Gautam Budh Nagar	12,715	12	
Radha Kund	Mathura	6,278	10	
Raja ka Rampur	Etah	9,263	11	
Rajapur	Chitrakoot	10,760	12	
Rajesultanpur	Ambedkar Nagar	21,965	15	BJP
Rajpur	Kanpur Dehat	Newly Formed		
Ramganj	Pratapgarh	Newly Formed		
Ramkola	Kushinagar	10,319	12	
Ramnagar	Barabanki	10,623	11	
Rampur	Jaunpur	Newly Formed		
Rampur Karkhana	Deoria	7,939	10	
Rampur Maniharan	Saharanpur	21,214	15	INC
Rampura	Jalaun	10,748	11	
Ram Sanehi Ghat	Barabanki	Newly Formed		
Rania	Kanpur Dehat	Newly Formed		
Raniganj	Pratapgarh	14,650	15	
Ranipur	Jhansi	14,183	14	
Rasulabad	Kanpur Dehat	16,629	13	
Rasulabad	Unnao	5,335	10	
Rataul	Baghpat	Newly Formed		
Rathaura	Bareilly	12,118	12	
Ratsar Kalan	Ballia	Newly Formed		
Raya	Mathura	18,002	14	
Renukoot	Sonbhadra	8,467	11	
Reoti	Ballia	20,488	15	
Richha	Bareilly	15,437	14	
Risia	Bahraich	10,310	11	
Roza	Shahjahanpur	9,207	11	
Rudayan	Budaun	6,226	10	
Rudhauli Bazar	Basti	16,419	15	
Rudrapur	Deoria	24,804	16	
Rupaidiha	Bahraich	Newly Formed		
Rura	Kanpur Dehat	12,857	12	
Sadabad	Hathras	27,471	17	
Sadat	Ghazipur	9,252	11	
Safipur	Unnao	17,957	15	
Sahanpur	Bijnor	16,080	14	
Sahaspur	Bijnor	18,189	15	
Sahatwar	Ballia	16,678	14	
Sahawar	Kasganj	18,332	15	
Sahjanwan	Gorakhpur	27,632	16	
Sahpau	Hathras	6,076	10	
Saidangali	Amroha	Newly Formed		
Saidpur	Budaun	12,584	12	
Saidpur	Ghazipur	18,367	15	
Saifni	Rampur	Newly Formed		
Sainthal	Bareilly	11,692	12	
Saiyad Raja	Chandauli	13,458	13	
Sakhanu	Budaun	7,633	10	
Sakit	Etah	6,319	10	
Salempur	Deoria	17,995	13	
Salon	Raebareli	11,765	12	
Samdhan	Kannauj	21,793	16	
Sankisa Basantpur	Farrukhabad	Newly Formed		
Sarai Aquil	Kaushambi	14,328	13	
Sarai Mir	Azamgarh	15,449	13	
Sarila	Hamirpur	6,858	10	
Sasni	Hathras	8,806	12	
Satrikh	Barabanki	9,959	11	
Saunkh	Mathura	7,757	10	
Saurikh	Kannauj	10,176	11	
Sewalkhas	Meerut	17,046	14	
Sewarhi	Kushinagar	16,949	14	
Shahabad	Rampur	30,276	17	
Shahi	Bareilly	11,805	12	
Shahjahanpur	Meerut	12,381	13	
Shahpur	Muzaffarnagar	16,329	13	BJP
Shamsabad	Farrukhabad	28,580	19	
Shankargarh	Prayagraj	12,818	12	
Shergarh	Bareilly	11,565	12	
Shishgarh	Bareilly	18,831	15	
Shivgarh	Raebareli	Newly Formed		
Shivli	Kanpur Dehat	6,296	10	
Shivrajpur	Kanpur Nagar	8,609	11	
Shohratgarh	Siddharthanagar	7,189	10	
Siddhaur	Barabanki	9,691	11	
Sidhauli	Sitapur	21,185	14	
Sidhpura	Kasganj	12,433	12	
Sikandara	Kanpur Dehat	10,584	11	
Sikandarpur	Ballia	18,430	15	
Sikanderpur	Kannauj	7,199	10	
Singahi Bhiraura	Lakhimpur Kheri	13,466	13	
Sirathu	Kaushambi	10,646	11	
Sirauli	Bareilly	17,912	14	
Sirsa	Prayagraj	9,621	11	
Sirsi	Sambhal	21,694	15	
Sisauli	Muzaffarnagar	11,596	13	IND
Sonauli	Maharajganj	14,366	14	
Subeha	Barabanki	10,642	11	
Sukrauli	Kushinagar	Newly Formed		
Sumerpur	Hamirpur	29,825	18	
Suriyawan	Bhadohi	14,074	13	
Suwansa Bazar	Pratapgarh	Newly Formed		
Swamibagh	Agra	1,585	10	
Talbehat	Lalitpur	10,869	12	
Talgram	Kannauj	9,129	11	
Tambaur Ahmadabad	Sitapur	19,010	14	
Tamkuhi Raj	Kushinagar	Newly Formed		
Tappal	Aligarh	Newly Formed		
Tarabganj	Gonda	Newly Formed		
Tarkulwa	Deoria	Newly Formed		
Tatiri	Baghpat	11,326	11	
Thana Bhawan	Shamli	30,042	17	IND
Thiriya Nizamat Khan	Bareilly	17,935	14	
Tikait Nagar	Barabanki	6,649	10	
Tikri	Baghpat	11,666	12	
Tindwari	Banda	7,926	10	
Tirwaganj	Kannauj	18,910	15	
Titron	Saharanpur	8,518	11	SP
Tondi Fatehpur	Jhansi	8,777	11	
Tulsipur	Balrampur	19,084	15	
Ugu	Unnao	4,234	10	
Ujhari	Amroha	17,190	14	
Umri	Jalaun	7,263	10	
Umri Kalan	Moradabad	12,807	13	
Un	Shamli	13,294	12	BSP
Unchahar	Raebareli	9,372	10	
Uruwa Bazar	Gorakhpur	Newly Formed		
Usawan	Budaun	10,437	11	
Usehat	Budaun	12,899	11	
Uska Bazar	Siddharthanagar	20,075	15	
Vijaigarh	Aligarh	5,703	10	
Walidpur	Mau	19,215	16	
Wazirganj	Budaun	17,165	13	
Zaidpur	Barabanki	27,535	17	

== Overview (district wise list) ==
Sr. no.	District	Nagar Nigam	Nagar Palika Parishad	Nagar Panchayat
1	Agra	Agra	1. Achhnera; 2. Bah; 3. Etmadpur; 4. Fatehpur Sikri; 5. Shamsabad	1. Dayalbagh; 2. Fatehabad; 3. Jagner; 4. Kheragarh; 5. Kuraoli; 6. Pinahat; 7. Swamibagh
2	Aligarh	Aligarh	1. Atrauli; 2. Khair	1. Barauli; 2. Beswan; 3. Chandaus; 4. Chharra; 5. Gabhana; 6. Harduaganj; 7. Iglas; 8. Jalali; 9. Jattari; 10. Jawan Sikandarpur; 11. Kauriaganj; 12. Madrak; 13. Pilkhana; 14. Pisawa; 15. Tappal; 16. Vijaigarh
3	Ambedkar Nagar	NA	1. Akbarpur; 2. Jalalpur; 3. Tanda	1. Ashrafpur Kichhauchha; 2. Iltifatganj; 3. Jahangirganj; 4. Rajesultanpur
4	Amethi	NA	1. Gauriganj; 2. Jais	1. Amethi; 2. Musafirkhana
5	Amroha	NA	1. Amroha; 2. Bachhraon; 3. Dhanaura; 4. Gajraula; 5. Hasanpur	1. Joya; 2. Naugawan Sadat; 3. Saidangali; 4. Ujhari
6	Auraiya	NA	1. Auraiya	1. Achhalda; 2. Atasu; 3. Babarpur Ajitmal; 4. Bidhuna; 5. Dibiyapur; 6. Phaphund
7	Ayodhya	Ayodhya	1. Rudauli	1. Bhadarsa; 2. Bikapur; 3. Goshainganj; 4. Khirauni Suchittaganj; 5. Kumarganj; 6. Maa Kamakhya
8	Azamgarh	NA	1. Azamgarh; 2. Bilariaganj; 3. Mubarakpur	1. Atraulia; 2. Azmatgarh; 3. Budhanpur; 4. Jahanaganj Bazar; 5. Jiyanpur; 6. Katghar Lalganj; 7. Maharajganj; 8. Mahul; 9. Martinganj; 10. Mehnagar; 11. Nizamabad; 12. Phulpur; 13. Sarai Mir
9	Baghpat	NA	1. Baghpat; 2. Baraut; 3. Khekada	1. Aminagar Sarai; 2. Chhaprauli; 3. Doghat; 4. Rataul; 5. Tatiri; 6. Tikri
10	Bahraich	NA	1. Bahraich; 2. Nanpara	1. Jarwal; 2. Kaiserganj; 3. Mihipurwa; 4. Payagpur; 5. Risia; 6. Rupaidiha
11	Ballia	NA	1. Ballia; 2. Rasara	1. Bairia; 2. Bansdih; 3. Belthara Road; 4. Chitbara Gaon; 5. Maniyar; 6. Nagra; 7. Ratsar Kalan; 8. Reoti; 9. Sahatwar; 10. Sikanderpur
12	Balrampur	NA	1. Balrampur; 2. Utraula	1. Gainsari; 2. Pachperwa; 3. Tulsipur
13	Banda	NA	1. Atarra; 2. Banda	1. Baberu; 2. Bisanda; 3. Mataundh; 4. Naraini; 5. Oran; 6. Tindwari
14	Barabanki	NA	1. Nawabganj	1. Banki; 2. Belahra; 3. Dariyabad; 4. Dewa; 5. Fatehpur; 6. Haidergarh; 7. Ramnagar; 8. Ram Sanehi Ghat; 9. Satrikh; 10. Siddhaur; 11. Subeha; 12. Tikait Nagar; 13. Zaidpur
15	Bareilly	Bareilly	1. Aonla; 2. Baheri; 3. Faridpur; 4. Nawabganj	1. Bisharatganj; 2. Deoranian; 3. Dhaura Tanda; 4. Faridpur; 5. Fatehganj Pashchimi; 6. Fatehganj Purvi; 7. Mirganj; 8. Rathaura; 9. Richha; 10. Sainthal; 11. Shahi; 12. Shergarh; 13. Shishgarh; 14. Sirauli; 15. Thiriya Nizamat Khan
16	Basti	NA	1. Basti	1. Babhnan Bazar; 2. Bankati; 3. Bhanpur; 4. Ganeshpur; 5. Gayghat; 6. Harraiya; 7. Kaptanganj; 8. Munderwa; 9. Nagar Bazar; 10. Rudhauli Bazar
17	Bhadohi	NA	1. Bhadohi; 2. Gopiganj	1. Ghosia; 2. Gyanpur; 3. Khamaria; 4. Nai Bazar; 5. Suriyawan
18	Bijnor	NA	1. Afzalgarh; 2. Bijnor; 3. Chandpur; 4. Dhampur; 5. Haldaur; 6. Kiratpur; 7. Nagina; 8. Najibabad; 9. Nehtaur; 10. Noorpur; 11. Seohara; 12. Sherkot	1. Barhapur; 2. Jalalabad; 3. Jhalu; 4. Mandawar; 5. Sahanpur; 6. Sahaspur
19	Budaun	NA	1. Bilsi; 2. Bisauli; 3. Budaun; 4. Dataganj; 5. Kakrala; 6. Sahaswan; 7. Ujhani	1. Alapur; 2. Dahgawan; 3. Faizganj; 4. Gulariya; 5. Islamnagar; 6. Kachhla; 7. Kunwargaon; 8. Mudiya; 9. Rudayan; 10. Saidpur; 11. Sakhanu; 12. Usawan; 13. Usehat; 14. Wazirganj
20	Bulandshahr	NA	1. Anupshahr; 2. Bulandshahr; 3. Dibai; 4. Gulaothi; 5. Jahangirabad; 6. Khurja; 7. Shikarpur; 8. Sikandrabad; 9. Syana	1. Aurangabad; 2. Bhawan Bahadur Nagar; 3. Bugrasi; 4. Chhatari; 5. Kakod; 6. Khanpur; 7. Narora; 8. Pahasu
21	Chandauli	NA	1. Pt. Deen Dayal Upadhyay Nagar	1. Chakia; 2. Chandauli; 3. Saiyad Raja
22	Chitrakoot	NA	1. Chitrakoot Dham (Karwi)	1. Manikpur; 2. Mau; 3. Rajapur
23	Deoria	NA	1. Gaura Barhaj; 2. Deoria	1. Baitalpur; 2. Bariyarpur; 3. Bhaluani; 4. Bhatni; 5. Bhatpar Rani; 6. Gauri Bazar; 7. Hetimpur; 8. Lar; 9. Madanpur; 10. Majhauli Raj; 11. Pathardeva; 12. Rampur Karkhana; 13. Rudrapur; 14. Salempur; 15. Tarkulwa
24	Etah	NA	1. Aliganj; 2. Etah; 3. Jalesar; 4. Marhara	1. Awagarh; 2. Jaithara; 3. Mirehachi; 4. Nidhauli Kalan; 5. Raja Ka Rampur; 6. Sakit
25	Etawah	NA	1. Bharthana; 2. Etawah; 3. Jaswantnagar	1. Bakewar; 2. Ekdil; 3. Lakhna
26	Farrukhabad	NA	1. Farrukhabad; 2. Kaimganj	1. Kamalganj; 2. Kampil; 3. Khimsepur; 4. Mohammadabad; 5. Nawabganj; 6. Sankisa Basantpur; 7. Shamsabad
27	Fatehpur	NA	1. Bindki; 2. Fatehpur	1. Asothar; 2. Bahuwa; 3. Hathgaon; 4. Karikan Dhata; 5. Khaga; 6. Khakhreru; 7. Kishunpur; 8. Kora Jahanabad
28	Firozabad	Firozabad	1. Shikohabad; 2. Sirsaganj; 3. Tundla	1. Eka; 2. Fariha; 3. Jasrana; 4. Makkhanpur
29	Gautam Budh Nagar	NA	1. Dadri	1. Bilaspur; 2. Dankaur; 3. Jahangirpur; 4. Jewar; 5. Rabupura
30	Ghaziabad	Ghaziabad	1. Khoda-Makanpur; 2. Loni; 3. Modinagar; 4. Muradnagar	1. Dasna; 2. Faridnagar; 3. Niwari; 4. Patala
31	Ghazipur	NA	1. Ghazipur; 2. Mohammadabad; 3. Zamania	1. Bahadurganj; 2. Dildarnagar; 3. Jangipur; 4. Sadat; 5. Saidpur
32	Gonda	NA	1. Colonelganj; 2. Gonda; 3. Nawabganj	1. Belsar; 2. Dhanepur; 3. Katra; 4. Khargupur; 5. Mankapur; 6. Paraspur; 7. Tarabganj
33	Gorakhpur	Gorakhpur	NA	1. Bansgaon; 2. Barhalganj; 3. Campierganj; 4. Ghaghsara Bazar; 5. Gola Bazar; 6. Kasba Sangrampur Unwal; 7. Mundera Bazar; 8. Pipiganj; 9. Pipraich; 10. Sahjanwan; 11. Uruwa Bazar
34	Hamirpur	NA	1. Hamirpur; 2. Maudaha; 3. Rath	1. Gohand; 2. Kurara; 3. Sarila; 4. Sumerpur
35	Hapur	NA	1. Garhmukteshwar; 2. Hapur; 3. Pilkhuwa	1. Babugarh
36	Hardoi	NA	1. Bilgram; 2. Hardoi; 3. Mallawan; 4. Pihani; 5. Sandi; 6. Sandila; 7. Shahabad	1. Beniganj; 2. Gopamau; 3. Kachhauna Patseni; 4. Kursath; 5. Madhoganj; 6. Pali
37	Hathras	NA	1. Hathras; 2. Sikandra Rao	1. Hasayan; 2. Mendu; 3. Mursan; 4. Purdilnagar; 5. Sadabad; 6. Sahpau; 7. Sasni
38	Jalaun	NA	1. Jalaun; 2. Kalpi; 3. Konch; 4. Orai	1. Ait; 2. Kadaura; 3. Kotra; 4. Madhogarh; 5. Nadigaon; 6. Rampura; 7. Umri
39	Jaunpur	NA	1. Jaunpur; 2. Mungra Badshahpur; 3. Shahganj	1. Badlapur; 2. Gaurabadshahpur; 3. Jafarabad; 4. Kajgaon; 5. Kerakat; 6. Kheta Sarai; 7. Machhlishahr; 8. Mariahu; 9. Rampur
40	Jhansi	Jhansi	1. Barua Sagar; 2. Chirgaon; 3. Gursarai; 4. Mauranipur; 5. Samthar	1. Bada Gaon; 2. Erich; 3. Garautha; 4. Kathera; 5. Moth; 6. Ranipur; 7. Tondi Fatehpur
41	Kannauj	NA	1. Chhibramau; 2. Gursahaiganj; 3. Kannauj	1. Samdhan; 2. Saurikh; 3. Sikanderpur; 4. Talgram; 5. Tirwaganj
42	Kanpur Dehat	NA	1. Jhinjhak; 2. Pukhrayan	1. Akbarpur; 2. Amraudha; 3. Derapur; 4. Kanchausi; 5. Musanagar; 6. Rajpur; 7. Rania; 8. Rasulabad; 9. Rura; 10. Shivli; 11. Sikandara
43	Kanpur Nagar	Kanpur	1. Bilhaur; 2. Ghatampur	1. Bithoor; 2. Shivrajpur
44	Kasganj	NA	1. Ganj Dundawara; 2. Kasganj; 3. Soron	1. Amanpur; 2. Bhargain; 3. Bilram; 4. Mohanpur; 5. Patiyali; 6. Sahawar; 7. Sidhpura
45	Kaushambi	NA	1. Bharwari; 2. Manjhanpur	1. Ajhuwa; 2. Chail; 3. Charwa; 4. Daraganj alias Karadham; 5. Karari; 6. Purab-Pashchim Sharira; 7. Sarai Aquil; 8. Sirathu
46	Kushinagar	NA	1. Hata; 2. Kushinagar; 3. Padrauna	1. Chhitauni; 2. Dudahi; 3. Kaptanganj; 4. Khadda; 5. Fazilnagar; 6. Mathauli; 7. Ramkola; 8. Sewarhi; 9. Sukrauli; 10. Tamkuhi Raj
47	Lakhimpur Kheri	NA	1. Gola Gokarannath; 2. Lakhimpur; 3. Mohammadi; 4. Palia Kalan	1. Bardar; 2. Bhira; 3. Dhaurahra; 4. Kheri; 5. Mailani; 6. Nighasan; 7. Oel Dhakwa; 8. Singahi Bhiraura
48	Lalitpur	NA	1. Lalitpur	1. Mahroni; 2. Pali; 3. Talbehat
49	Lucknow	Lucknow	NA	1. Amethi; 2. Bakshi Ka Talab; 3. Banthra; 4. Gosainganj; 5. Itaunja; 6. Kakori; 7. Mahona; 8. Malihabad; 9. Mohanlalganj; 10. Nagram
50	Maharajganj	NA	1. Maharajganj; 2. Nautanwa; 3. Siswa Bazar	1. Anandnagar; 2. Brijmanganj; 3. Chowk; 4. Ghughali; 5. Nichlaul; 6. Paniyara; 7. Partawal; 8. Sonauli
51	Mahoba	NA	1. Charkhari; 2. Mahoba	1. Kabrai; 2. Kharela; 3. Kulpahar
52	Mainpuri	NA	1. Mainpuri	1. Barnahal; 2. Bewar; 3. Bhogaon; 4. Ghiraur; 5. Jyoti Khuria; 6. Karhal; 7. Kishni; 8. Kuraoli; 9. Kusmara
53	Mathura	Mathura-Vrindavan	1. Kosi Kalan	1. Bajna; 2. Baldev; 3. Barsana; 4. Chaumuhan; 5. Chhata; 6. Farah; 7. Gokul; 8. Goverdhan; 9. Mahaban; 10. Nandgaon; 11. Radha Kund; 12. Raya; 13. Saunkh
54	Mau	NA	1. Mau	1. Adari; 2. Amila; 3. Chiraiyakot; 4. Dohrighat; 5. Ghosi; 6. Kopaganj; 7. Kurthi Jafarpur; 8. Madhuban; 9. Mohammadabad Gohna; 10. Walidpur
55	Meerut	Meerut	1. Mawana; 2. Sardhana	1. Bahsuma; 2. Daurala; 3. Harra; 4. Hastinapur; 5. Karnawal; 6. Kharkhauda; 7. Khiwai; 8. Kithaur; 9. Lawar; 10. Parikshitgarh; 11. Phalauda; 12. Sewalkhas; 13. Shahjahanpur
56	Mirzapur	NA	1. Ahraura; 2. Chunar; 3. Mirzapur	1. Kachhwa
57	Moradabad	Moradabad	1. Bilari; 2. Thakurdwara	1. Agwanpur; 2. Bhojpur Dharampur; 3. Dhakia; 4. Kanth; 5. Kundarki; 6. Mehmoodpur Maafi; 7. Pakbara; 8. Umri Kalan
58	Muzaffarnagar	NA	1. Khatauli; 2. Muzaffarnagar	1. Bhokarhedi; 2. Budhana; 3. Charthaval; 4. Jansath; 5. Miranpur; 6. Purkazi; 7. Shahpur; 8. Sisauli
59	Pilibhit	NA	1. Bisalpur; 2. Pilibhit; 3. Puranpur	1. Barkhera; 2. Bilsanda; 3. Gularia Bhindara; 4. Jahanabad; 5. Kalinagar; 6. Nyoria Husainpur; 7. Pakariya Naugawan
60	Pratapgarh	NA	1. Bela Pratapgarh	1. Antu; 2. Dhakwa; 3. Garwara Bazar; 4. Hiraganj Bazar; 5. Katra Gulab Singh; 6. Katra Medniganj; 7. Kohdaur; 8. Kunda; 9. Lalganj Ajhara; 10. Manikpur; 11. Patti; 12. Pratapgarh City; 13. Prithviganj; 14. Ramganj; 15. Raniganj; 16. Suwansa Bazar
61	Prayagraj	Prayagraj	NA	1. Bharatganj; 2. Handia; 3. Jhusi; 4. Koraon; 5. Lal Gopalganj; 6. Mau Aima; 7. Phulpur; 8. Shankargarh; 9. Sirsa
62	Raebareli	NA	1. Raebareli	1. Bachhrawan; 2. Dalmau; 3. Lalganj; 4. Maharajganj; 5. Nasirabad; 6. Parsadepur; 7. Salon; 8. Shivgarh; 9. Unchahar
63	Rampur	NA	1. Bilaspur; 2. Milak; 3. Rampur; 4. Suar; 5. Tanda	1. Dadhiyal; 2. Kemri; 3. Maswasi; 4. Narpatnagar Dundawala; 5. Saifni; 6. Shahabad
64	Saharanpur	Saharanpur	1. Deoband; 2. Gangoh; 3. Nakur; 4. Sarsawa	1. Ambehta; 2. Behat; 3. Chhutmalpur; 4. Chilkana Sultanpur; 5. Nanauta; 6. Rampur Maniharan; 7. Titron
65	Sambhal	NA	1. Bahjoi; 2. Chandausi; 3. Sambhal	1. Babrala; 2. Gawan; 3. Gunnaur; 4. Narauli; 5. Sirsi
66	Sant Kabir Nagar	NA	1. Khalilabad	1. Baghnagar; 2. Belhar Kalan; 3. Hainsar Bazar Dhanghata; 4. Dharmsinghwa; 5. Hariharpur; 6. Maghar; 7. Menhdawal
67	Shahjahanpur	Shahjahanpur	1. Jalalabad; 2. Powayan; 3. Tilhar	1. Allahganj; 2. Banda; 3. Kalan; 4. Kant; 5. Katra; 6. Khudaganj; 7. Khutar; 8. Nigohi; 9. Roza
68	Shamli	NA	1. Kairana; 2. Kandhla; 3. Shamli	1. Ailam; 2. Banat; 3. Garhi Pukhta; 4. Jalalabad; 5. Jhinjhana; 6. Thana Bhawan; 7. Un
69	Shravasti	NA	1. Bhinga	1. Ikauna
70	Siddharthanagar	NA	1. Bansi; 2. Siddharthanagar	1. Barhani Bazar; 2. Barhni Chafa; 3. Bharat Bhari; 4. Biskohar; 5. Domariaganj; 6. Itwa; 7. Kapilvastu; 8. Shohratgarh; 9. Uska Bazar
71	Sitapur	NA	1. Biswan; 2. Khairabad; 3. Laharpur; 4. Mahmoodabad; 5. Misrikh Neemsar; 6. Sitapur	1. Hargaon; 2. Maholi; 3. Patepur; 4. Sidhauli; 5. Tambaur Ahmadabad
72	Sonbhadra	NA	1. Robertsganj	1. Anpara; 2. Chopan; 3. Churk Ghurma; 4. Dala Bazar; 5. Duddhi; 6. Ghorawal; 7. Obra; 8. Pipri; 9. Renukoot
73	Sultanpur	NA	1. Sultanpur	1. Dostpur; 2. Kadipur; 3. Koeripur; 4. Lambhua
74	Unnao	NA	1. Bangarmau; 2. Gangaghat; 3. Unnao	1. Achalganj; 2. Auras; 3. Bhagwant Nagar; 4. Bighapur; 5. Fatehpur Chaurasi; 6. Ganj Muradabad; 7. Hyderabad; 8. Kursath; 9. Maurawan; 10. Mohan; 11. Nawabganj; 12. Nyotini; 13. Purwa; 14. Rasulabad; 15. Safipur; 16. Ugu
75	Varanasi	Varanasi	NA	1. Gangapur

== Elections ==
Elections to the urban local bodies in Uttar Pradesh are held once in five years, are conducted by Uttar Pradesh State Election Commission. Last elections was held in 2017 & next elections for urban local bodies are to be held in November -December 2022.

== See also ==
- Local government in India
- Municipal governance in India
- List of municipal corporations in India
- List of cities in India by population
- Uttar Pradesh State Election Commission
