= Bataparu =

Village in Mainpuri, Uttar Pradesh, India

Bataparu is a village in Kishni tehsil in Mainpuri district in the Indian state of Uttar Pradesh. It belongs to Agra division.

== Location ==
It is located 39 km towards South from District headquarters Mainpuri and 195 km from State capital Lucknow. Its Pin Code is 206303 and postal head office is Kusmara.
