= Atasu =

Atasu may refer to:

- Atasu, Uttar Pradesh, a town in Uttar Pradesh, India
- Atasu (river), a tributary of the Sarysu, Kazakhstan
- Atasu, Kazakhstan (now Zhanaarka), a town in Ulytau Region, Kazakhstan, endpoint of Kazakhstan-China oil pipeline.
