= Bisanda Buzurg =

Bisanda Buzurg Bisanda
- Town
- Location in Uttar Pradesh, India Bisanda Buzurg (India)
- Coordinates: 25°25′N 80°37′E
- Country: India
- State: Uttar Pradesh
- District: Banda

Government
  - Type: chairman

Population (2011)
  - Total: 11,611

Languages
  - Official: Hindi
- Time zone: UTC+5:30 (IST)
- 21: 210203
- Vehicle registration: UP90
- Website: up.gov.in

Bisanda Buzurg town and a nagar panchayat municipality in Banda district in the state of Uttar Pradesh, India. Pin Code of Bisanda is 210203. Language of Bisanda is Bundeli, Hindi.

== Demographics ==
As of 2011 India census, Bisanda Buzurg city is divided into 11 wards for which elections are held every 5 years. The Bisanda Buzurg Nagar Panchayat has population of 25,611 of which 13,138 are males while 12,473 are females as per report released by Census India 2011. About 94% are Hindu and 6% Muslim.

Buzurg is commonly called as BISANDA and the distance of Khajuraho from Bisanda is about 135 km, and Chitrakoot is about 64 km.
