= Oran, India =

Oran, India Oran
- Town
- Location in Uttar Pradesh, India Oran, India (India)
- Coordinates: 25.38°N 80.75°E
- Country: India
- State: Uttar Pradesh
- District: Banda
- Elevation: 118 m (387 ft)

Population (2001)
  - Total: 6,189

Languages
  - Official: Hindi
- Time zone: UTC+5:30 (IST)
- Vehicle registration: UP
- Website: up.gov.in

Oran is a town and a nagar panchayat in Banda district in the Indian state of Uttar Pradesh.

== Geography ==
Oran is located at 25.38°N 80.75°E. It has an average elevation of 118 metres (387 feet).

== Demographics ==
As of the 2001 Census of India, Oran had a population of 6,189. Males constitute 55% of the population and females 45%. Oran has an average literacy rate of 46%, lower than the national average of 59.5%: male literacy is 59%, and female literacy is 30%. In Oran, 19% of the population is under 6 years of age.
