= Vijaigarh =

- Town
- Location in Uttar Pradesh, India
- Coordinates: 27.72046°N 78.226368°E
- Country: India
- State: Uttar Pradesh
- District: Aligarh

Population (2011)
  - Total: 7,124

Language
  - Official: Hindi
  - Additional official: Urdu
- Time zone: UTC+5:30 (IST)

Vijaigarh is a town and a nagar panchayat in Aligarh district in the Indian state of Uttar Pradesh.

== Demographics ==
As of 2001 India census, Vijaigarh had a population of 5921. Males constitute 53% of the population and females 47%. Vijaigarh has an average literacy rate of 57%, lower than the national average of 59.5%: male literacy is 66%, and female literacy is 47%. In Vijaigarh, 17% of the population is under 6 years of age.
