= Oel Dhakwa =

Coordinates: 9.2167°N 1.8500°W

- Town
- Interactive map of Oel Dhakwa
- Country: India
- State: Uttar Pradesh
- District: Lakhimpur Kheri

Population (2011)
  - Total: 12,958

Languages
  - Official: Hindi
- Time zone: UTC+5:30 (IST)

Oel Dhakwa is a town and a nagar panchayat in Lakhimpur Kheri district in the Indian state of Uttar Pradesh.

== Demographics ==
As of 2001 India census, Oel Dhakwa had a population of 12,958. Males constitute 53% of the population and females 47%. Oel Dhakwa has an average literacy rate of 51%, lower than the national average of 59.5%: male literacy is 59%, and female literacy is 42%. In Oel Dhakwa, 17% of the population is under 6 years of age.
