= Maswasi =

- Town
- Location in Uttar Pradesh, India Maswasi (India)
- Coordinates: 29.101°N 79.063°E
- Country: India
- State: Uttar Pradesh
- District: Rampur

Population (2001)
  - Total: 15,207

Languages
  - Official: Hindi
- Time zone: UTC+5:30 (IST)
- Vehicle registration: UP 22
- Website: up.gov.in

Maswasi is a town and a nagar panchayat in Rampur district in the Indian state of Uttar Pradesh.

== Demographics ==
As of 2001 India census, Maswasi had a population of 15,207. Males constitute 53% of the population and females 47%. Maswasi has an average literacy rate of 73%, higher than the national average of 59.5%: male literacy is 84%, and female literacy is 61%. In Maswasi, 20% of the population is under 6 years of age.
