= Mataundh =

Mataundh Mataundh, Banda, Uttar Pradesh
- Town
- Location in Uttar Pradesh, India Mataundh (India)
- Coordinates: 25.45°N 80.15°E
- Country: India
- State: Uttar Pradesh
- District: Banda
- Elevation: 142 m (466 ft)

Population (2001)
  - Total: 8,278

Languages
  - Official: Hindi
- Time zone: UTC+5:30 (IST)
- Vehicle registration: UP
- Website: up.gov.in

Mataundh is a town and a nagar panchayat in Banda district in the Indian state of Uttar Pradesh.

== Geography ==
Mataundh is located at 25.45°N 80.15°E. It has an average elevation of 142 metres (465 feet).

== Demographics ==
As of 2001 India census, Mataundh had a population of 8278. Males constitute 53% of the population and females 47%. Mataundh has an average literacy rate of 47%, lower than the national average of 59.5%: male literacy is 57%, and female literacy is 35%. In Mataundh, 17% of the population is under 6 years of age.
