= Saidpur, Badaun =

Saidpur, Badaun Saidpur saidpuriya
- Town(kasba)
- Location in Uttar Pradesh, India
- Coordinates: 28.2403°N 79.0310°E
- Country: India
- State: Uttar Pradesh
- District: Badaun
  - Chairman: (Ishrat Ali Khan BJP)
- Elevation: 70 m (230 ft)

Population (2001)
  - Total: 15,000

Languages
  - Official: Hindi & Urdu
- Time zone: UTC+5:30 (IST)

Saidpur is a town and a nagar panchayat in the Badaun district of the Indian state of Uttar Pradesh.

== Geography and climate ==
As with other areas in the North Indian plains, Saidpur has three seasons: winter, summer and spring, with most rainfall occurring in spring. Summer (April–June) temperatures range from around 40 to 50 °C (104 to 122 °F). The low temperatures in winter are below 4 to 7 °C (39 to 45 °F). Spring (February - March) is especially temperate, with temperatures of about 15 to 20 °C (59 to 68 °F) .

== Demographics ==
As of the 2001 India census, Saidpur had a population of 13,717. Males constituted 52% of the population and females 48%. Saidpur had an average literacy rate of 40%, lower than the national average of 59.5%. Male literacy was 46% and female literacy was 34%. 18% of the population is under six years of age. According to some estimates, 90% of the population is Muslim and 10% is Hindu.

== Culture ==
The large Muslim population celebrates Islamic festivals, especially Eid-ul Adha and Eid-ul Fitr. The people celebrate Ramadan, Eid al Adha and Eid al Fitr. There are fourteen mosques and one temple in Saidpur. Saidpur has an old horse fair (Numaaish named Agha Sahab Wala Purana Kisan Mela organised by people of Khanchi thrice a year. People come from every part of India for the business of horses.

== Aldermanry ==
1-Mohalla Khanchi

2-Noori Chowk (Quresiyan Mohalla)

3-Khawaja Chowk

4-Azhari Chowk (Masjid Ameer khan)

5-Kheda Shadat (Sadat Chowk)

6-Mohalla Pachim

7-Girdarpur (Mohalla purab)

8-Kaoaa Tola (Jama Masjid)

9-Darji Chowk (bajariya)

10-Raza Nagar (Mirzapur)

11-Dullan Nagri

12-Mohalla Qazi

13-Mohalla Jhanda

14-Gaus Nagar (Nai Basti)

15-Bada Takiya Ashraf nagar
