= Jalalabad, Bijnor =

- Town
- Location in Uttar Pradesh, India Jalalabad, Bijnor (India)
- Coordinates: 29°35′50″N 78°18′55″E
- Country: India
- State: Uttar Pradesh
- District: Bijnor
- Elevation: 133 m (436 ft)

Population (2001)
  - Total: 16,113

Languages
  - Official: Hindi
- Time zone: UTC+5:30 (IST)
- Vehicle registration: UP
- Website: up.gov.in

Jalalabad (Jalālābād) is a town and a nagar panchayat in Bijnor district in the Indian state of Uttar Pradesh. Habib khan was 1st pradhan of jalalabad after independence of India for many years. On his name NGO habibia gram vikas sansthan jalalabad running a school named Habib memorial school and Madarsa Habibia lilbanat.

== Geography ==
Jalalabad has an average elevation of 133 metres (436 feet).

== Demographics ==
As of the 2001 Census of India, Jalalabad had a population of 16,113. Males constitute 53% of the population and females 47%. Jalalabad has an average literacy rate of 39%, lower than the national average of 59.5%: male literacy is 44%, and female literacy is 33%. In Jalalabad, 21% of the population is under 6 years of age.

== History ==
The town was founded during the reign of Jalaluddin Firuz Shah of the Khalji dynasty of the Delhi Sultanate.
