= Richha =

Richha Richha Industrial Area
- Town
- Richha
- Location in Uttar Pradesh, India
- Coordinates: 28.694°N 79.521°E
- Country: India
- State: Uttar Pradesh
- District: Bareilly
- Established: 1885

Government
  - Body: Nagar panchayat
- Elevation: 274 m (899 ft)

Population (2011)
  - Total: 20,977
- Time zone: UTC+5:30 (IST)
- Postal code: 243201
- Vehicle registration: UP 25

Richha is a town and a nagar panchayat in Bareilly district in the Indian state of Uttar Pradesh.Also known as [Chawal Nagri of India].

As of the 2011 Census, Richha had a population of 20,977, with 11,076 males and 9,901 females. Children aged 0-6 comprised 13.43% of the population. The current estimated population of Richha Nagar Panchayat in 2025 is approximately 30,400. The scheduled 2021 census for Richha town was postponed due to the COVID-19 pandemic.

The literacy rate stood at 62.86%, with male literacy at 69.33% and female literacy at 55.62%. Richha is characterized by its diverse community, with a majority Muslim population (86.97%), followed by Hindus (5.97%), and other religions. The town is home to numerous mosques and temples, reflecting its cultural diversity.

It has more than 80 rice industries currently and number keeps on increasing with the some giant tycoons like Hussain Rice Mill,Nazeer, Rehman, Malik, Qadri, Sunrise Industries and Sulaiman Industries etc. Rice mills are flourishing in this area for many decades. Most of these are situated on the Pilibhit Road. The majority of residents are employed in these rice mills. A community health centre was established upon the ruins of about a century old hospital near Lal Bahadur Shastri Inter College in the year 2016.

== Richha Railway Station ==
Richha Road Railway Station, located on Bareilly-Lalkuan Route which is 5 km away from the centre of the town. It is an important station in one of India's busiest and most populous states. Identified by the station code 'RR'. A total of 27 trains pass through the Richha Road (RR) junction, highlighting its significance in the region's railway connectivity, which connects the town to important Grade A+, A and B Railway stations like Delhi, Bareilly, Lucknow, Lalkuan and Haldwani etc.

== Geography ==
Richha is located at 28°41′38″N 79°31′16″E. It has an average elevation of 274 metres (887 feet).

Richha is a mixture of all major castes and religions, living together peacefully. Most of the population here are banjaras. The majority of the Muslims followed by Hindus living together peacefully. There are many mosques and temples in the town.

Richha is famous for having best educational choices as many people are studying in Aligarh Muslim University from Richha
