= Bharatganj =

- Town
- Location in Uttar Pradesh, India Bharatganj (India)
- Coordinates: 25°07′11″N 82°16′26″E
- Country: India
- State: Uttar Pradesh
- District: Prayagraj
- Established: 1913
- Wards: List: Ward 1- Ambedkar Nagar; Ward 2- Katra Uttari; Ward 3- Nai Bazar (Garopur); Ward 4- Kadam Rasool; Ward 5- Gadiwan; Ward 6- Mangalwari Bazar; Ward 7- Chikan; Ward 8- Tilhan Tola; Ward 9- Katra Dakshini; Ward 10- Shukrawari Bazar; Ward 11- Juber Nagar; Ward 12- Mohammad Ali Road East; Ward 13- Mohammad Ali Road West

Government
  - Type: Nagar Panchayat
  - Chairman: Fara Begam W/o Amir Shakeel Tanki

Area
  - Total: 2 km^{2} (0.77 sq mi)

Population (2011)
  - Total: 16,345
  - Density: 8,200/km^{2} (21,000/sq mi)

Language
  - Official: Hindi
  - Additional official: Urdu
- Time zone: UTC+5:30 (IST)
- Pin Code: 212104
- Vehicle registration: UP-70
- Website: npbharatganj.in

Bharatganj is a Nagar Panchayat city in district of Prayagraj, Uttar Pradesh.

== Demographics ==
The Bharatganj Nagar Panchayat has population of 16,345 of which 8,467 are males while 7,878 are females as per report released by Census India 2011. Population of children with age of 0-6 is 2572 which is 15.74% of total population of Bharatganj (NP). In Bharatganj Nagar Panchayat, the female sex ratio is 930 against state average of 912. Moreover, the child sex ratio in Bharatganj is around 1000 compared to Uttar Pradesh state average of 902. The literacy rate of Bharatganj city is 65.48% lower than state average of 67.68%. In Bharatganj, male literacy is around 75.42% while the female literacy rate is 54.64%.

Bharatganj (NP) has following religion data according to 2011 census: Muslim (Sunni)- 62.45%, Hindu- 36.92%, Other- 0.63%. Schedule Caste (SC) constitutes 12.27% of total population in Bharatganj. The Bharatganj currently does not have any Schedule Tribe (ST) population.

Bharatganj Nagar Panchayat has total administration over 2,390 houses to which it supplies basic amenities like water and sewerage. It is also authorize to build roads within Nagar Panchayat limits and impose taxes on properties coming under its jurisdiction.

== Administration ==
The Bharatganj city is divided into 13 wards for which elections are held every 5 years.

The details of all chairman of Bharatganj are given as:

1. Mr. Ahmad Rasool Khan (1958-1968)

2. Mr. Ramzan Ali Khan (1968-1975)

3. Mr. Lal Ji Khan (1990-1995)

4. Mrs. Anwari Begum (1996-2001)

5. Mr. Tajammul Hussain (2001-2006)

6. Mr. Hafiz Zubair Ahmed (2006-2011)

7. Mrs. Yasmin Bano (2012- 2017)

8. Mr. Hafiz Zubair Ahmed (Dec,2017-2023)

9. Mrs. Fara Begam (2023- till date)
