= Kheta Sarai =

- Town
- Location within Uttar Pradesh Location within India
- Coordinates: 25°49′N 82°42′E
- Country: India
- State: Uttar Pradesh
- District: Jaunpur

Government
  - Type: Local
  - Body: Municipal Nagar Panchayat

Population (2011)
  - Total: 19,438

Language
  - Official: Hindi
  - Additional official: Urdu
- Time zone: UTC+5:30 (IST)

Kheta Sarai is a town and a nagar panchayat in Jaunpur district of the Indian state of Uttar Pradesh.

== Demographics ==
As per 2011 Indian Census, Kheta Sarai had a total population of 19,438, of which 9,965 were males and 9,473 were females. Population within the age group of 0 to 6 years was 2,956, which is 15.21% of total population. Female sex ratio is of 951 against state average of 912. Moreover, child sex ratio in Khetasarai is around 979. The total number of literates in Kheta Sarai was 11,902, which constituted 61.2% of the population with male literacy of 67.4% and female literacy of 54.7%. The effective literacy rate of 7+ population of Kheta Sarai was 72.2%, of which male literacy rate was 79.3% and female literacy rate was 64.7%. The Scheduled Castes and Scheduled Tribes population was 2,487 and 3 respectively. Kheta Sarai had 2,641 households in 2011.
