= Khargupur =

- Town
- Location in Uttar Pradesh, India Khargupur (India)
- Coordinates: 27.38°N 81.98°E
- Country: India
- State: Uttar Pradesh
- District: Gonda
- Elevation: 110 m (360 ft)

Population (2001)
  - Total: 8,905

Languages
  - Official: Hindi
- Time zone: UTC+5:30 (IST)
- Vehicle registration: UP
- Website: up.gov.in

Khargupur is a town and a nagar panchayat in Gonda district in the Indian state of Uttar Pradesh.

== Geography ==
Khargupur is located at 27.38°N 81.98°E. It has an average elevation of 110 metres (360 feet).

== Demographics ==
As of 2001 India census, Khargupur had a population of 8,905. Males constitute 53% of the population and females 47%. Khargupur has an average literacy rate of 48%, lower than the national average of 59.5%: male literacy is 57%, and female literacy is 37%. In Khargupur, 16% of the population is under 6 years of age.
