= Ghosia Bazar =

- Town
- Location in Uttar Pradesh, India
- Coordinates: 25°16′N 82°33′E
- Country: India
- State: Uttar Pradesh
- District: Bhadohi

Population (2001)
  - Total: 15,778

Languages
  - Official: Hindi
- Time zone: UTC+5:30 (IST)
- Postal code: 221301

Ghosia Bazar is a town and a nagar panchayat in Bhadohi district in the Indian state of Uttar Pradesh. It is also known as Indian Carpets Hub. Ghosia is the most developed place in Sant Ravidas Nagar, where the huge amount of Carpets are manufactured and exported abroad. Major population of Ghosia is engaged in Carpets business.

== Demographics ==
As of 2001 India census, Ghosia Bazar had a population of 15,778. Males constitute 53% of the population and females 47%. Ghosia Bazar has an average literacy rate of 38%, lower than the national average of 59.5%: male literacy is 46%, and female literacy is 29%. In Ghosia Bazar, 20% of the population is under 6 years of age.
