= Sewalkhas =

Human settlement in Meerut district, Meerut division, Uttar Pradesh, India

Sewalkhas Siwal Khas
- Town
- Location in Uttar Pradesh, India Sewalkhas (India)
- Coordinates: 28.938007°N 77.528865°E
- Country: India
- State: Uttar Pradesh
- District: Meerut

Population (2001)
  - Total: 24,882

Languages
  - Official: Hindi
- Time zone: UTC+5:30 (IST)
- Vehicle registration: UP
- Website: up.gov.in

Siwalkhas is a town and a Nagar Panchayat in Meerut district in the Indian state of Uttar Pradesh.

== Demographics ==
Sewalkhas is a Nagar Panchayat city in district of Meerut, Uttar Pradesh. The Sewalkhas city is divided into 14 wards for which elections are held every 5 years. The Sewalkhas Nagar Panchayat has population of 24,882 of which 13,073 are males while 11,809 are females as per the 2011 Indian census

As of the 2001 Indian census, the population of children ages of 0-6 is 3,937 which is 21.35% of total population of Sewalkhas (NP). In Sewalkhas Nagar Panchayat, the female sex ratio is 903 against the state average of 912. The child sex ratio in Sewalkhas is around 900 compared to the Uttar Pradesh state average of 902. The literacy rate of Sewalkhas city is 56.74% lower than state average of 67.68%. In Sewalkhas, male literacy is around 66.52% while female literacy rate is 45.94%.

Sewalkhas Nagar Panchayat has total administration over 3,291 houses to which it supplies basic amenities like water and sewerage. It is also authorized to build roads within Nagar Panchayat limits, and impose taxes on properties under its jurisdiction.
