= Bugrasi =

- Town
- Location in Uttar Pradesh, India
- Coordinates: 28°37′26″N 78°08′15″E
- Country: India
- State: Uttar Pradesh
- District: Bulandshahr

Population (2011)
  - Total: 14,992

Languages
  - Official: Hindi, Urdu
- Time zone: UTC+5:30 (IST)

Bugrasi is a town or a Nagar panchayat in District Bulandshahr in the state of Uttar Pradesh, India. Bugrasi is about 8 km (5.0 mi) from Siyana. And 4 km (2.5 mi) from the Ganges (Ganga) river.

The town Bugrasi in the history of Basi, has a presidential key position from the first day and this town, which is called the center of political, religious, social and economic activities of Bara Basti, is located about 40 km north of City Bulandshahr towards the east.

Various weak and healthy traditions are known about its ancient history, but the most authentic and reliable tradition among them is that this town was the abode of Hindu Tyagi's before the arrival of the Pathans and was settled by Bagorao Tyagi.

== Demographics ==
As of 2011 India census, Bugrasi had a population of 14,992. Males constitute 53% of the population and females 47%. Bugrasi has an average literacy rate of 45%, lower than the national average of 59.5%; with male literacy of 57% and female literacy of 32%. 19% of the population is under 6 years of age.

== Education ==
Janta Inter College, Bugrasi, is famous as the top college of the district.

== Banking Service ==
CBS Branch of Allahabad Bank is available. MOBILE SERVICES-3g and 4g LTE n

Network of all major operators is available.
