= Usawan =

Usawan Ushnapuri
- Town
- Location in Uttar Pradesh, India
- Coordinates: 27°48′57″N 79°20′55″E
- Country: India
- State: Uttar Pradesh
- District: Badaun

Population (2011)
  - Total: 19,000(approx)

Languages
  - Official: Hindi
- Time zone: UTC+5:30 (IST)
- Postal code: 243631

Usawan is a town and a Nagar panchayat in Badaun District in the Indian state of Uttar Pradesh.

== Demographics ==
As of 2011 India census, Usawan had a population of 19,000 (approx). Males constitute 53% of the population and females 47%. Usawan has an average literacy rate of 61%, above than the national average of 59.5%: male literacy is 65%, and female literacy is 50%. In Usawan, 17% of the population is under 6 years of age.

It is situated on state highway-43 (Moradabad-farrkahbad Road).

There is no degree college in the town. There are only two or three Inter colleges in Usawan. It is one of the towns of Budaun District.

Schools in Usawan

1-Mahatma Gandhi Inter college

2-Swami Dhoom Risi Inter college

3-Bal Niketan Bal Vidhyalay

4-English medium girls higher secondary school

5-Govt school

6-Saraswati Shisu Mandir School (Run by RSS family)

7-Arya Samaj School Gura Road Usawan

8-Disha Convent Public School

9-AVSR Group Of Education Usawan

Hospital

Govt PHC. Hospital
