= Jyoti Khuria =

- Town
- Location in Uttar Pradesh, India
- Coordinates: 27°17′55″N 78°56′21″E
- Country: India
- State: Uttar Pradesh
- District: Mainpuri

Population (2001)
  - Total: 4,945

Languages
  - Official: Hindi
- Time zone: UTC+5:30 (IST)

Jyoti Khuria is a town and a nagar panchayat in Mainpuri district in the Indian state of Uttar Pradesh.

== Demographics ==
As of 2001 India census, Jyoti Khuria had a population of 4,945. Males constitute 54% of the population and females 46%. Jyoti Khuria has an average literacy rate of 63%, higher than the national average of 59.5%: male literacy is 73%, and female literacy is 51%. In Jyoti Khuria, 18% of the population is under 6 years of age.
