= Shishgarh =

Shishgarh ShishMahal
- Town
- Nickname: Sweet City
- Location in Uttar Pradesh, India Shishgarh (India)
- Coordinates: 28.72°N 79.32°E
- Country: India
- State: Uttar Pradesh
- District: Bareilly
- Founder: Shershah (Tale by oldie)

Government
  - Type: Municipal corporation
  - Body: Nagar panchayat

Area
  - Total: 10 km^{2} (3.9 sq mi)
  - Rank: Largest town in tahseel meerganj
- Elevation: 174 m (571 ft)

Population (2011)
  - Total: 753,815
  - Density: 75,000/km^{2} (200,000/sq mi)

Languages
  - Official: Hindi
- Time zone: UTC+5:30 (IST)
- Postal code: 243505
- Vehicle registration: UP 25
- Website: up.gov.in

Shishgarh is a town and a nagar panchayat in Bareilly district in the Indian state of Uttar Pradesh.

== Geography ==
Shishgarh is located at 28.72°N 79.32°E. It has an average elevation of 174 metres (570 feet).

== Demographics ==
The Shishgarh Nagar Panchayat has population of 758,195 of which 598,468 are males while 268,347 are females as reported in the Census India 2011.

The population of children aged 0-6 is 4345 which is 16.83% of total population of Shishgarh (NP). In Shishgarh Nagar Panchayat, the female sex ratio is 917 against state average of 912. Moreover, the child sex ratio in Shishgarh is around 912 compared to Uttar Pradesh state average of 902. The literacy rate of Shishgarh city is 37.36% lower than state average of 67.68%. In Shishgarh, male literacy is around 48.61% while the female literacy rate is 25.10%.
