= Bhojpur Dharampur =

- Town
- Location in Uttar Pradesh, India Bhojpur Dharampur (India)
- Coordinates: 28°57′41″N 78°50′22″E
- Country: India
- State: Uttar Pradesh
- District: Moradabad

Population (2011)
  - Total: 31,395

Languages
  - Official: Hindi
- Time zone: UTC+5:30 (IST)
- Postal code: 244402
- Vehicle registration: UP 21
- Website: up.gov.in

Bhojpur Dharampur is a town and a nagar panchayat in Moradabad district in the state of Uttar Pradesh, India.

== Demographics ==
As of 2001 India census, Bhojpur Dharampur had a population of 30,395. Males constitute 53% of the population and females 47%. Bhojpur Dharampur has an average literacy rate of 42%, lower than the national average of 59.5%; with male literacy of 50% and female literacy of 30%. 21% of the population is under 6 years of age.
