= Swamibagh =

Soamibagh Soamibagh
- Town
- Location in Uttar Pradesh, India Soamibagh (India)
- Coordinates: 27.222731°N 78.009109°E
- Country: India
- State: Uttar Pradesh
- District: Agra

Population (2001)
  - Total: 1,909

Language
  - Official: Hindi
  - Additional official: Urdu
- Time zone: UTC+5:30 (IST)
- Vehicle registration: UP
- Website: up.gov.in

Soamibagh is a town and a nagar panchayat in Agra district in the Indian state of Uttar Pradesh.

== Demographics ==
As of 2001 India census, Swamibagh had a population of 1,909. Males constitute 52% of the population and females 48%. Swamibagh has an average literacy rate of 80%, higher than the national average of 59.5%: male literacy is 82%, and female literacy is 77%. In Swamibagh, 9% of the population is under 6 years of age.
