= Sewarhi =

Sewarhi Tamkuhi Raj
- Town
- Location in Uttar Pradesh, India
- Coordinates: 26°43′28.5″N 84°13′31.5″E
- Country: India
- State: Uttar Pradesh
- District: Kushinagar

Population (2011)
  - Total: 23,077

Languages
  - Official: Hindi
- Time zone: UTC+5:30 (IST)

Sewarhi is a town and a nagar panchayat in Kushinagar district on the banks of the river Gandak in the Indian state of Uttar Pradesh.

== Demographics ==
As of 2011 India census, Sewarhi had a population of 23077. Males constitute 53% of the population and females 47%. Sewarhi has an average literacy rate of 71.72%: male literacy is 77.54%, and female literacy is 65.82%. In Sewarhi, 14% of the population is under 6 years of age.
