= Tondi Fatehpur =

Todi Fatehpur
- Town
- Location in Uttar Pradesh, India Todi Fatehpur (India)
- Coordinates: 25.470244°N 79.109703°E
- Country: India
- State: Uttar Pradesh
- District: Jhansi

Population (2001)
  - Total: 10,099

Languages
  - Official: Hindi
- Time zone: UTC+5:30 (IST)
- Vehicle registration: UP
- Website: up.gov.in

Tondi Fatehpur is a town and a nagar panchayat in Jhansi district in the Indian state of Uttar Pradesh.

== Demographics ==
As of the 2001 Census of India, Tondi Fatehpur had a population of 10,099. Males constituted 54% of the population and females 46%. Tondi Fatehpur had an average literacy rate of 48%, lower than the national average of 59.5%: male literacy was 62%, and female literacy 31%. In Tondi Fatehpur, 17% of the population was under 6 years of age.
