= Gohand =

- Town
- Location in Uttar Pradesh, India Gohand (India)
- Coordinates: 25.7°N 79.55°E
- Country: India
- State: Uttar Pradesh
- District: Hamirpur
- Elevation: 146 m (479 ft)

Population (2011)
  - Total: 7,503
  - Density: 3,751.5/km^{2} (9,716/sq mi)

Languages
  - Official: Hindi
- Time zone: UTC+5:30 (IST)
- Vehicle registration: UP
- Website: up.gov.in

Gohand is a town and a nagar panchayat in Hamirpur district in the Indian state of Uttar Pradesh. It is situated on UP-SH-21 15 km from Rath & 40 km from Orai

== Geography ==
Gohand is located at 25.7°N 79.55°E. It has an average elevation of 146 metres (479 feet).

== Demographics ==
As of 2001 India census, Gohand had a population of 7,503. Males constitute 55% of the population and females 45%. Gohand has an average literacy rate of 68.78%, lower than the national average of 74.04%: male literacy is 83.24%, and female literacy is 51.53%. In Gohand, 11.5% of the population is under 6 years of age.
