= Bahuwa =

- Town
- Location in Uttar Pradesh, India Bahuwa (India)
- Coordinates: 25°51′N 80°38′E
- Country: India
- State: Uttar Pradesh
- District: Fatehpur

Population (2001)
  - Total: 9,312

Languages
  - Official: Hindi
- Time zone: UTC+5:30 (IST)
- Vehicle registration: UP
- Website: up.gov.in

Bahuwa is a town and a nagar panchayat in Fatehpur district in the state of Uttar Pradesh, India.

== Demographics ==
As of 2001 India census, Bahuwa had a population of 9312. Males constitute 53% of the population and females 47%. Bahuwa has an average literacy rate of 53%, lower than the national average of 59.5%; with 62% of the males and 38% of females literate. 15% of the population is under 6 years of age.
