= Kotra, Uttar Pradesh =

Town in Uttar Pradesh, India

- Town
- Location in Uttar Pradesh, India Kotra, Uttar Pradesh (India)
- Coordinates: 25.82°N 79.32°E
- Country: India
- State: Uttar Pradesh
- District: Jalaun
- Elevation: 136 m (446 ft)

Population (2001)
  - Total: 8,078

Languages
  - Official: Hindi
- Time zone: UTC+5:30 (IST)
- Vehicle registration: UP
- Website: up.gov.in

Kotra is a town and a nagar panchayat in Jalaun district in the Indian state of Uttar Pradesh.

== Geography ==
Kotra is located at 25.82°N 79.32°E. It has an average elevation of 136 metres (446 feet). Kotra is near Holy Betwa River. The population is over 10,000.

== Demographics ==
As of the 2001 Census of India, Kotra had a population of 8,078. Males constitute 54% of the population and females 46%. Kotra has an average literacy rate of 56%, lower than the national average of 59.5%: male literacy is 68%, and female literacy is 43%. In Kotra, 16% of the population is under 6 years of age.80% population depended on krishi
