= Bilaspur, Gautam Buddh Nagar =

Bilaspur, Gautam Buddh Nagar Munendera Kandere
- Town
- Location in Uttar Pradesh, India
- Coordinates: 28°24′20″N 77°37′36″E
- Country: India
- State: Uttar Pradesh
- District: Gautam Buddha Nagar

Government
  - Type: Municipal corporation
- Elevation: 144 m (472 ft)

Population (2001)
  - Total: 7,478

Language
  - Official: Hindi
  - Additional official: Urdu
- Time zone: UTC+5:30 (IST)

Bilaspur is a town and a nagar panchayat in Gautam Buddha Nagar district in the state of Uttar Pradesh, India. This town is 400 years old and was once a collection center of revenue. Monuments continue to be constructed in the town by Pashtun & British citizens.

== Demographics ==
As of 2011 India census, Bilaspur had a population of 15,500. Males constitute 53% of the population and females 47%. Bilaspur has an average literacy rate of 67%, lower than the national average of 70.5%; with male literacy of 58% and female literacy of 38%. 18% of the population is under 6 years of age.
