= Khiwai =

Coordinates: 29°06′N 77°28′E

Khiwai is a town and nagar panchayat situated in the Saroorpur khurd Block of sardhana tehsil Meerut District in Uttar Pradesh, India. It is located at a distance of 7.916 kilometres from the Mandal headquarters at Sarurpur Khurd, and is 26.16 kilometres from the district headquarters at Meerut. The population, according to the 2011 Census of India was 21,049 and the village is largely Muslim.

At the entrance of Khiwai town is a Mata Shakumbhari Devi Temple, one government school adjacent to it and other one on the other side of crossroad of Khiwai's entrance. Although a large number of population is Sunni Muslims having roots of Rajput Hindu and called as "Raangad"; But there are only Hindu Rajput families at the outskirts of Town. 90% of Hindu Rajputs are of Chauhan Dynasty

== History ==
Khiwai was founded in 1627 by Rana Kherati Singh, when the 12 villages surrounding Khiwai were ruled by Baloch Muslims. Rana Kherati Singh and his brothers Hare Singh, Naurang Singh, Udai Singh, Kukrat Singh, Sher Singh, and Jai Singh were approximately 8-10 sons of Rana Neem Chand. They came from GarhiHarsaru, now located in the Gurgaon district of Haryana. Together, they seized the 12 villages surrounding Khiwai from the Baloch Muslims and built a temple for their family deity, Shakumbari Devi, outside Khiwai.
