= Gulariya, Uttar Pradesh =

Gulariya
- Town
- Location in India Gulariya (India)
- Coordinates: 27°13′31″N 79°34′45″E
- State: Uttar Pradesh
- District: Badaun

Population (2001)
  - Total: 4,886

Languages
  - Official: Hindi
- Time zone: UTC+5:30 (IST)

Gulariya is a town and a nagar panchayat in Badaun district in the Indian state of Uttar Pradesh.

== Demographics ==
As of the 2001 Census of India, Gulariya had a population of 4886. Males constitute 54% of the population and females 46%. Gulariya has an average literacy rate of 44%, lower than the national average of 59.5%: male literacy is 51%, and female literacy is 35%. In Gulariya, 17% of the population is under 6 years of age. There are two inter colleges in the town. Now the literacy rate has been increased. There is an English medium school named Vindhyan English School and many others. Agriculture and brick industries are the major occupations in Gulariya. Tara Devi is the current chairperson of the town.
