= Rudayan, Budaun =

Rudayan
- Town
- Location in Uttar Pradesh, India
- Coordinates: 27°43′42″N 78°04′14″E
- Country: India
- State: Uttar Pradesh
- District: Badaun

Government
  - Type: indian government

Population (2001)
  - Total: 7,130

Languages
  - Official: Hindi
- Time zone: UTC+5:30 (IST)

Rudayan is a town and a nagar panchayat in Badaun district in the Indian state of Uttar Pradesh.

== Demographics ==
As of 2001 India census, Rudayan had a population of 7,130. Males constitute 53% of the population and females 47%. Rudayan has an average literacy rate of 38%, lower than the national average of 59.5%: male literacy is 49%, and female literacy is 25%. In Rudayan, 21% of the population is under 6 years of age.
