= Uska, Uttar Pradesh =

Town in Uttar Pradesh, India

Uska Bazar Uska
- Town Area
- Nickname: Uska
- Location in Siddharthnagar, Uttar Pradesh, India Uska Bazar (India)
- Coordinates: 27°12′N 83°07′E
- Country: India
- State: Uttar Pradesh
- District: Siddharthnagar district

Government
  - Type: Democracy
  - Body: Nagar Panchayat

Languages
  - Official: Hindi
- Time zone: UTC+5:30 (IST)
- PIN: 272208
- Vehicle registration: UP 55
- Nearest city: Gorakhpur
- Website: up.gov.in

Uska Bazar is a Nagar Panchayat and a small developing town in Siddharthnagar district of the Uttar Pradesh province of northern India, near the border with Nepal.
