= Bardar, Raebareli =

Bardar
- Village
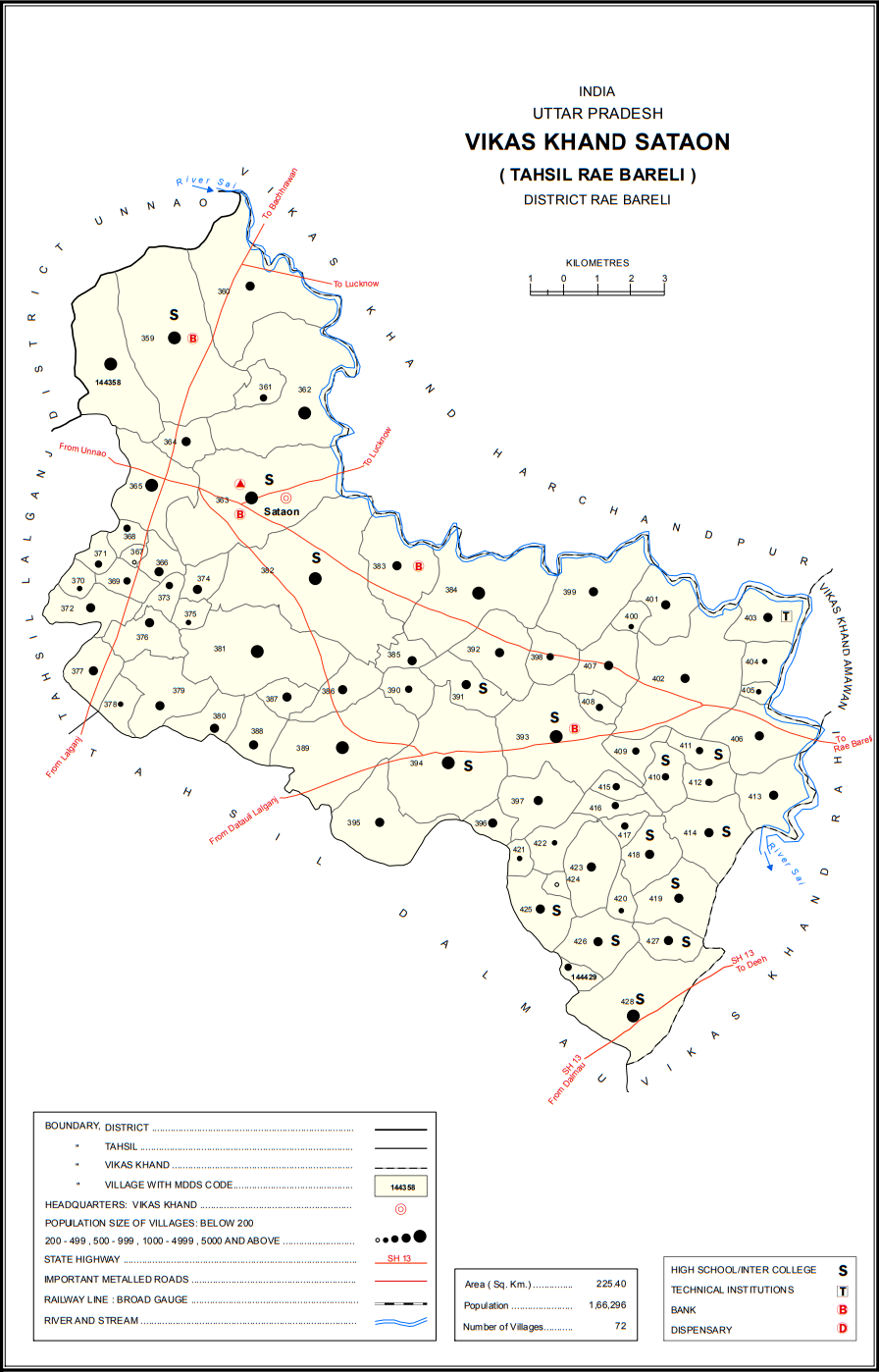
- Map showing Bardar (#362) in Sataon CD block

- Location in Uttar Pradesh, India
- Coordinates: 26.322262°N 81.059225°E
- Country India: India
- State: Uttar Pradesh
- District: Raebareli

Area
  - Total: 10.206 km^{2} (3.941 sq mi)

Population (2011)
  - Total: 6,557
  - Density: 642.5/km^{2} (1,664/sq mi)

Languages
  - Official: Hindi
- Time zone: UTC+5:30 (IST)
- Vehicle registration: UP-35

Bardar is a village located in Sataon block of Rae Bareli district, Uttar Pradesh, India. It is located 26 km from Raebareli, the district headquarters. As of 2011, its population is 6,557 in 1,291 households. It has two primary schools and no healthcare facilities.

The 1961 census recorded Bardar as comprising 13 hamlets, with a total population of 2,528 people (1,303 male and 1,225 female), in 470 households and 418 physical houses. The area of the village was given as 2,481 acres. It had a post office at that point, as well as the following small industrial establishments: 3 grain mills, 4 producers of edible fats and/or oils, 1 clothing manufacturer, and 1 maker of jewellery and/or precious metal items.

The 1981 census recorded Bardar as having a population of 3,747 people, in 659 households, and having an area of 1,028.75 hectares. The main staple foods were given as wheat and rice.
