= Amila, Uttar Pradesh =

Amila
- Town
- Location in Uttar Pradesh, India Amila (India)
- Coordinates: 26.189043°N 83.066994°E
- Country: India
- State: Uttar Pradesh
- District: Mau

Population (2011)
  - Total: 5,234

Languages
  - Official: Hindi
- Time zone: UTC+5:30 (IST)
- Vehicle registration: UP-54

Amila is a town and nagar panchayat in Mau district in the state of Uttar Pradesh, India.

== Demographics ==
At the 2001 India census, Amila had a population of 4,764. Males constituted 51% of the population and females 49%. Amila had an average literacy rate of 66%, higher than the national average of 59.5%; with 57% of the males and 43% of females literate. 16% of the population was under 6 years of age.

== Language ==
Common spoken languages are Bhojpuri and Hindi
