= Dhaura Tanda =

- Town
- Location in Uttar Pradesh, India
- Coordinates: 28°34′35″N 79°25′00″E
- Country: India
- State: Uttar Pradesh
- District: Bareilly
- Established: 1750

Government
  - Type: Chairman
  - Body: Nagar panchayat

Population (2014)
  - Total: 20,494
- Demonym: Dhaurbi/Dhaunra

Languages
  - Official: Hindi
- Time zone: UTC+5:30 (IST)
- PIN: 243202

Dhaura Tanda is a town and a nagar panchayat in Bareilly district in the state of Uttar Pradesh, India. It is situated 25 km from Bareilly in the west. The Ram Navami Mela fair has been held here annually since 1951.

== Demographics ==
As of 2001 India census, Dhaura Tanda had a population of 20,494. Males constituted 52% of the population and females 48%. Dhaura Tanda had an average literacy rate of 47%, lower than the national average of 59.5%: male literacy is 55% and, female literacy is 39%. In Dhaura Tanda, 20% of the population was under 6 years of age. Muslims make up the majority of the population.
