= Chilkana Sultanpur =

- Town
- Location in Uttar Pradesh, India Chilkana Sultanpur (India)
- Coordinates: 30°04′51″N 77°28′14″E
- Country: India
- State: Uttar Pradesh
- District: Saharanpur

Population (2016)
  - Total: 27,000

Languages
  - Official: Hindi, Urdu
- Time zone: UTC+5:30 (IST)
- Postal code: 247231
- Vehicle registration: UP11
- Website: up.gov.in

Chilkana Sultanpur is a town and a nagar panchayat in Saharanpur district in the state of Uttar Pradesh, India.

== Demographics ==
As of 2011 India census, Chilkana Sultanpur had a population of 19,501 of which 10,395 are males while 9,106 are females as per report released by Census India 2011. Child Sex Ratio in Chilkana Sultanpur is around 875 compared to Uttar Pradesh state average of 902. Literacy rate of Chilkana Sultanpur city is 66.94% lower than state average of 67.68%. In Chilkana Sultanpur, Male literacy is around 72.50% while female literacy rate is 60.60%. Population of Children with age of 0-6 is 3204 which is 16.43% of total population of Chilkana Sultanpur. Chilkana famous for its old temples and bala sundri mela. You can also find some old havelis here. Chilkana have some good schools like J.J.Inter college and NJ college.

Religions in Chilkana Sultanpur City
Religion	Percent
Muslims	66.17%
Hindus	31.92%
Christians	0.10%
Jains	1.68%
Others†	0.04%
Distribution of religions †Includes Sikhs (0.07%), Buddhists (<0.02%).

Field office of SANSAD (South Asian Network for Social & Agricultural Development) situated near shiv mandir to aware and improve the organic agricultural practices in the region.

Chilkana have average public transport facility.
