= Jhalu =

- Town
- Location in Uttar Pradesh, India Jhalu (India)
- Coordinates: 29.35°N 78.25°E
- Country: India
- State: Uttar Pradesh

Population (2014)
  - Total: 32,658

Languages
  - Official: Hindi Urdu
- Time zone: UTC+5:30 (IST)
- PIN: 246728
- Telephone code: 01342
- Vehicle registration: UP 20
- Website: up.gov.in

Jhalu is a town and a nagar panchayat in Bijnor district in the Indian state of Uttar Pradesh.

== Geography ==
Jhalu is located at 29.35°N 78.25°E. It has an average elevation of 225 metres (738 feet).

== Demographics ==
As of 2001 India census, Jhalu had a population of 18,701. Males constitute 52% of the population and females 48%. Jhalu has an average literacy rate of 76%, compared to the national average of 59.5%: male literacy is 53%, and female literacy is 38%. In Jhalu, 19% of the population is under 6 years of age.
