= Lalgopalganj =

- Town
- Location in Uttar Pradesh, India Lalgopalganj (India)
- Coordinates: 25°39′N 81°37′E
- Country: India
- State: Uttar Pradesh
- District: Prayagraj

Government
  - Type: Nagar panchayat

Area
  - Total: 5 km^{2} (1.9 sq mi)

Population (2011)
  - Total: 28,288
  - Density: 5,700/km^{2} (15,000/sq mi)

Language
  - Official: Hindi
  - Additional official: Urdu
- Time zone: UTC+5:30 (IST)
- 229413: 229413
- Website: nplalgopalganj.org

Lalgopalganj is a town and a nagar panchayat in Prayagraj district in Indian state of Uttar Pradesh.

== Transport ==
Lalgopalganj is well connected by road through National Highway 731A (NH 731A), which links the town with Prayagraj, Pratapgarh, Raebareli and Lucknow. Local transportation is provided by buses, taxis, auto-rickshaws and e-rickshaws.

The town is served by Lalgopalganj railway station, which lies on the Prayagraj–Lucknow railway route and provides rail connectivity to nearby cities and towns.

== Economy ==
Lalgopalganj serves as a local commercial centre for the surrounding rural areas of Prayagraj district. Agriculture forms the backbone of the local economy, while wholesale and retail trade, small businesses, transport services, and other commercial activities contribute significantly to employment. The town's markets provide agricultural inputs, consumer goods, construction materials, and other essential commodities to nearby villages.

== Famous For ==
Lalgopalganj famous for a notable centre for the Muslim artisanal production of sacred red-and-yellow ritual threads and decorative deity garments (chunari) used in Hindu festivals and Dargah.

Also famous for Madarsa Habibia Islamia established in 1909 is a religious educational institute. It serves the community as a centre for Islamic learning and hosts annual religious event such as the Roohani Conference.

== Nearby Attractions ==
Shringverpur Dham is located about 5 km south of Lalgopalganj in Prayagraj district. The village is an important religious and archaeological site and is traditionally identified as the capital of Nishadraj (King Guha) mentioned in the Ramayana. According to Hindu tradition, Lord Rama, Sita and Lakshmana stayed at Shringverpur during their exile before crossing the River Ganga with the assistance of Nishadraj. Archaeological excavations at the site have revealed the remains of an ancient settlement and structures associated with Shringi Rishi. Shringverpur has been included in tourism promotion initiatives under the Ramayana Circuit and attracts pilgrims and visitors throughout the year.

== Education & Healthcare ==
Lalgopalganj has several government and private educational institutions offering primary, secondary and senior secondary education. Students also have access to colleges and universities in Prayagraj for higher education.

Healthcare services in the town are provided through government and private medical facilities, including primary healthcare centres, clinics, pharmacies and diagnostic centres. Residents also access specialized medical services at hospitals in Prayagraj.

== Demographics ==
As of 2011 Indian Census, Lalgopalganj had a total population of 28,288, of which 14,570 were males and 13,718 were females. Population within the age group of 0 to 6 years was 4,326. The total number of literates in Lalgopalganj was 15,734, which constituted 55.6% of the population with male literacy of 62.0% and female literacy of 48.8%. The effective literacy rate of 7+ population of Lalgopalganj was 65.7%, of which male literacy rate was 73.1% and female literacy rate was 57.7%. The Scheduled Castes and Scheduled Tribes population was 4,303 and 7 respectively. Lalgopalganj had 4525 households in 2011.

As of 2001 India census, Lalgopalganj had a population of 22,739. Males constitute 53% of the population and females 47%. Lalgopalganj has an average literacy rate of 50%, lower than the national average of 59.5%: male literacy is 59%, and female literacy is 41%. In Lalgopalganj, 18% of the population is under 6 years of age.

== Administration ==
Lalgopalganj has total 15 wards namely, Nindaura East, Nindaura West, Nindaura North, Nindaura South, Nindaura Middle, Nindaura South-West, Nindaura South-East, Ibrahimpur, Daniyalpur khas, Daniyalpur South-West, Rawan/Ahladganj, Khanjahanpur, Khanjahanpur North, Umraoganj, Imamganj.

Election : Nagar panchayat- 2023: Total casting vote 29669 (male 15315 & female voter 14354 )
