= Umri, Jalaun =

Umri
- Town
- Location in Uttar Pradesh, India Umri (India)
- Coordinates: 26°20′N 79°15′E
- Country: India
- State: Uttar Pradesh
- District: Jalaun

Government
  - Type: democratic
  - Body: nagar panchayt

Population (2001)
  - Total: 8,816

Languages
  - Official: Hindi
- Time zone: UTC+5:30 (IST)
- Vehicle registration: UP
- Website: up.gov.in

Umri is a town and a nagar panchayat in Jalaun district in the Indian state of Uttar Pradesh.

== Demographics ==
As of 2001 India census, Umri had a population of 8,816. Males constitute 54% of the population and females 46%. Umri has an average literacy rate of 60%, higher than the national average of 59.5%: male literacy is 70%, and female literacy is 48%. In Umri, 16% of the population is under 6 years of age.
