= Khanpur, Uttar Pradesh =

Town in Uttar Pradesh, India. The postal code of Khanpur is 203405

Khanpur, Uttar Pradesh Gantu
- Town
- Location in Uttar Pradesh, India Khanpur, Uttar Pradesh (India)
- Coordinates: 28.53°N 78.05°E
- Country: India
- State: Uttar Pradesh
- District: Bulandshahr
- Elevation: 207 m (679 ft)

Population (2011)
  - Total: 17,247

Languages
  - Official: Hindi
- Time zone: UTC+5:30 (IST)
- Postal code: 203405
- Vehicle registration: UP 13 XX XXXX
- Website: up.gov.in

Khanpur is a town and a Nagar Panchayat in Bulandshahr district in the Indian state of Uttar Pradesh.

== Demographics ==
Khanpur Nagar Panchayat had a population of 17,247 (8,942 males and 8,305 females) in the 2011 census. Children between the ages of 0 and 6 make up 16% of the total population. The literacy rate of Khanpur city is 55%, lower than state average of 68%. The male literacy rate is around 66%, while the female literacy rate is 43%.

Khanpur city is divided into 12 wards for which elections are held every 5 years. The Khanpur Nagar Panchayat administers over 2,589 houses, to which it supplies basic amenities like water and sewerage. It is also authorize to build roads within the Nagar Panchayat limits and impose taxes on properties coming under its jurisdiction.

== Pin code of Khanpur ==
Postal code of Khanpur is 203405
