= Agwanpur =

Coordinates: 28°29′N 77°20′E

Agwanpur is a village panchayat in Barh subdivision in Patna district of Bihar, India.

== Population ==
The population of Agwanpur panchayat was 8,277 in 2001. The male population was 4,383 and the female population was 3,894. Of these, 3,401 were literate.
