= Risia Bazar =

- Town
- Location in Uttar Pradesh, India Risia Bazar (India)
- Coordinates: 27°57′14.12″N 80°59′53.47″E
- Country: India
- State: Uttar Pradesh
- District: Bahraich
- Named for: rasiya peoples

Population (2001)
  - Total: 11,128

Languages
  - Official: Hindi, Urdu, Awadhi
- Time zone: UTC+5:30 (IST)
- Vehicle registration: UP - 40
- Website: up.gov.in

Risia Bazar is a town and a nagar panchayat in Bahraich district in the Indian state of Uttar Pradesh.

== Demographics ==
As of 2001 India census, Risia Bazar had a population of 11,128. Males constitute 52% of the population and females 48%. Risia Bazar has an average literacy rate of 43%, lower than the national average of 59.5%: male literacy is 49%, and female literacy is 36%. In Risia Bazar, 19% of the population is under 6 years of age.
