= Sidhpura =

Sidhpura Sidhpura sirpura
- Town
- Nickname: Sirpura
- Location in Uttar Pradesh, India
- Coordinates: 27.632168°N 78.867993°E
- Country: India
- State: Uttar Pradesh
- District: kasganj

Government
  - Type: Nagar Panchayat
  - Body: Chairman
- Elevation: 238 m (781 ft)

Population (2011)
  - Total: 15,740

Languages
  - Official: Hindi
- Time zone: UTC+5:30 (IST)
- Postal code: 207246
- Vehicle registration: UP87

Sidhpura is a town and a nagar panchayat in Kasganj district in the Indian state of Uttar Pradesh. It is situated 23 km from Etah in East North-East direction and 31.7 km away from Kasganj in East.

== Geography ==
Sidhpura is located at 27.63°N 78.88°E. It has an average elevation of 238 metres (551 feet).

== Demographics ==
As of 2001 India census, Sidhpura had a population of 12,996. Males constitute 53% of the population and females 47%. Sidhpura has an average literacy rate of 59%, lower than the national average of 59.5%: male literacy is 60%, and female literacy is 44%. In Sidhpura, 19% of the population is under 6 years of age.

== Connectivity ==
Sidhpura is connected with cities like Etah, Kasganj, Patiyali, Dhumri, Ganj dundwara via road. There is no railway line.
