= Amanpur =

- Town
- Location in Uttar Pradesh, India Amanpur (India)
- Coordinates: 27.72°N 78.75°E
- Country: India
- State: Uttar Pradesh
- District: Kasganj
- Elevation: 171 m (561 ft)

Population (2011)
  - Total: 12,000

Languages
  - Official: Hindi
- Time zone: UTC+5:30 (IST)
- PIN: 207241
- Vehicle registration: UP
- Website: up.gov.in

Amanpur is a town and a nagar panchayat in Kasganj district in the state of Uttar Pradesh, India.

== Demographics ==
As of 2001 India census, Amanpur had a population of 9117. Males constitute 52% of the population and females 48%. Amanpur has an average literacy rate of 49%, lower than the national average of 59.5%; with 61% of the males and 39% of females literate. 20% of the population is under 6 years of age. Now It belongs to newly created district Kasganj.
