= Mendu =

- Town
- Location in Uttar Pradesh, India
- Coordinates: 27°36′55″N 78°06′43″E
- Country: India
- State: Uttar Pradesh
- District: Hathras

Population (2001)
  - Total: 12,001

Languages
  - Official: Hindi
- Time zone: UTC+5:30 (IST)

Mendu is a town and a nagar panchayat in Hathras district in the Indian state of Uttar Pradesh.

== Demographics ==
As of 2001 India census, Mendu had a population of 12,002. Males constitute 54% of the population and females 46%. Mendu has an average literacy rate of 47%, lower than the national average of 59.5%: male literacy is 57%, and female literacy is 34%. In Mendu, 19% of the population is under 6 years of age.
