= Kursath, Hardoi =

Kursath
- Town
- Location in Uttar Pradesh, India
- Coordinates: 27.549068°N 80.283279°E
- Country: India
- State: Uttar Pradesh
- District: Hardoi

Population (2001)
  - Total: 5,654

Languages
  - Official: Hindi
- Time zone: UTC+5:30 (IST)

Kursath is a town and a nagar panchayat in Hardoi district in the Indian state of Uttar Pradesh. It has ten wards named: Jawahar Nagar, Azad Nagar, Gauri Nagar, Pant Nagar, Rajendra Nagar, Patel Nagar, Gandhi Nagar, Subhash Nagar, Ram Nagar and Ashok Nagar.

== Demographics ==
As of 2001 India census, Kursath had a population of 5,654. Males constitute 54% of the population and females 46%. Kursath has an average literacy rate of 62%, higher than the national average of 59.5%: male literacy is 70%, and female literacy is 53%. In Kursath, 17% of the population is under 6 years of age.
