= Kunwargaon =

- Town
- Location in Uttar Pradesh, India
- Coordinates: 28°10′20.5″N 79°08′32.5″E
- Country: India
- State: Uttar Pradesh
- District: Badaun

Population (2011)
  - Total: 8,053

Languages
  - Official: Hindi
- Time zone: UTC+5:30 (IST)
- Vehicle registration: UP 24

Kunwargaon is a town and a nagar panchayat in Badaun district in the Indian state of Uttar Pradesh.

== Demographics ==
As of 2011 India census, Kunwargaon had a population of 8,053. Where 4320 are males and 3733 are female as per Census India 2011 report. Kunwargaon has an average literacy rate of 46%, lower than the national average of 59.5%: male literacy is 56%, and female literacy is 35%. In Kunwargaon, 19% of the population is under 6 years of age.
