= Sarai Aquil =

- Town
- Location in Uttar Pradesh, India Sarai Aquil (India)
- Coordinates: 25°23′N 81°31′E
- Country: India
- State: Uttar Pradesh
- District: Kaushambi

Population (2001)
  - Total: 15,719

Languages
  - Official: Hindi
- Time zone: UTC+5:30 (IST)
- Vehicle registration: UP
- Website: up.gov.in

Sarai Aquil is a town and a nagar panchayat in Kaushambi district, Uttar Pradesh, an Indian state.

== Demographics ==
In 2001, the Indian census recorded that Sarai Akil had a population of 15,719. Males comprise 54% of the population and females 46%. Sarai Akil had an average literacy rate of 48%, which is lower than the national average of 59.5%: male literacy was 55% and female literacy was 39%. Additionally, 16% of the population in Sarai Aquil were children under 6 years.
