= Walidpur =

Walidpur Bhira
- Town Area
- Location in Uttar Pradesh, India Walidpur Bhira (India)
- Coordinates: 26°03′30″N 83°22′40″E
- Country: India
- State: Uttar Pradesh
- District: Mau district

Population (2026)
  - Total: 50,000

Languages
  - Official: Hindi
- Time zone: UTC+5:30 (IST)
- Postal code: 276405

Walidpur Bhira is a village in Mau district, Uttar Pradesh, India, and has a population of around 50,000 as of 2026. It has a mixed community with 60% Muslims and 40% Hindus.

== History ==
The village Walidpur Bhira is approximately 600 years old. It is an Indian village located in Muhammadabad Gohna Tehsil, Mau district of Uttar Pradesh.

As per Census 2011 information, the village code of Walidpur Bhira is 276405. It is a historical village. There are various great personalities belong to this village. Now, the Village has been developed into a Town Area and has many facilities as compared to some 20 years back. The Maqbara of Maulana Kamil Saheb and Sufi Jan Saheb are built have here which accompanied with their ancestral house. The annual Urs celebrations are held here. Shah mohd Izhar Ahmad is the sajjadah nashin of Dargah of maulana kamil sahab &Sufi sahab. History of this town area comes from Sufism period because some story came from generation to generation which belong to that era, like a ghost was living in this area who do not allow anyone to live in this area but entry of Sufism make this place suitable for people to live here so this qasba was also called by walipur some inscriptions was also seen as written as walipur Bhira. In sultanat period in which jagirdari system was practised, Sultan Ibrahim shah sharqi gave this place Shaikh Mohammad bin khizr farooqui's son Moshaiyed to rule over this place in which included Walidpur, Bhira, etc. From this family there are many people lived like in walidpur Bhira in which some renowned people born such as Haji Shah Abul kahir, Shah Abul Gaush Garam Diwan and Maulana abu ishaq who are famous for their knowledge.

Mulla Mahmud jaunpuri who was best known for their contribution in philosophy, their grave was situated in this area, according to Islamic scholar their philosophy book was famous among English and Arabic philosophers, etc. There are many Madersa, temples, Majid situated. In 1909 a Madersa was founded by Miya ji Ziyaul Allah today that Madersa is named Noor ul Islam i.e. light of Islam, In starting all, caste and creed people like to study here, but nowadays there are many primary schools, Madersa are running like Madersa Jamia Rahmania, Madersa Kamiliya, Madersa Mansurul uloom, Madersa Rahimia, Madersa Talimul quraan, BSRK, BRK, Arjun girls Degree College, kids Harbour international school etc. Now the qasba is developing fastly. The main occupations of this area is weaving (Bunayi), handloom, power loom practised, nowadays some people are going Saudi Arabia, Kuwait, Oman for their livelihood. There are many personalities appeared as gem which mentioned above such as Maulana Kamil sahab, Sufi Jaan Mohammad sahab, Mulla Jaunpuri, garam diwan, etc. The first chairman selected by people was Shamima Ali who played a major role to enlight development in walidpur, now this qasba is progressing day by day under the guidance of elected candidates, Madhav Das baba is a famous temple among Hindu culture which is situated Mathiya near primary school, according to Hindu belief system on Madhav Das baba temple every oath/wish become fulfill, it is a best example of unity, some famous dishes belong to this qasba that is imerti, which is taken by neighbouring city people like Mau, azamgarh varansi, Muradabad, Aligadh, Lucknow, etc.

== Geography ==
Walidpur Bhira is a town area situated in Mohammadabad Gohana Tehsil, Mau District, Uttar Pradesh, India, with the postal code 276405. The town lies on the banks of the Tamsa River, which borders it on multiple sides, providing a natural geographic boundary. Administratively, it is part of the Mohammadabad Gohna Assembly constituency (355) and the Ghosi Parliamentary constituency (18).

Ms. Sawittiri Devi, wife of Late Sanjai Gupta, was elected as the Second Chairperson of the Town Area Committee, Walidpur Bhira, on 13 May 2023. She was elected with a total of 4,004 votes, and her tenure will continue until 2027. The First Chairperson of the Town Area Committee was Ms. Shamima Ali, wife of Muhammad Ahmad (Ali), who held office for the term 2017–2022.

== Education ==
In the 2011 census there were 10,558 people who were illiterate.

=== Up to Higher Secondary & local schools ===
B.R.K Iter College Walidpur, Primary School Kodra

=== Primary Schools ===
Mathiya, Primary School Qazitola, Primary School Sir Suleman Bhira, IESDUTT Inter College, B.M.D Inter College, Syyeda Modern Public School. BSRK Inter College Ramnagr Khalisa

=== Degree colleges ===
- Arjun Girls Degree College Walidpur

=== Madrassas ===
Walidpur Bhira has a larger number of Madarsa of Madrasa Nurul Islam (Arabic College) was established in 1909 by the supreme ulamas at that time. Other Madrasas include Madrasa Rehmaniya, Madrsa Rauzatul Uloom, Madrasa Mansorool Uloom, Madrsa Rehimiya. Other important religious institutes are Madrasa Azizya Khirul Uloom, Madrasa Husainia, Madarsa Kamiliya Anwarool Uloom, Madrasa Talimulquran.

=== Girls' institutes ===
Madarsa Nurul Islam (Niswan), Arjun Girls Degree College etc. education.

== Economy ==
Out of the total population, 12,387 were engaged in work or business activity. Of this 5,850 were males while 3,537 were females. In census survey, worker is defined as person who does business, job, service, and cultivator and labour activity. Of total 12,387 working population, 86.62% were engaged in Main Work while 13.38% of total workers were engaged in Marginal Work.

Walidpur Bhira is a major place which is known for weaving and this is the main source of income of the town. The people weaving Saari and other clothes on powerlooms or handlooms day and night. Powerlooms were the lifeline of its economy but nowadays people have chosen other sources of income like working in abroad countries, at the present time many people use to go to Gulf countries to earn money.

== Climate ==
Climate of the region is not so comfortable for people because in rainy season having heavy rain, in Winter extreme cold and in summer heated hot, but the climate is good for crops exceptions in only some periods, when rain needed for crops there is no rain and when rain is not necessary there is heavy rain, extreme cold also harm crops.

== Area ==
Walidpur Bhira covers 4 to 5 square kilometer area in this town there are so many localities, Ramnagar, Kodra, Paraskhad, Nayapura, Mathiay, Khiriya, Kuttubpur, Bhira, Bichalapura, Islampura, Uttar Muhalla, Deeh, Bhitti, Naibasti, Kazitola, Eidgah, Naraper, Darara, etc. are the localities also.

== Sport ==
Football, Cricket and Kabaddi are most preferred games in Walid pur Bhira. Badminton Volleyball and other new games are becoming common among the new generations. All locality had their own games team in all formats and they have their own home grounds too Apne Yaar Club B.R.K Inter College Ground, Yound Muslim Sporting Club, Nomani Cricket Club, Azad Cricket Club, Crant, Young Seraj, Dildar Sporting Club, etc. Walid Pur Bhira had many playgrounds like B.R.k Inter College Ground, Madarsa Nurul Islam, Nadi Ground, Bhira Ground etc.

== Architecture ==
A gate of Imam Bargah Walidpur Bhira

Its architecture includes the Jama Masjid Husainia, which is the oldest monument of Walidpur Bhira was made before independence. It is of very similar construction to the Jma Masjid Siddique Akabr of Walidpur Bhira. The Sadar Imam Baargaah of Walidpur is notable example of architecture of Azadari in India. The tomb of the Sufi saint Muhammad Siddique Jaan is located behind Kazitola; the tombo Maulana Kami Sahab is located at Kazitola, The tombo Lal Chiraiya Baba Dargah Nayapura, etc.

== Culture ==
Muslims (both Shia and Sunni) and Hindus, celebrate their religious events. Durga Puja, Divali, Muharram, Eid e Miladun Nabi (S.A.), Ramadhan, and Eid are main religious events. Some time Mushaairah also organized by the people of Ghosi.and jooluse mohammadi (بارہ ربیع الاول) Jashne-Eid-Miladun Nabi.

== Transport ==
By Road

Walidpur Bhira is located on Muhammadabad Ghosi Road and well connected to all Poorvanchal Express 3 km the cities ang Lucknow and Kanpur.

Walidpur Station

By Air

The nearest International airport is Lal Bahadur Shastri International airport Babatpur Varanasi located at the Babatpur outside area of Varanasi city, distance Between Ghosi to Lal Bahadur Shastri International Airport is - 110 km (93.00 miles). Nearest airport to Ghosi Ghosi's nearest airport is Azamgarh Airport situated at 36.0 km distance. Few more airports around Ghosi are as follows. Azamgarh Airport 36.0 km. Ghazipur Airport 55.9 km. Gorakhpur Airport 90.4 km.

By Rail

Walidpur Bhira does have a railway station itself. The nearest Broad Gauge railway station from Walidpur is Muhammadabad Railway station which is located in and around 6.3 kilometer distance. The following table shows other railway stations and its distance from Mamakudi. Indara Jn railway station 38.3 km. Mau Jn railway station 26.1 km. Muhammadabad railway station 5.2 km.. Sathiaon railway station 22.0 km.

== Politics ==
It is Lok Sabha constituency (Hindi: घोसी लोक सभा निर्वाचन क्षेत्र) is Ghosi which is one of the 80 Lok Sabha (parliamentary) constituencies in Uttar Pradesh state and Muhammadabad is its Vidhan Sabha (legislative assembly) seat which is one of the Vidhan Sabha Seats in Uttar Pradesh.

== Demographics ==
Religion in Walidpur (2011)
Religion	Percent
Islam	58.05%
Hinduism	41.33%
Christianity	0.19%
Buddhism	0.03%
Jainism	0.02%
Others	0.38%

Overview Walidpur Bhira

Walidpur Bhira is a Nagar Panchayat in district of Mau, Uttar Pradesh. It is divided into 16 wards for which elections are held every 5 years.

Religion Percent

Islam 58.05 Hinduism 41.33 Christianity 0.19 Buddhism 0.03 Jainism 0.02

Languages of Ghosi

The native language of Walidpur Bhira is Hindi, Urdu and most of the village people speak Hindi, Urdu.
