= Mundera Bazar =

- town
- Location in Uttar Pradesh, India Mundera Bazar (India)
- Coordinates: 26.649°N 83.594°E
- Country: India
- State: Uttar Pradesh
- District: Gorakhpur

Government
  - Type: Nagar Panchayat
  - Body: Nagar Panchayat

Population (2022)
  - Total: 26,503

Languages
  - Official: Hindi
- Time zone: UTC+5:30 (IST)

Mundera Bazar is a town and a nagar panchayat in Gorakhpur district in the Indian state of Uttar Pradesh. MRs. Sunita Gupta, is the chairman of this nagar panchayat.

Mundera Bazar is related to the Chauri Chaura incident of 5 February 1922, who many commentators, following tradition established by R. Palme Dutt in India today, have continued to condemn decision taken by Gandhiji to withdraw the Non cooperation movement.

== Demographics ==
As of 2001 India census, Mundera Bazar had a population of 11,226. As of 2022 voter list, total population extended to 26,503, after the addition of 6 gram panchayat in this Nagar Panchayat. Males constitute 52% of the population and females 48%. Mundera Bazar has an average literacy rate of 69%, higher than the national average of 59.5%: male literacy is 76%, and female literacy is 62%. In Mundera Bazar, 14% of the population is under 6 years of age.
