= Mohanpur, Uttar Pradesh =

Mohanpur
- Town
- Location in Uttar Pradesh, India Mohanpur (India)
- Coordinates: 28.27°N 80.25°E
- Country: India
- State: Uttar Pradesh
- District: Etah
- Elevation: 164 m (538 ft)

Population (2001)
  - Total: 5,299

Languages
  - Official: Hindi
- Time zone: UTC+5:30 (IST)
- Vehicle registration: UP-82
- Website: up.gov.in

Mohanpur is a town and a nagar panchayat in Etah district in the Indian state of Uttar Pradesh.

== Geography ==
Mohanpur is located at 28.27°N 80.25°E. It has an average elevation of 164 metres (538 feet).

== Demographics ==
As of the 2001 Census of India, Mohanpur had a population of 5299. Males constitute 54% of the population and females 46%. Mohanpur has an average literacy rate of 48%, lower than the national average of 59.5%: male literacy is 57%, and female literacy is 37%. In Mohanpur, 20% of the population is under 6 years of age.
