= Harra, Uttar Pradesh =

Harra
- town
- Location in Uttar Pradesh, India Harra (India)
- Coordinates: 29°07′40″N 77°29′10″E
- Country: India
- State: Uttar Pradesh
- District: Meerut

Population (2011)
  - Total: 35,000

Languages
  - Official: Hindi, English, Urdu
- Time zone: UTC+5:30 (IST)
- PIN: 250344
- telephone code: 91- 01237- xxxxx xxxxx
- Vehicle registration: Up-15
- Website: up.gov.in

Harra is a town and a nagar panchayat in the Sarurpur Khurd Mandal of Meerut District in Uttar Pradesh, India. It is 12 kilometres (7.5 mi) from Sardhana, 500 kilometres (310 mi) from the state capital in Lucknow and 65 kilometres (40 mi) northeast of New Delhi. The population of Harra according to 2011 Census of India was 35,000. Harra Population is Mostly Muslim Rajput (Ranghar).

Harra is known for its education hub and textiles market.Declared "Gram Harra" as Nagar Panchayat in 2017. The public chose Mrs. Husno wife Mr. Gulzar as the candidate for the post of the first Nagar Panchayat President (Chairman) of Nagar Panchayat Harra. Mrs. Husno wife Mr. Gulzar Vs. Mr. Kunwar Mohammad Ali, Mohd Ali Contractor, Mujeeb son Tahir Patwari contested the election. Current Chairman of Harra is Mr Kunwar Mohd Ali (2022-2027)
