= Kakod =

Kakod Kakod
- Town
- Location in Uttar Pradesh, India
- Coordinates: 28°17′59.68″N 77°41′34.805″E
- Country: India
- State: Uttar Pradesh
- District: Bulandshahr

Population (2001)
  - Total: 7,119

Language
  - Official: Hindi
  - Additional official: Urdu
- Time zone: UTC+5:30 (IST)
- Postal code: 203203

Kakod is a town and a nagar panchayat in Bulandshahr district in the Indian state of Uttar Pradesh.

== Politics ==
As of 2023, the Chairman of this Nagar Panchayat Mr. Mohit singhal.

== Demographics ==
At the 2001 India census, Kakore had a population of 7,119. Males constitute 53% of the population and females 47%. Kakore has an average literacy rate of 43%, lower than the national average of 59.5%: male literacy is 53%, and female literacy is 33%. In Kakore, 22% of the population is under 6 years of age.
