= Kathera =

Katera
- Town
- Interactive map of Katera
- Coordinates: 25.234798°N 78.913303°E
- Country: India
- State: Uttar Pradesh
- District: Jhansi

Population (2001)
  - Total: 6,389

Languages
  - Official: Hindi
- Time zone: UTC+5:30 (IST)
- Postal code: 284205
- Vehicle registration: UP
- Website: up.gov.in

Katera is a town and a nagar panchayat in Jhansi district in the Indian state of Uttar Pradesh.

== Demographics ==
As of the 2001 Census of India, Katera had a population of 6,389. Males constitute 54% of the population and females 46%. Katera has an average literacy rate of 51%, lower than the national average of 59.5%: male literacy is 62%, and female literacy is 38%. In Katera, 16% of the population is under 6 years of age.
