= Sirauli =

- Town
- Location in Uttar Pradesh, India
- Coordinates: 28°29′35″N 79°05′07″E
- Country: India
- State: Uttar Pradesh
- District: Bareilly

Population (2001)
  - Total: 19,021

Languages
  - Official: Hindi
- Time zone: UTC+5:30 (IST)
- Vehicle registration: UP 25

Sirauli is a town and a nagar panchayat in Bareilly district in the Indian state of Uttar Pradesh. Shrimati Chaman Saqlaini is the current chairperson of the town and Rajan Nath tiwari current EO .

== Demographics ==
As of 2001 India census, Sirauli had a population of 19,021. Males constitute 53% of the population and females 47%. Sirauli has an average literacy rate of 75%, higher than the national average of 59.5%: male literacy is 81%, and female literacy is 68%. In Sirauli, 20% of the population is under 6 years of age.
