= Budanpur =

Village in Uttar Pradesh, India

Coordinates: 26°39′N 82°03′E

Budanpur is a village 35 km east of Azamgarh, Uttar Pradesh, India.
