= Koeripur =

- Town
- Location in Uttar Pradesh, India Koeripur (India)
- Country: India
- State: Uttar Pradesh
- Division: Faizabad division
- District: Sultanpur

Population (2001)
  - Total: 7,268

Language
  - Official: Hindi
  - Additional official: Urdu
- Time zone: UTC+5:30 (IST)
- Postal code: 222301

Koeripur is a town and a nagar panchayat in Lambhua tehsil of the Sultanpur district in the Indian state of Uttar Pradesh, India. It is a part of Faizabad division in Uttar Pradesh state. Keoripur is 41 km away from district headquarters Sultanpur city.

== Demographics ==
As of 2001 India census, Koeripur had a population of 7268. Males constitute 51% of the population and females 49%. Koeripur has an average literacy rate of 56%, lower than the national average of 59.5%: male literacy is 65%, and female literacy is 47%. In Koeripur, 19% of the population is under 6 years of age.
