= Nagra, Uttar Pradesh =

Nagra
- Town
- Nagra
- Location in Uttar Pradesh, India
- Coordinates: 25.968°N 83.873°E
- Country: India
- State: Uttar Pradesh
- District: Ballia

Population (2011)
  - Total: 14,405

Languages
  - Official: Hindi, Bhojpuri
- Time zone: UTC+5:30 (IST)
- PIN: 221711
- Vehicle registration: UP60

Nagra is a town and a municipal board in Ballia district in the Indian state of Uttar Pradesh. It has an important market for the nearby villages.

Lounglatta is the famous sweet of Nagra. Here the festival of Muharram, Eid and Bakrid is celebrated. Its Dushehara fair is famous in Ballia district. Nagra many schools and colleges. Nagra celebrates Durga Puja in a big way.

== Demography ==
Nagra village had a total population of 14,405 according to the 2011 census. As Nagra was declared a town area in 2021, its population is now estimated to be over 20,000. It has a police station, schools and colleges.
