= Nai Bazar =

- Town
- Location in Uttar Pradesh, India Nai Bazar (India)
- Coordinates: 25°25′N 82°35′E
- Country: India
- State: Uttar Pradesh
- District: Bhadohi

Population (2001)
  - Total: 11,887

Languages
  - Official: Hindi
- Time zone: UTC+5:30 (IST)
- Vehicle registration: UP
- Website: up.gov.in

Nai Bazar is a town and a nagar panchayat in Bhadohi district in the Indian state of Uttar Pradesh.

== Demographics ==
As of 2001 India census, Nai Bazar had a population of 11,887. Males constitute 54% of the population and females 46%. Nai Bazar has an average literacy rate of 53%, lower than the national average of 59.5%: male literacy is 63%, and female literacy is 41%. In Nai Bazar, 19% of the population is under 6 years of age.
