= Samdhan =

- nagar panchayat
- Location in Uttar Pradesh, India Samdhan (India)
- Coordinates: 27.137°N 79.703°E
- Country: India
- State: Uttar Pradesh
- District: Kannauj

Population (2011)
  - Total: 31,479
- Time zone: UTC+5:30 (IST)

Samdhan is a town and a nagar panchayat in Kannauj district in the Indian state of Uttar Pradesh.

== Demographics ==
As of 2001 India census, Samdhan had a population of 25,310. Males constitute 53% of the population and females 47%. Samdhan has an average literacy rate of 35%, lower than the national average of 59.5%: male literacy is 44%, and female literacy is 25%. In Samdhan, 21% of the population is under 6 years of age.
