= Kemri =

- Town
- Location in Uttar Pradesh, India Kemri (India)
- Coordinates: 28.805°N 79.203°E
- Country: India
- State: Uttar Pradesh
- District: Rampur
- Elevation: 372 m (1,220 ft)

Population (2021)
  - Total: 88,698

Languages
  - Official: Hindi, Urdu
- Time zone: UTC+5:30 (IST)
- Vehicle registration: UP-22
- Website: kemri.netlify.app

Kemri is a town and nagar panchayat in Rampur district in the Indian state of Uttar Pradesh.

Someone who lives in Kemri created its website for free and you can check it kemri.netlify.app

Kemri was a part of the princely state of the Nawab of Rampur. It belongs to the siddique caste. It became a part of the Indian state when the Rampur state merged with the Indian Nation. Situated between the cities of Rampur and Bilaspur, Kemri holds significant political importance in the region.

The Kemri city is divided into 15 wards for which elections are held every 5 years. The Kemri Nagar Panchayat has a population of 28,699 of which 14,972 are males while 13,726 are females as per the report released by the Census of India for 2011.

== Geography ==
Kemri is located at 28.805°N 79.203°E. It has an average elevation of 372 metres (764 feet).In Kemri there are many villages such as bhatpura, chamraua, chamarpura, simaliya etc. It is about 20 km away from Rampur and about 13 km away from Bilaspur. The transport system is available from Rampur or Bilaspur and can be done on private buses which runs from morning 6 am to evening 8 pm.

== Demographics ==
As of 2011 India census, The population of children aged 0-6 is 4520 which is 15.75% of total population of Kemri (NP). In Kemri Nagar Panchayat, the female sex ratio is 917 against state average of 912. Moreover, the child sex ratio in Kemri is around 924 compared to Uttar Pradesh state average of 902. The literacy rate of Kemri city is 44.84% lower than state average of 67.68%. In Kemri, male literacy is around 52.76% while the female literacy rate is 36.18%.

Kemri Nagar Panchayat has total administration over 4,645 houses to which it supplies basic amenities like water and sewerage. It is also authorized to build roads within Nagar Panchayat limits and impose taxes on properties coming under its jurisdiction.

== Caste factor ==
Schedule Caste (SC) constitutes 2.58% while Schedule Tribe (ST) were 0.02% of total population in Kemri (NP).

== Work Profile ==
Out of total population, 7,815 were engaged in work or business activity. Of this 6,786 were males while 1,029 were females. In census survey, worker is defined as person who does business, job, service, and cultivator and labour activity. Of total 7814 working population, 85.79% were engaged in Main Work while 14.21% of total workers were engaged in Marginal Work.
