= Kurara =

- Town
- Location in Uttar Pradesh, India Kurara (India)
- Coordinates: 25.98°N 79.98°E
- Country: India
- State: Uttar Pradesh
- District: Hamirpur
- Founder: Still unknown

Government
  - Type: Nagar Panchayat
- Elevation: 120 m (390 ft)

Population (2011)
  - Total: 13,480

Languages
  - Official: Hindi
- Time zone: UTC+5:30 (IST)
- Postal code: 210505
- Vehicle registration: UP
- Website: knowmanu.webnode.in

Kurara is a town and a nagar panchayat in Hamirpur district in the Indian state of Uttar Pradesh.

== Demographics ==
As of 2011 India census, Kurara had a population of 13,408. Males constitute 54% of the population and females 46%. Kurara has an average literacy rate of 83.89%, higher than the national average of 59.5%: male literacy is 90.56%, and female literacy is 72.23%. In Kurara, 12.60% of the population is under 6 years of age. In Kurara (NP), most of the (NP)rs are from Schedule Caste (SC). Schedule Caste (SC) constitutes 38.24% while Schedule Tribe (ST) were 0.10% of total population in Kurara (NP).

Out of total population, 4,205 were engaged in work or business activity. Of this 3,607 were males while 598 were females. In census survey, worker is defined as person who does business, job, service, and cultivator and labour activity. Of total 4205 working population, 69.77% were engaged in Main Work while 30.23% of total workers were engaged in Marginal Work. A huge jungle of thorny trees like babool also there in jamuna belt

Kurara is also known as a centre for Bhartiya Janta Party (BJP), Rashtriya Swayamsevak Sangh (RSS) and Gaytri Parivaar in Hamirpur District. Bhuiyan Rani Mandir is also situated at Jalokhar(Kurara).

== General ==
- Seismicity: No earthquake has been observed in the district during the last 200 years. The district has experienced a few earthquakes originating in the Himalayan boundary fault zone, the Moradabad fault and the Narmada Tapti fault zones.
- Climate: The climate of the district is characterised by an intensely hot summer, and a pleasant cold season. The summer season from March to about middle of June is followed by the south-west monsoon season from mid-June to the end of September. October and first half of November constitute the post-monsoon period. The cold season is from mid-November to February.
- Temperature: May and the beginning of June are generally the hottest period of the year and maximum temperature in May is about 43 °C and minimum about 28 °C. The heat during the summer is intense. The maximum temperature on individual days sometimes reaches 48 °C or more. During the cold season minimum temperature sometimes drops down to about 2 or 3 °C.

== History ==
Early on, Kurara was known for his bravery and courage It is said that Raja Hamirdev, King of Hamirpur Raja Hamiir dev was enmeshed in a very Revalian war and asked the Gaur Thakurs of Kurara for help and with their help won that war. A Vijay Pataka (Jhanda) was given by the king as a symbol of victory to Gaur Thakurs of Kurara and from that day onwards every year on the day after holi a Vijay Pataka and a Rath of Lord Ram and Lakshamana with many other jhankiis are transported from Ramlila Maidan to Jhanda Talab, followed by a crowd celebrating the king's victory.

During British colonial rule Kurara served as a staying point of British officials in the area as the Kothi, or rest house, built by them is still here and currently is in use by the irrigation department.

== Schools ==
1 Dr. V.N. Singh Bundelkhad Education Academy Kurara 2. Bharti Shishu mandir poorv madhymik vidhyalay 3. Jagannath Vidya mandir 4. Gurukulam Public School 5. Shri Ram Krishna Mahavidyalaya 6. Sanskrita Mahavidhyalaya 7. Shri Naubhara Mahavidhyalaya 8. Govt. Inter College 9. Kasturba inter college 10. Vidya Mandir Junior High School 11. Shri Bhuri Devi Mahila Mahavidhyala 12. Bal vidya mandir kurara 13. Saraswati Shishu mandir Kurara 14. R.N Gurukulam 15. Mirabai Junior high school Kurara 16. Pandit Deendayal Upadhyay Inter college 17. Jankpuri high convent 18. Hans Vahini Gyan Mandir English school beri road 19. RR International Public School, Nai Basti Beri Road
