= Sirsa, Uttar Pradesh =

Sirsa
- Town
- Location in Uttar Pradesh, India Sirsa (India)
- Coordinates: 25.28°N 82.08°E
- Country: India
- State: Uttar Pradesh
- District: Prayagraj
- Elevation: 65 m (213 ft)

Population (2011)
  - Total: 12,686

Language
  - Official: Hindi
  - Additional official: Urdu
- Time zone: UTC+5:30 (IST)
- Vehicle registration: UP-70
- Website: up.gov.in

Sirsa is a town and a nagar panchayat in Prayagraj district in the Indian state of Uttar Pradesh.

== Geography ==
United village of Parva (u.v.p) has an average elevation of 36 metres. It is the biggest town area in Prayagraj district. The town has a huge religious importance, being on the bank of the River Ganges area. U.V.P is a village in Uruwan Tehsil in Prayagraj district of Uttar Pradesh State, India. It belongs to Prayagraj division. It is located 49 km to the east of district headquarters Prayagraj. 13 km from Uruwan. 253 km from State capital Lucknow Parva Uparhar Pin code is 212305 and postal head office is Sirsa. Bhabhaura Uparhar (2 km), Tela Khas (3.2 km), Madara Mukundpur Uparhar (2 km), Kaneda Uparhar (3 km), Javaniya (4.2 km) are the nearby villages to Parva Uparhar. United village of parva is surrounded by Handia Tehsil to the north, Uruwan Tehsil to the west, Saidabad Tehsil to the north, Meja Tehsil to the south. Phulpur, Mirzapur, Prayagraj, Jaunpur are the nearby cities to u.v.p

== Population ==
Of 2011 India census, united village of parva had a population of 1699. Males constitute 53% of the population and females 47%. u.v.p has an average literacy rate of 76%, higher than the national average of 59.5%: male literacy is 77%, and female literacy is 54%. In u.v.p, 14% of the population is under 6 years of age.
