= Lawar =

- Town
- Location in Uttar Pradesh, India
- Coordinates: 29°07′N 77°46′E
- Country: India
- State: Uttar Pradesh
- District: Meerut

Government
  - Body: Nagar Panchayat

Population (2011)
  - Total: 12,021

Languages
  - Official: Hindi urdu
- Time zone: UTC+5:30 (IST)
- Postal code: 250222

Lawar is a town and a nagar panchayat in Meerut district in the Indian state of Uttar Pradesh.

== Demographics ==
As of 2011 India census, Lawar had a population of 16,021. Males constitute 53% of the population and females 47%. Lawar has an average literacy rate of 48.5%, lower than the national average of 74.04%: male literacy is 55%, and female literacy is 42%. In Lawar, 19% of the population is under 6 years of age.
