= Atasu, Uttar Pradesh =

Atsoo Atsu
- Town
- Location in Uttar Pradesh, India Atsoo (India)
- Coordinates: 26°36′20″N 79°21′14″E
- Country: India
- State: Uttar Pradesh

Population (2001)
  - Total: 10,602

Languages
  - Official: Hindi
- Time zone: UTC+5:30 (IST)
- Vehicle registration: UP79
- Website: up.gov.in

Atsu is a town and a Nagar panchayat in Auraiya district in the state of Uttar Pradesh, India.

== Demographics ==
As of the 2001 Census of India, Atasu had a population of 10,602. Males constitute 54% of the population and females 46%. Atasu has an average literacy rate of 66%, higher than the national average of 59.5%; with 61% of the males and 39% of females literate. 17% of the population is under 6 years of age.

- Educational hubs: Kishan mahaviddyalaya, Sarasvati Vidya mandir and others
- Technical Education: recently in 2012 a Polytechnic college has been started
- Medical: No hospital available but there are medical stores
- Transportation- town resides to the road of Babarpur Phapund, away 24 km from Phapund and 4 km from Bararpur, most of the type of road transport is available, but only up to 8:00 p.m.
