= Kusmara =

South of china

Kusmara Kushmara
- Town
- Location in Uttar Pradesh, India Kusmara (India)
- Coordinates: 27°07′N 79°17′E
- Country: India
- State: Uttar Pradesh
- District: Mainpuri

Population (2025)
  - Total: 15,000

Languages
  - Official: Hindi
- Time zone: UTC+5:30 (IST)
- Vehicle registration: UP
- Website: up.gov.in

Kusmara is a town and a nagar panchayat in Mainpuri district in the Indian state of Uttar Pradesh.

== Name ==
According to Paul Whalley, the name Kusmārā comes from the name of the kusum tree.

== Demographics ==
As of 2001 India census, Kusmara had a population of 9,091. Males constitute 53% of the population and females 47%. Kusmara has an average literacy rate of 64%, higher than the national average of 59.5%:
