= Maharajganj, Uttar Pradesh Lok Sabha constituency =

Lok Sabha Constituency in Uttar Pradesh

Coordinates: 27.15°N 83.56°E

Maharajganj UP-63
- Lok Sabha constituency
- Interactive Map Outlining Maharajganj Lok Sabha constituency

Constituency details
- Country: India
- Region: North India
- State: Uttar Pradesh
- Assembly constituencies: Pharenda; Nautanwa; Siswa; Maharajganj; Paniyara
- Established: 1952
- Reservation: None

Member of Parliament
- 18th Lok Sabha
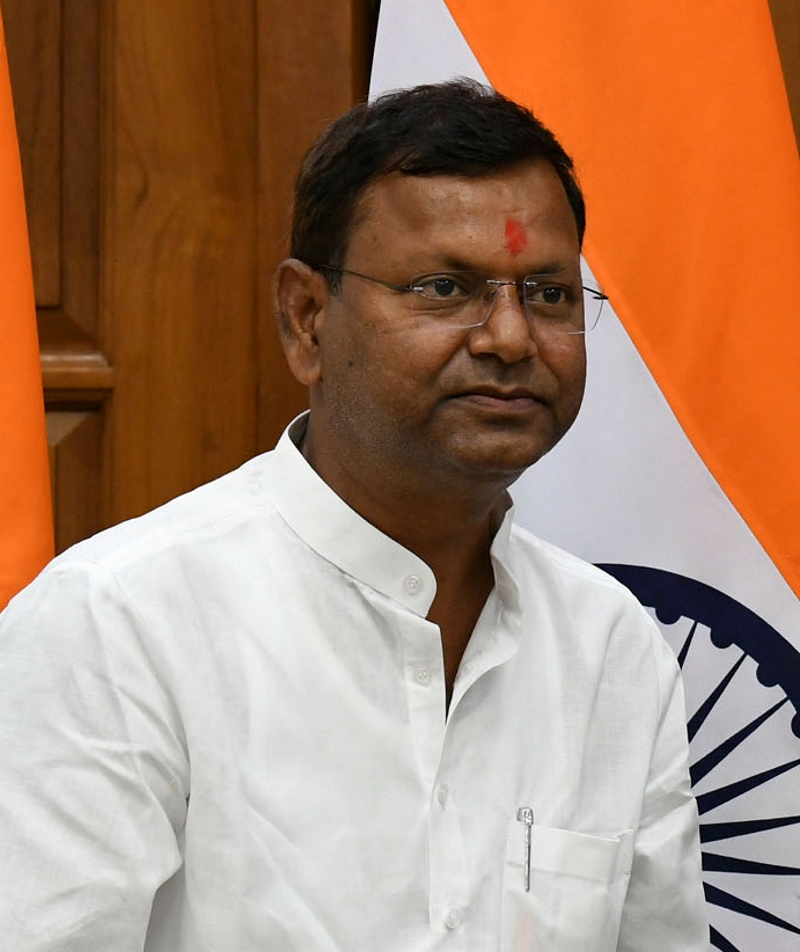
- Incumbent Pankaj Choudhary
- Party: BJP
- Elected year: 2024

Maharajganj Lok Sabha constituency is one of the 80 Lok Sabha (parliamentary) constituencies in Uttar Pradesh state in northern India.
There is a constituency by the same name in Bihar as well.

== Assembly segments ==
Presently, Maharajganj Lok Sabha constituency comprises five Vidhan Sabha (legislative assembly) segments. These are:

No	Name	District	Member	Party	2024 Lead
315	Pharenda	Maharajganj	Virendra Chaudhary	INC	INC
316	Nautanwa	Maharajganj	Rishi Tripathi	NISHAD	BJP
317	Siswa	Maharajganj	Prem Sagar Patel	BJP	BJP
318	Maharajganj (SC)	Maharajganj	Jai Mangal Kanojiya	BJP	BJP
319	Paniyara	Maharajganj	Gyanendra Singh	BJP	BJP

== Members of Parliament ==
Year	Member	Party
1952	Shibban Lal Saxena	Independent politician
1957	Shibban Lal Saxena	Independent politician
1962	Mahadeo Prasad	Indian National Congress
1967	Mahadeo Prasad	Indian National Congress
1971	Shibban Lal Saxena	Independent politician
1977	Shibban Lal Saxena	Janata Party
1980	Ashfaq Husain Ansari	Indian National Congress
1984	Jitender Singh	Indian National Congress
1989	Harsh Vardhan	Janata Dal
1991	Pankaj Chaudhary	Bharatiya Janata Party
1996	Pankaj Chaudhary	Bharatiya Janata Party
1998	Pankaj Chaudhary	Bharatiya Janata Party
1999	Kunwar Akhilesh Singh	Samajwadi Party
2004	Pankaj Chaudhary	Bharatiya Janata Party
2009	Harsh Vardhan	Indian National Congress
2014	Pankaj Chaudhary	Bharatiya Janata Party
2019	Pankaj Chaudhary	Bharatiya Janata Party
2024	Pankaj Chaudhary	Bharatiya Janata Party

== Election results ==
=== 2024 ===
2024 Indian general elections: Maharajganj
Party	Candidate	Votes	%	±%
BJP	Pankaj Chaudhary	591,310	48.85	▼10.35
INC	Virendra Chaudhary	5,55,859	45.92	▲40.01
BSP	Mohammad Mausme Alam	32,955	2.72	▲2.72
NOTA	None of the Above	9,745	0.81	▼0.04
Margin of victory		35,451	2.93	▼24.82
Turnout		12,10,451	60.31	▼3.76
BJP hold		Swing		

=== 2019 ===
2019 Indian general elections: Maharajganj
Party	Candidate	Votes	%	±%
BJP	Pankaj Chaudhary	726,349	59.20	
SP	Akhilesh Singh	3,85,925	31.45	
INC	Supriya Shrinate	72,516	5.91	
NOTA	None of the Above	10,478	0.85	
Margin of victory		3,40,424	27.75	
Turnout		12,27,224	64.07	
BJP hold		Swing		

=== 2014 ===
2014 Indian general elections: Maharajganj
Party	Candidate	Votes	%	±%
BJP	Pankaj Chaudhary	471,542	44.65	
BSP	Kashi Nath Shukla	2,31,084	21.88	
SP	Akhilesh Singh	2,13,974	20.26	
INC	Harsh Vardhan	57,193	5.42	
Margin of victory		2,40,458	22.77	
Turnout		10,60,241	60.82	
BJP hold		Swing		

=== 2009 ===
2009 Indian general elections: Maharajganj
Party	Candidate	Votes	%	±%
INC	Harsh Vardhan Shrinate	305,474	51.00	
BSP	Ganesh Shanker Pandey	1,81,846	30.30	
BJP	Pankaj Chaudhary	1,73,041	28.90	
SP	Ajeet Mani	1,06,602	17.80	
Margin of victory		1,23,628	20.70	
Turnout		5,99,531	39.73	
INC gain from BJP		Swing		

== See also ==
- Maharajganj
- Maharajganj district
- List of constituencies of the Lok Sabha
