= List of villages in Nautanwa tehsil =

Nautanwa is a Tehsil/Block in the Mahrajganj District of Uttar Pradesh. According to Census 2011 information, the sub-district code of Nautanwa block is 00944. There are about 259 villages in Nautanwa block.

- Achal Garh
- Achalgarh
- Ahirauli
- Amahva
- Amava
- Araji Gayadatt Urf Subedarpur
- Araji Mahuva
- Araji Sarkar
- Araji Sarkar Urf Bairihawa
- Araji Sarkar Urf Jot Pharenda
- Araji Suvain
- Asuraina
- Aurahva Kala
- Aurahva Khurd
- Babhni
- Bagha
- Bahorpur
- Baijnathpur Urf Charka
- Baikunthpur
- Bairva Bankatva
- Bairva Bhatpurva
- Bairva Chandanpur
- Bairva Jungal
- Bakeniya Harraiya
- Banrasiya Kala
- Banrasiya Khurd
- Banvatari
- Barahara
- Barahra Bishwambharpur
- Barahra Shivnath
- Baranhava
- Barawa Bhoj
- Bargadava
- Bargadva Ayodhya
- Bargadva Bishunpur
- Bargadva Madhubani
- Bargadwa Urf Ganwaria
- Bariya
- Barva Kala
- Barwa Khurd
- Basantpur
- Bataediha
- Belahiy
- Belaspur
- Belauha Darra
- Belauha Ghat
- Belbhar
- Belva Buzurg
- Belva Khurd
- Bhagat Purva
- Bhagvanpur
- Bhairi Pipri
- Bhaisahiya
- Bharvaliy
- Bhotaha
- Bhurkurva
- Bishkhop
- Bishunpur Kurthiya
- Bishunpur Phulvariya
- Bishunpura
- Bokava
- Brahmpur
- Chainpur
- Chakdah
- Chakrar
- Chamaini Urf Bhehri
- Chamainiya
- Chandi Than
- Chandpur
- Charlaha
- Chautarva
- Chhapwa
- Chhitrapar
- Dashrath Pur
- Deoghatti
- Devipur
- Devipur Kala
- Devpur
- Dhaurahra
- Dhotihva
- Dhuswakala
- Dogahara
- Durgapur
- Ekma
- Eksarva
- Farenda
- Gajaraha
- Gajpati
- Gajrahi
- Ganeshpur
- Gangapur
- Gangvaliya
- Gauharpur
- Ghorahava
- Gujroliya Shanker
- Hanuman Garhiya
- Harakhpura
- Hardi Dali
- Harlalgarh
- Harmandir Kala
- Harpur
- Harraiya Khurd
- Harraiya Raghubir
- Hathiya Garh
- Hathiyahwa
- Jagannath Pur
- Jamuhani
- Jamuhra Kala
- Jara
- Jhigati
- Jigina
- Jignihava
- Jogiabari
- Jugauli
- Jungal Gulahariya
- Jungle Hathiyagarh
- Jungle Sonval
- Kaithvaliya Pathak
- Kaithwalia Urf Bargadahi
- Kajari
- Kandhpur
- Kandhpur Van Tangia
- Karaila Ajgarha
- Karailiya
- Karimdadpur
- Karmahava Khurd
- Karmahva
- Karmahva Basantpur
- Kashipur
- Kataikot Urf Bhadrahana
- Kavlahi
- Khairati
- Khairhava Jungal
- Khairhva Dube
- Khalik Garh
- Khanua
- Kharag Barva
- Kodaipur Urf Gidaha
- Kohargaddi
- Koharwal
- Koluha Urf Sihorva
- Kot Kamhariya
- Kunserwa
- Kurahava Bujurg
- Kurahava Khurd
- Lalpur Kalyanpur
- Laxhmipur Kaithvaliya
- Laxmi Nagar
- Luhasi
- Luthhahva
- Madrahava Kaktahi
- Mahari
- Mahdeiya
- Mahdeva Basdeela
- Mahdeva Kashiram
- Maheshpur Mahdiya
- Mahuari
- Mahuawa Adda
- Mahuva
- Mahuwa
- Majhauli
- Manglapur
- Manik Talab
- Manikapur
- Marjadpur
- Mathiyaidu
- Moglaha
- Mohnapur
- Murali
- Murehra
- Murila
- Naikot
- Narayanpur
- Narkataha
- Nauniya
- Navabi Ghat
- Navadih Urf Deopur
- Nipaniya
- Paisiya Babu
- Paisiya Lalaien
- Paisiya Urf Konghusari
- Pakardiha
- Parauli
- Pariya Tal
- Parmesrapur
- Parsa
- Parsa Dayaram
- Parsa Malik
- Parsa Pandey
- Parsa Somali
- Parsauni Kala
- Parsoni
- Phulvariya
- Piparhava
- Pipra
- Pipra Sohat
- Piprahiya
- Pipriya
- Pokhar Bhinda
- Pokharbhinda Urf Bangahva
- Purainiya
- Purandrapur Sonbarsa
- Purushottampur
- Raghunath Pur
- Rajabari
- Rajapur
- Rajdhani
- Rajmandir Khurd
- Rajpur Khurd
- Ram Nagar
- Ramgarhva
- Ramnagar
- Rampur Jhalua
- Ranipur
- Ratanpur
- Rehra
- Rudauli Urf Karaila
- Rudrapur Shivnath
- Rudrapur Urf Bangai
- Sagarhava
- Sakasi
- Samardhira
- Sampatiha
- Sarangapur
- Sekhuani
- Semarhava
- Semrahna
- Semrahva Urf Jammu Haniya
- Sevatari
- Shishgarh
- Shishvariya Urf Shismahal
- Shivpuri
- Shyamkat
- Sihabhar
- Singhpur Kala
- Sinhorva
- Sinhpur Tharauli
- Sirsiya Khas
- Sirsiya Masharki
- Sisvaniya Bishun
- Siswa Taufir
- Siswa Urf Khoriya
- Sonbarsa Kahraiya
- Sondhi
- Sonpipri
- Sonval
- Sukrauli
- Sukrauli Urf Argha
- Sukrauli Urf Suryapura
- Sundi
- Surpar
- Suryapura
- Tal Ainjer
- Taraini
- Tenduhi
- Terhi
- Tharauli Buzurg
- Tinkonia
- Trilokpur
