= Hridaya Shanker Singh =

Vice chancellor of Maa Shakumbhari University

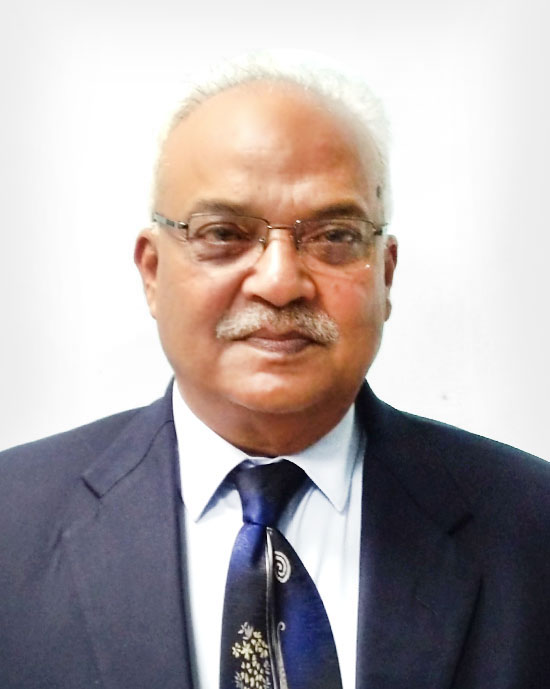
- Born: 1 June 1958 (age 68); Bridgmanganj, Uttar Pradesh, India
- Education: Bachelor of Science Zoology, Master of Science Zoology, PhD Zoology, Lucknow University
- Occupations: Professor, Vice Chancellor
- Notable work: Vice Chancellor of Maa Shakumbhari University

Hridaya Shanker Singh is the first Vice Chancellor of Maa Shakumbhari University in Uttar Pradesh where he is serving from 31 December 2021.

Before this Prof. H S Singh retired as a Professor from the Zoology Department of Chaudhary Charan Singh University where he served from 1983 till 2021. He has been Pro-Vice-Chancellor, Controller of Examinations at Chaudhary Charan Singh University and former Director at Sir Chhotu Ram Engineering College . He is from small town, Bridgmanganj of district Maharajganj in Uttar Pradesh.
