= Gurli Ramgarhwa railway station =

Railway station in Uttar Pradesh, India

Gurli Ramgarhwa

General information
- Location: Siswa Bazar Road, Sabaya, Maharajganj district, Uttar Pradesh; India
- Coordinates: 27°11′09″N 83°46′17″E
- Elevation: 100 m (330 ft)
- System: Passenger train station
- Owner: Indian Railways
- Operator: North Eastern Railway
- Line: Muzaffarpur–Gorakhpur main line
- Platforms: 1
- Tracks: 1

Construction
- Structure type: Standard (on ground station)

Other information
- Status: Active
- Station code: GRRG
- Zone(s): North Eastern Railway zone
- Division(s): Varanasi

History
- Opened: 1930s

Services
Preceding station	Indian Railways	Following station
Siswa Bazar towards ?	North Eastern Railway zone Muzaffarpur–Gorakhpur main line	Khadda towards ?
Location

Gurli Ramgarhwa railway station is a railway station on Muzaffarpur–Gorakhpur main line under the Varanasi railway division of North Eastern Railway zone. This is situated beside Siswa Bazar Road at Sabaya in Maharajganj district of the Indian state of Uttar Pradesh.
