= Pyari Devi =

Indian politician

Member of Legislative Assembly
- In office 1969-1974
- Constituency: Pharenda

Personal details
- Died: Dhani Bazar,
- Party: Indian National Congress
- Spouse: Gauriram Gupta

Pyari Devi Agrahari was Indian politician and wife of freedom fighter Gauriram Gupta. She was elected as MLA for Pharenda in 1969 Uttar Pradesh assembly election. She was member of Uttar Pradesh Vidhan Sabha from 1969 to 1974. Pyari Devi was first women legislator of Gorakhpur (now Maharajganj) district.

== See also ==
- Uttar Pradesh Vidhan Sabha
