= Bajrang Bahadur Singh (politician) =

Indian politician

Member of Legislative Assembly of Pharenda
- In office March 2017 – March 2022
- Preceded by: Vinod Mani Tripathi
- Succeeded by: Virendra Chaudhary
- In office March 2012 – March 2015 (Disqualified)
- Succeeded by: Vinod Mani Tripathi
- In office May 2007 – March 2012
- Preceded by: Shyam Narayan

Personal details
- Born: 1 July 1971 (age 54) Bharhata, Gorakhpur, Uttar Pradesh
- Party: Bharatiya Janata Party
- Education: Political science
- Alma mater: Deen Dayal Upadhyay Gorakhpur University
- Occupation: MLA
- Profession: Politician; Farmer
- As on 6 June 2020

Bajrang Bahadur Singh (born 1 July 1971) is an Indian politician who was a member of 15th, 16th and 17th Legislative Assembly of Uttar Pradesh. He represented the Pharenda (Assembly constituency) in Maharajganj district of Uttar Pradesh and is a member of the Bharatiya Janata Party.

== Early life and education ==
Singh was born 1 July 1971 in the Marhatha village in Campierganj tehsil of Gorakhpur district of Uttar Pradesh to father late Parmeshwar Singh. He graduated in Political science and Prachin Historical Sainya Science from Deen Dayal Upadhyay Gorakhpur University in 1991. On 3 May 1992, he married Punita Singh, with whom he has a son and three daughters.

He is also owner of Parmeshwar Singh Memorial Postgraduate College and Parmeshwar Singh Memorial Public School in Mathura Nagar, Maharajganj.

== Political career ==
Singh has been MLA for three straight terms. He started his political journey in 15th Legislative Assembly of Uttar Pradesh (2007) elections, he got ticket by Bharatiya Janata Party from Pharenda (Assembly constituency) and was elected MLA by defeating Bahujan Samaj Party candidate Virendra Chaudhary by a margin of 8,914 votes.

In 16th Legislative Assembly of Uttar Pradesh (2012) elections, he was again elected MLA from Pharenda by defeating Indian National Congress candidate Virendra Chaudhary by a margin of 13,335 votes.

In October, a complaint was lodged to the Lokayukta against BJP MLA Bajrang Bahadur Singh from Pharenda seat of Maharajganj district, that he was doing government contract. Lokayukta Justice NK Mehrotra, in the investigation, found the charges against Singh to be correct and recommended the government dismiss his assembly membership. The recommendation of the Lokayukta was sent by the government to the Governor. The governor referred the matter to the Election Commission. The Election Commission conducted a hearing on the matter and found that under Article 191 of the Constitution, no MLA can hold the post of profit under the Center or any State Government. While Singh was also getting salary from the government as MLA and was also making profit from government contracting. In such a situation, the Election Commission recommended the Governor suspend him. In March 2015, Governor Ram Naik cancelled his assembly membership.

In 17th Legislative Assembly of Uttar Pradesh (2017) elections, he again contested from Pharenda on BJP's ticket and he was elected MLA for third time continuously by defeating Indian National Congress candidate Virendra Chaudhary by a margin of 2,354 votes.

== Posts held ==
#	From	To	Position/Member
1	May 2007	March 2012	Member, 15th Legislative Assembly of Uttar Pradesh
2	2008	2009	Member, Joint Committee on Housing
3	2009	2010	Member, Parliamentary Research, Reference and Studies Committee
4	2010	2011	Member, Public Sector Undertaking and Corporation Joint Committee
5	March 2012	March 2015	Member, 16th Legislative Assembly of Uttar Pradesh
6	2012	2013	Member, Parliamentary Research, Reference and Studies Committee
7	March 2017	March 2022	Member, 17th Legislative Assembly of Uttar Pradesh
