= Sohas =

Sohas uska arindam
- village
- Location in Uttar Pradesh, India Sohas (India)
- Coordinates: 27°2′24″N 83°27′26″E
- Country: India
- State: Uttar Pradesh
- District: Maharajganj

Languages
  - Official: Hindi
- Time zone: UTC+5:30 (IST)
- PIN: 273303
- Nearest city: Maharajganj

Sohas (Uska) is a village of Maharajganj District, Uttar Pradesh. It is located in Paniyaraa legislative assembly seat. It is at a distance of 10 km north form Paniyara and ~10 km south of Maharajganj Town. The main profession of the villagers is Agriculture.
