= Barohiya =

Coordinates: 26°53′N 84°35′E

Barohiya is a village in Maharajganj District of Uttar Pradesh. It is 18 kilometres (11 mi) from Maharajganj township.
