= Samardhira =

Coordinates: 27.187°N 83.393°E

Samardhira is a village in Nautanwa tehsil, Maharajganj district, Gorakhpur Division, Uttar Pradesh, India.

== Geography ==
Jhamat Halt railway station and Purandarpur railway station are closest to Samardhira; Gorakhpur railway station is 53 km distant. Samardhira is connected by road from Gorakhpur, Maharajganj, and Nautanwa. Kathwaliya Sarjeet (3 km), Purandarpur Sonbarsa (3 km), Devpur (4 km), Pipra Khalli (5 km), and Gauharpur (5 km) are the closest villages to Samardhira. It is also located 19 km west of the district capital, Mahrajganj; 16 km from Lakshmipur; and 287 km from the state capital, Lucknow.

== Demographics ==
In 2001, the population was 3128, split as 1623 male and 1505 female.
