= Baraipar =

- Village
- Location in Uttar Pradesh, India Baraipar (India)
- Coordinates: 27°.035346′N 83°.218191′E
- Country: India
- State: Uttar Pradesh
- District: Gorakhpur

Population
  - Total: 4,582

Languages
  - Official: Hindi, Bhojpuri
- Time zone: UTC+5:30 (IST)
- PIN: 273158
- Vehicle registration: UP53
- Nearest city: Gorakhpur
- Sex ratio: 1000/921 ♂/♀
- Lok Sabha constituency: Gorakhpur
- Vidhan Sabha constituency: Campierganj
- Avg. annual temperature: 25 °C (77 °F)
- Avg. summer temperature: 40 °C (104 °F)
- Avg. winter temperature: 15 °C (59 °F)

Baraipar is a Village in the province of Uttar Pradesh in northern India and located approximately 40 kilometres north of Gorakhpur city near the border with Nepal on state highway-64 and National Highway-29 (NH-29) near Tahasil Campierganj in Gorakhpur District and also near to east to the river bank of Rapti and South of Sarua Tal (lake). There are two famous temple, 1. Haththi maa ka Mandir and Saruaa ki 2. Samay (Time: that never wait)Mata ki mandir There is a primary school, a Senior secondary school, a primary health center and a farmer help center (Fertilizer/ seeds) of Government of India. Broad gauge trains of Indian Railways running, between Gorakhpur and Nautanwa/ Gonda passes through Campierganj 7 km away from this village. Also, the nearest market place to this village is Campierganj, Pharenda, Dhani bazar, Pipeeganj, Paniara and Mehdaval Bazar, in range of 20 km.
