= Gorakhpur–Nautanwa Express =

Express train in India

Gorakhpur - Nautanwa Express
Overview
- Service type: Express
- Current operator: Northern Eastern Railway

Route
- Termini: Gorakhpur Junction (GKP); Nautanwa (NTV)
- Stops: 3
- Distance travelled: 82.4 km (51 mi)
- Average journey time: 2h 40m
- Service frequency: Six days (Note: Runs six days in a week for every direction.)
- Train number: 15019/15020

On-board services
- Class: General Unreserved
- Seating arrangements: No
- Sleeping arrangements: Yes
- Catering facilities: No
- Entertainment facilities: No
- Baggage facilities: No
- Other facilities: Below the seats

Technical
- Rolling stock: ICF coach
- Track gauge: 1,676 mm (5 ft 6 in)
- Operating speed: 31 km/h (19 mph), including halts

The Gorakhpur - Nautanwa Express is an Express train belonging to North Eastern Railway zone that runs between Gorakhpur Junction and Nautanwa in India. It is currently being operated with 15019/15020 train numbers on six days in a week basis.

== Service ==
The 15019/Gorakhpur - Nautanwa Express has an average speed of 31 km/h and covers 82.4 km in 2h 40m. The 15020/Nautanwa - Gorakhpur Express has an average speed of 35 km/h and covers 82.4 km in 2h 20m.

== Route and halts ==
The important halts of the train are:

- Gorakhpur Junction
- Peppeganj
- Anandnagar Junction
- Lachmipur
- Nautanwa

== Coach composite ==
The train has standard ICF rakes with a max speed of 110 kmph. The train consists of 12 coaches:

- 10 General Unreserved
- 2 Seating cum Luggage Rake

== Traction ==
Both trains are hauled by a Gonda Loco Shed based WDM 3 or WDP-4D diesel locomotive from Gorakhpur to Nautanwa and vice versa.

== Rake sharing ==
The train shares its rake with 15105/15106 Chhapra - Gorakhpur Intercity Express.

== See also ==
- Chhapra - Gorakhpur Intercity Express
- Gorakhpur Junction railway station
- Nautanwa railway station
