= Sohagi Barwa Wildlife Sanctuary =

Wildlife sanctuary in Uttar Pradesh, India

Coordinates: 27.31°N 83.56°E

Sohagi Barwa Sanctuary
- IUCN category IV (habitat/species management area)
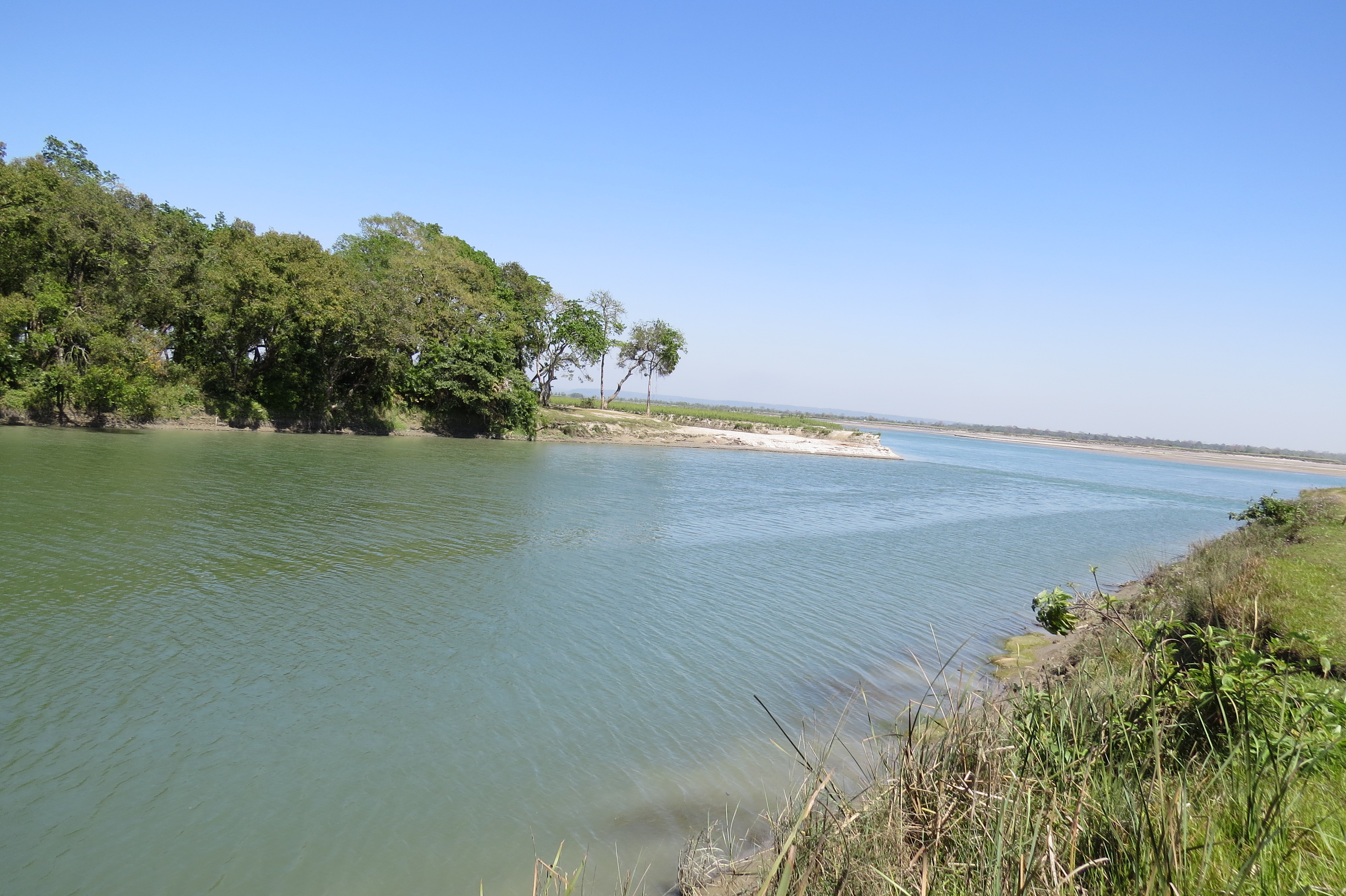
- Gandaki River in Sohagi Barwa Wildlife Sanctuary

- Location within Uttar Pradesh Location within India
- Interactive map of Sohagi Barwa Sanctuary
- Location: Maharajganj district, Uttar Pradesh
- Area: 428.2 km^{2} (165.3 sq mi)

Sohagi Barwa Wildlife Sanctuary is in the Maharajganj district in Uttar Pradesh state of India. It covers 428.2 km^{2} (165.3 sq mi), located on the west Bank of the Gandaki River, near the border with Nepal.The river Rohin flows through it. Sohagi Barwa is one of the tiger habitats of in Uttar Pradesh. SBWS is divided into seven forest ranges, namely; Pakdi, Madhwaliya, Laxmipur, North Chouk, South Chouk, Seopur and Nichlaul ranges with 21 grasslands. The sanctuary is home to diverse flora and fauna, including tigers. The "Magarmach Prajnan Kendra" (Crocodile Conservation Center) of Maharajganj is also present in Darjiniya Tal of Nichlaul range of Sohgi barva wildlife sanctuary.Asia's first forest tramway (1925–1983) was also operated from the Lakshmipur station here to carry timber to a distance of 40 km in the Sohagi Barwa forest.

The terrain of the sanctuary is mostly flat, with an average altitude of 100 meters. The climate is temperate and mild throughout the year, winters are also temperate.

== Location ==
The nearest railhead is Siswa Bazar, at a distance of 22 km. From district and Lachhmipur which are 3 km far away from Sohgi barva jungle and 40 km from district head
