= Khushal Nagar railway station =

Railway station in Uttar Pradesh, India

Khushal Nagar

General information
- Location: Mangalpur Pathkauli, Khushal Nagar, Maharajganj district, Uttar Pradesh; India
- Coordinates: 26°59′16″N 83°41′54″E
- Elevation: 89 m (292 ft)
- System: Passenger train station
- Owner: Indian Railways
- Operator: North Eastern Railway
- Line: Muzaffarpur–Gorakhpur main line
- Platforms: 2
- Tracks: 1

Construction
- Structure type: Standard (on ground station)

Other information
- Status: Active
- Station code: KSNR
- Zone(s): North Eastern Railway zone
- Division(s): Varanasi

History
- Opened: 1930s

Services
Preceding station	Indian Railways	Following station
Kaptanganj Junction towards ?	North Eastern Railway zone Muzaffarpur–Gorakhpur main line	Ghughuli towards ?
Location

Khushal Nagar railway station is a railway station on Muzaffarpur–Gorakhpur main line under the Varanasi railway division of North Eastern Railway zone. This is situated at Mangalpur Pathkauli, Khushal Nagar in Maharajganj district of the Indian state of Uttar Pradesh.
