= Supriya Shrinate =

Indian politician (born 1977)

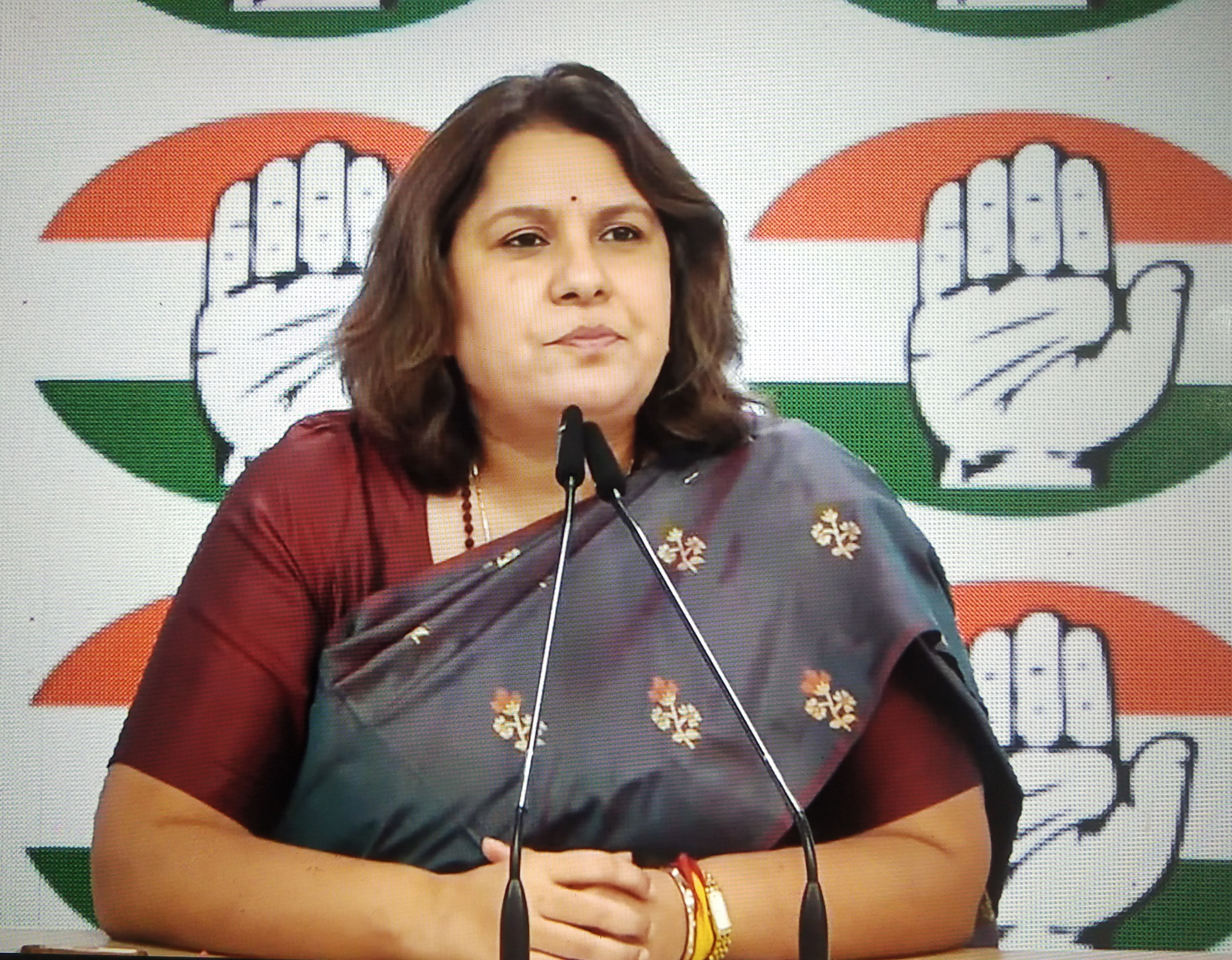
- Supriya shrinate during press conference in 2025

Chairperson of All India Congress Committee (Social Media & Digital Platforms Department)
- Incumbent
- Assumed office 20 June 2022
- Preceded by: Rohan Gupta

Personal details
- Born: 27 October 1977 (age 48) Mahrajganj, Uttar Pradesh, India
- Party: Indian National Congress
- Parent: Harsh Vardhan (father)
- Occupation: Politician; Journalist; Spokesperson

Supriya Shrinate (born 27 October 1977), also known as Supriya Srinet, is an Indian politician and former journalist who is a national spokesperson for the Indian National Congress. She contested the 2019 Indian general election (Lok Sabha election) from Maharajganj constituency and lost.

Shrinate worked for 18 years as a journalist. She began her career with Business Today and later joined NDTV Profit as an assistant editor. She was working as an executive editor for ET Now of The Times Group when she became active in politics.

== Early life and education ==
Shrinate is the daughter of former MP Harsh Vardhan from the Congress and Vishnu Singh. She was educated at the Loreto Convent Lucknow. She then graduated with a Master of Arts in History from the University of Delhi. Supriya’s husband is Dhirendra Singh. He works in a private company.

== Journalism ==
Shrinate worked for 18 years as a journalist in print and electronic media. In 2001, she began her career as a business journalist with Business Today as a special correspondent.

In 2004, she joined NDTV Profit as a correspondent, and was promoted to assistant editor. In 2008, she joined ET Now as the Chief Editor of News. Later that same year, she was named the Policy Editor and the Executive Editor for ET Now.

== Politics ==
In 2019, she resigned from her post as an executive editor in ET Now to contest the 2019 Indian general election. She contested the Maharajganj constituency as an Indian National Congress candidate and lost to Pankaj Choudhary of BJP, coming in third with 72,516 votes and 5.91% of the vote and her deposit was forfeited since she was unable to secure enough votes. This was the same constituency from which her father Harsh Vardhan had earlier been an MP. According to her 2019 Lok Sabha election nomination filing, she has a net worth of 8.5 crores.

In 2019, she was appointed as the spokesperson of the All India Congress Committee. She participated in TV debates as Congress spokesperson.

She also participated in the UP Assembly Elections 2022 as a star campaigner of the Indian National Congress. Congress won only 2% of the popular vote in this election.

In 2022, Shrinate was appointed Chairman of Social Media & Digital Platforms of the Indian National Congress. Shrinate is mostly in news for her on-screen dual with fellow commentators.
