= Maharajganj Lok Sabha constituency =

Maharajganj Lok Sabha constituency may refer to:

- Maharajganj, Bihar Lok Sabha constituency
- Maharajganj, Uttar Pradesh Lok Sabha constituency
