= SBZ =

SBZ or sbz may refer to:

- SBZ, the IATA airport code for Sibiu International Airport, Romania
- SBZ, the Indian Railways station code for Siswa Bazar railway station, Uttar Pradesh, India
- sbz, the ISO 639-3 language code for Sara Kaba language, Central African Republic and Chad
- Sowjetische Besatzungszone (SBZ), the German name for the Soviet occupation zone in Germany
  - West Germany's government used this term to refer to East Germany (see East Germany#Etymology)
