= KZA =

KZA or kza may refer to:

- KZA, the Indian Railways station code for Khadda railway station, Uttar Pradesh, India
- kza, the ISO 639-3 code for Syer-Tenyer language, Burkina Faso
