= Gauriram Gupta =

Indian Independence activist

Member of the Uttar Pradesh Legislative Assembly
- In office 1952-1969
- Preceded by: New constituency
- Succeeded by: Pyari
- Constituency: Pharenda

Personal details
- Party: Indian National Congress
- Spouse: Pyari Devi

Gauriram Gupta was an Indian Independence activist and politician and member of First Legislative Assembly of Uttar Pradesh. He was three-time Member of Legislative Assembly from 1952 to 1957, and 1967–1969, represented Pharenda (Assembly constituency). He died at the age of 78. MLA Pyari Devi Agrahari was his wife.

== See also ==
- First Legislative Assembly of Uttar Pradesh
