= Pharenda =

Pharenda Anand Nagar
- Town
- Location in Uttar Pradesh, India Pharenda (India)
- Coordinates: 27°06′N 83°17′E
- Country: India
- State: Uttar Pradesh
- Founder: Seth Anandram Jaipuria
- Elevation: 88 m (289 ft)

Population
  - Total: 10,113

Languages
  - Official: Hindi

Languages
- Time zone: UTC+5:30 (IST)
- Postal code: 273155
- Vehicle registration: 56

Pharenda, or Anandnagar, is a city in the Maharajganj district of the province of Uttar Pradesh in northern India. It is located approximately 44 kilometres north of Gorakhpur near the border with Nepal. District of Pharenda is Maharajganj. This is situated on the Buddhist Circuit which is built from Sarnath to Lumbini. It lies on NH-24 and near NH 29. It is about 45 km from Gorakhpur, 40 km from Siddharthnagar, 30 km from Maharajganj and 55 km from Sonauli, Indo-Nepal border. This place is named after Seth Anandram Jaypuriya. There is closed sugar Mill which was started in about 1935 and closed in 1995. Near Anand Nagar there is a temple is Durga devi mandir, popularly known as Lehara Devi mandir.

There are 9 intermediate schools, 2 degree colleges and 2 PG colleges in the town.

Forest of Pharenda has the "Barahsingha Reserve". Other, nearest market place to this tahsil is Dhani Bazar, Brijmanganj, Raniyapur and Campierganj (Chaumukha) (on the name of British "station master" of this railway station), in range of 12 km. Pharenda is a large city in Maharajganj district in the state of Uttar Pradesh, India. It is situated near NH 24. It is about 45 km from Gorakhpur, 40 km from Siddharthnagar, 30 km from Maharajganj and 55 km from Sonauli Indo-Nepal border. This place is named after Seth Anand Ram Jaipuriya.

== Geography ==
Anandnagar is located at 27.1°N 83.28°E. It has an average elevation of 88 metres (288 feet).

== Demographics ==
As of 2001 India census, Anandnagar had a population of 10,181. Males constitute 53% of the population and females 47%. Anandnagar has an average literacy rate of 72%, higher than the national average of 59.5%; with 57% of the males and 43% of females literate. 15% of the population is under 6 years of age.

Anandnagar is a Nagar Panchayat city in district of Maharajganj, Uttar Pradesh. The Anandnagar city is divided into 11 wards for which elections are held every 5 years. The Anandnagar Nagar Panchayat has population of 10,113 of which 5,303 are males while 4,810 are females as per report released by Census India 2011.

The population of children aged 0-6 is 1194 which is 11.81% of total population of Anandnagar (NP). In Anandnagar Nagar Panchayat, the female sex ratio is 907 against state average of 912. Moreover, the child sex ratio in Anandnagar is around 892 compared to Uttar Pradesh state average of 902. literacy rate of Anandnagar city is 88.41% higher than the state average of 67.68%. In Anandnagar, male literacy is around 92.96% while the female literacy rate is 83.40%.

Anandnagar Nagar Panchayat has total administration over 1,600 houses to which it supplies basic amenities like water and sewerage. It is also authorize to build roads within Nagar Panchayat limits and impose taxes on properties coming under its jurisdiction.

== Education ==
Anandnagar has many undergraduate and post graduate colleges and schools. SAJIC is the oldest Intermediate college of Anandnagar established in 1943 where the students gets quality education with great sports facilities. Other colleges are LBS Intercollege (coeducational), GGIC for girls and MRD intercollege coeducational.SAJIC Anand Nagar are famous colleges.

== Transport ==
There is a large railway station ANDN. Railway station named Anandnagar junction, from here one railway line goes to Nautanwa which is nearest railway station for sonauli Nepal border and another goes towards Lucknow via Barhani. Now, There are direct trains to connect all big cities like, Delhi, Mumbai, Raipur and Varanasi. The bus connects to Sonouli Nepal border and long route bus also available for Delhi, Lucknow, Jaipur.
