= National Highway 730S (India) =

National Highway in India

National Highway 730S

Route information
- Auxiliary route of NH 30
- Length: 40 km (25 mi)

Major junctions
- South end: NH 730 in Mahrajganj
- North end: F9 in Thuthibari (Indo / Nepal Border)

Location
- Country: India
- States: Uttar Pradesh

Highway system
- Roads in India; Expressways; National; State; Asian
← NH 730	→ NH 730S

National Highway 730S, commonly referred to as NH 730S is a national highway in India. It is a secondary route of National Highway 30. NH-730S runs in the state of Uttar Pradesh in India.

== Route ==
NH730S connects Mahrajganj, Nichlaul and Thuthibari on Indo/Nepal Border in the state of Uttar Pradesh.

== See also ==
- List of national highways in India
- List of national highways in India by state
