= Jagannath Mandir, Badahra Mahant =

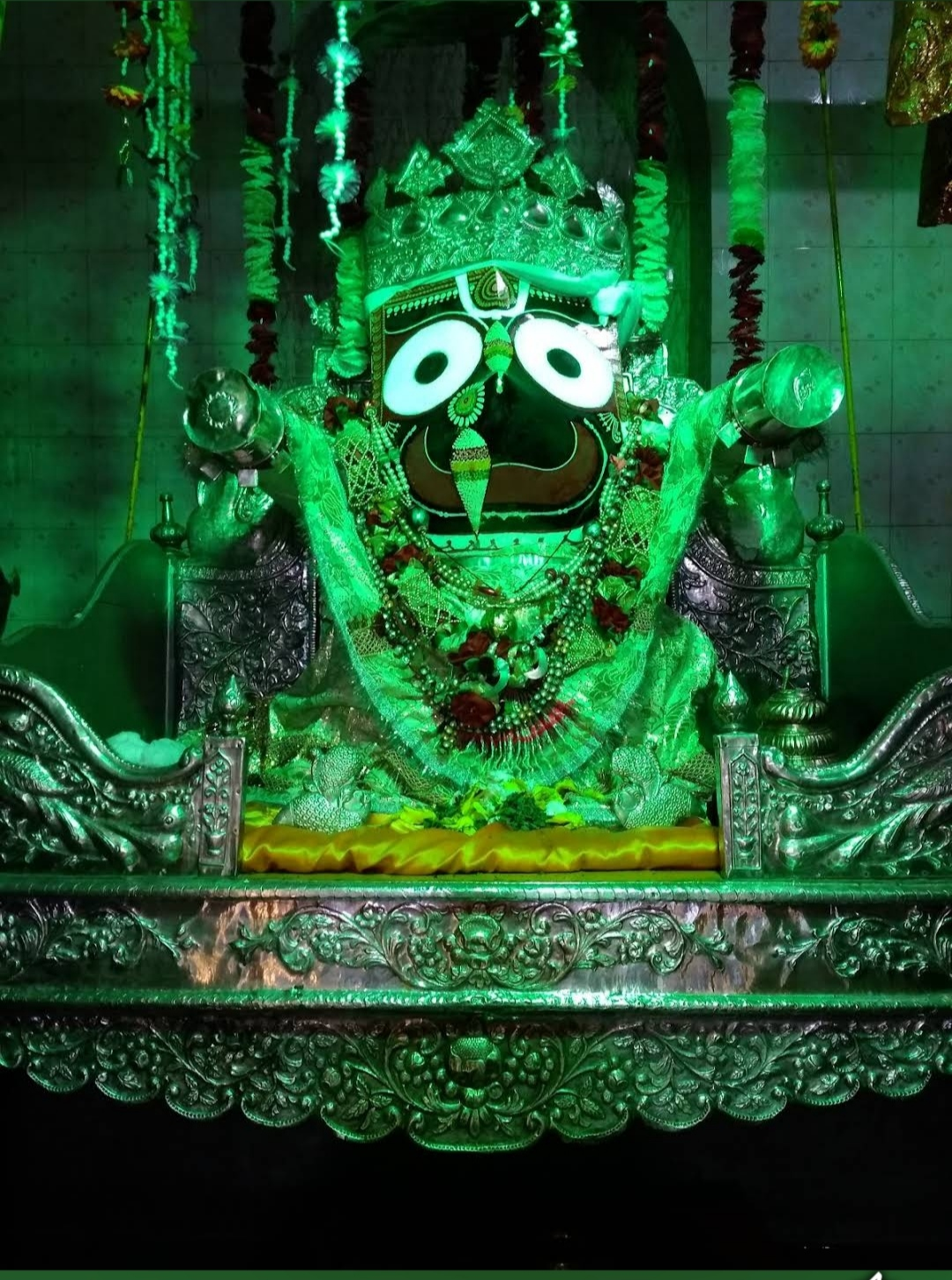

- Location within Uttar Pradesh Location within India Location within Asia Location within Earth

Religion
- Affiliation: Hinduism
- District: Maharajganj district
- Deity: Temple of ancient Lord Jagannath(Shri Krishna)
- Festivals: Sri Ramanavami; Chandan Yatra; Lord Jagannath Rath Yatra; Jhulotsav; Shri krishna Janmashtami; Vijaya Dashmi; Every Tuesday and Saturday is the discourse and kirtan etc.

Location
- Location: Badahra Mahant
- State: Uttar Pradesh
- Country: India
- Interactive map of Jagannath Mandir, Badahra Mahant
- Coordinates: 27.137195°N 83.700909°E

Architecture
- Established: 1786

The Temple of ancient Lord Jagannath (Shri Krishna) which is the center of faith in this region of Eastern Uttar Pradesh. This temple is located on the right bank of the canal Narayani at 12 km from the Shikarpur situated on the Gorakhpur-Maharajganj Road, in the village of Badahra Mahant.

Bhagwan Jagannath also known is Thakur Ji.

== History ==
The Temple of ancient Lord Jagannath (Shri Krishna) in Badahra Mahant of Maharajganj District holds significance as Vaishnava Ramanujdas, guided by a dream, established the deity's vigilance there in 1786. The temple, initially in a forested area under Nepalese governance, gained prominence after Ramanujdas' penance. Following the king's request to restore Jagannath's vigilance, a grand temple was built, and regular worship ceremonies are conducted, including festivals.

== The Spiritual Legacy Of Jagannath Mandir ==
It's fascinating to learn about the rich history and significance of the temple in Badahra Mahant. The dream of Vaishnava Ramanujdas and the subsequent establishment of Lord Jagannath's vigilance adds a spiritual depth to the temple's heritage. The regular celebrations and events contribute to the vibrant religious life in the region.

== See also ==
- Badahra Mahant
- Jagannath Temple, Puri
- List of Jagannath Temples outside Puri
