= Badahra Mahant =

Village in Uttar Pradesh, Indoa

Badahra Mahant Badhra Mahant, Barahra Mahanth,
- Village
- Location in Uttar Pradesh, India Badahra Mahant (India) Badahra Mahant (Asia) Badahra Mahant (Earth)
- Coordinates: 27.1368°N 83.7011°E
- Country: India
- State: Uttar Pradesh
- Division: Gorakhpur
- District: Maharajganj district
- Elevation: 89 m (292 ft)

Languages
  - Official: Hindi
- Time zone: UTC+5:30 (IST)
- PIN: 273163
- Vehicle registration: UP 56

Badahra Mahant also known as Badhra Mahant or Barahra Mahanth is a village in Uttar Pradesh. A temple dedicated to Lord Jagannath (Shri Krishna) exists in the village. The village is located towards east of Uttar Pradesh in northern India, near the border with Nepal.

== See also ==
- Jagannath Mandir, Badahra Mahant
- Maharajganj District
