= Nautanwa railway station =

Railway Station in Uttar Pradesh, India

- Indian Railways logo

General information
- Location: NH 24, Nautanwa, Uttar Pradesh; India
- Coordinates: 27.4251°N 83.4201°E
- Elevation: 101 metres (331 ft)
- System: Indian Railways station
- Owner: Indian Railways
- Operator: North Eastern Railway
- Platforms: 2
- Tracks: 6 (Single diesel BG)
- Connections: Auto stand

Construction
- Structure type: Standard (on-ground station)
- Parking: Yes
- Cycle facilities: Yes

Other information
- Status: Functioning
- Station code: NTV
- Zone(s): North Eastern Railway
- Division(s): Lucknow NER
Location
- Location within India Location within Uttar Pradesh

Nautanwa railway station is a small railway station in Maharajganj district, Uttar Pradesh. Its code is NTV. It serves Nautanwa city. The station consists of two platforms. The platforms are not well sheltered. It lacks many facilities including water and sanitation.

The station is close to Lumbini in Nepal and it is the last station in India. The two countries have an open border without restrictions on the movement of Nepalese and Indian nationals. There is a customs checkpoint for goods and third-country nationals.

== Trains ==
Some of the trains that run from Nautanwa are:

- Gorakhpur–Nautanwa Passenger
- Durg–Nautanwa Express (via Varanasi)
- Gorakhpur–Nautanwa Express
- Durg–Nautanwa Express (via Sultanpur)
