= Mahrajganj, Uttar Pradesh =

Town in Uttar Pradesh, India

Mahrajganj
- Town
- Location in Uttar Pradesh, India Mahrajganj (India) Mahrajganj (Asia)
- Coordinates: 27°8′40.623″N 83°33′41.1″E
- Country: India
- State: Uttar Pradesh
- District: Maharajganj

Area
  - Total: 16 km^{2} (6.2 sq mi)

Population (2011)
  - Total: 33,930
  - Density: 2,100/km^{2} (5,500/sq mi)

Language
  - Official: Hindi
  - Additional official: Urdu
  - Regional language: Bhojpuri
- Time zone: UTC+5:30 (IST)
- Postal code: 273303
- Vehicle registration: UP-56
- Website: www.nppmrj.in

Maharajganj is a town and municipal board in the Indian state of Uttar Pradesh. It serves as the headquarters of Maharajganj district.

== Demographics ==
According to the 2011 Indian Census, Maharajganj had a population of 33,930, of which 17,656 were males and 16,274 were females.

As of the 2001 Census of India, Mahrajganj had a population of 26,272. Males constitute 53% of the population and females 47%. Mahrajganj has an average literacy rate of 56%, lower than the national average of 59.5%: male literacy is 67%, and female literacy is 45%. In Mahrajganj, 18% of the population is under 6 years of age.

=== Religion ===
At 85.16%, majority of the population are adherents of Hinduism, while Islam is followed by 13.96%.

== Places of interest ==
The Sohagi Barwa Wildlife Sanctuary is located in Maharajganj district of eastern Uttar Pradesh and is part of one of WWF-India’s priority tiger landscapes, the Terai Arc Landscape. The sanctuary is home to a diverse variety of flora and fauna including tigers. A part of the Sanctuary is contiguous with the Valmiki Tiger Reserve of Bihar.

Earlier, to help the staff of the Sanctuary undertake regular patrols and control wildlife crime, WWF-India, in partnership with Aircel Ltd. had donated a Bolero Camper vehicle.

Later, on request of Divisional Forest Officer (DFO), Sohagibarwa Wildlife Division, Uttar Pradesh, WWF-India organised a two-day training from 13–14 June 2012 for the frontline staff of the division. Dr. Rakesh Kumar Singh, Senior Coordinator, Capacity Building, WWF-India, undertook the training in which a total of 70 frontline staff attended. Apart from the frontline staff, all the three sub-divisional forest officers (SDOs) and the Divisional Forest Officer (DFO) also attended the training.

== Transport ==
=== By road ===
NH-730 and NH-730S are two major national highways passing through Mahrajganj. There is an operational bus station in the city operated by UPSRTC.

=== By rail ===
The nearest railway station is Ghughuli railway station. Since the Mahrajganj does not have its own railway station, locals have to visit Gorakhpur Junction Railway station to catch train for major Indian cities like Delhi, Mumbai, Kolkata, Ahemdabad, Hyderabad and Bangalore etc. Although there is a railway line Anand Nagar Ghughuli via Maharajganj, proposed by Ministry of Railways which is expected to be operational by 2027.

=== By Air ===
The nearest domestic airport is Gorakhpur Airport which is approximately 60 kilometres from the Mahrajganj. Flights for major Indian cities like New Delhi, Mumbai, Kolkata, Ahemdabad, Hyderabad, Pune and Bangalore etc are available from Gorakhpur airport. The nearest international airport is Kushinagar International Airport which is currently non-functional. The nearest functional international airport is Gautam Budha International Airport Siddharthnagar, Nepal.

== Notable people ==
- Supriya Shrinate
- Pankaj Choudhary
- Shibban Lal Saxena
- Harsh Vardhan
- Jai Mangal Kanojiya
