= Siswa Bazar railway station =

Railway station in Uttar Pradesh, India

Siswa Bazar

General information
- Location: Siswa Bazar, Maharajganj district, Uttar Pradesh; India
- Coordinates: 27°08′58″N 83°45′23″E
- Elevation: 95 m (312 ft)
- System: Passenger train station
- Owner: Indian Railways
- Operator: North Eastern Railway
- Line: Muzaffarpur–Gorakhpur main line
- Platforms: 2
- Tracks: 3

Construction
- Structure type: Standard (on ground station)
- Parking: Yes

Other information
- Status: Active
- Station code: SBZ
- Zone(s): North Eastern Railway zone
- Division(s): Varanasi

History
- Opened: 1930s

Services
Preceding station	Indian Railways	Following station
Ghughuli towards ?	North Eastern Railway zone Muzaffarpur–Gorakhpur main line	Gurli Ramgarhwa towards ?
Location

Siswa Bazar railway station is a railway station on Muzaffarpur–Gorakhpur main line under the Varanasi railway division of North Eastern Railway zone. This is situated at Siswa Bazar in Maharajganj district of the Indian state of Uttar Pradesh.
