= Pharenda Assembly constituency =

Constituency of the Uttar Pradesh legislative assembly in India

Coordinates: 27.10°N 83.27°E

Pharenda
- Constituency No. 315 for the Uttar Pradesh Legislative Assembly

Constituency details
- Country: India
- Region: North India
- State: Uttar Pradesh
- District: Maharajganj
- Total electors: 211490
- Reservation: None

Member of Legislative Assembly
- 18th Uttar Pradesh Legislative Assembly
- Incumbent Virendra Chaudhary
- Party: INC
- Alliance: SP+
- Elected year: 2022

Pharenda is a constituency of the Uttar Pradesh Legislative Assembly covering the city of Pharenda in the Maharajganj district of Uttar Pradesh, India.

Pharenda is one of five assembly constituencies in the Maharajganj Lok Sabha constituency. Since 2008, this assembly constituency is numbered 315 amongst 403 constituencies.

== Members of Legislative Assembly ==
Year	Member	Party
1951	Gauri Ram	Indian National Congress
1967	Gauri Ram	Independent
1969	Pyari	Indian National Congress
1974	Lakshmi Narayan	Communist Party of India
1977	Shyam Narayan Tiwari	Communist Party of India
1980	Shyam Narayan Tiwari	Independent
1985	Harshwardhan Singh	Janata Party
1989	Shyam Narayan Tiwari	Indian National Congress
1991	Shyam Narayan Tiwari	Indian National Congress
1993	Chaudhary Shivendra Singh	Bharatiya Janata Party
1996	Vinod Mani	Communist Party of India (Marxist)
2002	Shyam Narayan Tiwari	Indian National Congress
2007	Bajrang Bahadur Singh	Bharatiya Janata Party
2012	Bajrang Bahadur Singh	Bharatiya Janata Party
2015^	Vinod Mani	Samajwadi Party
2017	Bajrang Bahadur Singh	Bharatiya Janata Party
2022	Virendra Chaudhary	Indian National Congress

== Election results ==
=== 2027 ===
2027 Uttar Pradesh Legislative Assembly election: Pharenda
Party	Candidate	Votes	%	±%
INDIA				
NDA				
BSP				
NOTA	None of the above			
Majority				
Turnout				
gain from		Swing		

=== 2022 ===
2022 Uttar Pradesh Legislative Assembly election: Pharenda
Party	Candidate	Votes	%	±%
INC	Virendra Chaudhary	85,181	40.28	+3.1
BJP	Bajrang Bahadur Singh	83,935	39.69	+1.33
BSP	Ishu Chaurasiya	21,665	10.24	−7.74
SP	Shankh Lal Manjhi	16,457	7.78	
NOTA	None of the above	1,484	0.7	−0.31
Majority		1,246	0.59	−0.59
Turnout		211,490	60.19	+0.55
INC gain from BJP		Swing		

=== 2017 ===
Bharatiya Janta Party candidate Bajrang Bahadur Singh won in last Assembly election of 2017 Uttar Pradesh Legislative Elections defeating Indian National Congress candidate Virendra Chaudhary by a margin of 2,354 votes.

2017 Assembly Elections: Pharenda
Party	Candidate	Votes	%	±%
BJP	Bajrang Bahadur Singh	76,312	38.36	
INC	Virendra Chaudhary	73,958	37.18	
BSP	Bechan	35,765	17.98	
RLD	Vijay Singh	2,742	1.38	
NISHAD	Raj Kumar Nishad	1,930	0.97	
AIMIM	Reena	1,878	0.94	
NOTA	None of the above	1,992	1.01	
Majority		2,354	1.18	
Turnout		198,945	59.64	
BJP gain from SP		Swing	▲0.99	

=== 2015 ===
2015 By Poll Elections: Pharenda
Party	Candidate	Votes	%	±%
SP	Vinod Mani	64,818	37.76	▲23.50
INC	Virendra Chaudhary	55,647	32.42	▲13.45
BJP	Bajrang Bahadur Singh	41,247	24.03	▼2.25
Independent	Vijay	5,720	3.33	Steady
	Remaining 3 Candidates	4,149	2.41	Steady
None of the Above	None of the Above	2,056	1.19	New
Majority		9,231	5.37	▼1.94
Turnout		1,71,641	53.02	▼6.96
Registered electors		3,23,726		
SP gain from BJP		Swing	▲11.48	

2012 Assembly Elections: Pharenda
Party	Candidate	Votes	%	±%
BJP	Bajrang Bahadur Singh	47,921	26.28	Steady
INC	Virendra Chaudhary	34,586	18.97	Steady
BSP	Parsuram	34,065	18.68	Steady
SP	Shyam Narayan	26,006	14.26	Steady
PECP	Ram Prakash Singh	23,438	12.86	Steady
	Remaining 15 Candidates	16,302	8.94	Steady
Majority		13,335	7.31	Steady
Turnout		1,82,318	59.98	Steady
BJP hold		Swing		
