= Virendra Chaudhary =

Indian politician

Leader of the Indian National Congress in Uttar Pradesh Legislative Assembly
- Incumbent
- Assumed office 2 October 2026
- Preceded by: Aradhana Mishra

Member of the Uttar Pradesh Legislative Assembly
- Incumbent
- Assumed office 2022
- Preceded by: Bajrang Bahadur Singh
- Constituency: Pharenda

Personal details
- Party: INC
- Education: B.E. (Civil)
- Alma mater: Sidda Ganga Institute of Technology, Tumkur, Karnataka.
- Occupation: Agriculture, Politician

Virendra Chaudhary is an Indian politician and a member of the Indian National Congress from Uttar Pradesh. He is a MLA representing Pharenda constituency of Maharajganj district.

== Electoral Performances ==
Year	Election	Party	Constituency Name	Result	Votes gained	Vote share%	Margin	Ref
2007	15th Uttar Pradesh Legislative Assembly	BSP	Pharenda	Lost	31,413	22.54	8,914	
2012	16th Uttar Pradesh Legislative Assembly	INC	Pharenda	Lost	34,586	18.97	13,335	
2015 By Poll	16th Uttar Pradesh Legislative Assembly	INC	Pharenda	Lost	55,647	32.42	9,231	
2017	17th Uttar Pradesh Legislative Assembly	INC	Pharenda	Lost	73,958	37.18	2,354	
2022	18th Uttar Pradesh Assembly	INC	Pharenda	Won	85,181	40.28%	1,246	
