= Maharajganj, Uttar Pradesh Assembly constituency =

Constituency of the Uttar Pradesh legislative assembly in India

Coordinates: 27.15°N 83.56°E

Maharajganj
- Constituency No. 318 for the Uttar Pradesh Legislative Assembly

Constituency details
- Country: India
- Region: North India
- State: Uttar Pradesh
- District: Maharajganj
- Total electors: 386,617 (in 2017)
- Reservation: SC

Member of Legislative Assembly
- 18th Uttar Pradesh Legislative Assembly
- Incumbent Jai Mangal Kanojiya
- Party: Bharatiya Janta Party
- Elected year: 2022

Maharajganj is a constituency of the Uttar Pradesh Legislative Assembly covering the city of Maharajganj in the Maharajganj district of Uttar Pradesh, India.

Maharajganj is one of five assembly constituencies in the Maharajganj Lok Sabha constituency. Since 2008, this assembly constituency is numbered 318 amongst 403 constituencies.

== Members of the Legislative Assembly ==
Year	Member	Party
1952	Ram Swaroop Mishra	Indian National Congress
1952	Rameshwar Prasad	Indian National Congress
1957	Amarnath Mishra	Independent
1957	Duryodhan	Independent
1962	Duryodhan	Socialist Party (India)
1967	Duryodhan	Indian National Congress
1969	Hansraj	Bharatiya Kranti Dal
1974	Duryodhan	Indian National Congress
1977	Dukkhi Prasad	Independent
1980	Firangi Prasad Visharad	Janata Party (Secular)
1985	Ram Lakshan	Indian National Congress
1989	Keshav Prasad	Janata Dal
1991	Ram Pyare Azad	Bharatiya Janata Party
1993	Chandra Kishor	Bharatiya Janata Party
1996	Chandra Kishor	Bharatiya Janata Party
2002	Chandra Kishor	Bharatiya Janata Party
2007	Sripati Azad	Samajwadi Party
2012	Sudama Prasad	Samajwadi Party
2017	Jai Mangal Kanojiya	Bharatiya Janata Party
2022	Jai Mangal Kanojiya	Bharatiya Janata Party

== Election results ==
=== 2027 ===
2027 Uttar Pradesh Legislative Assembly election: Maharajganj
Party	Candidate	Votes	%	±%
INDIA				
NDA				
BSP				
NOTA	None of the above			
Majority				
Turnout				
gain from		Swing		

=== 2022 ===
2022 Uttar Pradesh Legislative Assembly election: Maharajganj
Party	Candidate	Votes	%	±%
BJP	Jay Mangal	136,071	51.8	▲1.17
Independent	Nirmesh Mangal	59,168	22.53	
SBSP	Geeta Ratna	22,395	8.53	
BSP	Omprakash	20,466	7.79	▼15.18
AIMIM	Jitendra	7,751	2.95	
INC	Alok Prasad	5,865	2.23	▼18.08
CPI	Ramkeval	2,814	1.07	▼0.5
NOTA	None of the above	2,848	1.08	▲0.03
Majority		76,903	29.27	▲1.61
Turnout		262,672	63.45	▼0.49
BJP hold		Swing		

=== 2017 ===
Bharatiya Janta Party candidate Jai Mangal Kanojiya won in 2017 Uttar Pradesh Legislative Elections defeating Bahujan Samaj Party candidate Nirmesh Mangal by a margin of 68,361 votes.

2017 Assembly Elections: Maharajganj (SC)
Party	Candidate	Votes	%	±%
BJP	Jai Mangal Kanojiya	125,154	50.63	
BSP	Nirmesh Mangal	56,793	22.97	
INC	Alok Prasad	50,217	20.31	
CPI	Ramkewal	3,886	1.57	
NISHAD	Sant Kirpal	3,604	1.46	
NOTA	None of the above	2,573	1.05	
Majority		68,361	27.66	
Turnout		247,216	63.94	
BJP gain from SP		Swing	▲12.05	

=== 2012 ===
2012 Assembly Elections: Maharajganj (SC)
Party	Candidate	Votes	%	±%
SP	Sudama	84,581	39.11	Steady
BSP	Nirmesh Mangal	48,426	22.39	Steady
BJP	Chandra Kishor	45,301	20.95	Steady
INC	Alok Prasad	15,972	7.38	Steady
PECP	Vishnu Dev	7,438	3.44	Steady
CPI	Ramkewal	3,572	1.65	Steady
	Remaining 10 Candidates	10,991	5.08	Steady
Majority		36,155	16.72	Steady
Turnout		2,16,281	61.27	Steady
SP hold		Swing		
