= Gyanendra Singh =

Indian politician (born 1954)

Member of the Legislative Assembly
- Incumbent
- Assumed office March 2017
- Preceded by: Deo Narayan Urf G.M. Singh
- Constituency: Paniyara (Assembly constituency)

Member of the Legislative Assembly of Shyamdeurawa
- In office October 1996 – May 2007 (2 Times)
- Preceded by: Ramadhar Yadav
- Succeeded by: Ramadhar Yadav
- In office June 1991 – December 1992
- Preceded by: Janardhan Prasad Ojha
- Succeeded by: Ramadhar Yadav

Personal details
- Born: 1 December 1954 (age 71) Rampur Chaubey, Kushinagar, Uttar Pradesh
- Party: Bharatiya Janata Party
- Parent: Chandrika Singh
- Education: High School
- Alma mater: Uttar Pradesh Board
- Occupation: MLA
- Profession: Politician; Farmer

Gyanendra Singh is an Indian politician and a member of the 18th Uttar Pradesh Assembly, in India. Since 2017, he represents the Paniyara (Assembly constituency) in Maharajganj district of Uttar Pradesh and is a member of the Bharatiya Janata Party. Earlier he was also a member in 11th, 13th and 14th Legislative Assembly of Uttar Pradesh from Shyamdeurawa (Assembly constituency), which was abolished after Delimitation order (2008).

== Early life and education ==
Singh was born 1 December 1954 in the Rampur Chaubey village in Kushinagar district of Uttar Pradesh to father Chandrika Singh. In 1972, he married Indumati Singh, they have one son and two daughters. He belongs to sainthwar-mall-kshatriya community. He attended Board of High School and Intermediate Education Uttar Pradesh and attained High School Certificate.

== Political career ==
Singh started his political career in 1988 as a Sarpanch. After this, he joined Bharatiya Janata Party. In 11th Legislative Assembly of Uttar Pradesh (1991) elections, he got ticket from Shyamdeurawa (Assembly constituency) and was elected MLA by defeating Janata Dal candidate Ramadhar Yadav by a lowest margin of 29 votes.

In 12th Legislative Assembly of Uttar Pradesh (1993) elections, he again contested from Shyamdeurawa but lost to Janata Dal candidate Ramadhar Yadav by a margin of 2,247 votes.

In 13th Legislative Assembly of Uttar Pradesh (1996) elections, he was again elected MLA from Shyamdeurawa by defeating Bahujan Samaj Party candidate Javed Ali by a margin of 14,920 votes.

In 14th Legislative Assembly of Uttar Pradesh (2002) elections, he was elected MLA for second time continuously from Shyamdeurawa by defeating Bahujan Samaj Party candidate Mehdi Hasan by a margin of 1,719 votes.

He also contested 15th Legislative Assembly of Uttar Pradesh (2007) elections, but lost to SP's Janaradan Prasad Ojha by a margin of 10,848 votes. After election, as per Delimitation order (2008) Shyamdeurawa constituency was abolished.

After abolition of the Shyamdeurawa constituency, in 16th Legislative Assembly of Uttar Pradesh (2012) elections he contested from Paniyara (Assembly constituency) but lost to BSP's Deo Narayan Singh by a margin of 4,083 votes.

In 17th Legislative Assembly of Uttar Pradesh (2017) elections, he again contested from Paniyara and was elected MLA by defeating Bahujan Samaj Party candidate Ganesh Shankar Pandey by a margin of 67,491 votes.

== Posts held ==
| # | From | To | Position | Constituency |
|---|---|---|---|---|
| 1 | March 2017 | Incumbent | Member, 17th Legislative Assembly of Uttar Pradesh | Paniyara |
| 2 | March 2002 | May 2007 | Member, 14th Legislative Assembly of Uttar Pradesh | Shyamdeurawa |
| 3 | October 1996 | March 2002 | Member, 13th Legislative Assembly of Uttar Pradesh | Shyamdeurawa |
| 4 | June 1991 | December 1992 | Member, 11th Legislative Assembly of Uttar Pradesh | Shyamdeurawa |
