= Ghughali =

Ghughuli Ghughuli
- Town
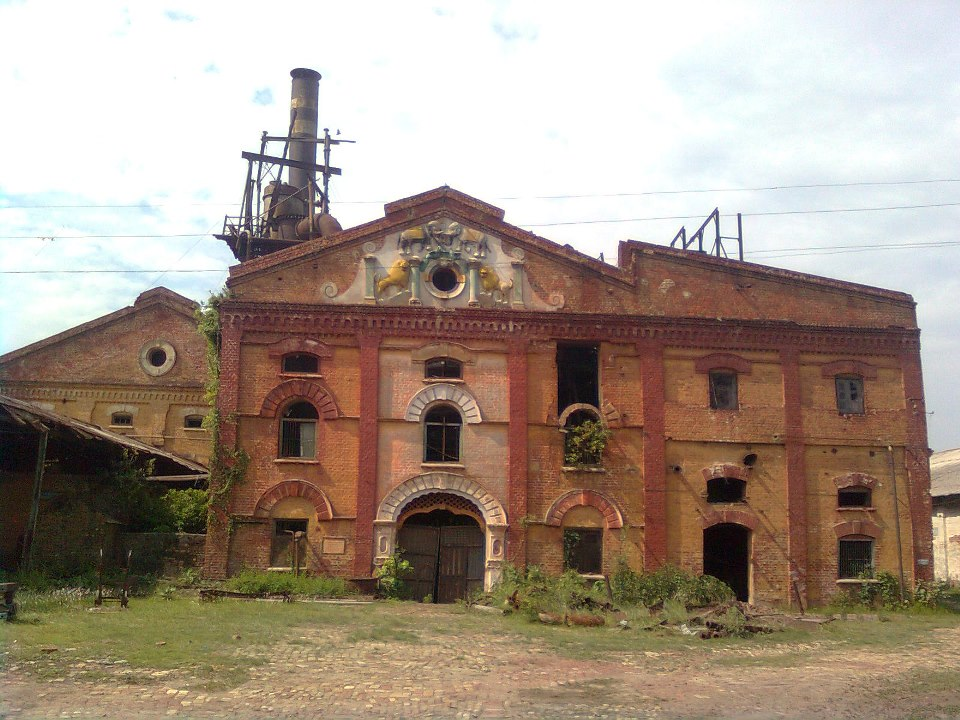

- Location in Uttar Pradesh, India
- Coordinates: 27°06′N 83°44′E
- Country: India
- State: Uttar Pradesh
- District: Maharajganj

Population (2011)
  - Total: 11,271

Languages
  - Official: Hindi, Bhojpuri
- Time zone: UTC+5:30 (IST)
- PIN: 273151
- Vehicle registration: Up56

Ghughuli is a town and nagar panchayat in Maharajganj district in the Indian state of Uttar Pradesh. It is near Gorakhpur and very close to the Indo-Nepal border. East of Ghughali is the Baikunthi River. The bank of the Baikunthi is used for performing last rites and the quarry is for river sand.

== Demographics ==
As of 2011, Ghughuli is divided into 11 wards for which elections are held every five years. The Ghughuli Nagar Panchayat has a population of 11,271, of which 5,693 are males while 5,578 are females as per report released by Census India 2011.

The population of children ages birth to age six is 1,374, which is 12.19% of the total population of Ghughuli. In Ghughuli Nagar Panchayat, the female sex ratio is 980 against a state average of 912. The number of children in Ghughuli is around 887 compared to Uttar Pradesh state average of 902. The literacy rate of Ghughuli city is 74.47%, which is higher than the state average of 67.68%. In Ghughuli, male literacy is around 84.03% while the female literacy rate is 64.84%.

Ghughuli Nagar Panchayat has a total administration of over 1,908 houses to which it supplies basic amenities like water and sewerage. It is also authorized to build roads within Nagar Panchayat limits and impose taxes on properties coming under its jurisdiction.

== Transport ==
Ghughuli railway station is situated on Muzaffarpur-Gorakhpur main line, under the Varanasi railway division.

== Economy ==
The basic source of income for the majority of citizens is agriculture.

== Languages ==
The basic language is Bhojpuri. Other languages include Hindi and English.

== Tourist Destinations ==
- KushiNagar – 51.4 km (2 hour drive)
- Kapilvastu (Nepal) – 60 km (2.5 hour drive)
- Gorakhsnath Temple – 54 km (1.5 hours by road, 45 minutes by express train)
- Lehra Devi Mandir- 45 km (2 hour drive)
- Itahiya shiv mandir- 30 km (2 hour by road)
