= Punwarka =

Village in India

Punwarka is a village situated in Saharanpur district in the Indian state of Uttar Pradesh. It is about 10 km from Saharanpur city. In 1961, it had a population of 1207. As of the 2011 census, it had 1260 households.

== Educational institutes ==
=== University ===
- Maa Shakumbhari University
