= Chhapra–Nautanwa Intercity Express =

Train in India

Chhapra Jn- Nautanwa Intercity Express
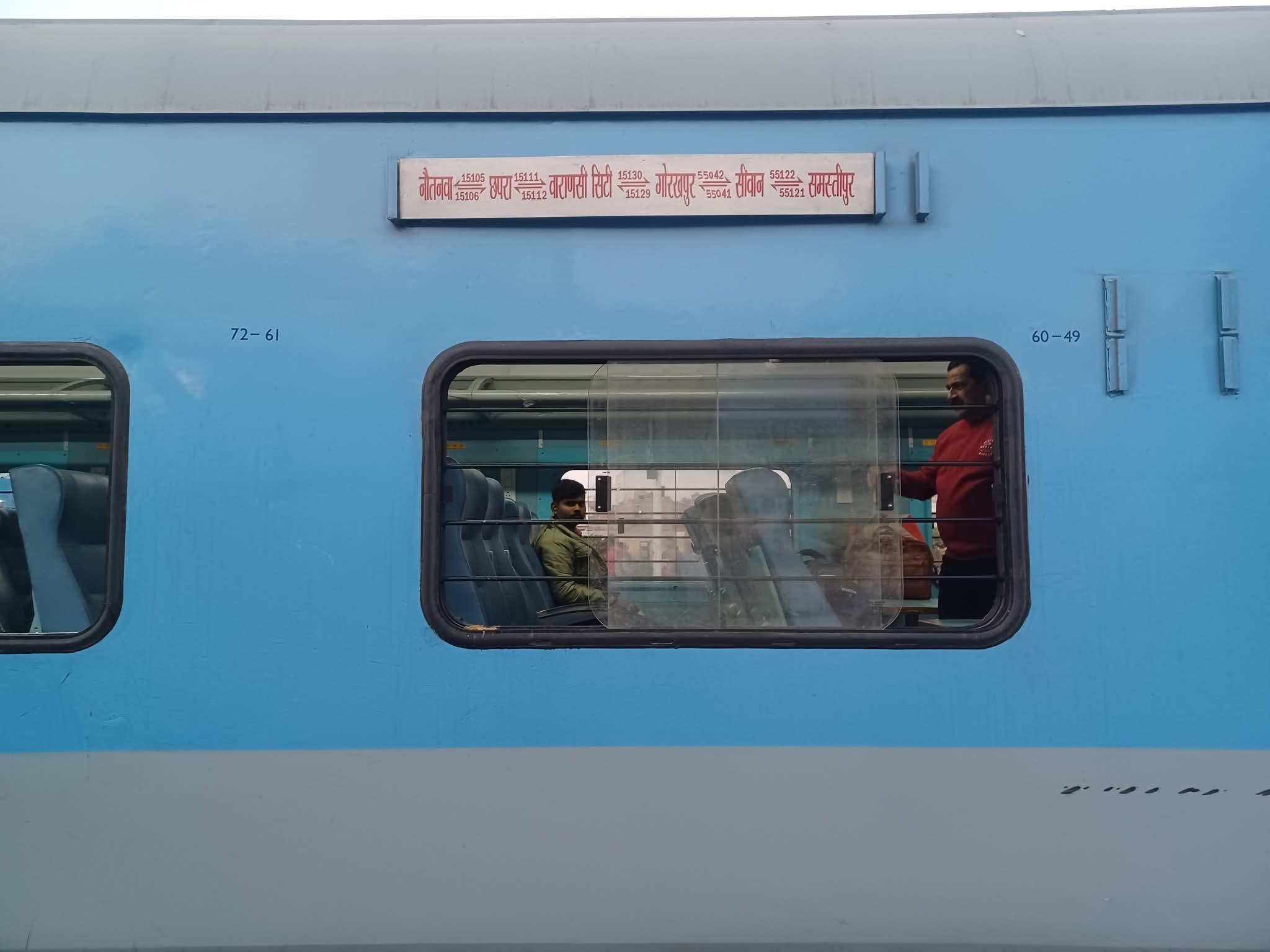

Overview
- Service type: Superfast
- Current operator: Northern Eastern Railway

Route
- Termini: Chhapra Junction; Nautanwa
- Stops: 13
- Distance travelled: 262 km (163 mi)
- Average journey time: 7 hours 17 mins
- Service frequency: Six days in a week
- Train number: 15105 / 15106

On-board services
- Class: UR/GEN
- Seating arrangements: Yes
- Sleeping arrangements: No
- Catering facilities: No
- Baggage facilities: Yes

Technical
- Rolling stock: ICF coach
- Track gauge: 1,676 mm (5 ft 6 in)
- Operating speed: 110 km/h (68 mph)

The 15105 / 15106 Chhapra Junction–Nautanwa Intercity Express is an Express train belonging to Indian Railways North Eastern Railway zone that runs between Chhapra Junction and Nautanwa in India.

It operates as train number 15105 from Chhapra Junction to Nautanwa and as train number 15106 in the reverse direction, serving the states of Bihar & Uttar Pradesh.

This train was running up to Gorakhpur Junction and after it was extended to Nautanwa on 1 July 2019.

== Coaches ==
The 15105 / 15106 Chhapra Junction–Nautanwa Intercity Express has 10 general unreserved & 2 SLR (seating with luggage rake) coaches . It does not carry a pantry car.

As is customary with most train services in India, coach composition may be amended at the discretion of Indian Railways depending on demand.

== Service ==
The 15105 Chhapra Junction–Nautanwa Intercity Express covers the distance of 180 km (112 mi) in 4 hours 05 mins (44 km/h) and in 4 hours 20 mins as the 15106 Gorakhpur Junction–Chhapra Junction Intercity Express (41 km/h).

As the average speed of the train is less than 55 km/h (34 mph), as per railway rules, its fare doesn't include an Express surcharge.

== Routing ==
The 15105 / 06 Chhapra Junction–Nautanwa Intercity Express runs from Chhapra Junction via Siwan Junction, Deoria Sadar, Gorakhpur Junction to Nautanwa.

== Traction ==
As the route is electrified, a Gonda Junction based WDM-3A diesel locomotive pulls the train to its destination.
