= Paniahwa railway station =

Railway station in Uttar Pradesh, India

Paniahwa

General information
- Location: Khadda-Chhitauni Road, Malhia, Kushinagar district, Uttar Pradesh; India
- Coordinates: 27°10′03″N 83°56′02″E
- Elevation: 96 m (315 ft)
- System: Passenger train station
- Owner: Indian Railways
- Operator: North Eastern Railway
- Line: Muzaffarpur–Gorakhpur main line
- Platforms: 2
- Tracks: 1

Construction
- Structure type: Standard (on ground station)

Other information
- Status: Active
- Station code: PNYA
- Zone(s): North Eastern Railway zone
- Division(s): Varanasi

History
- Opened: 1930s

Services
| Preceding station | Indian Railways | Following station |
|---|---|---|
| Khadda towards ? | North Eastern Railway zone Muzaffarpur–Gorakhpur main line | Valmikinagar Road towards ? |
Location

Paniahwa railway station is a railway station on Muzaffarpur–Gorakhpur main line under the Varanasi railway division of North Eastern Railway zone. This is situated beside Khadda-Chhitauni Road at Malhia in Kushinagar district of the Indian state of Uttar Pradesh.
