= Siswa Assembly constituency =

Assembly constituency in Uttar Pradesh

Coordinates: 27.15°N 83.76°E

Siswa
- Constituency No. 317 for the Uttar Pradesh Legislative Assembly

Constituency details
- Country: India
- Region: North India
- State: Uttar Pradesh
- District: Maharajganj
- Total electors: 3,89,369
- Reservation: None

Member of Legislative Assembly
- 18th Uttar Pradesh Legislative Assembly
- Incumbent Prem Sagar Patel
- Party: Bharatiya Janta Party
- Elected year: 2017

Siswa is a constituency of the Uttar Pradesh Legislative Assembly covering the city of Siswa in the Maharajganj district of Uttar Pradesh, India.

Siswa is one of five assembly constituencies in the Maharajganj Lok Sabha constituency. Since 2008, this assembly constituency is numbered 317 amongst 403 constituencies.

== Members of Legislative Assembly ==
Year	Member	Party
1967	Yadvendra Singh	Indian National Congress
1969	Yadvendra Singh	Indian National Congress
1974	Yadvendra Singh	Indian National Congress
1977	Sharda Prasad Jaiswal	Janata Party
1980	Yadvendra Singh	Indian National Congress (U)
1985	Shivendra Singh	Indian National Congress
1989	Jagdish Lal	Janata Dal
1991	Shivendra Singh	Indian National Congress
1993	Sharda Prasad Jaiswal	Bharatiya Janata Party
1996	Shivendra Singh	Bahujan Samaj Party
2002	Shivendra Singh	Bharatiya Janata Party
2007	Avnindranath Dwivedi	Bharatiya Janata Party
2012	Shivendra Singh	Samajwadi Party
2017	Prem Sagar Patel	Bharatiya Janata Party
2022	Prem Sagar Patel	Bharatiya Janata Party

== Election results ==
=== 2027 ===
2027 Uttar Pradesh Legislative Assembly election: Siswa
Party	Candidate	Votes	%	±%
INDIA				
NDA				
BSP				
NOTA	None of the above			
Majority				
Turnout				
gain from		Swing		

=== 2022 ===
Bharatiya Janta Party candidate Prem Sagar Patel won in last Assembly election of 2022 Uttar Pradesh Legislative Elections defeating Samajwadi Party candidate Rakesh Tebriwal by a margin of 62731 votes.

2022 Uttar Pradesh Legislative Assembly election: Siswa
Party	Candidate	Votes	%	±%
BJP	Prem Sagar Patel	127,673	50.05	−1.29
SP	Sushil Kumar Tibrewal	64,942	25.46	+2.61
BSP	Dhirendra Pratap Singh	33,498	13.13	−6.16
Independent	Ajay Kumar Srivastava	10,723	4.2	
Independent	Rakesh Kumar Mishra	7,521	2.95	
INC	Raju Kumar Gupta	4,260	1.67	
NOTA	None of the above	1,955	0.77	−0.29
Majority		62,731	24.59	−3.9
Turnout		255,079	65.51	+0.13
BJP hold		Swing		

=== 2017 ===
Bharatiya Janta Party candidate Prem Sagar Patel won in last Assembly election of 2017 Uttar Pradesh Legislative Elections defeating Samajwadi Party candidate Shivendra Singh by a margin of 68,186 votes.

2017 Uttar Pradesh Legislative Assembly Election: Sisw
Party	Candidate	Votes	%	±%
BJP	Premsagar Patel	122,884	51.34	
SP	Shivendra Singh Alias Shivbabu	54,698	22.85	
BSP	Raghvendra Pratap Alias Ankit Singh	46,185	19.29	
Independent	Rakesh Kumar Alias R. K. Mishra	4,073	1.7	
PECP	Yash Tripathi	2,659	1.11	
Independent	Manorama	2,301	0.96	
NOTA	None of the above	2,501	1.06	
Majority		68,186	28.49	
Turnout		239,366	65.38	
