= Ghughuli railway station =

Railway station in Uttar Pradesh, India

Ghughuli

General information
- Location: Ghughuli Bazar, Maharajganj district, Uttar Pradesh; India
- Coordinates: 27°03′14″N 83°42′50″E
- Elevation: 92 m (302 ft)
- System: Passenger train station
- Owner: Indian Railways
- Operator: North Eastern Railway
- Line: Muzaffarpur–Gorakhpur main line Ghughuli–Anandnagar JN. main line under construction
- Platforms: 2
- Tracks: 3
- Connections: This railway station is well connected with roads. Auto, taxis and other means of transportation are available to commute the station.

Construction
- Structure type: Standard (on ground station)
- Parking: Two wheelers and four wheelers parking lot is available for the commuters.

Other information
- Status: Active
- Station code: GH
- Zone(s): North Eastern Railway zone
- Division(s): Varanasi

History
- Opened: 1930s

Services
| Preceding station | Indian Railways | Following station |
|---|---|---|
| Khushal Nagar towards ? | North Eastern Railway zone Muzaffarpur–Gorakhpur main line | Siswa Bazar towards ? |
Location

Ghughuli railway station is a railway station on Muzaffarpur–Gorakhpur main line under the Varanasi railway division of North Eastern Railway zone. This is situated at Ghughuli Bazar in Maharajganj district of the Indian state of Uttar Pradesh.
