= Siswa Bazar =

- Village
- Location in Uttar Pradesh, India
- Coordinates: 27.09°N 83.46°E
- Country: India
- State: Uttar Pradesh
- Division: Gorakhpur
- District: Maharajganj district
- Elevation: 89 m (292 ft)

Population (2001)
  - Total: 18,920

Languages
  - Official: Hindi
- Time zone: UTC+5:30 (IST)
- PIN: 273153
- Telephone code: 915523
- Vehicle registration: UP
- Sex ratio: 1.07 ♂/♀

Siswa Bazar is a small Indian town towards the east of the province of Uttar Pradesh in northern India, near the border with Nepal.

== Geography ==
Near the Nepal and Bihar border, Siswa Bazar is located at 27.09°N 83.46°E. It has an average elevation of 89 metres (295 feet).

== Name ==
The name of the town came from the market of Shessham trees which came from the rivers in Nepal. Hence, its original name was "Shesshamwa ke bazar", but over the years, it became known as Siswa Bazar.

== Transport ==
Siswa Bazar railway station is situated on Muzaffarpur–Gorakhpur main line under the Varanasi railway division of North Eastern Railway zone.
