= Sonauli, Bihar =

Village in Chapara (Saran) District of Bihar, India

Coordinates: 26.062°N 84.747°E

Sonauli is a large village in the district of Saran, Chapra, Bihar. There is a canal on the west of the village. A small canal also runs through the border of the village in south. Many good roads run through the village. Roads in the village can be used in any season. There is a police station inthe village.

== Inhabitants ==
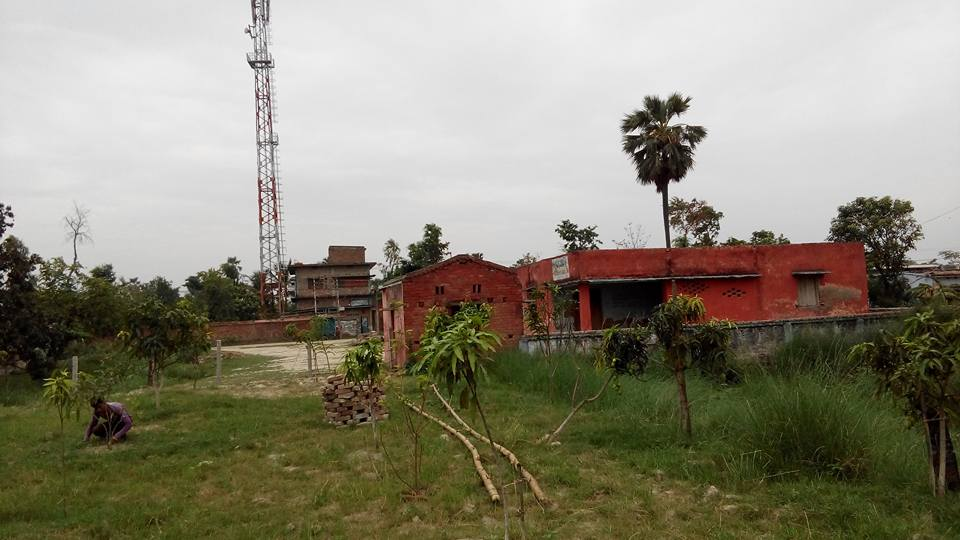
Sonauli Middle School

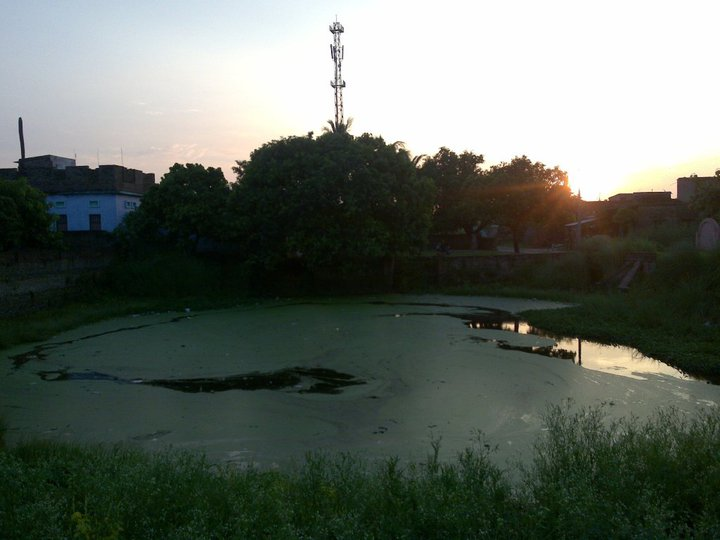
Sonauli Pond

About 5,000 people live in the village. People of different communities live there, including Hindus and Muslims. The Hindus live in the eastern part and the Muslims in the western part of the village. The latter are generally cultivators. Some of them are also traders and some hold service under the government. Most of the Hindus work in the service industry or in agriculture.

There are many educated including lawyers, doctors, professors. Many are also serving the defence forces (Army, Air Force, Navy). Many of them live in towns, and come to the village only during holidays. Chhath Puja and Eid are the main festivals of the village, and all villagers celebrate collectively.

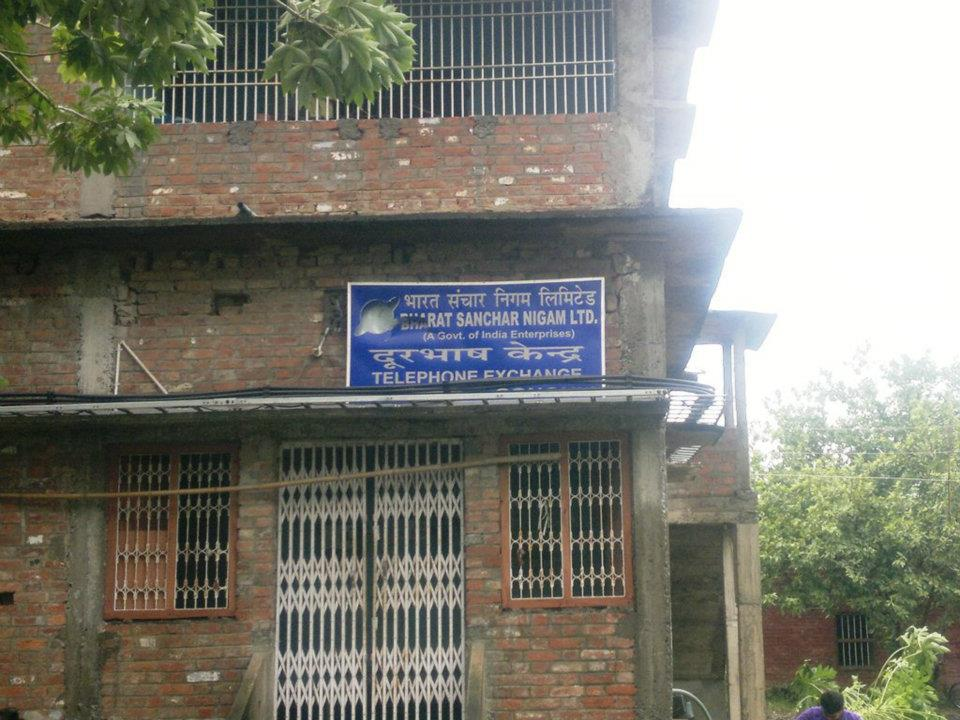
Sonauli Telephone Exchange

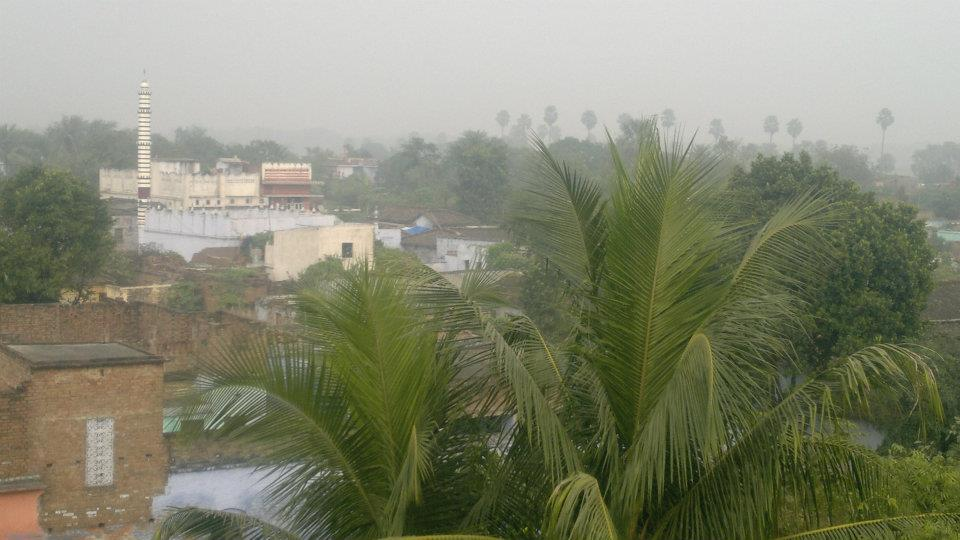
Sonauli Aerial View

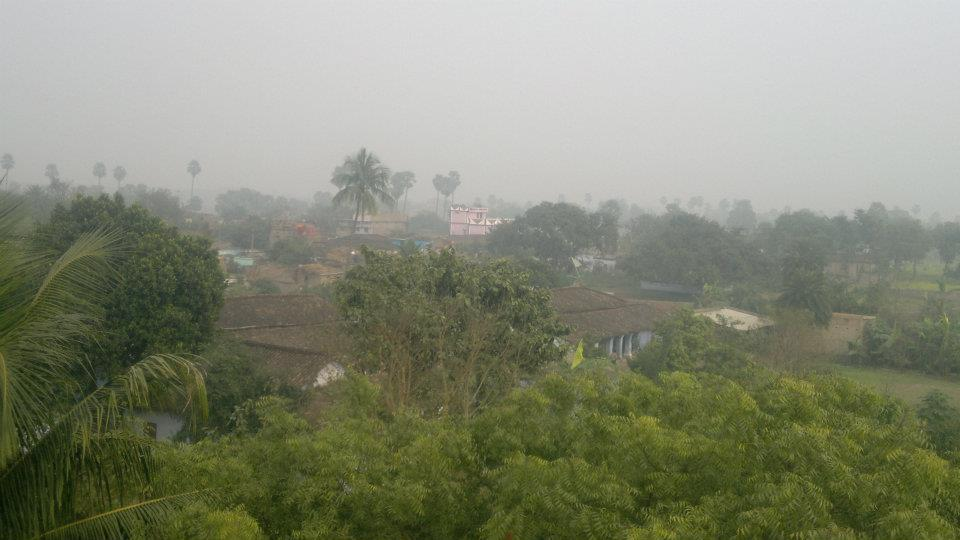
Sonauli Village

== Schools and amenities ==
The following schools are located in Sonauli:

- Green Valley World School
- Ideal Public School
- S S Academy

There is no hospital in the village, but there are three doctors and a polyclinic who work for the welfare of the village. There is a post office in the village. There are also arrangements for football and cricket games in the village.

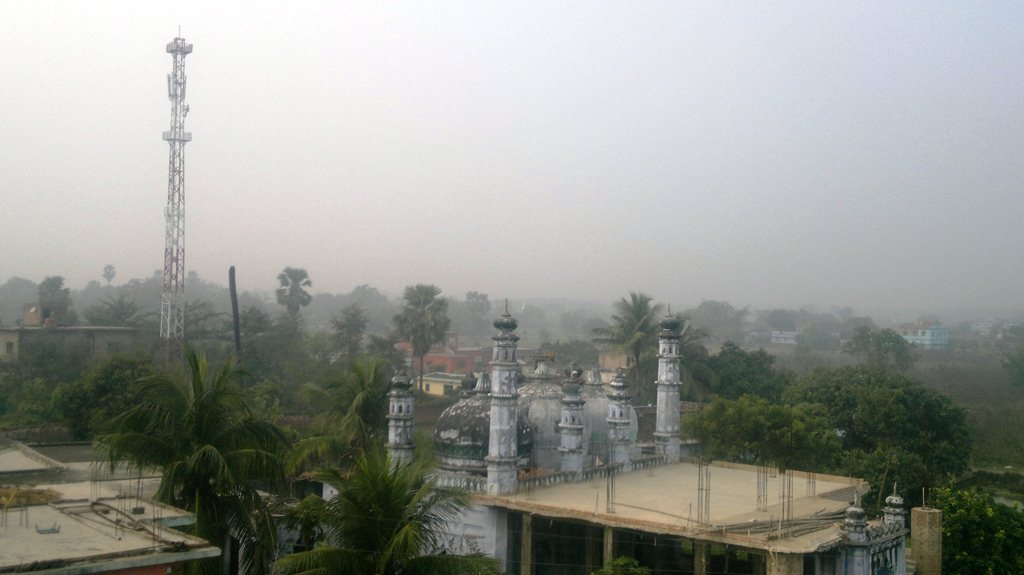
Aerial View of Sonauli Maszid

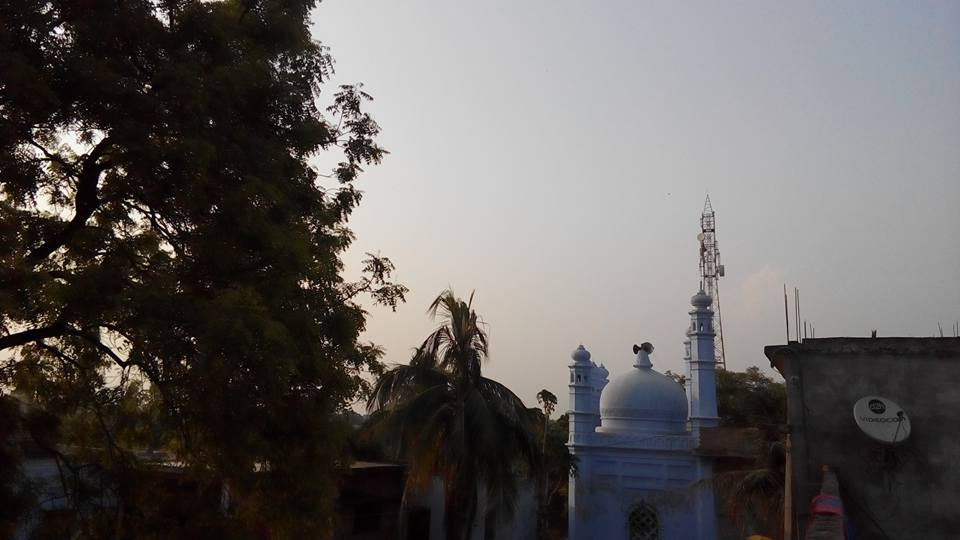
Sonauli Village Maszid
