= Maa Shakumbhari University =

University in India

- Other names: Government Degree College, Punwarka; Saharanpur State University
- Type: State University
- Established: 1999 as Government Degree College, Punwarka; 2022 as Maa Shakumbhari University
- Chancellor: Governor of Uttar Pradesh
- Vice-Chancellor: Vimala Y.
- Location: Saharanpur; 30.0370301°N 77.6262818°E
- Campus: Rural
- Website: http://www.msuniversity.ac.in/

Maa Shakumbhari University is a state university in Saharanpur, Uttar Pradesh.

Construction commenced by 2021 after the university was established under The Uttar Pradesh State Universities (Amendment) Act, 2019. It was originally called Saharanpur State University until it was renamed in August 2021(established by Uttar Pradesh Act no. 6 of 2019 and renamed by Uttar Pradesh Act no. 19 of 2021).

It was established by upgrading Government Degree College, Punwarka (established in 1999) and affiliate all government and private degree colleges in the districts of Muzaffarnagar, Saharanpur, Shamli which were affiliated with Chaudhary Charan Singh University.
