= Pipiganj =

Peppeganj
- Town
- Location in Uttar Pradesh, India Peppeganj (India)
- Coordinates: 26°55′52″N 83°17′56″E
- Country: India
- State: Uttar Pradesh
- District: Gorakhpur

Languages
  - Official: Hindi
  - Local: Bhojpuri
- Time zone: UTC+5:30 (IST)
- PIN: 273165
- Telephone code: 91551
- Vehicle registration: UP- 53
- Sex ratio: 1006/1000 ♂/♀
- Website: up.gov.in

Pipiganj, also spelled as Peppeganj in older documentations, is a town and a nagar panchayat in Gorakhpur district in the Indian state of Uttar Pradesh. It is located on the NH-24 .It is 22 km away from Gorakhpur and 72 km from Sonauli border of Nepal.

The town bears its name after William C. Peppe who was the estate manager, and later on, owner of Birdpore estate (now in Siddharthnagar district).

== Economy ==
The economy of Peppeganj is well developed due to good market and well developed businesses. There are more than 1000 shops having the average of 3 employees each.

Peppeganj railway station is located on the broad gaze to main line between Gorakhpur Junction railway station via Barhni, Gonda.

== Climate ==
Climate data for Peppeganj
Month	Jan	Feb	Mar	Apr	May	Jun	Jul	Aug	Sep	Oct	Nov	Dec	Year
Record high °C (°F)	29 (84)	35 (95)	42 (108)	44 (111)	47 (117)	48 (118)	41 (106)	39 (102)	39 (102)	38 (100)	33 (91)	28 (82)	48 (118)
Mean daily maximum °C (°F)	18 (64)	24 (75)	34 (93)	38 (100)	42 (108)	44 (111)	36 (97)	34 (93)	35 (95)	32 (90)	25 (77)	20 (68)	33 (91)
Mean daily minimum °C (°F)	6 (43)	10 (50)	16 (61)	22 (72)	27 (81)	29 (84)	27 (81)	26 (79)	25 (77)	20 (68)	12 (54)	8 (46)	15 (59)
Record low °C (°F)	−3 (27)	6 (43)	10 (50)	15 (59)	20 (68)	22 (72)	22 (72)	20 (68)	21 (70)	15 (59)	9 (48)	2 (36)	−3 (27)
Average precipitation mm (inches)	23 (0.9)	16 (0.6)	9 (0.4)	5 (0.2)	6 (0.2)	68 (2.7)	208 (8.2)	286 (11.3)	202 (8.0)	43 (1.7)	7 (0.3)	8 (0.3)	881 (34.7)

== Tourism ==
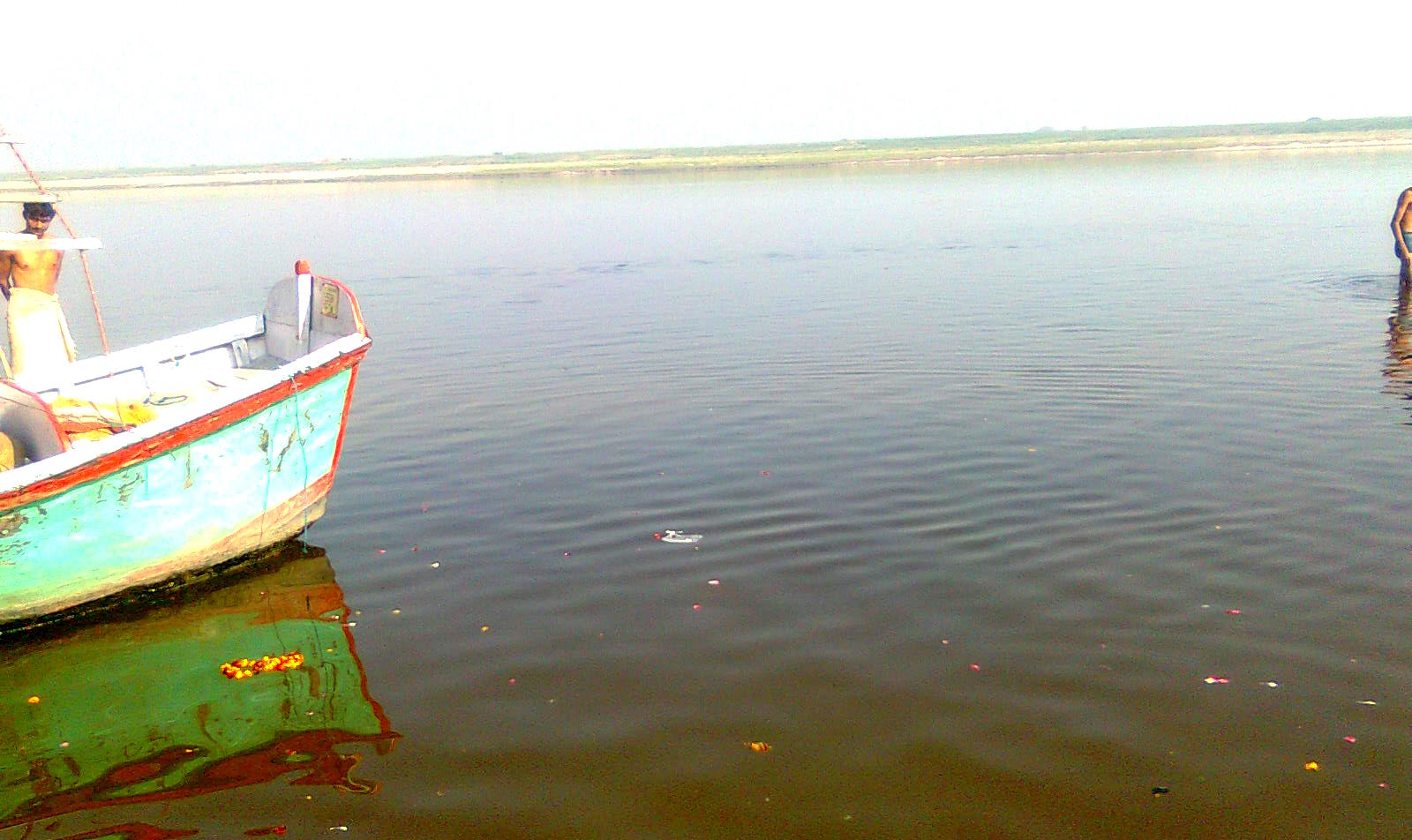
Gooram Pokhra

Gooram Pokhra features a temple between hundreds of bargad tree roots. Many Bhojpuri movies had been shot here. Crowds gather here for worship during Navaratras.

Baisi Mata Ka Mandir is a temple situated near the Ankatahawa bridge and is 200 metres from Rohni River. People gather there for worship during Ram Nawami in April.

Kauriya Mandir of Durga Mata is situated at Jungle Kauriya. It is the temple of Durga Mata. This temple near to Jungle Kauriya Police chauki at NH-29.

Ramleela samiti Rawatganj is one of oldest ramleela samiti situated in Rawatganj.

Old durga temple is situated in main market>
