= Jai Mangal Kanojiya =

Indian politician

MLA in 17th Legislative Assembly of Uttar Pradesh
- Incumbent
- Assumed office March 2017
- Preceded by: Sudama
- Constituency: Maharajganj (Assembly constituency)

Personal details
- Born: 3 February 1976 (age 50) Maharajganj, Uttar Pradesh
- Party: Bharatiya Janata Party
- Occupation: MLA
- Profession: Politician; Agriculture

Jai Mangal Kanojiya is an Indian politician and a member of the 17th Legislative Assembly of Uttar Pradesh of India. He represents Maharajganj and is a member of the Bharatiya Janata Party.

== Early life and education ==
Kanojiya was born 3 February 1976 in Maharajganj District, Uttar Pradesh to Gabbu Prasad Jaimangal Kanojiya. He belongs to the Dhobi scheduled caste and is an agriculturist by profession.

== Political career ==
Kanojiya ran in the 17th Legislative Assembly of Uttar Pradesh (2017) elections as a member of the Bharatiya Janata Party. He was elected to represent Maharajganj, defeating Bahujan Samaj Party candidate Nirmesh Mangal by a margin of 68,361 votes (27.95%).

== Controversy ==
In April 2018, a video of Kanojiya gambling and drinking at Tiger Resort Casino in Rupendahi District, Nepal was made public.

== Posts held ==
#	From	To	Position	Comments
01	March 2017	Incumbent	Member, 17th Legislative Assembly of Uttar Pradesh	
