= Khadda railway station =

Railway station in Uttar Pradesh, India

Khadda

General information
- Location: Khadda, Kushinagar district, Uttar Pradesh; India
- Coordinates: 27°10′59″N 83°52′06″E
- Elevation: 98 m (322 ft)
- System: Passenger train station
- Owner: Indian Railways
- Operator: North Eastern Railway
- Line: Muzaffarpur–Gorakhpur main line
- Platforms: 2
- Tracks: 1

Construction
- Structure type: Standard (on ground station)

Other information
- Status: Active
- Station code: KZA
- Zone(s): North Eastern Railway zone
- Division(s): Varanasi

History
- Opened: 1930s

Services
Preceding station	Indian Railways	Following station
Gurli Ramgarhwa towards ?	North Eastern Railway zone Muzaffarpur–Gorakhpur main line	Paniahwa towards ?
Location

Khadda railway station is a railway station on Muzaffarpur–Gorakhpur main line under the Varanasi railway division of North Eastern Railway zone. This is situated at Khadda in Kushinagar district of the Indian state of Uttar Pradesh.
