= Campierganj =

- Town
- Location in Uttar Pradesh, India
- Coordinates: 27°1′44.32″N 83°16′0.63″E
- Country: India
- State: Uttar Pradesh
- District: Gorakhpur
- Established: 10 November 1877

Government
  - Type: Panchayati government

Population
  - Total: 329,104

Languages
  - Official: Hindi, Bhojpuri
- Time zone: UTC+5:30 (IST)
- PIN: 273158
- Vehicle registration: UP-53
- Nearest city: Gorakhpur
- Sex ratio: 1000/921 ♂/♀
- Lok Sabha constituency: Gorakhpur
- Vidhan Sabha constituency: Campierganj
- Avg. annual temperature: 25 °C (77 °F)
- Avg. summer temperature: 40 °C (104 °F)
- Avg. winter temperature: 15 °C (59 °F)

Campierganj (on the name of British "station master" of this railway station) also called as Chaumukha, is a small Town in the province of Uttar Pradesh in north India, approximately 34 km (21 mi) north of Gorakhpur city near the border with Nepal on National Highway-24 (NH-24) in Gorakhpur District. This is situated on the Buddhist Circuit which is built from Lumbini (Nepal), Kushinagar, Sarnath up to Bodh Gaya. Campierganj is a Tahsil (subdivision) in Gorakhpur district of Uttar Pradesh.

There are two intermediate co-education college, one girls intermediate college and one government degree college in the town. Broad-gauge trains of Indian Railways operating on the Gorakhpur–Nautanwa and Gorakhpur–Gonda routes both pass through Campierganj. Former Chief Minister of Uttar Pradesh and Union Cabinet Minister of Communication of India Sri Vir Bahadur Singh started his political career from Campierganj.

Other nearest towns to Campierganj are Pharenda, Peppeganj, Paniara and Mehdaval bazar in range of 20 km.

An ancient famous temple of god Shiva located at Gaurishankar village is approximately 6 km far from Campierganj towards west.
