= Paniyara Assembly constituency =

Constituency of the Uttar Pradesh legislative assembly in India

Coordinates: 27.00°N 83.46°E

Paniyara
- Constituency No. 319 for the Uttar Pradesh Legislative Assembly

Constituency details
- Country: India
- Region: North India
- State: Uttar Pradesh
- District: Maharajganj
- Total electors: 3,98,745 (2017)
- Reservation: None

Member of Legislative Assembly
- 18th Uttar Pradesh Legislative Assembly
- Incumbent Gyanendra Singh
- Party: Bharatiya Janta Party
- Elected year: 2022

Paniyara is a constituency of the Uttar Pradesh Legislative Assembly covering the city of Paniyara in the Maharajganj district of Uttar Pradesh, India.

Paniyara is one of five assembly constituencies in the Maharajganj Lok Sabha constituency. Since 2008, this assembly constituency is numbered 319 amongst 403 constituencies.

== Members of Legislative Assembly ==
Year	Member	Party
1967	Vir Bahadur Singh	Indian National Congress
1969	Vir Bahadur Singh	Indian National Congress
1974	Vir Bahadur Singh	Indian National Congress
1977	Gunjeshwar Tripathi	Independent
1980	Vir Bahadur Singh	Indian National Congress
1985	Vir Bahadur Singh	Indian National Congress
1989	Ganpat Singh	Independent
1991	Fateh Bahadur Singh	Indian National Congress
1993	Ganpat Singh	Bharatiya Janata Party
1996	Fateh Bahadur Singh	Indian National Congress
2002	Fateh Bahadur Singh	Bharatiya Janata Party
2007	Fateh Bahadur Singh	Bahujan Samaj Party
2012	Deo Narayan Singh	Bahujan Samaj Party
2017	Gyanendra Singh	Bharatiya Janata Party
2022	Gyanendra Singh	Bharatiya Janata Party

== Election results ==
=== 2027 ===
2027 Uttar Pradesh Legislative Assembly election: Paniyara
Party	Candidate	Votes	%	±%
INDIA				
NDA				
BSP				
NOTA	None of the above			
Majority				
Turnout				
gain from		Swing		

=== 2022 ===
2022 Uttar Pradesh Legislative Assembly election: Paniyara
Party	Candidate	Votes	%	±%
BJP	Gyanendra Singh	135,463	52.11	▲3.19
SP	Krishnabhan	74,035	28.48	
BSP	Omprakash Chaurasia	34,829	13.4	▼7.85
AIMIM	Shamshad Aalam	3,457	1.33	
INC	Shardendu Kumar Pandey	2,992	1.15	▼18.53
NOTA	None of the above	1,558	0.6	▼0.28
Majority		61,428	23.63	▼4.04
Turnout		259,931	61.36	▲0.2
BJP hold		Swing		

=== 2017 ===
2017 Assembly Elections: Paniyara
Party	Candidate	Votes	%	±%
BJP	Gyanendra Singh	119,308	48.92	
BSP	Ganesh Shankar Pandey	51,817	21.25	
INC	Talat Aziz	48,004	19.68	
NISHAD	Suman	10,762	4.41	
RLD	Ganpat Singh	3,561	1.46	
NOTA	None of the above	2,124	0.88	
Majority		67,491	27.67	
Turnout		243,886	61.16	
BJP gain from BSP		Swing	▲22.79	

=== 2012 ===
2012 Assembly Elections: Paniyara
Party	Candidate	Votes	%	±%
BSP	Deo Narayan Singh	56,114	26.56	Steady
BJP	Gyanendra Singh	52,031	24.63	Steady
SP	Janardan Prasad Ojha	39,264	18.59	Steady
INC	Talat Aziz	35,451	16.78	Steady
PECP	Diwakar	4,314	2.04	Steady
	Remaining 17 Candidates	24,051	11.40	Steady
Majority		4,083	1.93	Steady
Turnout		2,11,265	58.33	Steady
BSP hold		Swing		
