= Bridgmanganj =

Coordinates: 27°12′N 83°12′E

Brijmanganj is a town in Uttar Pradesh, India, situated at the point of western Maharajganj district and the border of Siddharthnagar district. It is named after a British landlord Johnhall Brijman.During British raj it was well connected grain market.

== History ==
Brijmanganj was founded in the past by British landlord John Hall Brijman, who established the town that became a major grain market. It was known as Sahibganj before becoming Brijmanganj, named after Brijman and his daughter Laira. The town later saw significant historical events, including the rise of freedom fighter Shyam Lal and activities during the Indian independence movement. Foundation and Naming Founding: The town was established by British landlord John Hall Brijman. Original Name: Initially, the town was known as Sahibganj. Name Change: It was later named Brijmanganj, and it's suggested the name comes from John Brijman. Economic History Grain Market: The town developed into a major grain market. Sugar Mill: A sugar mill was started around 1935 but closed in 1995. Independence Movement Shyam Lal's Role: Shyam Lal, a local freedom fighter, played a significant role in the area, with his name striking fear among British soldiers, according to Hindustan. Gandhi-Nehru Sabha: Mahatma Gandhi and Pandit Jawaharlal Nehru intended to hold a public meeting in Brijmanganj in 1932, but the British authorities prevented it, so the meeting was held at Dominagarh. Religious Significance Temple of Goddess (Lehda): Located near Brijmanganj, the Temple of Goddess (Lehda) is a significant pilgrimage site with legends about its divine protection.

Bridgmanganj was accorded the status of Town Area Nagar Panchayat in 2020. A well-known local attraction is the Lehra Devi temple, which is 5 kilometres (3.1 mi) away from the town. Bridgmanganj is connected to the rail link to the Gorakhpur, Gonda, Lucknow, etc. stations. The town has now recognized as Nagar Panchayat by the state government. The order was passed by the CM Yogi Adityanath.
