= Nichlaul =

- Town
- Location in Uttar Pradesh, India
- Coordinates: 27.32°N 83.73°E
- Country: India
- State: Uttar Pradesh
- District: Maharajganj
- Elevation: 91 m (299 ft)

Population (2011)
  - Total: 45,901

Languages
  - Official: Hindi
- Time zone: UTC+5:30 (IST)
- Postal code: 273304

Nichlaul is a town and a nagar panchayat in Maharajganj district in the Indian state of Uttar Pradesh. It is situated 25 km from district headquarter Maharajganj and 80 km from Gorakhpur. It is situated near the Indo-Nepal border.

== Government facilities ==
There is a Sadar Hospital and Animal Hospital facilitated by the government. Block and Tehsil headquarters are there. The Police Station is also in the centre of the town. The state government facilitate Buses for transport to link it with Nepal, Gorakhpur and other neighbourhoods. However Nichloul is not connected by a rail line. The nearest Railway Station is Gurli Ramgadwa, a village 15 km to the southeast.

== Religious and Cultural places ==
Etahia Shiv Mandir is just 8 km from Tikulahiyan Mata mandir, considered as most popular for holy place of Lord Shiva. In the month of Shravan as per Hindu calendar there is a huge arrival of pilgrims at the place. Tikulahia Devi temple is also there within the town. here, the palace of Lord Raja Ratan Sen was situated but it is turned into 'Khandahar' but today a small temple is built on that place. The Darjiniya Tal which has many crocodiles, is located at Nichlaul Range which is also selected in "One District One Tourist Centre" and is being developed by the government.

== Demographics ==
As of 2011 India census, Nichlaul had a population of 45901. Males constitute 53% of the population and females 47%. Nichlaul has an average literacy rate of 65.9%, lower than the national average of 59.5%: male literacy is 67%, and female literacy is 44%. In Nichlaul, 18% of the population is under 6 years of age.

== Languages ==
Bhojpuri was mostly spoken by the people in the past. But now, Hindi is the official language.

== Education ==
There are many College situated.

- Ramharsh Intermediate College Nichlaul
