= Harsh Vardhan (Uttar Pradesh politician) =

Indian politician

- Born: 1 December 1947; Agra, United Provinces, India
- Died: 4 October 2016 (aged 68); New Delhi, India
- Education: B.A.
- Alma mater: Lucknow University.
- Occupations: Agriculturist; Social Worker; Horticulturist; Trade Unionist; Politician
- Years active: 1974–2016
- Political party: Indian National Congress
- Spouse: Vishnu Singh
- Children: 2 (including Supriya Shrinate)

Harsh Vardhan (1 December 1947 – 4 October 2016) was an Indian politician from Uttar Pradesh who entered politics with Socialist Party but later joined Congress. He was elected from Maharajganj constituency of Uttar Pradesh in 1989 and 2009.

== Education and background ==
Harsh Vardhan, was an alumnus of Lucknow Sainik School and held a B.A. degree from Lucknow University, Lucknow, Uttar Pradesh. He died after a short illness on 4 October 2016.

== Family ==
His daughter is Supriya Shrinate, who was executive editor with ET Now, the business channel of Times Television Network, before resigning to contest the 2019 Lok Sabha Elections from Maharajganj unsuccessfully and was later appointed as the INC spokesperson.

== Posts held ==
#	From	To	Position
01	1974	1977	President, Samajwadi Yuvjan Sabha, (Youth Wing of Socialist Party) Uttar Pradesh
02	1985	1989	Member, Uttar Pradesh Legislative Assembly
03	1985	1989	Member, Committee on Questions and References, Uttar Pradesh Legislative Assembly
04	1985	1989	Member, Committee of Privileges, Uttar Pradesh Legislative Assembly
05	1985	1989	Member, Committee of Petitions and Subordinate Legislation, Uttar Pradesh Legislative Assembly
06	1986	1988	General Secretary, Janata Party, Uttar Pradesh
07	1989	-	Elected to 9th Lok Sabha
08	1990	-	Member, Consultative Committee, Ministry of Defence
09	2003	2004	Vice President, Uttar Pradesh Congress Committee
10	2000	Date	Member, AICC
11	2009	Date	Re-elected to 15th Lok Sabha (2nd term)
12	2009	Date	Member, Committee on Home Affairs
13	2009	Date	Member, Consultative Committee, Ministry of Defence

== See also ==
- List of members of the 15th Lok Sabha of India
