= Pankaj Chaudhary =

Indian politician (born 1964)

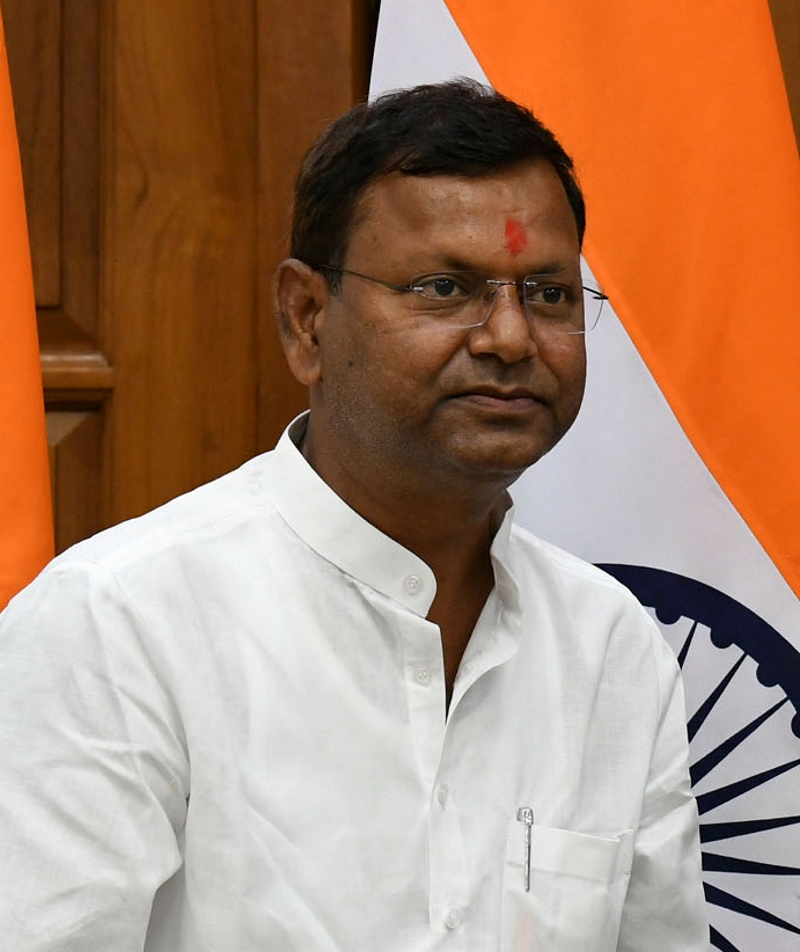
- Official portrait, 2021

President of Bharatiya Janata Party, Uttar Pradesh
- Incumbent
- Assumed office 14 December 2025
- National President: J. P. Nadda; Nitin Nabin
- Preceded by: Bhupendra Chaudhary

Union Minister of State for Finance
- Incumbent
- Assumed office 7 July 2021 Serving with Bhagwat Karad (till 2024)
- Minister: Nirmala Sitaraman
- Preceded by: Anurag Thakur

Member of Parliament, Lok Sabha
- Incumbent
- Assumed office 16 May 2014
- Preceded by: Harsh Vardhan
- Constituency: Maharajganj, Uttar Pradesh
- In office 22 May 2004 – 16 May 2009
- Preceded by: Akhilesh Kumar Singh
- Succeeded by: Harsh Vardhan
- Constituency: Maharajganj, Uttar Pradesh
- In office 19 June 1991 – 26 April 1999
- Preceded by: Bhupendra Chaudhary
- Succeeded by: Akhilesh Kumar Singh
- Constituency: Maharajganj, Uttar Pradesh

Personal details
- Born: 20 November 1964 (age 61) Gorakhpur, Uttar Pradesh, India
- Party: Bharatiya Janata Party
- Spouse: Bhagya Shree Chaudhary (m. 1990)
- Children: 2
- Education: Bachelor of Arts
- Alma mater: Gorakhpur University
- Profession: Industrialist; agriculturist
- As of 9 June, 2020

Pankaj Chaudhary (born 20 November 1964) is an Indian politician who currently serves as the Union Minister of State in the Ministry of Finance, Government of India. He is also the current state president of Bharatiya Janata Party in Uttar Pradesh He is also a Member of Parliament in the Lok Sabha, representing the Maharajganj constituency in Uttar Pradesh for the seventh term. Chaudhary is affiliated with the Bharatiya Janata Party (BJP).

== Early life and family ==
Born in Uttar Pradesh in a Zamindar Kurmi family, Chaudhary graduated from Gorakhpur University. Born to Bhagwati Prasad Chaudhary and Ujjwal Chaudhary, he comes from a political background, with his mother, Ujjwal Chaudhary, having served as the Maharajganj District Panchayat President. Pankaj Chaudhary is married to Bhagya Shree Chaudhary, with whom he has two children.

His political career began at the local level when he served as a Member of the Municipal Corporation in Gorakhpur from 1989 to 1991. During this period, he also held the position of Deputy Mayor of the Municipal Corporation in Gorakhpur from 1990 to 1991. His leadership abilities were quickly recognized, and he was appointed Deputy Mayor of Gorakhpur during the same period. In 1990, Chaudhary became a member of the Bharatiya Janata Party’s (BJP) Working Committee, further solidifying his political affiliation.

== Politics ==
He was first elected to the 10th Lok Sabha in 1991 and then to the 11th Lok Sabha in 1996 and the 12th Lok Sabha in 1998. However, he lost to Akhilesh Singh of the Samajwadi Party in the 1999 General elections. He later won the 2004 Lok Sabha elections.

In 2009, he lost again to the Indian National Congress candidate Harsh Vardhan from Maharajganj. In 2014, he won from the same constituency and is now a member of 16th Lok Sabha.

He became Union Minister of State (Finance) in Second Modi ministry after the Cabinet reshuffle.

Re-elected to 18th Lok Sabha(7th term) June 2024 and Joined 11 June 2024 as Union Minister of State for Finance, Ministry of Finance, Govt of India.

On 14 December 2025, he was appointed as the new president of Bharatiya Janata Party in Uttar Pradesh.

== Positions held ==
- 1989–91: Member, Municipal Corporation, Gorakhpur, Uttar Pradesh
- 1990–91: Deputy Mayor, Municipal Corporation, Gorakhpur, Uttar Pradesh
- 1990 onwards Member, Working Committee, Bharatiya Janata Party (B.J.P.)
- 1991: Elected to 10th Lok Sabha
- 1991–96: Member, Committee on Papers Laid on the Table & Member, Committee on Science and Technology, Environment and Forests
- 1996 : Re-elected to 11th Lok Sabha (2nd term)
- 1996–97: Member, Committee on Communications & Member, Joint Committee on Offices of Profit
- 1998 : Re-elected to 12th Lok Sabha (3rd term)
- 1998–99: Member, Committee on Railways; Member, Committee on Petitions & Member, Consultative Committee, Ministry of Civil Aviation
- 2004 : Re-elected to 14th Lok Sabha (4th term)

Member, Committee on Science and Technology, Environment and Forests Member, Committee on Members of Parliament Local Area Development Scheme Member, Committee on Tourism

- 2007 onwards Member, Committee on MPLADS
- 2014 : Re-elected to 16th Lok Sabha (5th term)
- 2019 : Re-elected to 17th Lok Sabha (6th term)
- 2021 - 9 June 2024: Minister of State, Ministry of Finance.
- 11 June 2024:Union Ministers of State for Ministry of Finance.
- 14 December 2025:15th and current state president of Bharatiya Janata Party in Uttar Pradesh
