= Nautanwa =

- Town
- Location in Uttar Pradesh, India
- Coordinates: 27.43°N 83.42°E
- Country: India
- State: Uttar Pradesh
- District: Maharajganj

Government
  - Type: Nagar Palika Parishad
  - Rank: 1
- Elevation: 89 m (292 ft)

Population (2011)
  - Total: 33,753
  - Density: 10,000/km^{2} (26,000/sq mi)
- Time zone: UTC+5:30 (IST)
- PIN: 273164
- Telephone code: +91-05522
- Vehicle registration: UP 56

Nautanwa is a town and Nagar Palika in Maharajganj district in the state of Uttar Pradesh, India. It is about 87 km from Gorakhpur, NH24 and 68 km NH730 from Maharajganj and 7 km from Sonauli Indo-Nepal Border.

== Geography ==
Nautanwa is located at 27.43°N 83.42°E. It has an average elevation of 89 metres (291 feet). The town is located in the Terai region, in the foothills of the Shiwalik Himalayas.

Nautanwa is a Tehsil/Block in the Mahrajganj District of Uttar Pradesh. According to Census 2011 information, the sub-district code of Nautanwa block is 00944. There are about 259 villages in Nautanwa block.

== Geology ==
Brick clay is abundant everywhere and bricks are made outside the town areas. The soil in the area is light sandy or dense clay of yellowish brown colour. The sand found in the rivers is medium to coarse grained, greyish white to brownish in colour and is suitable for building construction.

== Demographics ==
As of 2001 India census, Nautanwa had a population of 29,259. Males constitute 52% of the population and females 48%.

- Nautanwa has an average literacy rate of 62%, higher than the national average of 59.5%: male literacy is 71%, and female literacy is 52%.
- In Nautanwa, 17% of the population is under 6 years of age.

== Transport ==
Nautanwa is well connected by road and railway. Sonauli at Indo-Nepal border has a Uttar Pradesh State Road Transport Corporation which connects major cities of Uttar Pradesh, Rajasthan and Delhi.

The town has a railway station called Nautanwa railway station, which is the closest to Lumbini in Nepal and it is the last Station from India End. The two countries have an open border without restrictions on the movement of Nepalese and Indian nationals. There is a customs checkpoint for goods and third country nationals.

=== Nearby Airports ===
Code	IATA	Kind	Name	City	Distance	Bearing	Airlines
VNBW	BWA	Medium	Bhairawa Airport	Bhairawa	4 nm N	359	Buddha Air Pvt. Ltd, Saurya Airlines, Simrik Airlines, Yeti Airlines
VEGK	GOP	Medium	Gorakhpur Airport	Gorakhpur	41 nm S	377	Alliance Air, Air India, IndiGo, SpiceJet, Air Vistara, Air Asia
FR47722		Small	Kushinagar Airport	Kushinagar	47 nm S	146	Proposed airports
VNBL	BGL	Small	Baglung Airport	Baglung	48 nm N	15	
VNPK	PKR	Medium	Pokhara Airport	Pokhara	55 nm N	32	Buddha Air Pvt. Ltd, Nepal Airlines, Simrik Airlines, Tara Air, Yeti Airlines
