= Shibban Lal Saxena =

Indian politician

Delhi

Personal details
- Born: 13 July 1906; Agra (Uttar Pradesh)
- Died: August 1984 (78 years); Lucknow
- Political party: Janata Party
- Education: High School

Shibban Lal Saxena (1906-1984) was a former Indian politician and freedom fighter. He was son of late Shri Chhotey Lal Saksena and his uncles were late Shri Shyam Sunder Lal Saksena and late Shri Ram Sunder Lal Saksena. He was born on 13 July 1906 to a wealthy Kayastha Family at Agra.

His maternal grandfather was the first Kayastha ICS of his time. He remained devoted to politics throughout his lifetime and remained unmarried all his life. His only family was that of his younger brother, Dr. Horilal Saxena. He got his formal education at Government High School, Kanpur, Christ Church Inter College, Kanpur, D.A.V. College, Kanpur, University of Allahabad & Agra University.

He was the Professor of Mathematics and Philosophy at St. Andrew's College, Gorakhpur in 1930–31. He was associated with different political parties during his lifetime.

He was associated with Congress from 1919—51 and again from 1954–69, and worked in Kisan Mazdoor Praja Party and Socialist Party from 1954–64, Uttar Pradesh Samajwadi Congress, 1969–77, Congress for Democracy, February 1977 till its merger with the Janata Party; first arrested for organising Hartal in Kanpur to protest against Jallianwala Bagh tragedy in 1919 under the leadership of late Ganesh Shankar Vidyarthi.

During 58 years of political life, he has been arrested 17 times for participating in Gandhiji's Satyagrahas and in Kisan, Mazdoor, Harijan and Students Movements and actually spent a total of 13 years in various jails on different occasions; sentenced to 10 years rigorous imprisonment in Gorakhpur Conspiracy case during "August 1942" Movement, and kept in condemned cell for 26 months, 1942–44; shot at during August rebellion on 6 August 1942; received bullet injury in Nepal Freedom Struggle on 21 December 1950; president, (i) Samajwadi Congress Party, Uttar Pradesh, (ii) "No Tax Satyagraha Campaign Committee", (iii) Kanpur District Congress Committee, 1930–33, (iv) Gorakhpur District Congress Committee, 1937—52 and (v) Kisan Mazdoor Praja Party, 1952— 60; Member, (i) Uttar Pradesh Congress Committee and All India Congress Committee, 1928–51, (ii) Executive of the Uttar Pradesh, Pradesh Congress Committee, 1937–52, (iii) Uttar Pradesh and Bihar Sugar Control Board for many years since 1937 (iv) Sugar Labour Inquiry Committee (Khaitan Committee), 1938–40, (v) Executive Council of the Sanskrit University, Varanasi; president, (i) All-India Sugarcane Growers' Association, and (ii) United Chini Mill Mazdoor Federation; Ex-President, (i) All-India Sugar and Distillery Workers' Federation, (ii) All-India Food, Tobacco and Hotel Workers' Federation, (iii) All-India Transport Workers' Federation, (iv) All-India Dock and Port Workers' Federation, (v) All-India Federation of Government Employees Unions, New Delhi, (vi) North-Eastern Railwaymen's Union, 1937–48, and (vii) Uttar Pradesh Kisan Sabha; elected vice-president, All-India Trade Union Congress in 1947, and Hind Mazdoor Sabha in 1948; Member of Presidium of United Trade Union Congress in 1950; established (i) Ganesh Shankar Vidyarthi Smarak Inter College, Maharajganj in 1940 and (ii) Jawaharlal Nehru Smarak Post Graduate College in 1966 in Maharajganj, (iii) Lal Bahadur Shastri Smarak Degree College, Anand Nagar in 1973, (iv) Choteylal Damodar Prasad Shibbanlal Degree College, Bisokdar, Sirwa Bazar, all in Gorakhpur District, Uttar Pradesh, and acting as president, Managing Committee of all the aforesaid colleges; Member (i) Uttar Pradesh Legislative Assembly, 1937—46 and 1964–67, (ii) Constituent Assembly of India, 1946–50, (iii) Provisional Parliament, 1950–52, (iv) First Lok Sabha, 1954–57, (v) Second Lok Sabha, 1957–62, (vi) Fifth Lok Sabha, 1971–77; several times Member, (i) Estimates Committee, (ii) Public Accounts Committee, (iii) Committee on Public Undertakings; represented Indian Labour at numerous international labour conferences in various foreign countries, and in this connection, and otherwise visited several countries; represented Sugar Workers' Federation in International Conference in Moscow (USSR), 1954, in Sofia (Bulgaria), 1957, in Budapest (Hungary), 1960, and in Prague (Czechoslovakia), 1965; represented Transport Workers in International Conference in Bucharest (Romania), 1956; attended World Peace Council meetings, Berlin, 1954, and Stockholm, 1955. He died in August 1984 in Lucknow possibly due to heart attack.
