= Maharajganj district =

- District of Uttar Pradesh
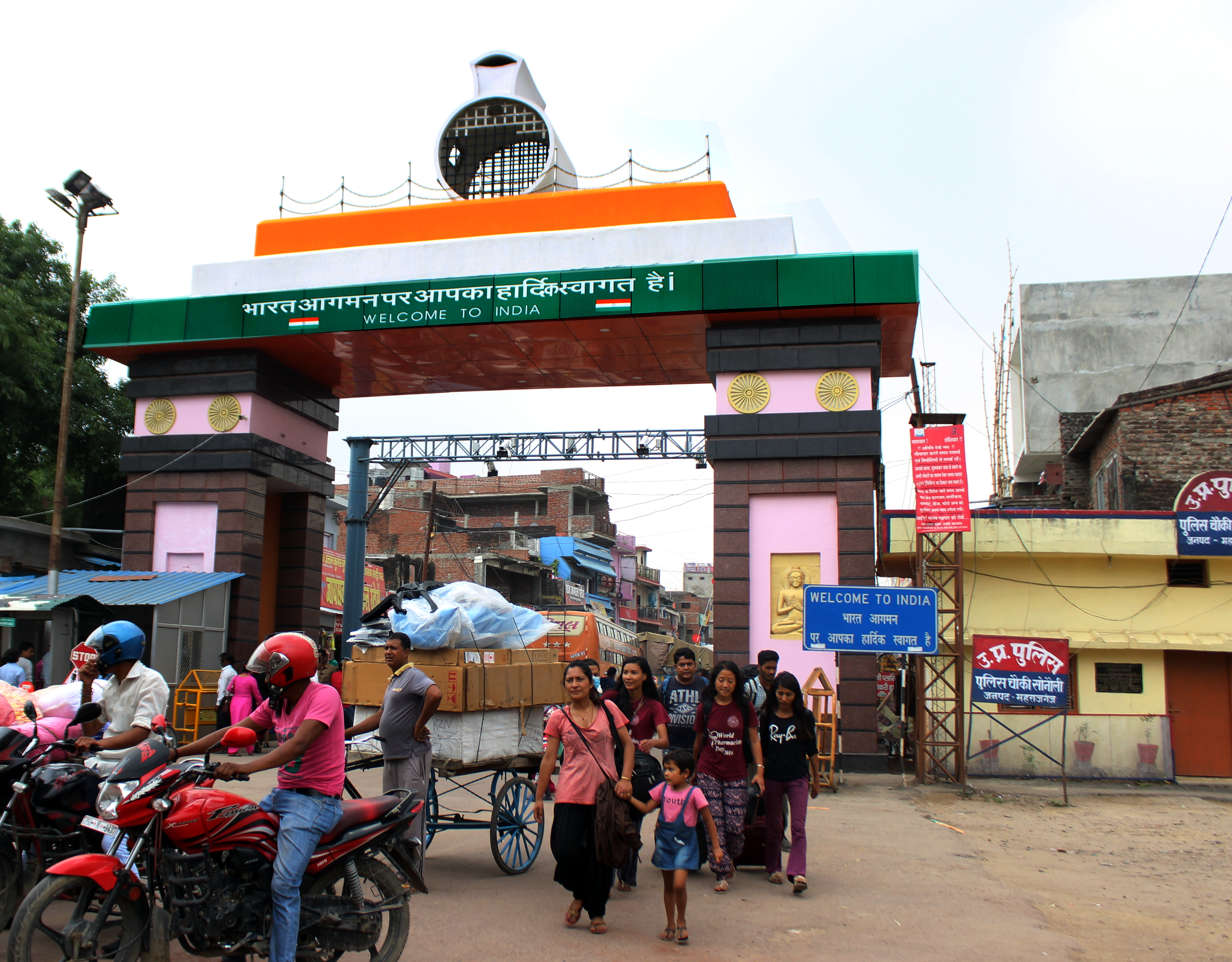
- Nepal-India border checkpoint at Sonauli

- Location of Maharajganj district in Uttar Pradesh
- Country: India
- State: Uttar Pradesh
- Division: Gorakhpur
- Headquarters: Mahrajganj
- Tehsils: Anand Nagar (Pharenda), Nautanwa, Nichlaul, Maharajganj Sadar

Government
  - Lok Sabha constituencies: Maharajganj
  - Vidhan Sabha constituencies: Maharajganj sadar, Siswa Bazar, Anand Nagar (Pharenda), Nautanwa and Paniyara

Area
  - Total: 2,952 km^{2} (1,140 sq mi)

Population (2011)
  - Total: 2,684,703
  - Density: 909.5/km^{2} (2,355/sq mi)
  - Urban: 134,730

Language
  - Official: Hindi
  - Additional official: Urdu
  - Regional: Bhojpuri

Demographics
  - Literacy: 64.3 per cent
  - Sex ratio: 943
- Time zone: UTC+05:30 (IST)
- Major highways: NH730, NH24, NH730S
- Website: maharajganj.nic.in

Maharajganj district is one of the 75 districts of Uttar Pradesh state in northern India, and the town of Maharajganj is the district headquarters. District is a part Gorakhpur division. It is located in Terai region of Himalayas, bordering Nepal in North. Gandak, Rapti and Rohin are the major rivers flowing through the district.

== Geography ==
Maharajganj district is bounded by Nawalparasi and Rupandehi Districts of Lumbini Province of Nepal in the north, the districts of Kushinagar in the east, Maharajganj also shares border with West Champaran district of Bihar in east. It borders Gorakhpur to the south and Siddharthnagar and Sant Kabir Nagar in the west. It is part of Gorakhpur Division. The district covers an area of 2,951 km^{2}. It has a population of 2,684,703 (2011 Census).

== History ==
The district was carved out from the erstwhile Gorakhpur district on 2 October 1989. It is known for the ruins of Buddha which are found here and it is expected that if proper excavation is done then many unknown facts about Buddha will be discovered. Religious temples of Lehra Devi: There is a temple of Lehra Devi (लेहड़ा देवी), also known as Aadravanavaasini (आद्रवनवासिनी), in Lehra forest. People from all over Eastern Uttar Pradesh visit here and worship the goddess Durga. There is special importance to visit here in the period of Navratri in months of March–April and September–October. This temple is about 50 km North-West of Gorakhpur located in Anandnagar. It is believed that while wandering in the forest for 14 years, Pandavas lived a year in disguise. They visited the Lehra Jungle and were offered shelter by Lehra Devi. There is one natural Pindi as in Vaishno Devi. It is also believed that Yudhishthira (युधिष्ठिर) answered the questions of Yaksha (यक्ष) here only in this forest.

The Chinese traveller Hiuen-Tsang also mentions the temple in his book Si-Yu-Ki. During British Raj it was one Military Camp named Lehra. One day a British officer came here and fired a bullet at the Pindi. Suddenly, blood started coming out of the Pindi. Seeing the blood, the British ran away. They all died with their horses. Grave of the British Officer is situated in the West of temple about 1 km of distance. Once Maa came to the town as a beautiful girl and wanted to cross the river. She hired a boat and started the journey but in middle of the river the boatman grew interested in her splendid beauty and went off track. As soon as Devi understood his intention, she disappeared with the boat. In the Kali Yuga she was seen with the boat to her followers who made a temple at the very place. It is believed that if a person visits the temple for regular 5 Tuesdays, his wishes are fulfilled. To reach this temple, buses, autorickshaws and trains are available from Gorakhpur to Anandnagar (Pharenda). It is connected by other mediums to the temple from Anandnagar.

== Politics ==
District has one Lok Sabha constituency named as Maharajganj (Uttar Pradesh Lok Sabha constituency), currently represented by Pankaj Chaudhary of Bhartiya Janta Party.

There are 5 Vidhan Sabha constituencies in the district which are:

- Nautanwa
- Maharajagnj Sadar
- Paniyara
- Siswa Bazar
- Anandnagar (Pharenda)

== Notable people ==
- Shibban Lal Saxena, Former MP of Maharajganj

== Municipal Corporations ==
There are 3 Nagar Palikas in the district:

- Mahrajganj
- Nautanwa
- Siswa Bazar

There are 8 Nagar Panchayat in the district:

- Bridgemanganj
- Pharenda
- Sonauli
- Nichlaul
- Paniyara
- Ghughuli
- Partawal
- Chowk

Bridgemanganj, Partawal, Chowk and Paniyara are newly created.

== Villages ==
Lejar mahdewa (lejruwa) Bajardih Dhusiya Uditpur

== Economy ==
In 2006 the Ministry of Panchayati Raj named Maharajganj one of the country's 250 most backward districts (out of a total of 640). It is one of the 34 districts in Uttar Pradesh currently receiving funds from the Backward Regions Grant Fund Programme (BRGF).

== Divisions ==
Maharajganj district comprises 4 tehsils:

- Maharajganj Sadar; 4 community development blocks: Maharajganj, Ghughali, Paniyara and Partawal.
- Nautanwa; comprising 2 community development blocks: Ratanpur and Laxmipur.
- Nichlaul; 3 community development blocks: Nichlaul, Mithaura and Siswa.
- Pharenda; 3 community development blocks: Bridgmanganj, Dhani and Pheranda.

There are 1048 revenue villages in the district and 20 police stations, Bhitauli being the latest.

Sonauli is the main checkpoint at the Nepal border and is administered directly by home ministry of government of India.

Thuthibari, Bargadwan, Jhulnipur, Bhagwanpur, Kolhui bazar are some other major entry points at Nepal border.

== Demographics ==
Historical population
Year	Pop.	±% p.a.
1901	496,095	—
1911	540,574	+0.86%
1921	551,476	+0.20%
1931	615,937	+1.11%
1941	681,685	+1.02%
1951	765,432	+1.17%
1961	892,048	+1.54%
1971	1,057,848	+1.72%
1981	1,335,090	+2.35%
1991	1,676,378	+2.30%
2001	2,173,878	+2.63%
2011	2,684,703	+2.13%

According to the 2011 census Maharajganj district has a population of 2,684,703, roughly equal to the nation of Kuwait or the US state of Nevada. This gives it a ranking of 148th in India (out of a total of 640 districts). The district has a population density of 909 inhabitants per square kilometre (2,350/sq mi). Its population growth rate over the decade 2001–2011 was 23.50%. Maharajganj has a sex ratio of 943 females for every 1000 males, and a literacy rate of 62.76%. 5.02% of the population lives in urban areas. Scheduled Castes and Scheduled Tribes make up 18.36% and 0.61% of the population respectively.

Religions in Maharajganj district (2011)
Religion	Percent
Hinduism	81.83%
Islam	17.08%
Buddhism	0.60%
Other or not stated	0.49%

Hinduism is practiced by majority of the population, around 82%. Islam is followed by 17% of the population. Maharajganj district has the highest proportion of people following Buddhism in Uttar Pradesh.

Languages in Mahrajganj district (2011)
1. Bhojpuri (59.2%)
2. Hindi (39.6%)
3. Urdu (0.90%)
4. Others (0.22%)

At the time of the 2011 Census of India, 59.23% of the population in the district spoke Bhojpuri, 39.65% Hindi and 0.90% Urdu as their first language.

Bhojpuri is the local language of Maharajganj. The Bhojpuri variant of Kaithi is the indigenous script of Bhojpuri language.
