= Todarpur, Hardoi =

Todarpur Tondarpur
- Populated place
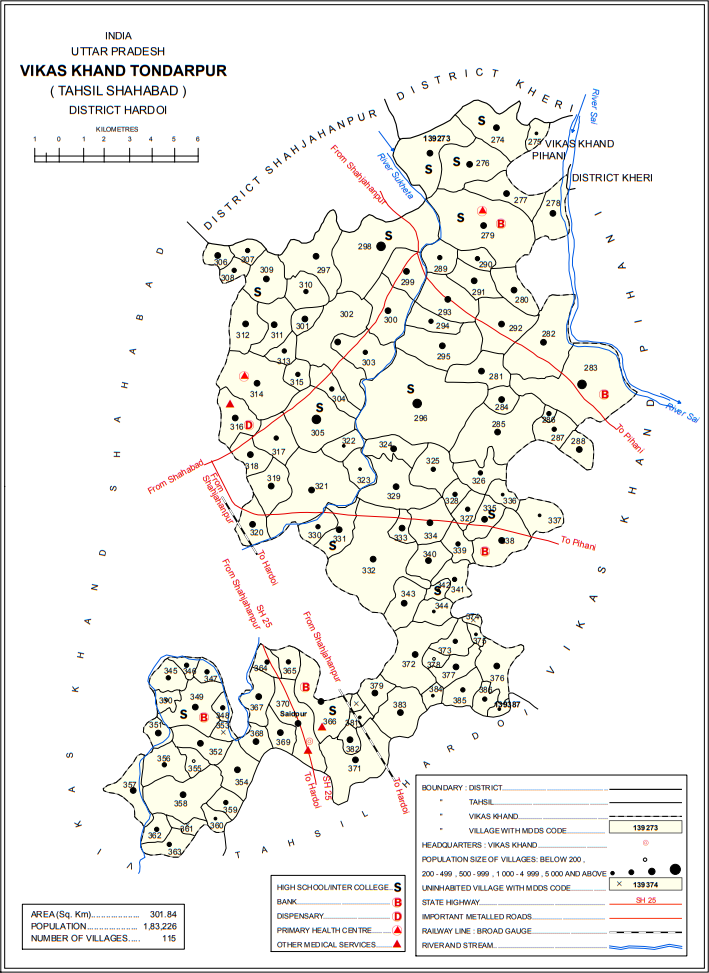
- Map showing Todarpur (#366) in Todarpur CD block

- Location in Uttar Pradesh, India Todarpur (India)
- Coordinates: 27.555476°N 80.025084°E
- Country: India
- State: Uttar Pradesh
- District: Hardoi

Area
  - Total: 4.282 km^{2} (1.653 sq mi)

Population (2011)
  - Total: 3,846
  - Density: 898.2/km^{2} (2,326/sq mi)

Languages
  - Official: Hindi
- Time zone: UTC+5:30 (IST)

Todarpur, also spelled Tondarpur, is a village and corresponding community development block in Shahabad tehsil of Hardoi district, Uttar Pradesh, India. The village has several schools and one clinic. It hosts neither a haat nor a mandi (regular market). The staple crops here are wheat and rice. As of 2011, its population is 3,846, in 603 households.

The village is the site of an old Thathera khera, and was historically the seat of the Onai branch of the Chamar Gaurs.

== Demographic history ==
The 1961 Census recorded Todarpur as comprising 3 hamlets and having a population of 1,532 (853 male and 679 female), in 282 households and 208 physical houses.

The 1981 Census recorded Todarpur as having an area of 433.43 hectares and having a population of 2,088 people, in 449 households.

== Villages ==
Todarpur CD block has the following 115 villages:

Village name	Total land area (hectares)	Population (in 2011)
Karsua Grant	520.5	2,224
Lona	342	1,906
Kanhrapur	66.9	435
Chaina	450	2,186
Nagaria	270.1	2,178
Koochi Khera	303.4	1,639
Alam Nagar	911.7	4,928
Bhogipur Grant	273.5	1,716
Saharua	286.8	1,406
Para	723.1	2,967
Karawan	1,018.9	5,339
Pistia	126	1,188
Parsai	664.7	3,877
Kapoorpur	33.1	936
Gauria	161.5	808
Gaurawa	156.1	1,131
Banjaria	266	764
Basbherwa Rawat	83.8	740
Basbheria	142.1	1,188
Setha	398.1	2,377
Semrawan	335.1	2,141
Kumharua	158.2	793
Kusuma	513.6	2,812
Manjhila	1,435.9	6,866
Sarai Ranak	440.8	1,656
Jamura	945.4	8,948
Palia Kot	235	1,271
Palia Deo Salempur	304	1,635
Jamalpur	117.7	1,004
Fattepur Gazi	745.7	4,049
Ulnapur	275.4	594
Terhwa Caturpur	164.4	694
Tumurki	550.2	8,429
Haidarpur	71.7	1,127
Khumaripur	237.2	897
Haibatpur	107.9	669
Raigavan	264.5	2,157
Barela	194.6	750
Burhanpur	274.2	1,209
Pedhwan	282.5	2,172
Sarai Pengu	110.1	620
Fatehpur Gayand	633	3,635
Hathipur	114.8	942
Kathma	261	2,015
Baharma Hashimpur	242.6	825
Rebha Muradpur	111.1	1,565
Loni	281.7	2,784
Nagla Bhagwan	228.1	1,141
Anjhi	661.8	2,857
Milkia	47.8	359
Ratanpur	158.9	390
Andaua	180.4	1,365
Reori	247.2	944
Dighia	212	899
Jalalpur	135.6	590
Husainapur Diwani	110.4	576
Singoha	467.4	3,682
Dharampur	165.7	987
Chathia	687.1	3,189
Dhanwar	650.6	3,924
Aureri	90	1,258
Antora	277.6	1,196
Newada Chathiya	153.4	1,175
Barkhera	78.8	436
Kuiyan	212.7	456
Ayari	293.1	2,727
Urli	145.9	855
Kaimi	195.7	1,407
Dhakia	192.7	977
Chak Dhakia	59.2	469
Tara Gaon	256	1,331
Karaundi	149.1	341
Teor	168.6	644
Shekhapur	75	621
Pilapur	105.1	527
Nagla Nanhoo	85.4	515
Shiroman Nagar	395.1	3,380
Daud Nagar	80.2	81
Husainpur Karmayan	101.6	2,780
Humaunpur	163.6	1,024
Alavalpur	73.2	0
Surjipur	312	2,989
Bakar Nagar	135.4	172
Rupapur	228	591
Jasrathpur	220.9	1,364
Bhadevna	481	2,590
Bhadevni	118.7	638
Rasoolpur	68.2	363
Dharampur	43.7	0
Amirta	82.1	974
Faizullapur	162.8	707
Baraunia	111.8	578
Kapoorpur Bahoran	127.1	775
Todarpur	428.2	3,846
Kothila Shraiya	251.4	1,774
Bari	139.2	1,186
Bakshipur	155.8	1,086
Saidpur	364.2	2,126
Sikandarpur Bazar	513.1	3,204
Umrauli	493.3	2,761
Pothwa	164.6	585
Kankohri	52.8	0
Lalpur	65.1	377
Peera Mahua	287.9	1,229
Beehat	157.6	1,114
Nevada Satan	68.1	182
Mohauddinpur	186.9	1,300
Madnapur	27.8	0
Raipur	42.4	375
Salempur	75.3	1,163
Kamalpur	329.5	1,635
Deomalpur	66.6	255
Masfana	168.1	948
Binnha	85.9	697
Kapoorpur Shahzade	57	347
