= Vinod Chaturvedi =

Member of the Uttar Pradesh Legislative Assembly

Member of Uttar Pradesh Legislative Assembly
- Incumbent
- Assumed office March 2022
- Preceded by: Narendra Pal Singh
- Constituency: Kalpi

Personal details
- Born: 23 April 1955 (age 71) Jalaun, Uttar Pradesh
- Party: Bharatiya Janata Party (2026-present)
- Other political affiliations: Samajwadi Party (till 2026)
- Children: 4
- Education: Master of Arts
- Alma mater: Dayanand Vedic College
- Profession: Politician

Vinod Chaturvedi is an Indian politician and a member of the 18th Uttar Pradesh Assembly from the Kalpi Assembly constituency of Jalaun district. He was a member of the Samajwadi Party. On 14 October 2026 he have joined Bhartiya Janta Party.

== Early life ==
Vinod Chaturvedi was born on 23 April 1955 in Jalaun, Uttar Pradesh, to a Hindu family of Gajadhar Prasad Chaturvedi. He married Kamla Chaturvedi on 5 January 1956, and they had four children.

== Education ==
Vinod Chaturvedi completed his post-graduation with a Master of Arts at Dayanand Vedic College in Orai, Jalaun, in 1984.

== Posts held ==
#	From	To	Position	Ref
01	2007	2012	Member, 15th Uttar Pradesh Assembly	
02	2022	Incumbent	Member, 18th Uttar Pradesh Assembly	

== See also ==
- 18th Uttar Pradesh Assembly
- Kalpi Assembly constituency
- Uttar Pradesh Legislative Assembly
