= Konch =

City and municipal board in India

- konch
- Location in Uttar Pradesh, India Konch (India)
- Coordinates: 25.98°N 79.15°E
- Country: India
- State: Uttar Pradesh
- District: Jalaun
- Elevation: 141 m (463 ft)

Population (2011)
  - Total: 78,587
  - Rank: 2nd in the district

Languages
  - Official: Hindi, Bundeli
- Time zone: UTC+5:30 (IST)
- PIN: 285205
- Telephone code: 05165
- Vehicle registration: UP 92
- Sex ratio: 1000:976 unlocode = ♂/♀
- Website: jalaun.nic.in

Konch is a city and a municipal board in Jalaun district in the Indian state of Uttar Pradesh.

== Demographics ==
As of 2011 India census, Konch had a total population of 3,01,225 across 121 villages, of which 115 were inhabited. Males constituted 53.4% of the population and females 46.6%. The overall literacy rate of Konch was 73.8%: male literacy was 84.2% and female literacy was 61.95%. Approximately 13.8% of the population was under 6 years of age.

== Location ==
Konch town Is located near Madhya Pradesh border approx distance from Nadigaon town an Madhya Pradesh Border is 20 and 23 km approx. respectively. Ravatpura temple is one of the attractions near Konch town and is nearly 25 km from Konch town. The Konch city is divided into 25 wards.

== Villages ==
Konch tehsil/block has 121 villages:

Villages names	Area in hectares	Population 2011
Babupura State	112	441
Gaindoli	301.4	1732
Bharari	161.2	1204
Bamra	97.2	0
Kudari Konch	245.2	1379
Duhkai	120.7	460
Bhedpura Konch	41.8	0
Jteura Konch	128.1	455
Khabri	108.1	341
Kudra Khurd	165	348
Kudra Buzurg	642.4	792
Pachipuri	259.2	1030
Chamrauwa Buz	202.9	266
Asapura	139.8	568
Ratanpura Lahar	128.4	356
Sami	702.4	3032
Hinguta	284.9	1057
Karyali	160.4	461
Gobardhanpura	151.9	0
Rampursaneta	267.8	727
Ata	390.4	1554
Topor	159.4	612
Basti	446.1	792
Gorakaranpur	382.8	1543
Mohamnda	188.1	0
Bhadeora	399	2249
Nagepura	246.9	197
Chachenda	82	208
Lona	578	1884
Kunwarpura Kor	226	1383
Alawalpura	171	0
Pachipura Kalan	572.4	1377
Chhuni	871.6	1250
Gurati	256.1	522
Sikri	205	804
Chamarsena	627.4	1647
Konch Badpura	2280	4725
Padri	594.4	2078
Bhadari	530.9	1183
Panyara	406.9	1133
Taharpura	195.8	839
Chak Dirauti	15.9	0
Barsesi	319.9	758
Diravati	899.2	2826
Manori	254.9	292
Kaithi	365.4	922
Simiriya	644.4	1949
Barauada Khurd	306.2	485
Ghusia	627.9	1341
Anda	1330.1	4147
Birgawan Buzurg	686.8	2156
Jujharpura	200.4	801
Chamend	409.4	1045
Tursampura	191.2	0
Braoda Kalan	455.4	2080
Kunda	284.8	1615
Chamrathakarpur	254.6	549
Mohunapura	117	0
Arazliane	180.9	1323
Jhala	156	10
Dhohar	84.3	172
Patha	112.7	0
Darhi	372.7	844
Ghamuri	258.5	712
Bohara	281	756
Seta	208.9	366
Inlori	288	634
Umri Konch	79.2	446
Khera Darhi	112.3	4
Paretha	258.4	792
Kheri	467.2	1133
Magra	261.4	620
Kaushalpur	354.4	744
Sunaya	805.8	1907
Kishunpura	422.3	1146
Phulella	295.9	1415
Kamtari	303	838
Bhepta	236	991
Nari	752.8	2359
Pahargaon	1215.9	3901
Kuiyan	60.2	0
Chandni	878.8	2032
Mudia	227.1	0
Chandurra	705.1	2159
Pindari	1363	4103
Basob	1353	3809
Singar	95.4	0
Birgawan Khurd	320	2033
Chamari	182.8	888
Chautarhai	92.2	148
Humauna	171.5	400
Jamrohikalan	344	1670
Barbata	91.9	0
Inguikalan	226.8	1561
Mahatwani Konc	79.2	0
Ingui Khurd	244.8	749
Pirona	1324.7	7156
Parebha	192.2	600
Chachaudi	129.4	0
Chansuwa	143.4	0
Pali	231.4	0
Hajipur	317.2	0
Bhua	210.6	0
Shahpura	337.3	149
Amita	745.2	2936
Satoh	1302.7	2929
Mudri	176.8	0
Bilayan	724.3	2027
Birani	482.8	1610
Dhamensi	247.7	1014
Jakhalai	375.3	1456
Hardua	136.2	329
Kalra	226.9	478
Mansui Ait	419.6	528
Gamoai	229.1	667
Chhitraudi	734	1294
Jamrohi Khurd	327	929
Sala	423.3	212
Thora Sojira	459.9	621
Bhuranda	467	2086
Rukhana	875.9	544

== How to reach ==
- Via rail – You can book tickets to Orai or Ait.
- Via air – Lucknow airport or Kanpur airport or Gwalior Airport are some airports near Konch.
- Via road – Buses from all over the country are available to Orai then you may have to change bus to Konch or private taxis are also available.

== Notable people ==
- Bhanu Pratap Singh Verma
