= Narayan Das Ahirwar =

Indian politician

Member of Parliament, Lok Sabha
- Incumbent
- Assumed office 4 June 2024
- Preceded by: Bhanu Pratap Singh Verma
- Constituency: Jalaun

Nominated Minister: Government of Uttar Pradesh
- In office 2007–2011

Personal details
- Party: Samajwadi Party
- Occupation: Politician

Narayan Das Ahirwar is an Indian politician from the Samajwadi Party (SP) and the Lok Sabha Member of Parliament representing Jalaun. He also served as minister in the Uttar Pradesh Government from 2007 to 2011. Ahirwar had started politics in 1982 inspired by Kanshi Ram and joined DSSSS. He was a founding member of the Bahujan Samaj Party and served in many organisational roles of the party. He became dissatisfied with the party policy after 2014, stopped taking major responsibilities and later started aligning with SP, helped strengthen it and officially joined the party in 2022. He contested as the SP and INDIA alliance candidate from Jalaun (SC) in the 2024 general election and was elected.

== Political life ==
Narayan Das Ahirwar joined politics in 1982 inspired by Kanshi Ram and became a member of the Dalit Shoshit Samaj Sangharsh Samiti (DS4). He became one of the founding members of the Bahujan Samaj Party in 1984.

From 1992 and 2000, he was chairperson of the BSP unit in Orai constituency. He became the district president of the party in Jalaun in 2002 and had a good performance in the state election of that year. In 2005, he was moved out of the post of district president and made the party in-charge of Konch constituency.

He was the nominated minister of the Jal Nigam Board under the Government of Uttar Pradesh from 2007 to 2011, after the BSP formed a simple majority government in 2007. He was also made the zonal coordinator of the Bundelkhand division during this time. He has also been the zonal coordinator of Kanpur, Varanasi, Devipatan, Azamgarh Gorakhpur, Basti and Faizabad in the years since.

In 2013, he was given the responsibility of the BSP state unit of Uttarakhand and made the in-charge of Almora Assembly constituency. Between 2014 and 2022, he became distant from the BSP and stopped taking any major roles, coming into disagreement with the party's policy adopted after Modi came into power at the center. He also began aligning with the Samajwadi Party and helping strengthen it during this time.

He formally left BSP and became a member of SP before the 2022 Uttar Pradesh election and was made the SP-INDIA alliance candidate for the Jalaun-Garautha-Bhognipur in the 2024 general election.

== Personal life ==
Narayan Das Ahirwar is from Saidnagar village in Dakor block, in the Jalaun district of Uttar Pradesh. He is also a resident of Hal Niwas Rajendra Nagar.
