= Pachokhara =

Village in Uttar Pradesh, India

- Village
- Interactive map of Pachokhara
- Country: India
- State: Uttar Pradesh
- District: Jalaun
- Taluka: Madhogarh

Population (2011)
  - Total: 1,377

Languages
  - Official: Hindi
- Time zone: UTC+5:30 (IST)

Pachokhara is a village in the Madhogarh taluka of Jalaun district in Uttar Pradesh, India. As of the 2011 Indian census, it had a population of 1,377.
