= Madhogarh Assembly constituency =

Constituency of the Uttar Pradesh legislative assembly in India

Coordinates: 26.27°N 79.19°E

Madhogarh
- Constituency No. 219 for the Uttar Pradesh Legislative Assembly

Constituency details
- Country: India
- Region: North India
- State: Uttar Pradesh
- District: Jalaun
- Total electors: 4,29,791 (2014)
- Reservation: None

Member of Legislative Assembly
- 18th Uttar Pradesh Legislative Assembly
- Incumbent Moolchandra Singh
- Party: Bharatiya Janta Party
- Elected year: 2017

Madhogarh is a constituency of the Uttar Pradesh Legislative Assembly covering the city of Madhogarh in the Jalaun district of Uttar Pradesh, India.

Madhogarh is one of five assembly constituencies in the Jalaun Lok Sabha constituency. Since 2008, this assembly constituency is numbered 219 amongst 403 constituencies.

मूलचंद निरंजन पूर्व जिला अध्यक्ष ओर पूर्व जिला पंचायत सदस्य भी रह चुके हैं नदीगांव ब्लॉक के महात्वानी गांव के मूल निवासी हैं 2022 के चुनाव में मूलचंद निरंजन 105755 मत पाकर दूसरी बार विजय हुए।।

Currently this seat belongs to Bharatiya Janta Party candidate Moolchandra Niranjan who won in last Assembly election of 2017 Uttar Pradesh Legislative Elections defeating Bahujan Samaj Party candidate Girish Kumar by a margin of 45,985 votes.

सपा कांग्रेस गठबंधन के उम्मीद वार विनोद चतुर्वेदी थे जोकि तीसरे स्थान पर रहे थे विनोद चतुर्वेदी 2007 से 2012 उरई सदर विधान सभा से विधायक रह चुके थे वर्तमान में कालपी 220 से विनोद चतुर्वेदी समाजवादी पार्टी से विधायक है

2022 के विधानसभा चुनाव में समाजवादी पार्टी के उम्मीदवार राघवेंद्र प्रताप सिंह थे जोकि 60662 मत पाकर तीसरे स्थान पर रहे,

बही दूसरे स्थान पर bsp की उम्मीदवार शीतल कुशवाहा थी जो 70569 मत पाकर हार का सामना करना पड़ा, लोकसभा चुनाव 2024 में शीतल कुशवाहा बीजेपी में शामिल हो गई ।।

== Members of Legislative Assembly ==
Year	Member	Party
1967	Govind Narayan Tiwari	Indian National Congress
1969	Chittar Singh	Independent
1974	Rajendra Shah	Indian National Congress
1977	Krishna Kumar	Janata Party
1980	Dalganjan Singh	Janata Party (Secular)
1985	Ram Prakash Singh	Indian National Congress
1989	Shivram Kushwaha	Bahujan Samaj Party
1991	Keshav Singh	Bharatiya Janata Party
1993	Shivram Kushwaha	Bahujan Samaj Party
1996	Santram Singh	Bharatiya Janata Party
2002	Brijendra Pratap Singh	Bahujan Samaj Party
2007	Hariom Upadhyay	Bahujan Samaj Party
2012	Santram Kushwaha	Bahujan Samaj Party
2017	Moolchandra Singh	Bharatiya Janata Party
2022	Moolchandra Singh	Bharatiya Janata Party

== Results ==
=== 2027 ===
2027 Uttar Pradesh Legislative Assembly election: Mandhogarh
Party	Candidate	Votes	%	±%
INDIA				
NDA				
BSP	Ashish Pandey			
NOTA	None of the above			
Majority				
Turnout				
gain from		Swing		

=== 2022 ===
2022 Uttar Pradesh Legislative Assembly election: Madhogarh
Party	Candidate	Votes	%	±%
BJP	Mool Chandra Singh	105,231	41.29	−1.75
BSP	Sheetal Kushwaha	70,257	27.57	2.73
SP	Raghvendra Pratap Singh	63,035	24.74	
INC	Siddarth Devolia	3,141	1.23	−17.34
NOTA	None of the Above	2,852	1.12	0.09
Majority		34,974	13.72	−4.48
Turnout		254828	57.21	−1.36

=== 2017 ===
2017 Uttar Pradesh Legislative Assembly Election: Madhogarh
Party	Candidate	Votes	%	±%
BJP	Moolchandra Singh	108,737	43.04	
BSP	Girish Kumar	62,752	24.84	
INC	Vinod Chaturvedi	46,915	18.57	
MD	Ravindra Singh	22,022	8.72	
RLD	Prahalad Singh	1,466	0.58	
Independent	Rekha Jatav	1,357	0.54	
Unknown	Gopal Swaroop	1138	0.45	
Sarv Sambhaav Party	Shakuntla Devi	1,116	0.44	
Independent	Shivendra Singh	1,092	0.43	
Swatantra Jantaraj Party	Ramkumar Shakyawar	1,057	0.42	
Jan Adhikar Party	Ramjee	901	0.36	
Independent	Parashuram	785	0.31	
Unknown	Vishnu Kumar Chaturvedi	701	0.28	
NOTA	None of the Above	2582	1.03	
Majority		45985	18.2	
Turnout		252621	58.57	
