= Gaya Prasad Kori =

Indian politician

- गया प्रसाद कोरी
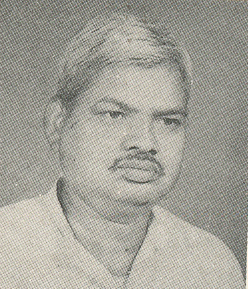
- Gaya Prasad Kori

10th Lok Sabha
- President: Ramaswamy Venkataraman
- Prime Minister: Chandra Shekhar
- Vice President: Shankar Dayal Sharma
- Vice PM: Morarji Desai
- Constituency: Jalaun

Personal details
- Born: Gaya Prasad Kori; 15 June 1950 Konch, Jalaun district, Uttar Pradesh
- Died: 1996 (aged 45–46)
- Spouse: Divorced
- Children: 1 son
- Parent: Ramcharan Dohre
- Occupation: Business person

Gaya Prasad Kori (1950 - 1996) was an Indian politician and former Member of Parliament of 10th Lok Sabha from Jalaun constituency, Uttar Pradesh.

== Other posts held ==
- 1965, Chief instructor of Rashtriya Swayamsevak Sangh, Lalitpur
- 1985, Member of legislative assembly, Uttar Pradesh
- 1988 - 1990, Organising secretary of Vishwa Hindu Parishad
- 1990 onwards, Propagandist of Rashtriya Swayamsevak Sangh, Jalaun district
