= Barguwan =

Village in Uttar Pradesh, India

Barguwan or Bargaon is a village in the Nadigaon block of the Jalaun district, Uttar Pradesh, India.

The village has a population of 1579, with a literacy rate of about 80%.

The village has branches of two banks: State Bank of India and the Punjab National Bank (PNB). It has a PNB ATM. It has five schools: two primary, and three private schools.

The village is connected to the Jalaun town by bus, and falls under the Pradhan Mantri Gram Sadak Yojana. It has a famous temple called "NAwali Ki Mata".
