= Gopalpura, Uttar Pradesh =

Gopalpura Jagir Gopalpura
- Village
- Interactive map of Gopalpura Jagir
- Coordinates: 26.242308°N 79.0796541°E
- Country: India
- State: Uttar Pradesh
- District: Jalaun
- Tehsil: Madhogarh

Government
  - Body: Local Governance

Population (2011)
  - Total: 1,150

Languages
  - Official: Hindi
- Time zone: UTC+5:30 (IST)
- PIN: 285121
- Vehicle registration: UP-92
- Website: jalaun.nic.in

Gopalpura (officially named Gopalpura Jagir) is a village in the Jalaun District in the Indian state of Uttar Pradesh.
