= Jalaun Lok Sabha constituency =

Constituency of the Indian parliament in Uttar Pradesh

Coordinates: 26.06°N 79.42°E

Jalaun UP-45
- Lok Sabha constituency
- Interactive Map Outlining Jalaun Lok Sabha constituency

Constituency details
- Country: India
- Region: North India
- State: Uttar Pradesh
- Assembly constituencies: Bhognipur; Madhogarh; Kalpi; Orai; Garautha
- Established: 1977
- Reservation: SC

Member of Parliament
- 18th Lok Sabha
- Incumbent Narayan Das Ahirwar
- Party: Samajwadi Party
- Elected year: 2024

Jalaun is a Lok Sabha parliamentary constituency in Jalaun district, South-Western Uttar Pradesh, India.

The serial number of this constituency in Uttar Pradesh, is 58. This constituency is reserved for Scheduled caste candidates.

In the 2004 Lok Sabha Elections, 44.25% of eligible voters exercised their franchise.

== Assembly segments ==
No	Name	District	Member	Party	2024 Lead
208	Bhognipur	Kanpur Dehat	Rakesh Sachan	BJP	SP
219	Madhogarh	Jalaun	Moolchandra Singh	BJP	SP
220	Kalpi	Jalaun	Vinod Chaturvedi	SP	SP
221	Orai (SC)	Jalaun	Gauri Shankar	BJP	SP
225	Garautha	Jhansi	Jawahar Singh Rajput	BJP	BJP

== Members of Parliament ==
Year	Member	Party
1962	Ram Sewak Chowdhary	Indian National Congress
1967	Ram Sewak Chowdhary	Indian National Congress
1971	Ram Sewak Chowdhary	Indian National Congress
1977	Ramcharan Dohre	Janata Party
1980	Nathuram Shakyawar	Indian National Congress
1984	Lachhi Ram	Indian National Congress
1989	Ram Sevak Bhatia	Janata Dal
1991	Gaya Prasad Kori	Bharatiya Janata Party
1996	Bhanu Pratap Singh Verma	Bharatiya Janata Party
1998	Bhanu Pratap Singh Verma	Bharatiya Janata Party
1999	Brijlal Khabri	Bahujan Samaj Party
2004	Bhanu Pratap Singh Verma	Bharatiya Janata Party
2009	Ghanshyam Anuragi	Samajwadi Party
2014	Bhanu Pratap Singh Verma	Bharatiya Janata Party
2019	Bhanu Pratap Singh Verma	Bharatiya Janata Party
2024	Narayan Das Ahirwar	Samajwadi Party

== Election results ==
=== 2024 ===
2024 Indian general elections: Jalaun
Party	Candidate	Votes	%	±%
SP	Narayan Das Ahirwar	530,180	46.96	▲46.96
BJP	Bhanu Pratap Singh Verma	4,76,282	42.19	▼9.30
BSP	Suresh Chandra Gautam	1,00,248	8.88	▼28.59
NOTA	None of the Above	11,154	0.99	▼0.12
Majority		53,898	4.77	▼9.25
Turnout		11,28,949	56.27	▼2.22
SP gain from BJP		Swing		

=== 2019 ===
2019 Indian general elections: Jalaun
Party	Candidate	Votes	%	±%
BJP	Bhanu Pratap Singh Verma	581,763	51.49	+2.03
BSP	Ajay Singh (Pankaj)	4,23,386	37.47	+13.9
INC	Brijlal Khabri	89,606	7.93	+0.46
NOTA	None of the Above	12,514	1.11	+0.18
Majority		1,58,377	14.02	−11.87
Turnout		11,30,746	58.49	−0.29
BJP hold		Swing		

=== Election results 2014 ===
2014 Indian general elections: Jalaun
Party	Candidate	Votes	%	±%
BJP	Bhanu Pratap Singh Verma	548,631	49.46	
BSP	Brijlal Khabri	2,61,429	23.57	
SP	Ghanshyam Anuragi	1,80,921	16.31	
INC	Vijay Chaudhary	82,903	7.47	
BMP	Ram Narayan	4,944	0.45	
NOTA	None of the Above	10,291	0.93	
Majority		2,87,202	25.89	
Turnout		11,09,197	58.78	
BJP gain from SP		Swing		

== See also ==
- Jalaun
- List of constituencies of the Lok Sabha
