= Itaura =

Village in Uttar Pradesh, India

Itaura akbarpur itaura guru ka itaura
- village
- Location in Uttar Pradesh, India
- Coordinates: 25.98°N 79.47°E
- Country: India
- State: Uttar Pradesh
- District: Jalaun
- Elevation: 131 m (430 ft)

Population (2001)
  - Total: 20,000

Languages
  - Official: Hindi
- Time zone: UTC+5:30 (IST)
- PIN: 285202

Itaura is a village in Jalaun district in the Indian state of Uttar Pradesh. This is a twin village and it includes Akbarpur (Guru ka itora) and Itora (Purana Itora).

== Demographics ==
As of 2014 India census, Itaura had a population of 19,455. Males constitute 54% of the population and females 46%. Etaura has an average literacy rate of 70%, higher than the national average of 65.38%. Male literacy is 76%, and female literacy is 62%. In Itaura, 12% of the population is under 6 years of age.

== Location ==
Itaura is located midway between the cities of Kanpur and Jhansi and lies on National Highway (NH-25) which is soon going to be a part of East-West corridor of the NHAI Project. It is approximate 25 km from Orai.
