= Kathpurva =

Village located in Kalpi Tehsil of Jalaun district

Kathpurva is a village located in the Kalpi tehsil of Jalaun district in the Indian state of Uttar Pradesh. There are two villages under the jurisdiction of Kathpurva Gram Panchayat. Gram Panchayat Kathpurva is further divided into 11 wards. Gram Panchayat Kathpurva has total 11 elected members by people.

== Geography ==
Kathpurva covers an area of approximately 356.84 hectares. It is situated about 25 kilometers from the sub-district headquarters at Kalpi and roughly 40 kilometers from the district headquarters of Jalaun. The pincode of Kathpurva is 285203.

== Demographics ==
As per the 2011 Census of India, Kathpurva has a total population of 1,285 individuals residing in around 220 households. The gender distribution is 690 males to 595 females.

Kathpurva's literacy rate is approximately 74.11% overall, with male literacy at 78.90% and female literacy at 68.63%. There are about 862 females per 1,000 males, with a slightly lower child sex ratio for those aged 0–6 years. A sizable portion of the population - around 53.54% - belong to the Scheduled Castes.

== Infrastructure ==
The village has road connectivity that links it to nearby towns, with Kalpi—the nearest urban center—located approximately 25 kilometers away.
