= Kuiyan =

- Village
- Location within Uttar Pradesh Location within India
- Coordinates: 25.9719°N 79.4727°E
- Country: India
- State: Uttar Pradesh
- Division: Jhansi
- District: Jalaun
- Tehsil: Orai

Population (2011)
  - Total: 1,053
- Time zone: UTC+5:30 (IST)
- PIN: 285001

Kuiyan is a village near Orai station in Uttar Pradesh State in India. National Highway 27 passes through it.

== Politics ==
Kishorilalji bjp district Maha Sachiv belongs to the village.
