= Kyamdi =

Kyamdi is a village located near Jalaun in the State of Uttar Pradesh in India.
