= Kuthond, Uttar Pradesh =

Kuthond Kuthaund
- town
- Location in Uttar Pradesh, India Kuthond (India)
- Coordinates: 26°22′N 79°25′E
- Country: India
- State: Uttar Pradesh
- District: jalaun

Government
  - Type: Municipal corporation
  - Body: Nagar Palika

Population
  - Total: 17,000

Languages
  - Official: Hindi
- Time zone: UTC+5:30 (IST)
- PIN: 285125
- Telephone code: 05168
- Vehicle registration: UP-92
- Nearest city: auraiya
- Sex ratio: 886/1000 ♂/♀
- Climate: average (Köppen)
- Website: jalaun.nic.in

Kuthond or Kuthaund is a small town and panchayat of Jalaun in Uttar Pradesh, India. This town is 16 km from Auraiya and 26 km from Jalaun.

== Education ==
The town has several schools and colleges, including the Janta Sanatan Dharm Inter College.

== Culture ==
In Noorani Jama Masjid. The main Hindu temples in Kuthaund include Ram Janki Temple, Panchsheel Buddh Vihar, Hanuman Temple, Badi Mata temple and Maha Kaleshwar Temple, Narmdeshwar Maharaj Temple, Gadhi Wale Baba.

== daulatpur ==
- Naurejpur
