= Dohre =

Dohre is a surname. Notable people with the surname include:

- Ramcharan Dohre, Indian politician
- Ashok Kumar Doharey, Indian politician
