= Jugiyapur =

Village in Uttar Pradesh, India

Jugiyapur is a small village located in the district of Jalaun in the state of Uttar Pradesh in India. It has a population of about 616 people living in around 95 households. The primary languages spoken are English and Hindi.
