= Naurejpur =

Naurojpur
- village
- Interactive map of Naurojpur
- Country: India
- State: Uttar Pradesh

Government
  - Body: Gram panchayat

Languages
  - Official: Hindi
- Time zone: UTC+5:30 (IST)

Naurojpur is a village in the district of Jalaun, Uttar Pradesh India, about 10 km from the Yamuna River. One can reach Naurejpur by taking a bus from Auraiya or Jalaun to Kuthaund, which is 5 km from Naurejpur. The current Pradhan of Naurejpur is Bhure. One Jadaun family lives in the village. It is a very socially, educationally and economically backward village.
