= Konch (community development block) =

Community development block in Gaya district, Bihar, India

Konch कोंच
- Community development block
- Location in Bihar, India
- Coordinates: 24°55′31″N 84°46′16″E
- Country: India
- State: Bihar
- District: Gaya

Languages
  - Official: Magadhi, Hindi
- Time zone: UTC+5:30 (IST)
- ISO 3166 code: IN-BR
- Website: gaya.bih.nic.in

Konch is a community development block of Gaya district in Bihar, India. Konch(Konch Village/Konch Panchayat/Konch Thana-Police Station) is a typical village market area slowly taking shape of a sub-urban settlement and centre of small business (mainly shops selling items such as grocery, building materials, agricultural inputs like fertilizer, seeds, small farm equipments etc.). Konch has very important temple known as Koncheswar Mahadev belonging to the later Gupta period which now has been taken under the protection of Archaeological Survey of India (ASI).

Konch has a varied demographic mix of population and is home of people from different Hindu castes and religions. It is house of a few historic relics like Shiva Temple on the outskirts of the block. Konch has a small Muslim population also and is a model of the Hindu-Muslim unity that is common to India. Konch has a well maintained government hospital, high schools, Government Primary/Middle Schools and police station.

Konch is underdeveloped, lacking infrastructure like roads, electricity and urbanization. The exposure of the block and adjoining villages have to the presence of Naxalite–Maoist insurgency in central Bihar, such as the Bara massacre or the Jail Break in the adjoining Jehanabad District, has impeded development.

The situation has changed after the last assembly election and now developmental work seems to have subdued some of the ill-effects of the reign of terror. Implementation of central as well as state projects is paving the way for development and prosperity of the area. The reference of this block comes into various development related projects like Rajiv Gandhi Gramin Vidyutikaran Yojna or The Pradhan Mantri Gram Sadak Yojana

== Transportation ==
Gaya is well connected to the rest of India and the world by roadways, railways and airways.
Konch is only 28 kilometers from Gaya town.

Air: The nearest airport from Konch is Gaya International Airport and Patna Airport. Indian Airlines, Indigo, Jet Airways, Kingfisher Airlines connect Patna to Calcutta, Bombay, Delhi, Ranchi, Lucknow and various other cities.
Rail: The nearest railway station is Gaya. Gaya is the second most important and largest railway station in Bihar after Patna. It is a junction and is connected to all the four metropolis New Delhi, Kolkata, Mumbai and Chennai through Important Broad Gauge Routes (direct trains). Road: Konch is well connected by road to Gaya, Patna, Aurangabad
Local Transport: City Bus, Taxis, Tongas, Auto Rickshaws, Cycle Rickshaws are available.
Bus: Regular direct bus services are available from Gaya, Patna, Ranchi, Tata(Jamshedpur), Dhanbad, Aurangabad. Bihar State Tourism Development Corporation and Bihar State Road Transport Corporation run buses to connect Gaya from Patna, Ranchi, Jamshedpur and other major cities.

== Prominent villages in the block ==
DADREJI, Tetariya, Jaitiya, Kaudia, Iguna, Parsawan, Murera, Adai, Tankuppa and Ghorhan are among the prominent villages in Konch block. Parsawan is one of the panchayat in Konch. Tetariya village is near Konch- known due to ITI College which is under construction.

Lodipur is one of the villages with above average literacy rate in the Konch block. Moke & Lodipur are closely connected through relations & culture. It is connected by road with Gaya district and Aurangabad district of Bihar. It is located on a state highway. Konch Bihar Legislative Assembly MLA is Anil Kumar The village Konch figures in the recent release of Pradhan Mantri Gramin Sadak Yojna data release by the Government of India.

Mananpur (also referred as Madanpur), Korap, Mudera, Angra, Aanti, Maduka are some of the big villages of Konch blocks.

Parihans and Korap has the history of producing a pool of talents and eminent personalities like Late Kali Prasad (ICS/IAS), Shri Balmiki Prasad Sharma (IPS), Shri Ramanugrah Sharma (Educationist) among other notable people. Parihans has the distinction of birthplace of freedom fighter Vir Shri Keswar Singh who was a close associate of Swami Sahajanand Saraswati and Subhas Chandra Bose and an important leader of Kisan andolan during the freedom struggle in Magadh region.Late Ramdutt singh was a Freedom Fighter in Konch. It has also been the place where prominent freedom fighters and social reformers like Swami Sahajanand Saraswati, Jay Prakash Narayan, and Vinoba Bhave have spent considerable amount of time.

Aanti is a big village, dominated by Rajputs and has a credential of good residential schools in the area. Mahmudpur is also a well-known village in the area and so is Maduka with Pathans making up a large proportion of the population.

Dadreji is emerging as the new semi-urban center for the cluster of nearby villages. major population of village is hindu upper caste, Bhumihar Brahmans presence is dominant here.

== Education ==
Schools: affiliated with Bihar Board of Education

- Gandhi High School, Konch Bazaar (selected as a MODEL school)
- Saraswati Shishu Mandir, Konch Bazaar
- Government Middle School, Konch Bazaar
- Government Middle School, Dadreji
- Government Girls Middle School, Konch Dih
- Kasturba Gandhi Vidyalay, Konch Dih
- Government Girls High School, Konch Dih
- Bal sramik vidyalay, Konch Dih

== Financial Institutions ==
- State Bank of India
- Madhya Bihar Gramin Bank
- Indian Postal Office
- Punjab National Bank

== Religious places ==
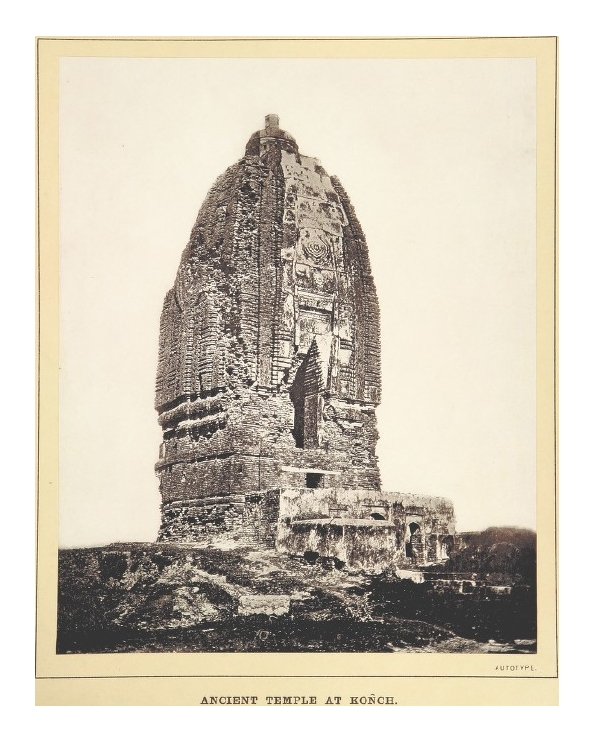

* Koncheswar Mahadev: Koncheswar Mandir brings to mind the image of the Mahabodhi Temple at Bodh Gaya. Externally the Konch Temple differs from the two great temples at Nalanda and Buddha Gaya, in having its sides curved instead of being straight lines from top to bottom. It differs also in its style of ornamentation, as there are no niches and consequently no enshrined figures. Each wall is divided extemally into seven faces by deeply-recessed upright lines, which form part of the original construction. Temple was built in 8th century A.D(Moreover, tradition points to Bhairavendra, who lived about 1459 A.D., as the builder of the Konch temple). The temple is built of properly shaped, well-burnt bricks though of different sizes. Some bricks measure 11" X 5½" X 2¾", some 9" X 4¾" X 2¾" and others 13" X 7½" X 2¾". The use of different types of bricks is, perhaps, an indication that the temple has undergone extensive repairs from time to time, as held by Cunningham and Beglar of the Archaeological Survey of India. J.D. Beglar, Assistant Archaeological Suryeyor at that time, had visited the place during 1872-73 and he has mentioned in his report(1878)that the tower was surmounted by a cylindrical pinnacle as in the case of the temple of Bodh Gaya. This pinnacle had a hemispherical top. The most interesting piece inside the shrine is a panel sculpture of the Dashavataras representing Vishnu. This temple of Shiva worship is clearly of Brahmanical origin.

- Radha-Krishna Thakurwari Konch Bazaar(Founder: Late Nirdhin Sharma; situated on Konch Bazaar-Middle School Road)
- Konch Sun Temple (Surya Mandir)Konch Bazaar (situated next to Konch Bus stand- Talab)
- Devi Sthan Mandir Konch Bazaar (situated next to Government Middle School)
- Sarswati Mandir Konch Dih (situated next to Konch Tekari Road)
- Konch Masjid (Mosque)Konch Bazaar
