= Mangalpur =

Mangalapura may refer to:

== India ==
- Mangalpur, a location in Balasore district, Odisha
- Mangalpur, Kanpur Dehat, a town in Uttar Pradesh
- Mangalapuram or Mangalore, a city in Karnataka

== Nepal ==
- Mangalpur, Nepal, a location
