= Saidnagar =

- village
- Location in Uttar Pradesh, India
- Coordinates: 25.98°N 79.47°E
- Country: India
- State: Uttar Pradesh

Government
  - Type: Democratic
  - Body: Municipal Board
  - Pradhan: sitaram pal

Population (2014)
  - Total: 5,743

Languages
  - Official: Hindi
- Time zone: UTC+5:30 (IST)
- PIN: 285223
- Telephone code: +915162
- Vehicle registration: UP 92

Saidnagar (Siddh Nagar) is a village near Orai in Jalaun district, Uttar Pradesh, India. In the village there is a river and two temples, which attract many people and tourists.

== History ==
The name of the village was Siddhnagar which means holy place but after a time period it became Saidnagar. The village is famous for the temples present at here since a long time. The village comes in to Bundelkhand. Betaba river goes through the village.

== Climate ==
Saidnagar has a composite climate, with temperatures high in summer and low in winter. Relative humidity remains about 40–50%. The climate of Orai district is characterized by a hot summer and general dryness, except for rainfall during the southwest monsoon season. The year has four seasons. The cold season lasts from December to February; January's minimum temperature is 7.1 C. The hot season is from March until the first week of June. May is the hottest month of the year with an average temperature of 42.1 C. The southwest monsoon runs from the middle of June until the end of September. October and middle of November constitute the post-monsoon or retreating monsoon season. The normal annual rainfall of Orai is 793.8 mm. About 90.4% of annual rainfall is received during monsoon season; only 9.6% of annual rainfall takes place between October and May. The humidity is lowest in April and varies between 26% and 83% throughout the year.

== Transport ==
A town Ait is 10 km from the village. Taxies are available to travel from ait to saidnagar. Good transportation system.

== Temples ==
=== Raj Rajeshwari maa akshara devi mandir ===
The temple is considered beautiful and the biggest in the district. The temple is situated on a rocky area and has a pond called 'Mukudda'. It is said that when Ravana was going to lanka with Sita he stopped his chariot here for some time because there are so many marks of the wheels of chariot and their footsteps. The temple attracts so many people toward himself.

=== Raktadantika Devi Mandir ===
It is also a big temple in saidnagar just close to the river. It also attracts a lot of people.
