= Nathuram =

Given name

Nathuram is a male given name from India. Notable people with it include:

- Nathuram Godse (1910–1949), assassin of Mahatma Gandhi
- Nathuram Mirdha (1921–1996), parliamentarian
- Nathuram Premi (1881–1960), writer
- Nathuram Shakyawar (1925–2005), politician
- Nathuram Sharma (1859–1932), poet
