= Kalpi Assembly constituency =

Constituency of the Uttar Pradesh legislative assembly in India

Coordinates: 26.12°N 79.75°E

Kalpi
- Constituency No. 220 for the Uttar Pradesh Legislative Assembly

Constituency details
- Country: India
- Region: North India
- State: Uttar Pradesh
- District: Jalaun
- Total electors: 229331
- Reservation: None

Member of Legislative Assembly
- 18th Uttar Pradesh Legislative Assembly
- Incumbent Vinod Chaturvedi
- Party: Samajwadi Party
- Elected year: 2022
- Preceded by: Narendra Pal Singh

Kalpi is a constituency of the Uttar Pradesh Legislative Assembly covering the town of Kalpi in the Jalaun district of Uttar Pradesh, India.

Kalpi is one of five assembly constituencies in the Jalaun Lok Sabha constituency. Since 2008, this assembly constituency is numbered 220 amongst 403 constituencies.

Currently this seat belongs to Samajwadi Party candidate Vinod Chaturvedi who won in last Assembly election of 2022 Uttar Pradesh Legislative Assembly election defeating NISHAD Party candidate Chhote Singh by a margin of 2,816 votes.

== Members of the Legislative Assembly ==
Year	Member	Party
1957	Virendra Shah Judeo	Independent
1957	Garib Das	Praja Socialist Party
1962	Shiv Sampati Sharma	Indian National Congress
1967	Choudhry Shanker Singh	Bharatiya Jana Sangh
1969	Shiv Sampati Sharma	Indian National Congress
1974	Bir Singh	Bharatiya Jana Sangh
1977	Choudhry Shanker Singh	Janata Party
1980	Choudhry Shanker Singh	Janata Party (Secular)
1985	Badri Singh	Indian National Congress
1989	Choudhry Shanker Singh	Janata Dal
1991	Sriram Pal	Bahujan Samaj Party
1993	Sriram Pal	Bahujan Samaj Party
1996	Sriram Pal	Bahujan Samaj Party
2002	Arun Kumar Mehrotra	Bharatiya Janata Party
2007	Chhote Singh	Bahujan Samaj Party
2012	Uma Kanti	Indian National Congress
2017	Narendra Pal Singh	Bharatiya Janata Party
2022	Vinod Chaturvedi	Samajwadi Party

== Election results ==
=== 2027 ===
2027 Uttar Pradesh Legislative Assembly election: Kapli
Party	Candidate	Votes	%	±%
INDIA				
NDA				
BSP				
NOTA	None of the above			
Majority				
Turnout				
gain from		Swing		

=== 2022 ===
2022 Uttar Pradesh Legislative Assembly election: Kalpi
Party	Candidate	Votes	%	±%
SP	Vinod Chaturvedi	69,782	29.48	
NISHAD	Chhote Singh	66,966	28.29	
BSP	Shyam Pal	64,683	27.32	+3.55
INC	Uma Kanti	15,195	6.42	−16.76
Independent	Ainul Hasan Mansoori	8,146	3.44	
Jan Adhikar Party	Jishan	2,470	1.04	
NOTA	None of the above	1,706	0.72	−0.32
Majority		2,816	1.19	−21.26
Turnout		236,741	59.99	−0.75
SP gain from BJP		Swing		

=== 2017 ===
2017 Uttar Pradesh Legislative Assembly Election: Kalpi
Party	Candidate	Votes	%	±%
BJP	Narendra Pal Singh	105,988	46.22	
BSP	Chhote Singh	54,504	23.77	
INC	Uma Kanti	53,160	23.18	
Independent	Balgovind	6,468	2.82	
NOTA	None of the above	2,356	1.04	
Majority		51,484	22.45	
Turnout		229,331	60.74	
BJP gain from INC		Swing		
