= Bhanu Pratap Singh Verma =

Indian politician

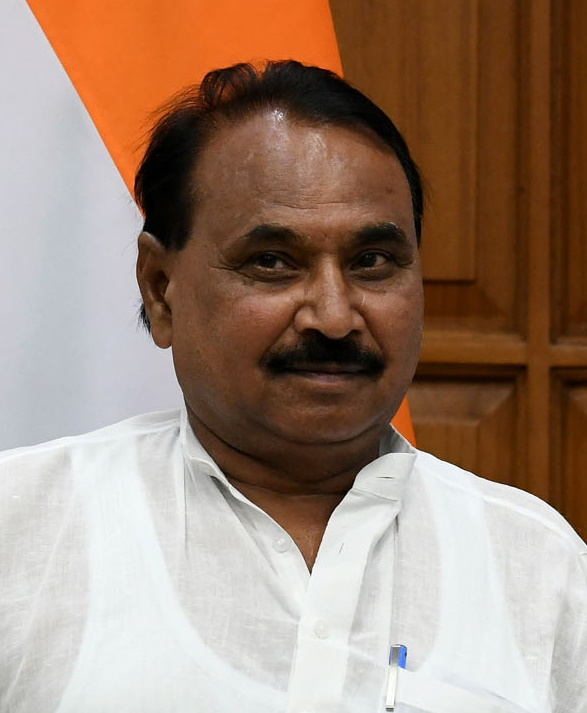

Minister of State for Micro, Small and Medium Enterprises
- In office 8 July 2021 – 11 June 2024
- Prime Minister: Narendra Modi
- Preceded by: Pratap Chandra Sarangi
- Succeeded by: Shobha Karandlaje

Member of Parliament, Lok Sabha
- In office 16 May 2014 – 4 June 2024
- Preceded by: Ghanshyam Anuragi
- Succeeded by: Narayan Das Ahirwar
- Constituency: Jalaun
- In office 1996–1999
- Preceded by: Gaya Prasad Kori
- Succeeded by: Brijlal Khabri
- Constituency: Jalaun

Member of Uttar Pradesh Legislative Assembly
- In office 1993–1996
- Succeeded by: Chain Sukh Bharti
- Constituency: Konch

Personal details
- Born: 15 July 1957 (age 69) Jalaun, Uttar Pradesh, India
- Party: Bharatiya Janata Party
- Spouse: Rammurti Verma (m. 1972)
- Children: 5 Sons
- Parents: Sumer Verma (father); Sumitra Verma (mother)
- Education: M.A., LL.B.
- Profession: Advocate, Agriculturist, Social Worker
- Source

Bhanu Pratap Singh Verma (born 15 July 1957) is an Indian politician and former Minister of State in Ministry of Micro, Small and Medium Enterprises in Government of India. He stood for the 1996 Lok Sabha elections as BJP candidate and is Former Member of Parliament from Jalaun. He belong to the Kori community of Uttar Pradesh.

He won 1996, 1998, 2004, 2014, 2019 general election from Jalaun constituency.

== Political career ==
- 1991-92: Member, Uttar Pradesh Legislative Assembly
- 1996 – 1998: Elected to 11th Lok Sabha
- 1998 – 1999: Re-elected to 12th Lok Sabha (2nd term)
- 2001: Vice-president, S.C Morcha, B.J.P., Uttar Pradesh; Member, National Council, B.J.P.
- 2004 – 2009: Re-elected to 14th Lok Sabha (3rd term)
- 2011 – 2013: President, B.J.P. SC Morcha, Uttar Pradesh
- 2014, 2019: Re-elected to 16th Lok Sabha (4th term)
- 12 June 2014 onwards: Member, House Committee
- 14 Aug. 2014 onwards: Member, Committee on Welfare of Scheduled Castes and Scheduled Tribes
- 1 Sep. 2014 onwards: Member, Standing Committee on Energy; Member, Consultative Committee, Ministry of Petroleum and Natural Gas
- May 2019 onwards: re-elected to 17th Lok Sabha (5th term)
