= Rampura, Jalaun =

Coordinates: 26°20′07″N 79°21′49″E

Rampura
- Town
- Interactive map of Rampura
- Country: India
- State: Uttar Pradesh
- District: Jalaun

Population (2011)
  - Total: 21,567

Languages
  - Official: Hindi
- Time zone: UTC+5:30 (IST)
- PIN: 285127
- Vehicle registration: up 92
- Website: up.gov.in

Rampura is a town and a nagar panchayat in Jalaun district in the Indian state of Uttar Pradesh.

== Demographics ==
As of 2001 India census, Rampura is a Block area of District Jalaun, situated approximately 2.5 km away to river Pahuj(has good drainage in each season). Rampura covers approx 90 km^{2} region and had a population of 20,614. Males constitute 54% of the population and females 46%. Rampura has an average literacy rate of 57%, lower than the national average of 59.5%: male literacy is 68%, and female literacy is 45%. In Rampura, 17% of the population is under 6 years of age. Rampura in not only such area but also entire Jalaun district is in backward region. Fewer people know the district Jalaun, because there is neither good leader nor any Public sector organizations or Industry.

== Places of interest ==
Approximately 2.5 km from the city there is a temple called "Bhairav Ji Mandir". Rampura is also famous for historical fort. Nearest famous temples are Panchnada, Jalaun Devi, Jwala Devi and Karan Khera. Nowadays it is becoming a business point and transport centre for many business entities.
