= Nathuram Shakyawar =

Indian politician

Nathuram Ramchandra Shakyawar
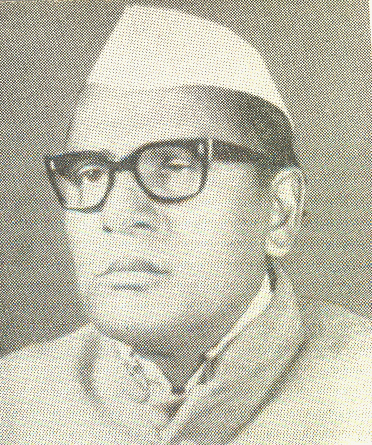
- Nathuram Ramchandra Shakyawar

Member of Parliament
- In office 1980–1984
- President: Neelam Sanjiva Reddy
- Prime Minister: Indira Gandhi
- Vice President: Mohammad Hidayatullah
- Preceded by: Ramcharan Dohre
- Succeeded by: Lachhi Ram
- Constituency: Jalaun

Personal details
- Born: Nathuram Ramchandra Shakyawar; 14 November 1925 Jagnewa Village, Jalaun, Uttar Pradesh, British India
- Died: 31 July 2005 (aged 79)
- Party: Indian National Congress
- Spouse: Bhagwai
- Children: 2s, 4d
- Parent: Ramchandra Shakyawar
- Education: M.A, L.L.B
- Alma mater: D.A.V College, Kanpur

Nathuram Ramchandra Shakyawar (14 November 1925 – 31 July 2005) was an Indian politician and social worker who was a Member of Parliament of 7th Lok Sabha from Jalaun constituency of Uttar Pradesh. While he was a student, Shakyawar took part in the Quit India Movement in 1942 and was sent to jail. He also participated in the "Jail Bharo Andolan" and was imprisoned again. Shakyawar died on 31 July 2005, at the age of 79. Shakyawar belong to Koli caste.
