= Ghanshyam Anuragi =

Indian politician

Member of Parliament, 15th Lok Sabha
- In office May 2009 – May 2014
- Preceded by: Bhanu Pratap Singh Verma
- Constituency: Jalaun

Personal details
- Born: 15 December 1972 (age 53) village Khera Shilajit, Hamirpur, (Uttar Pradesh)
- Citizenship: India
- Party: Bhartiya Janta Party
- Spouse: Dr. Kalpana Anuragi
- Children: 1 son & 1 daughter.
- Parent(s): Deshraj Anuragi (Father) & Ganeshi Devi (mother)
- Education: Sampurnanand Sanskrit University & Bundelkhand University
- Profession: Agriculturist, Advocate & Politician
- Committees: Member of one committee

Ghanshyam Anuragi is an Indian politician and a Member of Parliament of India. Anuragi is a member of the 15th Lok Sabha and represents the Jalaun constituency of Uttar Pradesh. He is a member of the Samajwadi Party political party.

== Early life and education ==
Ghanshyam Anuragi was born in Kori family in the village Khera Shilajit, Hamirpur in the state of Uttar Pradesh. He received his LL.B degree from Bundelkhand University and subsequently got his M.A degree from Sampurnanand Sanskrit University in Varanasi. Anuragi started working as an advocate and agriculturist before joining politics.

== Political career ==
Ghanshyam Anuragi has been in active politics since early 1990s and joined the Samajwadi Party. He is a first time M.P and is also a member of one committee. Anuragi succeeded three time M.P Bhanu Pratap Singh Verma of Bhanu Pratap Singh Verma from the same Lok Sabha constituency. Prior to entering the Lok Sabha, he was a Gram Pradhan and also Chairman of Zila Panchayat.

== Posts held ==
#	From	To	Position
01	2004	2007	Member, State Population and Development Commission, U.P.
02	2009	2014	Member, 15th Lok Sabha
03	2009	2014	Member, Committee on Water Resources

== See also ==
- 15th Lok Sabha
- Lok Sabha
- Politics of India
- Parliament of India
- Government of India
- Samajwadi Party
- Jalaun (Lok Sabha constituency)
