= Mangalpur, Kanpur Dehat =

Mangalpur
- Village
- Location in Uttar Pradesh, India
- Coordinates: 26°31′0″N 79°41′0″E
- Country: India
- State: Uttar Pradesh
- District: Kanpur Dehat
- Elevation: 133 m (436 ft)

Languages
  - Official: Hindi
- Time zone: UTC+5:30 (IST)
- PIN: 209310
- Telephone code: 05114
- Vehicle registration: UP-77
- Coastline: 0 kilometres (0 mi)

Mangalpur is a village and a gram panchayat in Kanpur Dehat district in the Indian state of Uttar Pradesh.

== Geography ==
Mangalpur is situated on the banks of the Pata Canal.The district headquarters is nearly 30 km away at Mati in the Kanpur Dehat district in the Indian state of Uttar Pradesh.

== History ==
Mangalpur is first noted in Indian political history in 1901 when the British came for the first time to Mangalpur from Bithur. They established a police station named Thana Mangalpur. Many Mangalpur villagers took part in the Indian freedom fight.

== Nearby Cities & Towns ==
- Towards South - Orai and Jhansi.
- Towards West - Auraiya, Etawah
- Towards East- Raniya, Kanpur
- Towards North- Jhinjhak

== Places of interest ==
- Chaturbhuj Baba temple
- Lalmathi Mandir
- Great Pond
