= Government Medical College, Jalaun =

Medical college in Uttar Pradesh, India

Manyavar Kanshi Ram Ji Government Allopathic Medical College
- Other name: GMC Jalaun
- Type: State Medical College
- Established: 2013; 13 years ago
- Academic affiliations: Atal Bihari Vajpayee Medical University (2021 – present); King George's Medical University, Lucknow (2013–2021)
- Principal: Dr. Arvind Trivedi
- Students: 500
- Undergraduates: 100 (MBBS)
- Location: Orai, Jalaun, Uttar Pradesh, India; 25.999845°N 79.4734025°E
- Acronym: GMC Jalaun
- Website: www.gmcjalaun.com

Manyavar Kanshi Ram Ji Government Allopathic Medical College, Jalaun is a government medical college located in Orai city of Jalaun district, Uttar Pradesh, India. This college has a special component plan. Every year 100 students are allowed to take admission in the M.B.B.S. course by competitive examinations.
