= Koncheswar Mahadev =

Coordinates: 24.9337°N 84.7716°E

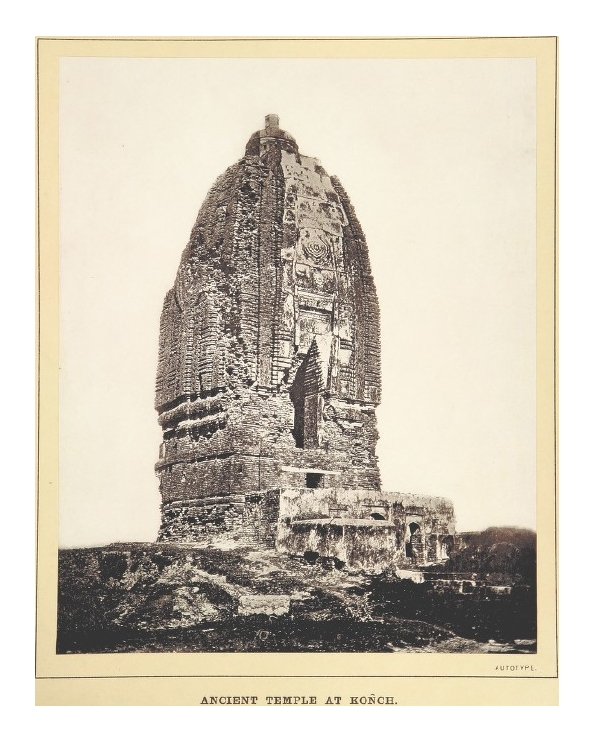
Photograph by Joseph Belgar

Koncheswar Mahadev is a Shiva temple in Konch, Gaya district, Bihar, India.

The Shiva temple enshrining Shivalinga and dedicated to Koncheshwarnath and is made of bricks of different sizes. It has a heavy nagara (curvilinear) sikhara. Koncheswar Temple brings to mind the image of the Mahabodhi Temple at Bodh Gaya. Externally the Konch Temple differs from the two great temples at Nalanda and Buddha Gaya, in having its sides curved instead of being straight lines from top to bottom. It differs also in its style of ornamentation, as there are no niches and consequently no enshrined figures. Each wall is divided extemally into seven faces by deeply-recessed upright lines, which form part of the original construction.

The use of different types of bricks is, perhaps, an indication that the temple has undergone extensive repairs from time to time, as held by Cunningham and Beglar of the Archaeological Survey of India. J.D. Beglar, Assistant Archaeological Suryeyor at that time, had visited the place during 1872-73 and he has mentioned in his report (1878) that the tower was surmounted by a cylindrical pinnacle as in the case of the temple of Bodh Gaya. This pinnacle had a hemispherical top. The most interesting piece inside the shrine is a panel sculpture of the Dashavataras representing Vishnu.

This temple of Shiva worship is clearly of Brahmanical origin. In the premises of the temple are found a number of images of Vishnu, Siva, Hara-Gauri, Ganesha, Surya etc. The temple is datable to circa 14th century ce.
