= Jagmanpur =

Coordinates: 28°17′N 79°14′E

Jagammanpur
- Village
- Interactive map of Jagammanpur
- Country: India
- State: Uttar Pradesh

Languages
  - Official: Hindi
- Time zone: UTC+5:30 (IST)
- Vehicle registration: UP-
- Coastline: 0 kilometres (0 mi)

Jagammanpur is a fort situated 9 km from Rampura in Uttar Pradesh. The major point of attraction here is a large masonry fort, which can be visited after obtaining permission from its owners.

Panch Nada, the conflux of five rivers, in the vicinity is another spot worth visiting. Kalpi, on National Highway 25, is major tourist attraction nearby.

The nearest airport is at Lucknow; Jhansi (145 km), orai (45 km) and Kanpur (70 km) are the nearest railheads.
