= Fatehpur Gayand =

Fatehpur Gayand Gadeya
- Village
- Location in Hardoi, Uttar Pradesh, India
- Coordinates: 27.42°N 80.12°E
- Country: India
- State: Uttar Pradesh
- District: Hardoi

Government
  - Type: UP Government

Area
  - Total: 0.125 km^{2} (0.048 sq mi)
- Elevation: 140.6 m (461 ft)

Population (2011)
  - Total: 8,000
  - Density: 64,000/km^{2} (170,000/sq mi)

Languages
  - Official: Hindi
- Time zone: UTC+5:30 (IST)
- PIN: 241124
- Vehicle registration: UP-30
- Website: www.hardoi.nic.in

Fatehpur Gayand is a village situated in Shahabad sub district of District Hardoi, Uttar Pradesh. Population of the village is lump som 8,000. Fatehpur Gayand is a Gram Panchayat and Nyay Panchayat under Todarpur Block of District Hardoi.

== Geography ==
Fatehpur Gayand is located at 27.42°N 80.12°E. It has an average elevation of 134 metres (440 ft). Fatehpur Gayand is located at 153 km from Lucknow (capital of Uttar Pradesh) and 473 from New Delhi (capital of India).

== Schools and Hospital ==
- Primary Hospital, Fatehpur Gayand
- Junior High School, Fatehpur Gayand [Estd in 1902]
- Public Prathmik Vidyalaya, Fatehpur Gayand
- Janseva Kendra, Fatehpur Gayand Prem Sagar

CSC Kendra Fatehpur gayand Prem Sagar

== Temples ==
- Durga Devi Mandir[Established by Late Shri Ram Pal Singh (Pujari) Ji]
- Durga Devi Mandir[Established by Late Shri Chandra Pal Singh (Pujari) Ji]
- Prachin Dakshini Devi Mandir, Fatehpur Gayand
- Prachin Shiv Mandir, Near - Junior High School, Fatehpur Gayand
