= Nadigaon =

- Town
- Location in Uttar Pradesh, India Nadigaon (India)
- Coordinates: 26°12′7″N 79°1′48″E
- Country: India
- State: Uttar Pradesh
- District: Jalaun

Population (2001)
  - Total: 17,175

Languages
  - Official: Hindi
- Time zone: UTC+5:30 (IST)
- Vehicle registration: UP
- Sex ratio: 54% male, 46% female ♂/♀
- Website: up.gov.in

Nadigaon is a town and a nagar panchayat in Jalaun district in the Indian state of Uttar Pradesh.

== Demographics ==
As of the 2001 Indian census, Nadigaon had a population of 17,175. Males constitute 54% of the population and females 46%. Nadigaon has an average literacy rate of 53%, lower than the national average of 59.5%: male literacy is 64%, and female literacy is 40%. In Nadigaon, 16% of the population is under 6 years of age. Nadigaon was under rule of Kings and The fort is situated at centre of the village. It is almost 21 km far from konch (UP). A river named "pahuj" passes through this village that is how its name became "Nadigaon".

== See also ==
Nadigaon fort, Rani ka bagh, Phul bagh, Krepal singh Dadi mahavidhiyala
