= Ramcharan Dohre =

Indian politician

Ramcharan Madarilal Dohre
- In office 1977–1980
- President: B. D. Jatti
- Prime Minister: Morarji Desai
- Preceded by: Seat established
- Succeeded by: Nathuram Shakyawar
- Constituency: Jalaun

Personal details
- Born: Ramcharan Madarilal Dohre; 9 July 1942 Death- 15 january 2026 at native Village Chhiriyasalempur village, Jalaun District, Uttar Pradesh, British Indian Empire
- Spouse: Smt. Shakuntala Devi Dohre
- Children: [2 son, 2 daughters]
- Parent: Madari Lal Dohre (father)
- Occupation: Teacher and agriculturist

Ramcharan Madarilal Dohre (born 9 July 1942) was an Indian politician, social worker and Member of Parliament of 6th Lok Sabha of Uttar Pradesh, India.
