= Jasrathpur =

Village in Uttar Pradesh, India

- Village
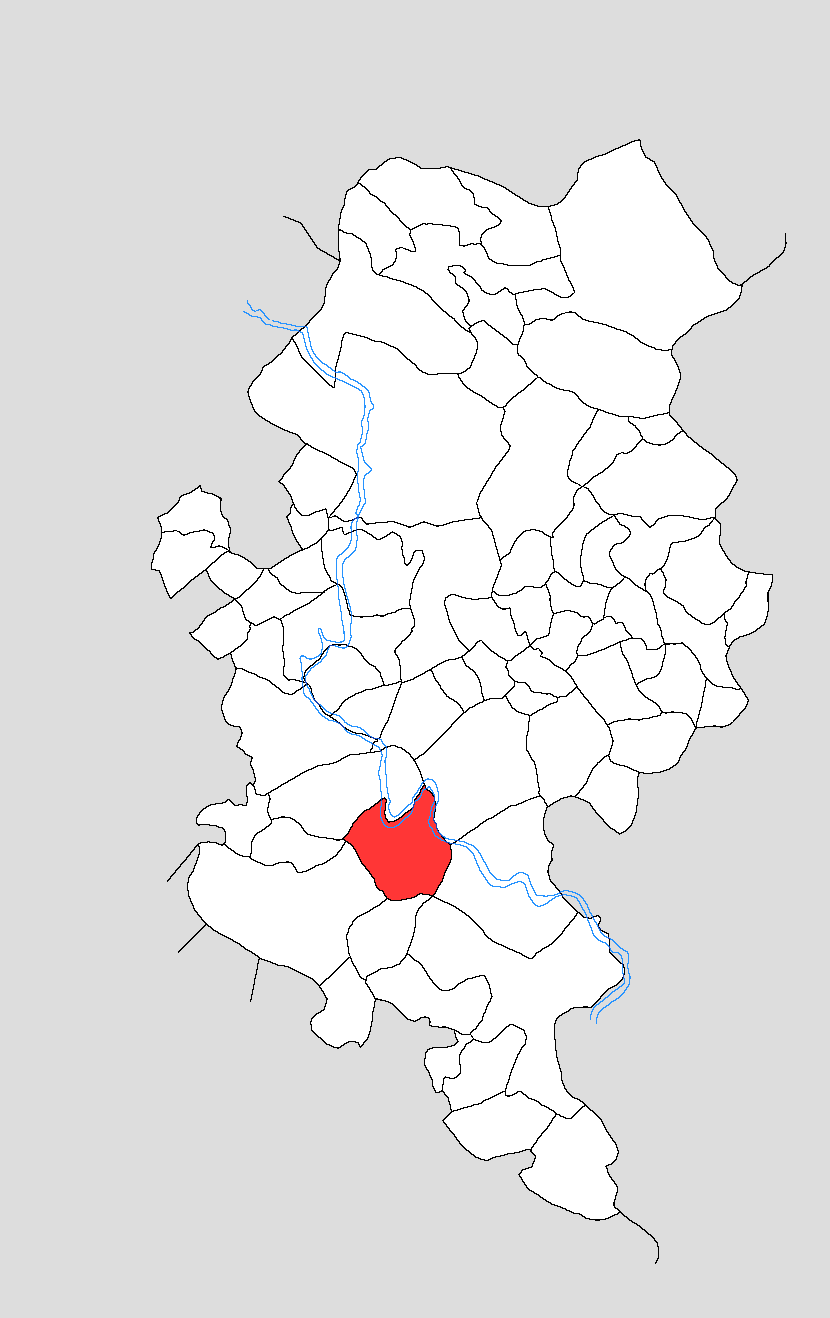
- Map showing Jasrathpur in Kotla block

- Location in Uttar Pradesh, India
- Coordinates: 27.23146°N 78.40049°E
- Country: India
- State: Uttar Pradesh
- District: Firozabad
- Tehsil: Firozabad

Area
  - Total: 3.804 km^{2} (1.469 sq mi)

Population (2011)
  - Total: 2,235
  - Density: 587.5/km^{2} (1,522/sq mi)
- Time zone: UTC+5:30 (IST)
- PIN: 283203

Jasrathpur is a village in Kotla block of Firozabad district, Uttar Pradesh, India. As of 2011, it had a population of 2,235, in 358 households.

== Demographics ==
As of 2011, Jasrathpur had a population of 2,235, in 358 households. This population was 53.5% male (1,195) and 46.5% female (1,040). The 0-6 age group numbered 420 (217 male and 203 female), making up 18.8% of the total population. 394 residents were members of Scheduled Castes, or 17.6% of the total.

The 1981 census recorded Jasrathpur as having a population of 946 people (516 male and 430 female), in 157 households and 157 physical houses.

The 1961 census recorded Jasrathpur as comprising 3 hamlets, with a total population of 634 people (351 male and 283 female), in 115 households and 99 physical houses. The area of the village was given as 558 acres and it had a medical practitioner at that point.

== Infrastructure ==
As of 2011, Jasrathpur had 2 primary schools; it did not have any healthcare facilities. Drinking water was provided by tap, hand pump, and tube well/borehole; there were no public toilets. The village did not have a post office or public library; there was at least some access to electricity for residential and agricultural (but not commercial) purposes. Streets were made of both kachcha and pakka materials.
