= Orai =

- City
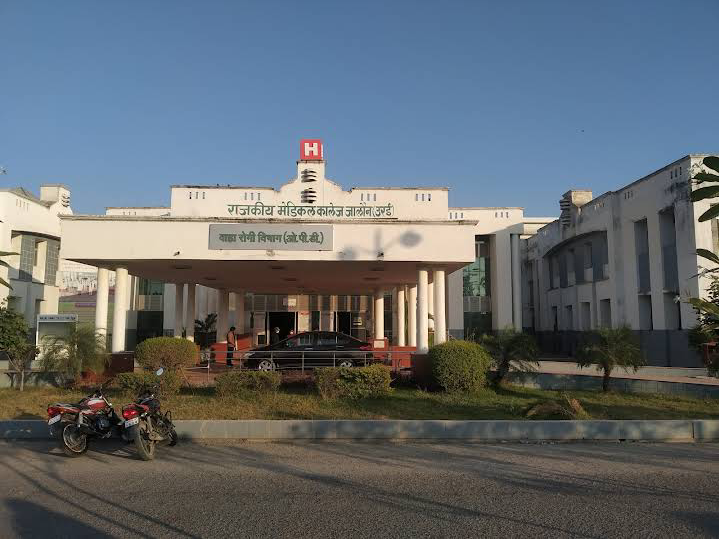
- Medical College, Orai

- Location in Uttar Pradesh, India
- Coordinates: 25.98°N 79.47°E
- Country: India
- State: Uttar Pradesh
- District: Jalaun
- Founded by: Raja Mahil
- Named after: Saint Uddalak

Government
  - MP: Narayan Das Ahirwar (Samajwadi Party)
  - MLA: Gaurishankar Verma(BJP)
- Elevation: 131 m (430 ft)

Population (2011)
  - Total: 515,000

Bundeli Languages
  - Official: Hindi
- Time zone: UTC+5:30 (IST)
- PIN: 285001
- Telephone code: +915162
- Vehicle registration: UP-92
- Sex ratio: 0.842 ♂/♀
- Literacy: 83.35%
- Website: jalaun.nic.in

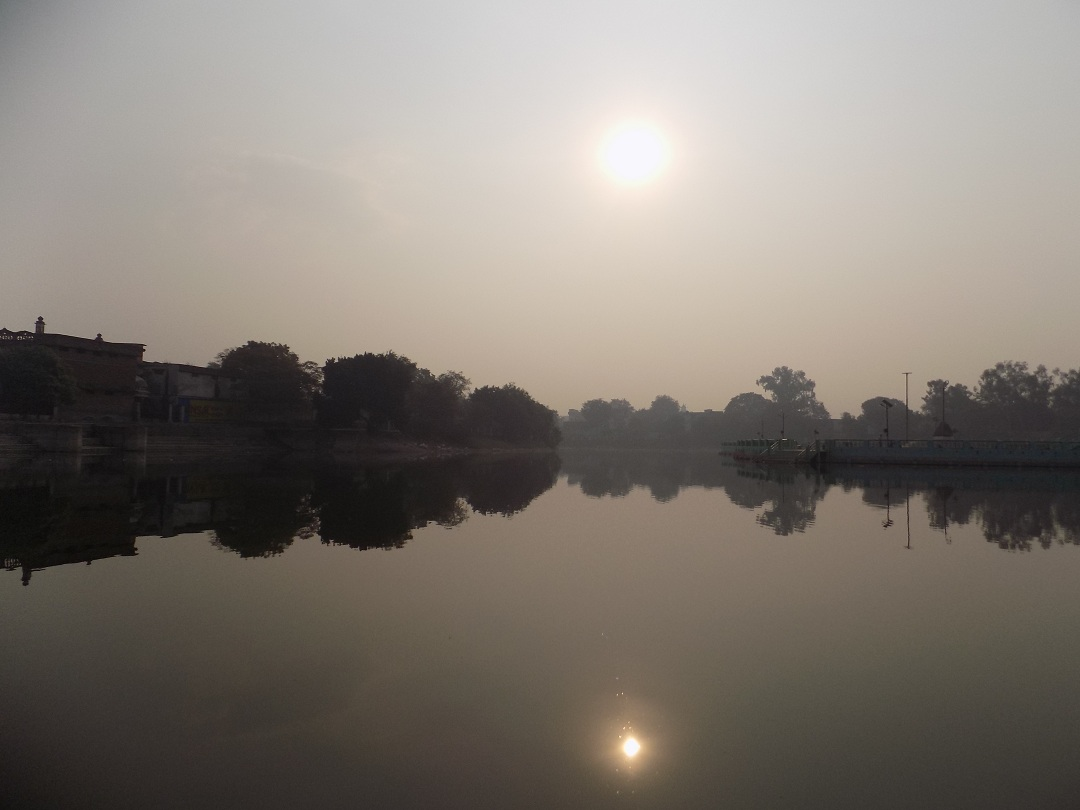
A view in Mahil talaab

Orai is a city in Uttar Pradesh, India, and the administrative headquarters of Jalaun District. All administrative offices of Jalaun District, including the District Collectorate, police, telecom and various other government organizations are located in this city. In 2019, Orai received the award of 'Fastest Mover' Small City among India (0.8–3.1 Lakh) under Swachh Survekshan, an annual cleanliness survey carried by the Quality Council of India

== Geography ==
Orai is located on 25.98°N 79.47°E. It has an average elevation of 144 metres (472 feet).

== Climate ==
Climate data for Orai (1991–2020)
Month	Jan	Feb	Mar	Apr	May	Jun	Jul	Aug	Sep	Oct	Nov	Dec	Year
Record high °C (°F)	30.8 (87.4)	36.0 (96.8)	42.4 (108.3)	47.0 (116.6)	47.4 (117.3)	47.8 (118.0)	45.0 (113.0)	45.0 (113.0)	39.8 (103.6)	39.0 (102.2)	35.8 (96.4)	30.5 (86.9)	47.8 (118.0)
Mean daily maximum °C (°F)	18.4 (65.1)	23.6 (74.5)	30.2 (86.4)	37.4 (99.3)	40.7 (105.3)	39.2 (102.6)	33.1 (91.6)	31.5 (88.7)	31.8 (89.2)	31.4 (88.5)	26.2 (79.2)	20.2 (68.4)	30.3 (86.5)
Mean daily minimum °C (°F)	8.2 (46.8)	12.0 (53.6)	17.0 (62.6)	23.2 (73.8)	26.1 (79.0)	27.9 (82.2)	26.6 (79.9)	25.9 (78.6)	25.2 (77.4)	21.6 (70.9)	15.7 (60.3)	10.4 (50.7)	20.0 (68.0)
Record low °C (°F)	1.4 (34.5)	−0.1 (31.8)	5.7 (42.3)	13.5 (56.3)	16.4 (61.5)	15.6 (60.1)	17.8 (64.0)	20.0 (68.0)	15.7 (60.3)	8.4 (47.1)	5.7 (42.3)	−1.7 (28.9)	−1.7 (28.9)
Average rainfall mm (inches)	12.0 (0.47)	3.3 (0.13)	5.5 (0.22)	1.9 (0.07)	6.3 (0.25)	44.8 (1.76)	140.8 (5.54)	189.3 (7.45)	90.9 (3.58)	14.2 (0.56)	1.4 (0.06)	3.3 (0.13)	513.6 (20.22)
Average rainy days	1.0	0.6	0.6	0.3	0.8	2.9	6.1	7.9	4.1	0.7	0.1	0.2	25.4
Average relative humidity (%) (at 17:30 IST)	68	59	48	38	39	49	72	77	69	52	54	58	57
Source: India Meteorological Department

== Demographics ==
Religions in Orai
Religion	Percent
Hindus	92%
Islam	6%
Jains	1.0%
Others†	1.0%
Distribution of religions †Includes Sikhs (0.5%), Jains (0.6%) Buddhists (<0.4%).

The city of Orai is governed by the Municipal Corporation, which comes under Orai Metropolitan Region. The total area of Orai Is 20.86 km^{2}.

The population of Orai in 2016 was 217,389, of which males and females comprised 111,987 and 105,402 respectively.

In 2011, there were 880 females for every 1,000 males. The ratio for children was 845 girls for every 1,000 boys. Children numbered 31,011 in Orai in 2016. There were 17,859 boys and 13,152 girls. Children form 7.01% of the total population of the city.

According to the 2011 Orai City Census data, the literacy rate was 82.35 percent.

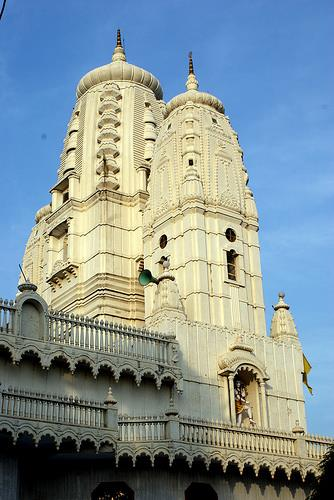
Radhakrishna mandir, Orai

== Education ==
- Government Medical College, Jalaun is a government medical college located in Orai.

== Transportation ==
Railway - Orai railway station is major Railway Station of the town. Here is three platforms at the Station and station code is ORAI. Jhansi - Kanpur railway line passing through Orai, many Superfast, Express and Passenger train halts here.
