= Madhogarh =

- Location in Uttar Pradesh, India Madhogarh (India)
- Coordinates: 26°16′34″N 79°11′13″E
- Country: India
- State: Uttar Pradesh
- District: Jalaun

Population (2001)
  - Total: 50,071

Languages
  - Official: Hindi
- Time zone: UTC+5:30 (IST)
- Vehicle registration: UP
- Website: up.gov.in

Madhogarh is a town and a nagar panchayat in Jalaun district in the Indian state of Uttar Pradesh.

== Demographics ==
At the 2001 India census, Madhogarh had a population of 50,071. Males constituted 54% of the population and females 46%. Madhogarh had an average literacy rate of 63%, higher than the national average of 59.5%: male literacy was 71%, and female literacy was 53%. In Madhogarh, 14% of the population was under 6 years of age.
