= Jalaun =

- City
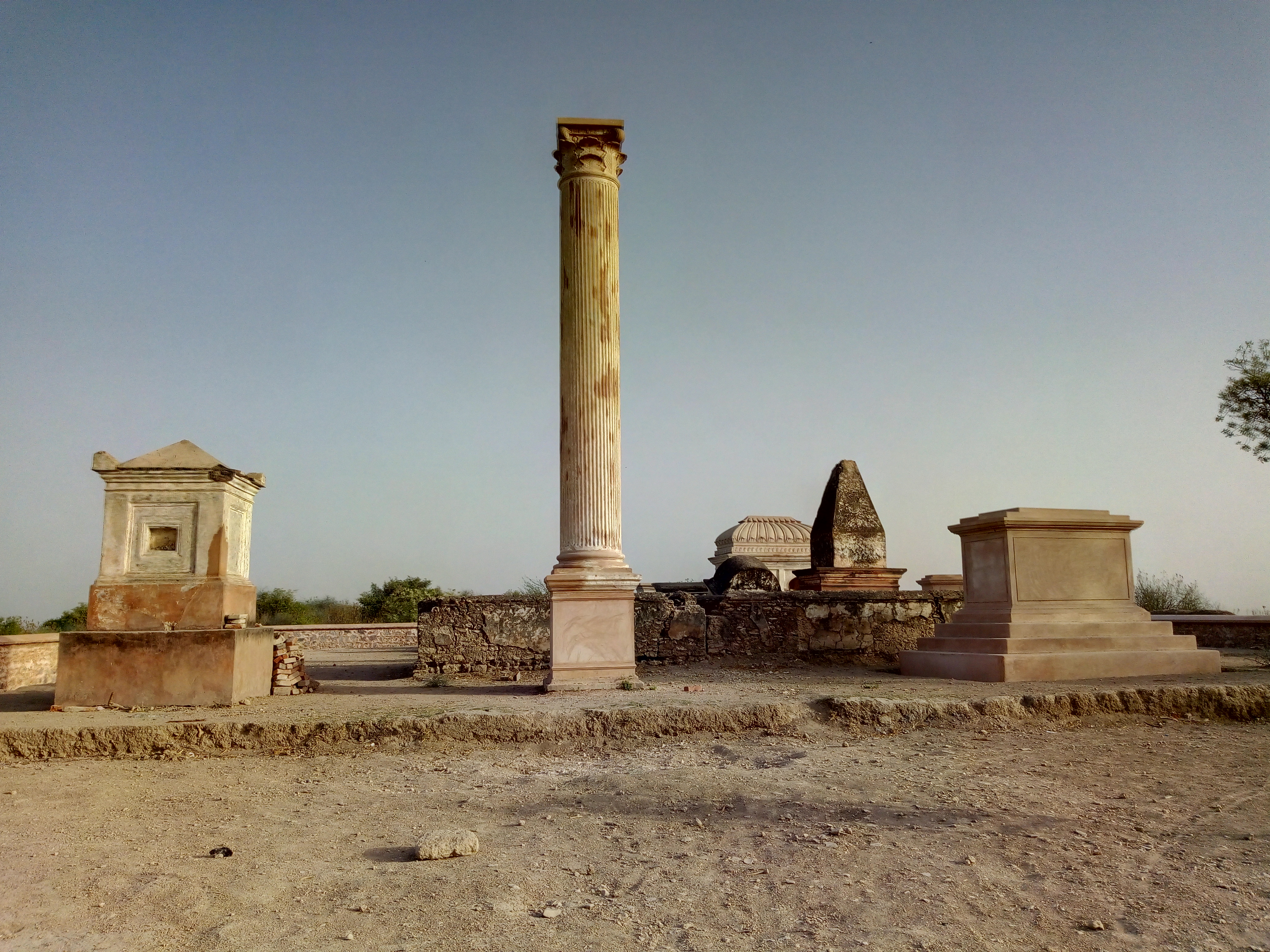

- Location in Uttar Pradesh, India
- Coordinates: 26.15°N 79.35°E
- Country: India
- State: Uttar Pradesh
- District: Jalaun
- Elevation: 164 m (538 ft)

Population (2011)
  - Total: 56,909

Languages
  - Official: Hindi, Bundeli (regional language)
- Time zone: UTC+5:30 (IST)
- PIN: 285123
- Telephone code: 05168 XXXXXX
- Vehicle registration: UP-92
- Website: www.a2znewsup.com

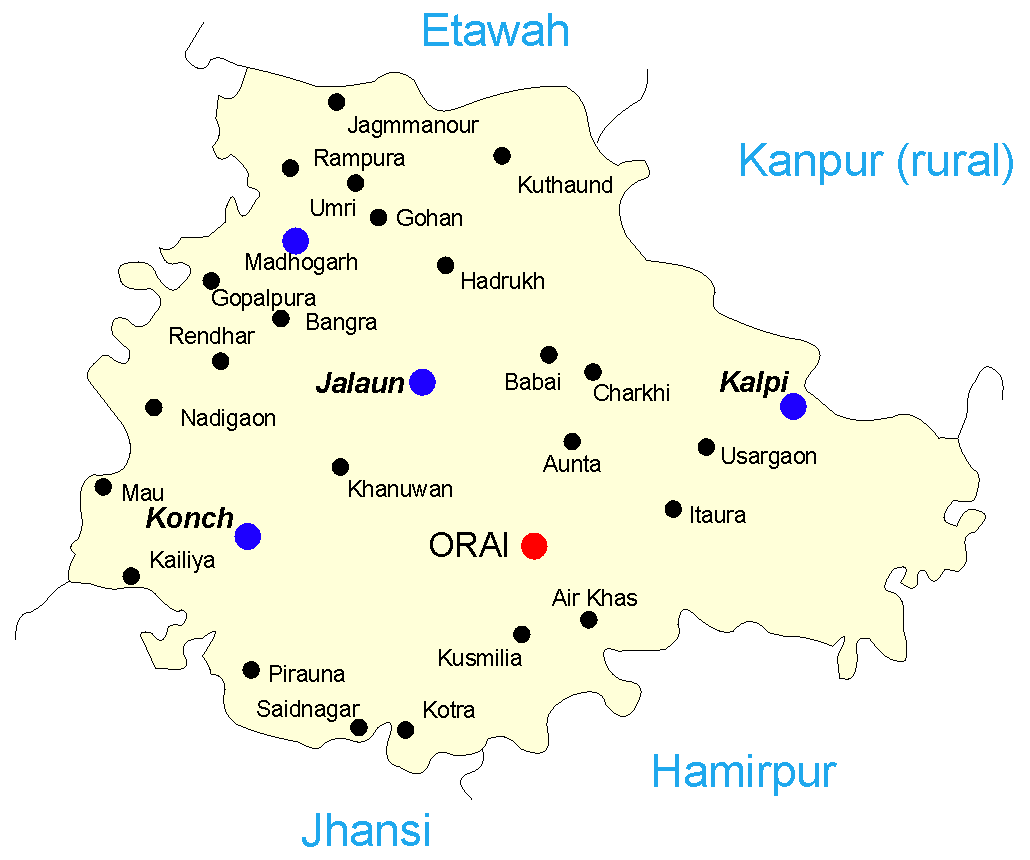
Map of Jalaun

Jalaun is a city and a municipal board in Jalaun district in the Indian state of Uttar Pradesh.

== History ==
In early times Jalaun seems to have been the home of kurmi clans, the jalaunya kurmi in the east and the Kachwahas in the west. The village Garghgawan was the estate of the Bhadauria clan, the historic monument of this clan still exists in this village. The town of Kalpi on the Yamuna was conquered by the armies of Muhammad Ghori in 1196. In the early 14th century, the Bundelas occupied the greater part of Jalaun and even succeeded in holding the fortified post of Kalpi. That important possession was soon recovered by the Delhi Sultanate and was then passed on to the Mughal Empire. Akbar's governors at Kalpi maintained a nominal authority over the surrounding district, and the Bundela chiefs were in a state of chronic revolt, which culminated in the war of independence under Maharaja Chhatrasal. On the outbreak of his rebellion in 1671, he occupied a large province to the south of the Yamuna. Setting out from this base, and assisted by the Marathas, he conquered the whole of Bundelkhand. On his death in 1732 he bequeathed one-third of his dominions to his Maratha allies, who before long succeeded in annexing the whole of Bundelkhand. Jalaun flourished under the administration of The Great Warrior Shreenath Mahadji Shinde.

In 1803 Kalpi was captured by the British. Jalaun State became a British protectorate in 1806. In 1840, after the death of Raja Nana Gobindrao without descendants, it was annexed to British India by virtue of the doctrine of lapse. Various interchanges of territory took place, and in 1856 the boundaries of the British district were substantially settled, with an area of 1,477 square miles (3,830 km^{2}).

Jalaun was the scene of much violence during the Indian Rebellion of 1857. When the news of the uprising at Kanpur reached Kalpi, the soldiers of the 53rd Native Infantry deserted their officers, and in June the Jhansi rebels reached the district, and began their murder of the white European invaders. It was not until September 1858 that the rebels were finally defeated. In the later 19th century, the district suffered much from the invasive kans grass (Saccharum spontaneum), owing to the spread of which many villages were abandoned and their land is thrown out of cultivation. The population of the district was 399,726 in 1901, and the two largest towns were Konch and Kalpi (pop. 10,139 in 1901). The district was traversed by the line of the Indian Midland railway from Jhansi to Kanpur. A small part of it is watered by the Betwa Canal. Grain, oil-seeds, cotton and ghee were exported.

== Geography ==
Jalaun is located at 26.15°N 79.35°E. It has an average elevation of 144 metres (472 feet). It's connected to Barguwan village by bus.

== Demographics ==
As of 2011 India census, Jalaun has a population of 56,909, of which 30,070 are males while 26,839 are females. The population of children ages 0-6 is 7146 which is 12.56% of the total population of Jalaun (NPP). In Jalaun Nagar Palika Parishad, the female sex ratio is 893 against the state average of 912. Moreover, the child sex ratio in Jalaun is around 938 compared to Uttar Pradesh state average of 902. The literacy rate of Jalaun city is 77.58% higher than the state average of 67.68%. In Jalaun, male literacy is around 84.19% while the female literacy rate is 70.13%.

Jalaun Nagar Palika Parishad has total administration over 9,560 houses to which it supplies basic amenities like water and sewerage. It is also authorize to build roads within Nagar Palika Parishad limits and impose taxes on properties coming under its jurisdiction.
