= Jalaun district =

Coordinates: 26°00′N 79°30′E

- District of Uttar Pradesh
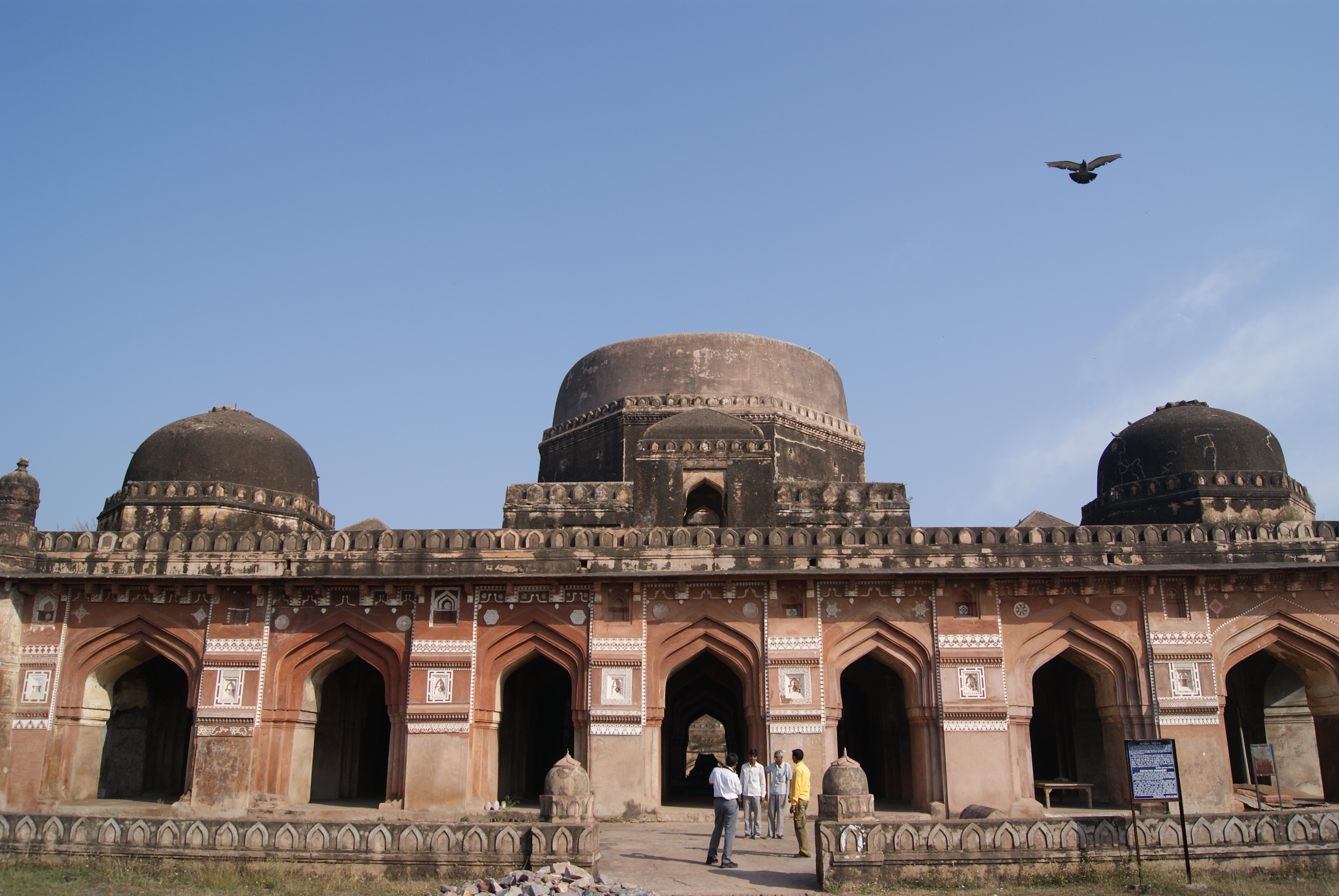
- Tomb of Lodhi Shah Badshah in Kalpi

- Location of Jalaun district in Uttar Pradesh
- Country: India
- State: Uttar Pradesh
- Division: Jhansi
- Headquarters: Orai
- Tehsils: 5

Government
  - District Magistrate: Mr. Rajesh Kumar Pandey IAS
  - Lok Sabha constituencies: Jalaun (Lok Sabha constituency)
  - Vidhan Sabha constituencies: 3

Area
  - Total: 4,565 km^{2} (1,763 sq mi)

Population (2011)
  - Total: 1,689,974
  - Density: 370.2/km^{2} (958.8/sq mi)
  - Urban: 1,008,900
- Time zone: UTC+05:30 (IST)
- Major highways: 1
- Website: http://jalaun.nic.in/

Jalaun district is a district of Uttar Pradesh, India. The district is named after the town of Jalaun, which was the former headquarters of a Maratha governor, but the administrative headquarters of the district is at Orai.

== Geography ==
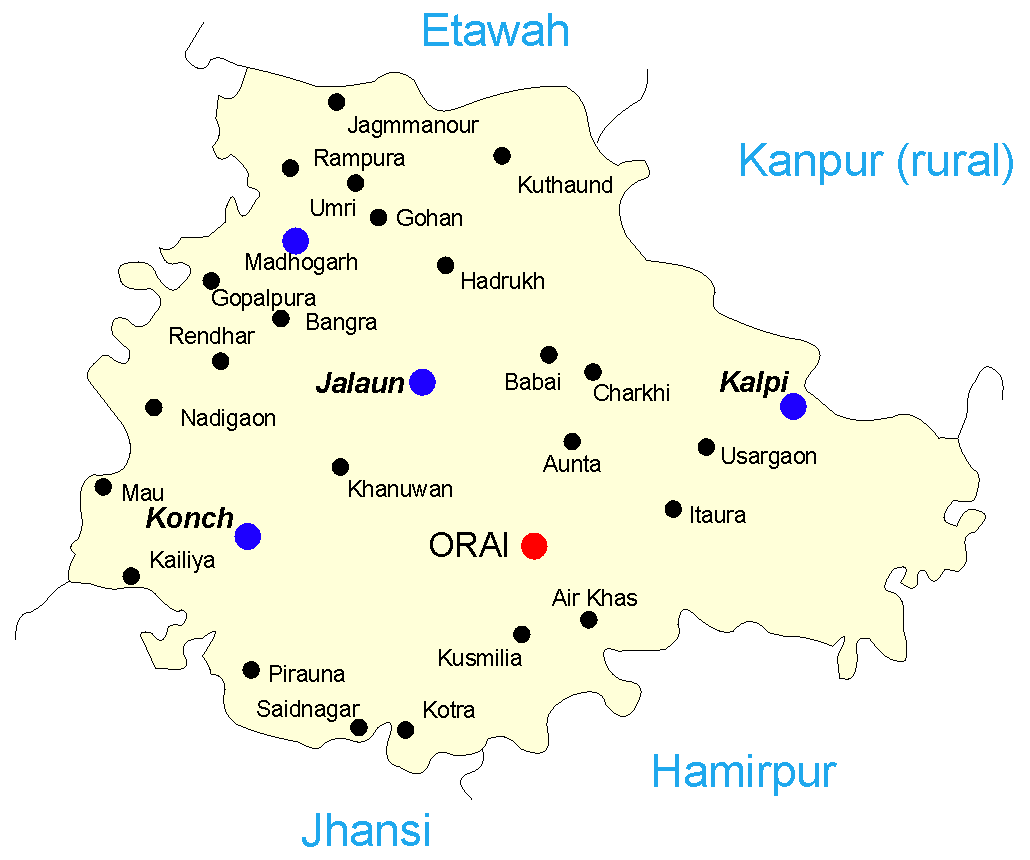
Map of Jalaun

Jalaun District is a part of the Jhansi Division. The district has an area of 4,565 km^{2}, and a population of 1,689,974 (2011 census), and a population density of 370 persons per km^{2}.

The district lies entirely within the level plains of Bundelkhand, north of the hill country, and is almost surrounded by the Yamuna River, which forms the northern boundary of the district, and its tributaries the Betwa, which forms the southern boundary of the district, and the Pahuj, which forms the western boundary. The central region thus enclosed is a dead level of cultivated land, almost destitute of trees, and dotted with villages. The southern portion presents an almost unbroken sheet of cultivation. The Non River flows through the centre of the district, which it drains by numerous small ravines.

The districts of Etawah and Kanpur Dehat lie to the north across the Yamuna, while Hamirpur District lies to the east and southeast, Jhansi District lies to the southeast, and Bhind District of Madhya Pradesh lies to the west cross the Pahuj.

== Tehsils ==
1. Jalaun
2. Orai
3. Kalpi
4. Konch
5. Madhogarh

== Economy ==
In 2006 the Ministry of Panchayati Raj named the district of Jalaun as one of the country's 250 most backward districts (out of a total of 640). It is one of the 34 districts in Uttar Pradesh currently receiving funds from the Backward Regions Grant Fund Programme (BRGF).

== Demographics ==
Historical population
Year	Pop.	±% p.a.
1901	424,017	—
1911	431,158	+0.17%
1921	431,164	+0.00%
1931	452,074	+0.47%
1941	515,476	+1.32%
1951	553,572	+0.72%
1961	663,168	+1.82%
1971	813,490	+2.06%
1981	986,238	+1.94%
1991	1,219,377	+2.14%
2001	1,454,452	+1.78%
2011	1,689,974	+1.51%

Religions in Jalaun district (2011)
Religion	Percent
Hinduism	89.33%
Islam	10.15%
Other or not stated	0.52%
Distribution of religions

According to the 2011 census Jalaun district has a population of 1,689,974, roughly equal to the nation of Guinea-Bissau or the US state of Idaho. This gives it a ranking of 296th in India (out of a total of 640). The district has a population density of 366 inhabitants per square kilometre (950/sq mi) . Its population growth rate over the decade 2001–2011 was 14.87%. Jalaun has a sex ratio of 865 females for every 1000 males, and a literacy rate of 75.16%. 24.79% of the population lives in urban areas. Scheduled Castes made up 27.70% of the population. The largest city in the district is Orai, followed by Konch.

Languages of Jalaun district (2011)
1. Hindi (96.6%)
2. Bundeli (2.01%)
3. Urdu (1.30%)
4. Others (0.05%)

At the time of the 2011 Census of India, 96.64% of the population in the district spoke Hindi, 2.01% Bundeli and 1.30% Urdu as their first language. Bundeli is the local dialect.

== Medical College ==
- Government Medical College, Jalaun is a government medical college located in Orai of Jalaun district.

== See also ==
- Jagmanpur, Kanar
