= Daryaoganj =

- Town
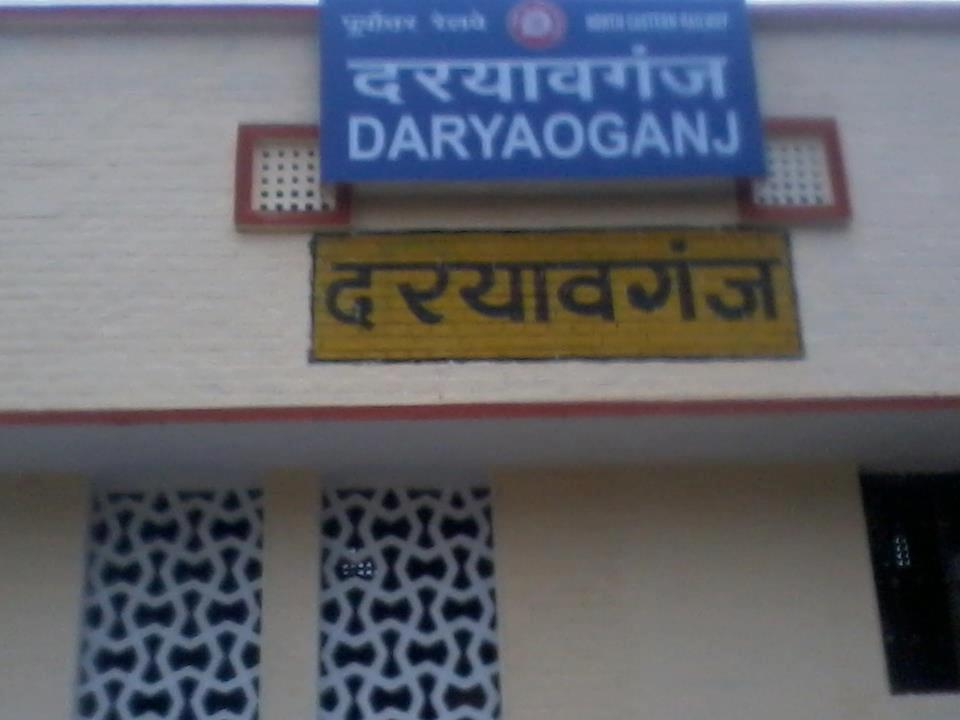
- Front Look of Railway Station of Daryaoganj (NER)

- Location in Uttar Pradesh, India
- Coordinates: 27°35′56″N 79°04′58″E
- Country: India
- State: Uttar Pradesh
- District: Kasganj

Population (2011)
  - Total: 700

Official Languages
  - Hindi: Hindi
- Time zone: UTC+5:30 (IST)
- PIN: 207244
- Telephone Code: 05740
- Vehicle registration: UP87

Daryaoganj is a town situated in Kasganj district of Uttar Pradesh state in India. Daryaoganj comes under the Majhola Gram Panchayat, its Vidhan Sabha Region & Block is Patiyali and the Lok Sabha Region is Etah. The Postal Index Number of Daryaoganj is 207244 and comes under Patiyali postal region. The holy river Ganga passes about 12 km away from this town.

== History ==
In the early 19th century, Daryaoganj came in existence. The first resident of this town was Lala Shri Kedar Nath Gupta with his three sons Shri Raghuveer Sahay Gupta, Shri Jeeva Ram Gupta and Shri Het Ram Gupta, and a daughter who was married to Shri Rajaram Gupta in Ganjdundwara. A Deshi Ghee Sweet Corner of Shri Kedar Nath was the first shop of this town.

This town was part of the kingdom of Awagarh's king.

According to ancient stories, at the time of Mahabharat, King Drupad (राजा द्रुपद) of Paanchal (पांचाल) state had donated a piece of his land to Guru Dronacharya (गुरू द्रॊणाचार्य). Daryaoganj is part of that donated land. Daryaoganj is the place where the great saint Markandeya lived ever, and the traces of his existence can be seen even today.

During the founding of Daryaoganj town, the location of Railway Station was the main factor which enhanced the importance of its locality. At present time, Daryaoganj is an emerging town as it is situated at main district highway from Soron to Saray Agahat via Sahawar, Ganjdundwara, Patiyali, Aliganj.

In its beginning, Daryaoganj was the part of district Etah but on 15 April 2008 another district was established by Sushri Mayawati former Chief Minister of Uttar Pradesh, first named Kanshi Ram Nagar but in 2012 renamed Kasganj by Shri Akhilesh Yadav.

== Transportation ==
Daryaoganj is well connected by railway and road network.

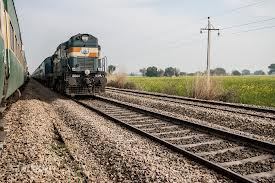
Daryaoganj Railway Track

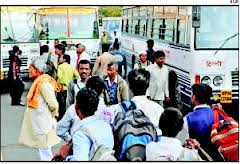
UPSRTC Bus Service in Daryaoganj

=== Rail ===
Daryaoganj is situated in between important railway track Kanpur (via Farrukhabad) to Mathura / Bareilly (via Kasganj) known as North Eastern Railway (NER) .Most of the local mail trains & all the passenger trains halt at Daryaoganj/(DRO) Railway Station.

=== Road ===
Daryaoganj is connected with the Grand Trunk Road at Etah & Kurawali via Jaithara. It is situated at main district highway from Soron to Saray Agahat. The bus service of UPSRTC directly to Delhi & Agra is provided in the town.
