= Bhargain =

- Nagar Panchayat
- Location in Uttar Pradesh, India
- Coordinates: 27°36′54″N 79°08′39″E
- Country: India
- State: Uttar Pradesh
- District: kasganj

Population (2011)
  - Total: 80,215

Languages
  - Official: Urdu, Hindi
- Time zone: UTC+5:30 (IST)
- Postal code: 207244
- Vehicle registration: UP87
- Website: www.bhargain.com

Bhargain is a town and a nagar panchayat in Kasganj District in the Indian state of Uttar Pradesh. It was established at bank of Ganga river, however the river is around 3 km far from the town now. Farming and bricks manufacturing is the main occupation of locals. A large number of people has been migrated to different part of country notably to Vadodara. Bhargain has a shrine of Sufi from Chishti Order. The shrine is located near to Bhargain and easily reachable from the town. An annual urs held at Dargah.

Maudood Chisti Bhargain.

There are few others notable shrines are present in Bhargain. Hundreds of people from near by places visits these shrines every year.

== History ==
There are not many evidence available about the earlier settlement of the town, however there is a general view among the locals that their ancestors settled here around 600–700 years ago.

Soldier memorial rock inscription from World war 1.

Many from the town had served in military before and after the independent, notably in army of Rani of Jhansi in 1857 revolution and 53 men from the town had fought bravely in World War I in different countries.

== Demographics ==
Bhargain nagar panchayat is divided into 14 wards for which elections are held every 5 years. The Bhargain Nagar Panchayat had population of 21,891 of which 11,222 are males while 10,669 are females as per report released by 2011 Census of India.

The population of children aged 0-6 is 3845 which is 17.56% of total population of Bhargain (NP). In Bhargain Nagar Panchayat, the female sex ratio is 951 against state average of 912. Moreover, the child sex ratio in Bhargain is around 850 compared to Uttar Pradesh state average of 902. The literacy rate of Bhargain city is 52.59% lower than state average of 67.68%. In Bhargain, male literacy is around 65.28% while the female literacy rate is 39.56%.

Bhargain Nagar Panchayat has total administration over 3,132 houses to which it supplies basic amenities like water and sewerage. It is also authorize to build roads within Nagar Panchayat limits and impose taxes on properties coming under its jurisdiction. It's been noted as one of the cleanest town in the state.

== Culture ==
=== Festivals ===
Eid is the main festival in town. People follows the Ganga-Jamuni tehzeeb and celebrate other festivals as well with enthusiasm.

== Transport ==
Bhargain is directly connected with cities by road. Ballupur is the nearest railway station.

== Politics ==
Bhargain is part of Patiyali (Assembly constituency) and Etah (Lok Sabha constituency). Nagar panchayat election held in every 5 years, Chaman khan is currently serving as chairman of nagar panchayat Bhargain.

Chairperson/Head of Bhargain
Name	Terms	Year
Rasheed Khan	One term	1993-1998
Ahmed Nafees Khan	Three terms	1998-2013
Abdullah Khan	One term	2013-2018
Jaitoon Bano	One term	2018-2023
Chaman khan	Currently	2023

== Occupation ==
The main occupation of people of town is agriculture. Mostly are self-employed. A large number of population has been migrated to Gujarat and involve in different kind of businesses.

Many people from the town are serving in Indian army.

Islam	94%
Hindu	6%
distribution of Religion

== Tourism ==
Bhargain is famous for shrine of Sufi from Chishti Order. The Shrine is located near to Bhargain and can be easily reachable from the town. An annual urs held at Dargah.

There are few others notable shrines are present in Bhargain. Hundreds of people from near by places visits these shrines every year.

== Education ==
There are 3 inter colleges and 2 degree colleges in town, addition to that many primary and secondary schools are currently running in town. Despite many schools and colleges, the literacy rate of the town is lower than the average literacy rate of the country, however there are many independent social organizations working to educate people about the importance of education. Bhargain Public School, run by Al- Yunish Educational Society, provides free education Primary to Class 8 to encourage education for all.

== Health ==
There is one primary health center and two sub-primary centers in the town of Bhargain but there is no emergency ward or delivery ward for pregnant women in this area. Basic health facilities are not available in the town of Bhargain

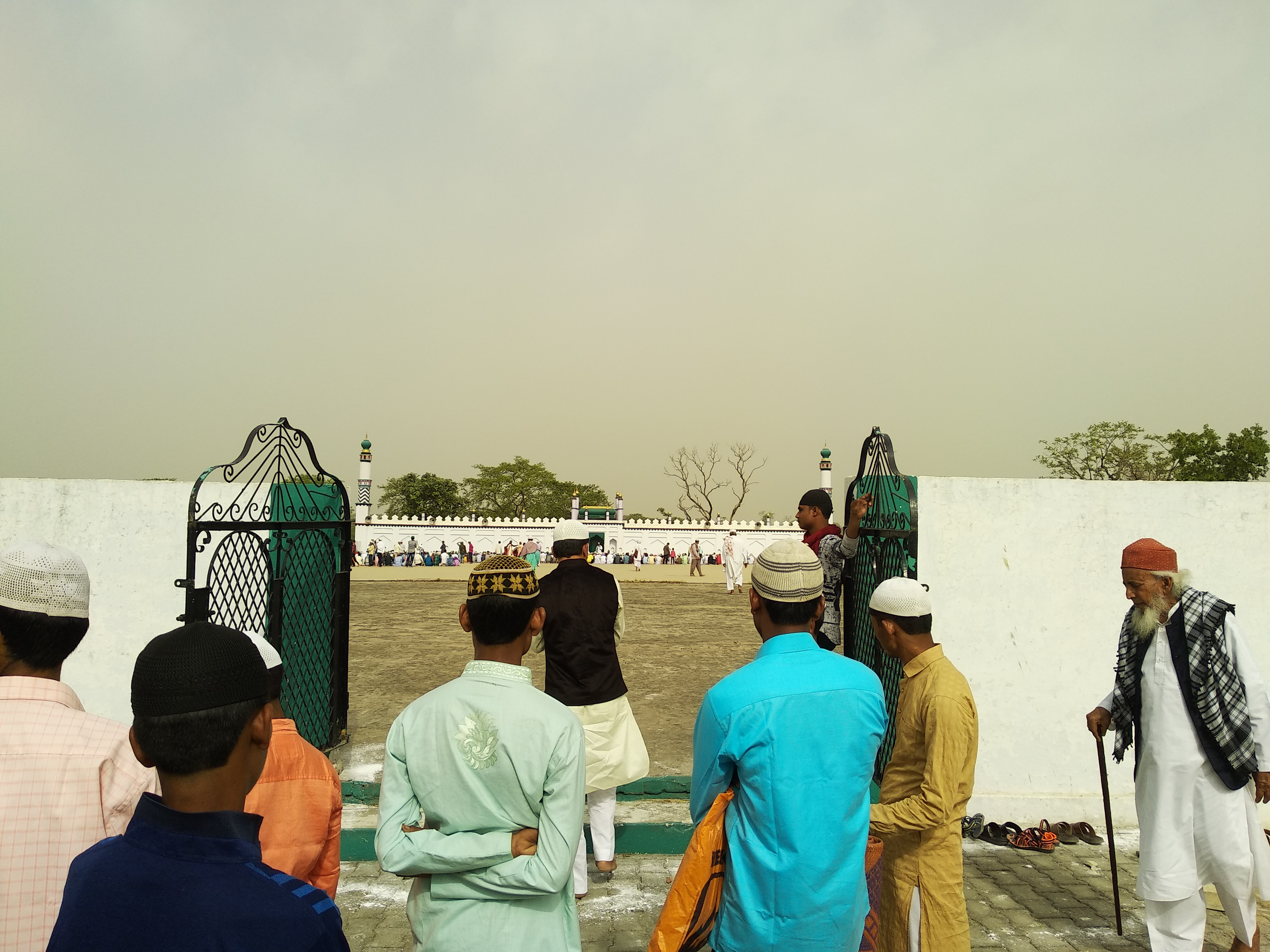
Eid namaz at Eidgah.

The modern equipped with oxygen facility Ambulance is gifted to Bhargain Town to transporting Patients to other city for Emergency Treatment by Al-Yunish FAMILY.

लगभग 70000 आबादी वाले कस्बा भरगैन में इमरजेंसी वार्ड और गर्भवती महिलाओं के लिए डिलीवरी वार्ड कि सुविधा उपलब्ध नहीं है जिसके कारण महिलाएं गुजरात और दूर दराज इलाकों में चिकित्सा सुविधाओं के लिए जाती हैं|

https://x.com/MohammadShoabK/status/1881959064722456900?t=Cg-t2oe7cMyZXxBk_Vm1xA&s=19
