= Nadira Sultan =

Indian politician

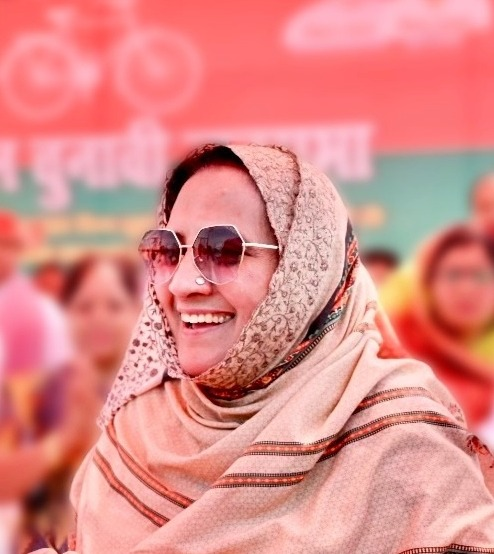

Member of the Uttar Pradesh legislative assembly
- Incumbent
- Assumed office 2022
- Preceded by: Mamtesh Shakya
- Constituency: Patiyali

Personal details
- Born: 11 November 1956 (age 69) Sahawar (Kasganj district)
- Party: Samajwadi Party
- Spouse: Dr Abdul Hafeez Khan
- Relations: Mohammad Azam Khan (Uncle in Law); Mohammad Zamir Khan (Uncle); Ahmad Loot Khan (Maternal Uncle)
- Children: Abdul Saleem Khan (Son); Tooba Khan (Daughter)
- Parent(s): Mushir Ahmad Khan (Father); Saad Fatima Khan (Mother)
- Profession: Politician, Farmer

Nadira Sultan is an Indian politician. She was elected to Patiyali in the 2022 Uttar Pradesh Legislative Assembly election as a member of the Samajwadi Party.

== Personal life ==
Nadira Sultan was born in Sahawar Town on 11 November and is daughter of politician and freedom fighter Late Mushir Ahmad Khan and Late Saad Fatima Khan. Her father was twice MP from Etha and Kasganj. Her uncle Late Mohammad Zamir Khan was MLA and her maternal uncle Late Ahmed Loot Khan was Minister in Uttar Pradesh. She was married to Dr Abdul Hafeez Khan from Rampur whose uncle is ex Minister Mohammad Azam Khan.

== Political career ==
In the 2022 Uttar Pradesh Legislative Assembly election, Nadira Sultan represented Samajwadi Party as a candidate from Patiyali and went on to defeat three times sitting MLA of Bharatiya Janata Party's Mamtesh Shakya. On 27 December 2022, she was awarded the membership of "Joint Committee for Women and Child Development" in Uttar Pradesh. She was awarded membership of "Joint Committee for Women and Child Development" in Uttar Pradesh for the second time for the year 2024.
