= Kasganj City railway station =

Railway station in Uttar Pradesh, India

General information
- Location: State Highway 33, Kasganj, Uttar Pradesh; India
- Coordinates: 27.8294°N 78.6772°E
- Elevation: 173 metres (568 ft)
- System: Indian Railways station
- Owner: Indian Railways
- Operator: North Eastern Railway
- Platforms: 2
- Tracks: 5
- Connections: Auto stand

Construction
- Structure type: Standard (on-ground station)
- Parking: No
- Cycle facilities: No

Other information
- Status: Single electric line
- Station code: KJC
- Zone(s): North Eastern Railway
- Division(s): Izzatnagar
Location
- Location within India Location within Uttar Pradesh

Kasganj City railway station is a small railway station in Kasganj district, Uttar Pradesh. Its station code is KJC. It serves Kasganj city. The station consists of two platforms.
