= Dholna =

Dholna is a village near Kasganj in Kanshi Ram Nagar district of Uttar Pradesh state of India.
