= Kudhar =

- Village
- Kudhar
- Location in Uttar Pradesh, India Kudhar (India)
- Coordinates: 27.9083669°N 78.5472952°E
- Country: India
- State: Uttar Pradesh
- District: Kasganj district

Government
  - Type: Panchayati raj (India)
  - Body: Gram panchayat

Population (2011 census)
  - Total: 3,730

Languages
  - Official: Hindi
- Time zone: UTC+5:30 (IST)
- Pin code: 207124
- Telephone code: 05744

Kudhar is a large village situated in the Kasganj district (Formerly Kasganj Tehsil of Kanshiram Nagar district) of Uttar Pradesh, India. According to Population Census 2011, Kudhar village is home to 619 families with a total population of 3730 of which 2032 are males while 1698 are females.

Kudhar has a literacy rate of 53.49%, lower than the Uttar Pradesh average literacy rate of 67.68%: male literacy is 70.25% and female literacy is 32.59%.

Agriculture is the main occupation of villagers.

== Transport ==
Kudhar is well linked to other parts of the district by means of both public and private Buses, and Jeep transport. The nearest railway station is Kasganj Junction which is 17.5 km away. The closest airport is Kheria Airport situated in Agra(100 km Approx.)

== Education ==
There is a Primary government school in Kudhar & higher secondary school named Nawabpur Inter College in the next village Nawabpur.
