= Nagla Bairu =

Village in Uttar Pradesh, India

Coordinates: 27°29′N 78°06′E

Nagla Bairu is a small village of Tehsil Patiyali in Kanshiram Nagar district of Uttar Pradesh in the northern part of India. It is situated near the Daryavganj Railway Station in the north eastern railway zone. There are all castes living in this village except Yadav. This village is totally dependent on agriculture. The village has been roundly covered with different trees. In the evening many birds from different parts of the country can be seen. Agriculture is the main source of the economy. There are some crops cultivated like lahsan, tobacco, peppermint, makka, wheat, sweet potato.
