= Bilram =

- Town
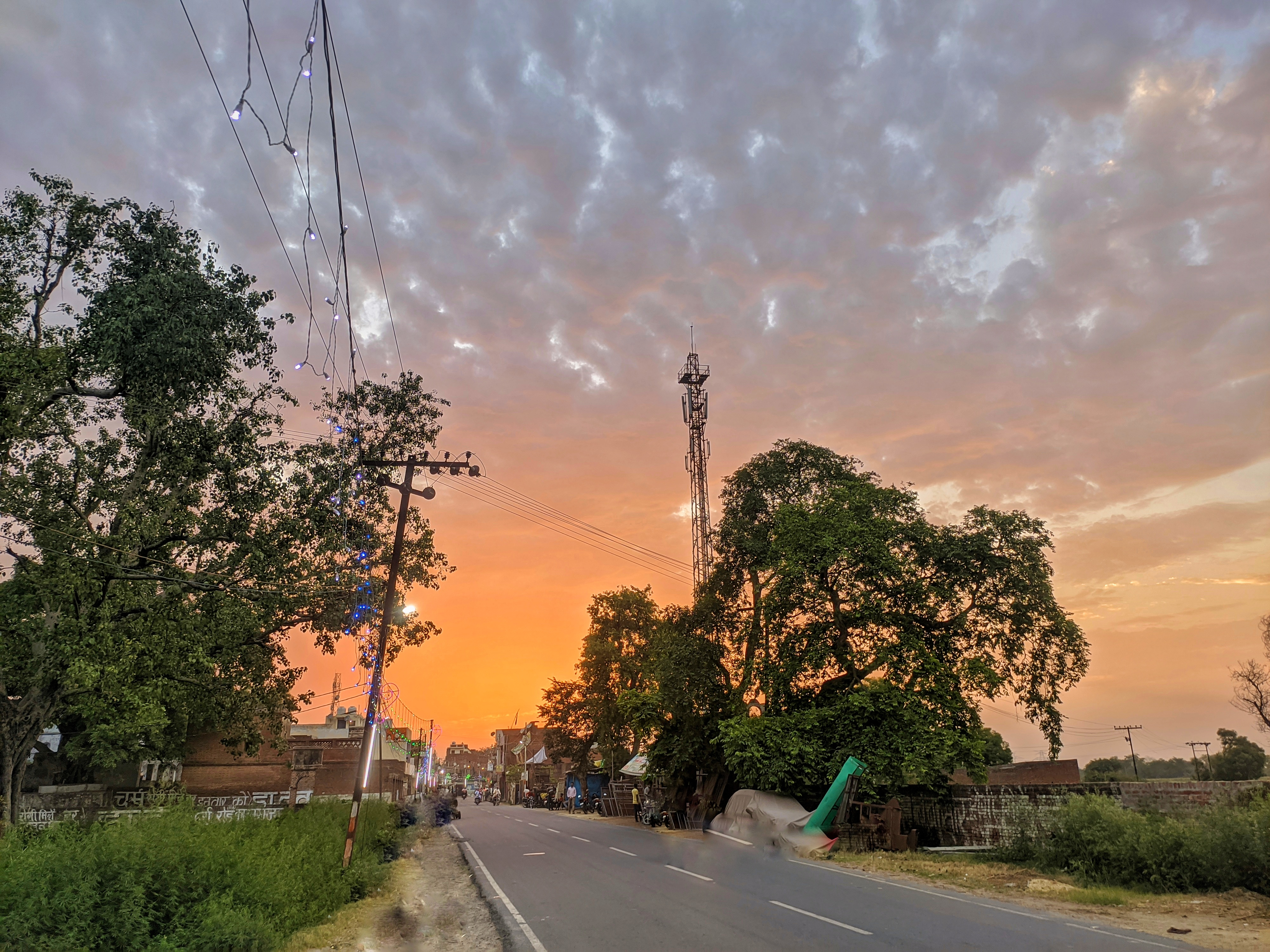
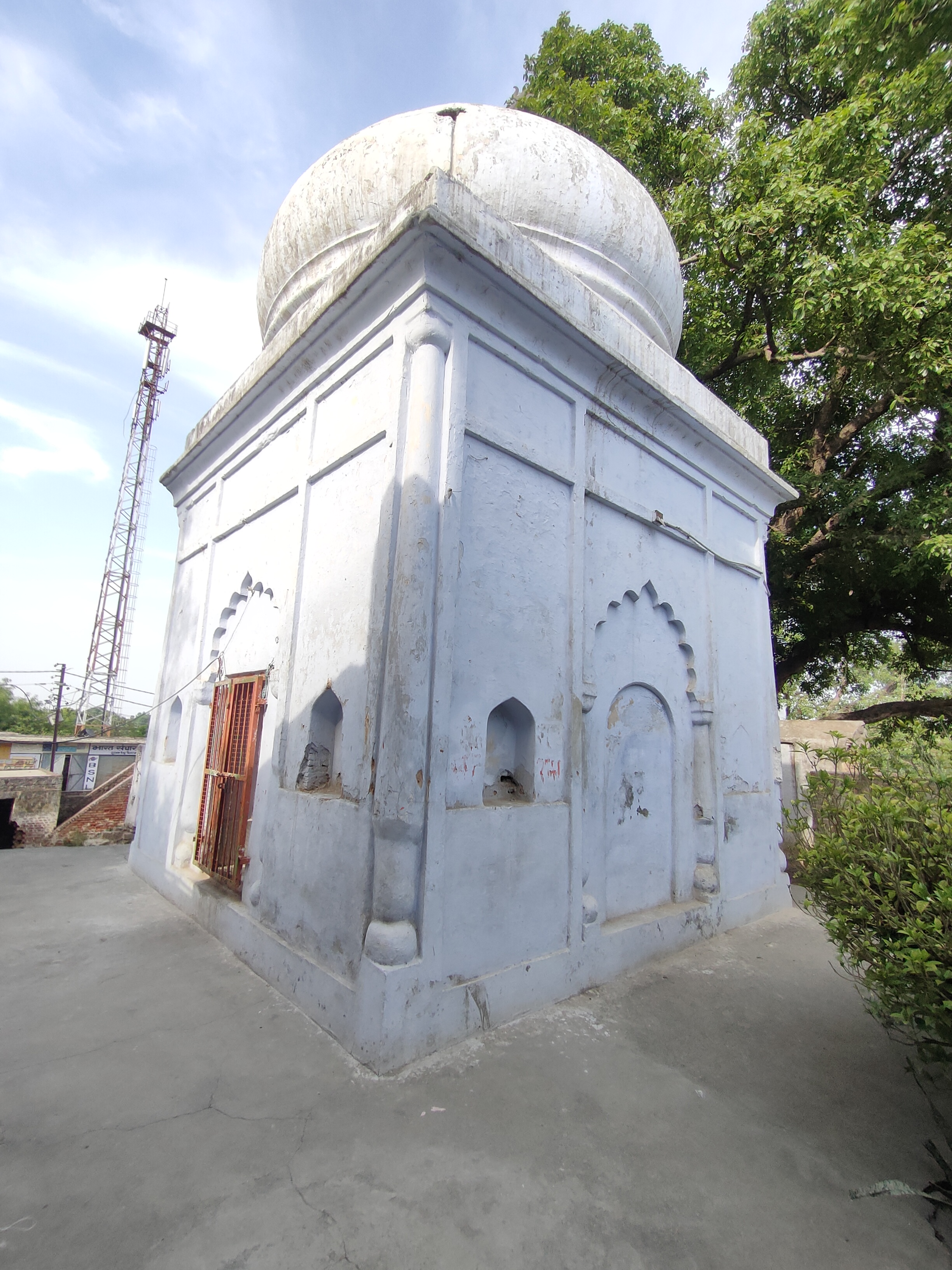
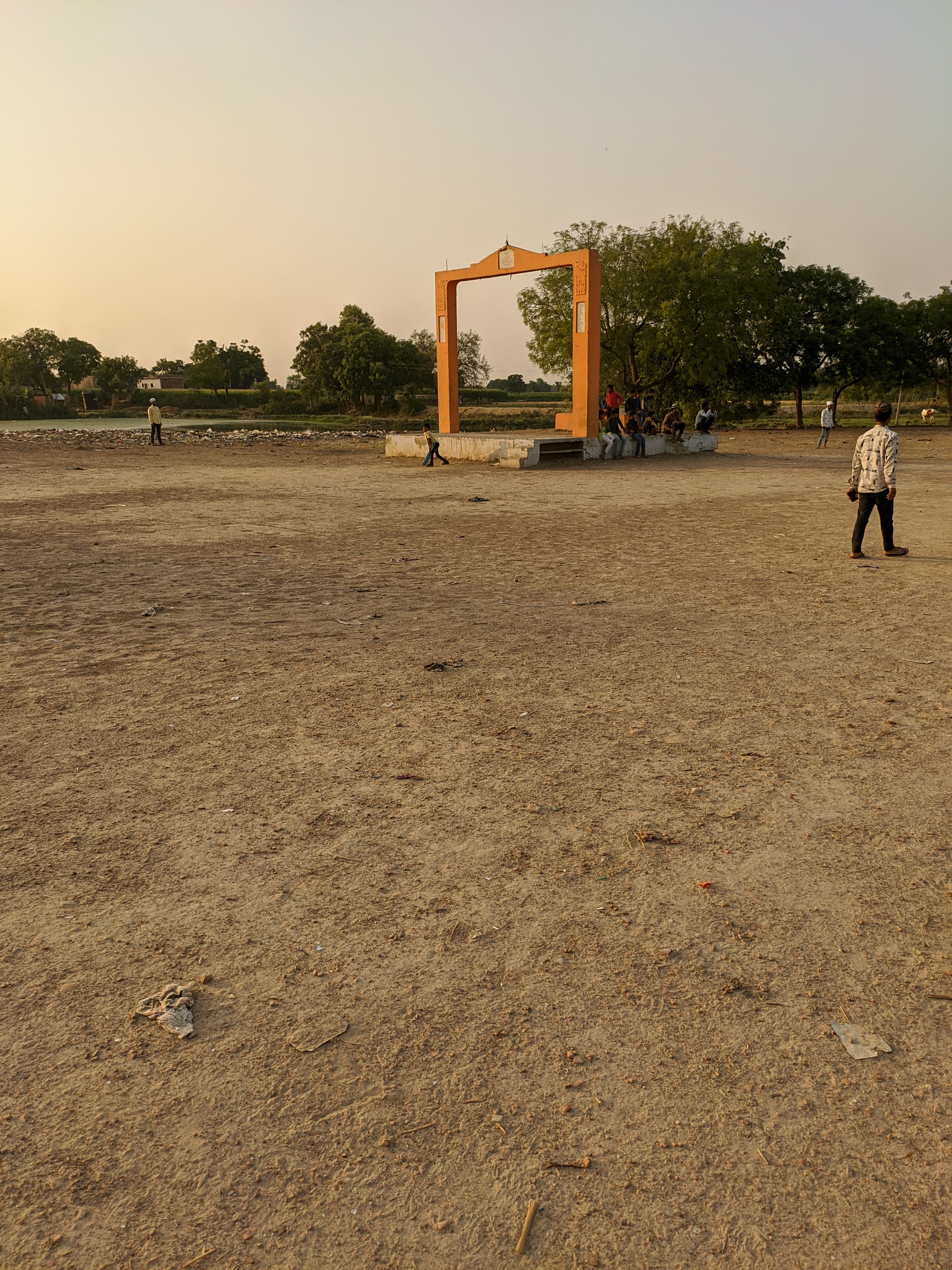
- From top: 1.Sunset View in Bilram, 2.Prachin Shiv Mandir, 3.Ramlila Ground.

- Location in Uttar Pradesh, India Bilram (India)
- Coordinates: 27°49′18″N 78°35′00″E
- Country: India
- State: Uttar Pradesh
- District: Kasganj

Government
  - Body: Government of India

Area
  - Total: 6.7 km^{2} (2.6 sq mi)

Population (2019)
  - Total: 25,232
  - Density: 3,800/km^{2} (9,800/sq mi)

Languages
  - Official: Hindi
- Time zone: UTC+5:30 (IST)
- Postal code: 207124
- Vehicle registration: UP87
- Website: up.gov.in

Bilram is a town and a Nagar Panchayat in Kasganj district in the state of Uttar Pradesh, India.

== Demographics ==
As of the 2001 Census of India, Bilram had a population of 12,119. Males constitute 54% of the population and females 46%. Bilram has an average literacy rate of 29%, lower than the national average of 59.5%; with male literacy of 37% and female literacy of 20%. 18% of the population is under 6 years of age.
