= Najeeva Khan Zeenat =

Indian politician

Najeeba Khan Zeenat

MLA, 16th Legislative Assembly
- In office Mar 2012 – Mar 2017
- Preceded by: Ajay Yadav
- Constituency: Patiyali

Personal details
- Born: 10 January 1962 (age 64) Kasganj district
- Party: Samajwadi Party
- Children: Nashi Khan (1 daughter)
- Parent: Hashmat Ullah Khan (father)
- Profession: Farmer & politician

Najeeba Khan Zeenat is an Indian politician and a member of the Sixteenth Legislative Assembly of Uttar Pradesh in India. She represented the Patiyali constituency of Uttar Pradesh and is a member of the Samajwadi Party.

== Early life and education ==
Najeeva Khan Zeenat was born in Kasganj district. She holds a Bachelor's degree (alma mater not known).

== Political career ==
Najeeva Khan Zeenat has been a MLA for one term. She represented the Patiyali constituency and is a member of the Samajwadi Party political party.

== Posts held ==
#	From	To	Position	Comments
01	2012	2017	Member, 16th Legislative Assembly	

== See also ==
- Patiyali (Assembly constituency)
- Sixteenth Legislative Assembly of Uttar Pradesh
- Uttar Pradesh Legislative Assembly
