= Mamtesh Shakya =

Indian politician

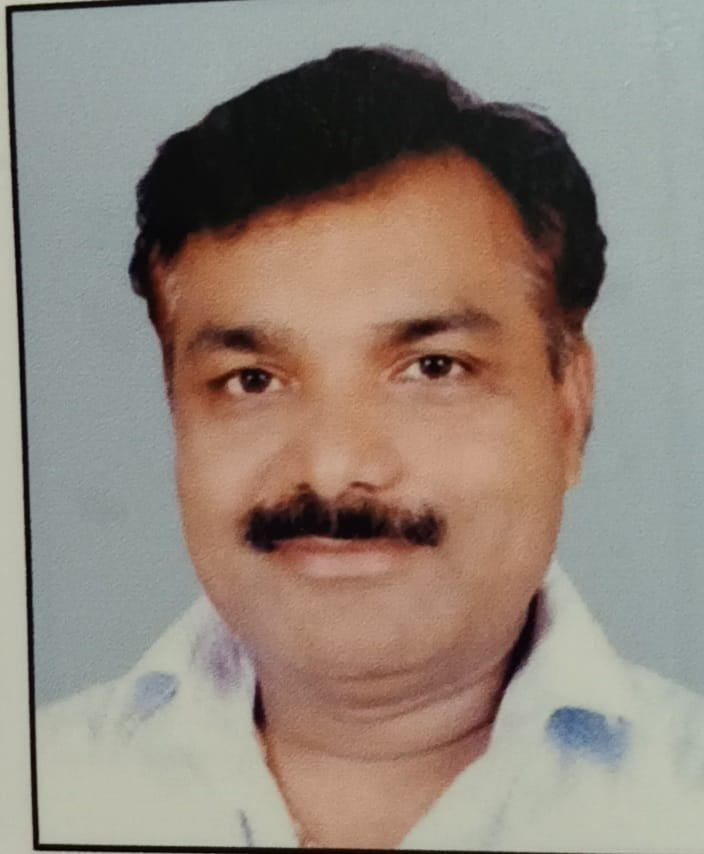

MLA, 17th Legislative Assembly
- In office 2017–2022
- Preceded by: Najeeva Khan Zeenat
- Succeeded by: Nadira Sultan
- Constituency: Patiyali (Assembly constituency)

MLA, 15th Legislative Assembly
- In office May 2007 – Mar 2012
- Preceded by: Devendra Pratap
- Succeeded by: Satyaveer Munna
- Constituency: Soron

Personal details
- Born: 1 July 1972 (age 54) Etah district
- Party: Bharatiya Janta Party
- Spouse: Sangeeta Shakya (wife)
- Children: Ekansh shakya
- Parent: Suresh Chandra Shakya (father) dhanwanti shakya (Mother)
- Education: M.U. Degree College
- Profession: Farmer & politician

Mamtesh Shakya is an Indian politician and a member of the Seventeenth Legislative Assembly of Uttar Pradesh in India. He represented the Patiyali constituency of Uttar Pradesh and is a member of the Bhartiya Janta Party political party.

== Early life and education ==
Mamtesh Shakya was born in Etah district. He attended the M.U. Degree College and attained a Bachelor's degree.

== Political career ==
Mamtesh Shakya has served as an MLA for three terms.He represented the Patiyali constituency from 2017 to 2022 and is a member of the Bhartiya Janta Party political party. He also represented the Amanpur constituency during 2007–2017.

== Posts held ==
#	From	To	Position	Comments
01	2017	2022	Member, 17th Legislative Assembly	
01	2012	2017	Member, 16th Legislative Assembly	
02	2007	2012	Member, 15th Legislative Assembly	

== See also ==
- Amanpur (Assembly constituency)
- Sixteenth Legislative Assembly of Uttar Pradesh
- Uttar Pradesh Legislative Assembly
