= Patiyali =

- Town
- Location in Uttar Pradesh, India
- Coordinates: 27°43′N 79°01′E
- Country: India
- State: Uttar Pradesh
- District: Kasganj

Area
  - Total: 7.71 km^{2} (2.98 sq mi)

Population (2011)
  - Total: 14,366
  - Density: 1,860/km^{2} (4,830/sq mi)

Languages
  - Official: Hindi, Urdu
- Time zone: UTC+5:30 (IST)
- Postal code: 207243
- Vehicle registration: UP-87

Patiyali is a town and a nagar panchayat in Kasganj District in the Indian state of Uttar Pradesh. It is located on the banks of River Ganga. It is the birthplace of Amir Khusrau (1253-1325 CE). Patiyali is a constituency of District Kasganj. Member of Legislative Assembly from Patiyali is Nadira Sultan of Samajwadi Party. About hundred years ago the river Ganges flowed thorough Patiyali Quila. Patiyali Quila is a Quila of Raja Durpad from Mahabharat time. Nowadays it is 10 km away at Qadarganj. Dariyaganj lake of Patiyali covers an area of about 50 hectares. On the occasion of Kakode ka Mela thousands of people assemble at Kaderganj Ghat.

== History ==
Patiyali was listed in the Ain-i Akbari (c. 1595) as a mahal under sarkar Kannauj. It was listed with an assessed revenue of 1,877,600 dams and was expected to supply 2,000 infantry and 100 cavalry to the Mughal army.

== Demographics ==
As of 2011 India census, Patiyali had a population of 5,60,320. Males constitute 53% of the population and females 47%. Patiyali has an average literacy rate of 73%, higher than the national average of 59.5%: male literacy is 83%, and female literacy is 67%. In Patiyali, 18% of the population is under 6 years of age. Patyali is a town laid to on Mathura- Kanpur train track via Kasganj.

== Temples ==
Shiv Temple, Station Road Patiyali Shiv Temple (Patali Mahadev)

Shiv Temple made by Late. Shri Jhandamal Ji Varshney

== Poets ==
Amir Khusrau

== Locality ==
Nearest villages to Patiyali are Badola, Rampura, Nagla Madan, Nagla Dalu Narthar and Nagla Bairu, Rijola Raja, Sarawal, Abdal Nagla, Rani Damar, Jatpura, Nardoli
