= Nagla Dalu =

Nagla Dalu is a small village of Tehsil Patiyali in Kanshi Ram Nagar district of Uttar Pradesh in the northern part of India. It is situated near the Narthar Railway Station in the north eastern railway zone. Thakur is the main caste of the village. The village is dependent on agriculture. Nagla Dalu is surrounded by many different trees.
