= Meena Maheshwari =

Indian politician

Meena maheshwari

Chairperson of Kasganj
- Incumbent
- Assumed office 13 May 2023
- Preceded by: Rajni Sahu

Personal details
- Born: 14 February 1978 (age 47)
- Political party: Bharatiya Janata Party

Meena Maheshwari is a politician from Kasganj, Uttar Pradesh.

She was elected chairperson on 13 May 2023. In the 2023 local elections, she defeated her nearest rival Rajni Sahu of the BJP.
