= Patiyali Assembly constituency =

Constituency of the Uttar Pradesh legislative assembly in India

Patiyali
- Constituency No. 102 for the Uttar Pradesh Legislative Assembly

Constituency details
- Country: India
- Region: North India
- State: Uttar Pradesh
- District: Kasganj
- Total electors: 306,382 (2012)
- Reservation: None

Member of Legislative Assembly
- 18th Uttar Pradesh Legislative Assembly
- Incumbent Nadira Sultan
- Party: Samajwadi Party

Patiyali Assembly constituency is one of the 403 constituencies of the Uttar Pradesh Legislative Assembly, India. It is a part of the Kasganj district. Patiyali Assembly constituency comes under Etah Lok Sabha constituency. First election in this assembly constituency was held in 1969 after the delimitation order was passed in 1967. After the "Delimitation of Parliamentary and Assembly Constituencies Order" was passed in 2008, the constituency was assigned identification number 102.

== Wards / Areas ==
Extent of Patiyali Assembly constituency is KCs Ganjdundwara, Patiyali, Dariyavganj, PCs Samothee, Bhujpura, Sidhapura, Kaliyanee, Sarabal, Ajeet Nagar, Sailot, Hamirpur, Utarana, Jasmai, Viloutee of Sidhapura KC, Sidhpura NP, Patiyali NP, Bhargain NP & Ganjdundwara MB of Patiyali Tehsil.

== Members of the Legislative Assembly ==
#	Term	Name	Party	From	To	Days	Comments	Ref
01	05th Vidhan Sabha	Chaudhary Tirmal Singh Yadav	Bharatiya Kranti Dal	Feb-1969	Mar-1974	1,832	-	
02	06th Vidhan Sabha	Malik Mohammad Zamir Khan	Indian National Congress	Mar-1974	Apr-1977	1,153	-	
03	07th Vidhan Sabha	Chaudhary Jasvir Singh	Janata Party	Jun-1977	Feb-1980	969	-	
04	08th Vidhan Sabha	Malik Mohammad Zamir Khan	Indian National Congress (I)	Jun-1980	Mar-1985	1,735	-	
05	09th Vidhan Sabha	Rajindra Singh	Indian National Congress	Mar-1985	Nov-1989	1,725	-	
06	10th Vidhan Sabha	Devender Singh	Indian National Congress	Dec-1989	Apr-1991	488	-	
07	11th Vidhan Sabha	Rajindra Singh	Bharatiya Janata Party	Jun-1991	Dec-1992	533	-	
08	12th Vidhan Sabha	Sajjan Pal Singh	Bharatiya Janata Party	Dec-1993	Oct-1995	693	-	
09	13th Vidhan Sabha	Kunwar Davendra Singh Yadav	Samajwadi Party	Oct-1996	May-2002	1,967	-	
10	14th Vidhan Sabha	Rajendra Singh Chauhan	Bahujan Samaj Party	Feb-2002	May-2007	1,902	-	
11	15th Vidhan Sabha	Ajay Yadav	Bahujan Samaj Party	May-2007	Mar-2012	1,762	-	
12	16th Vidhan Sabha	Najeeba Khan Zeenat	Samajwadi Party	Mar-2012	March-2017	-	-	
13	17th Vidhan Sabha	Mamtesh Shakya	Bharatiya Janata Party	Mar-2017	Mar-2022	-	-	
14	18th Vidhan Sabha	Nadira Sultan	Samajwadi Party	Mar-2022	Incumbent	-		

== Election results ==
=== 2027 ===
2027 Uttar Pradesh Legislative Assembly election: Patiyali
Party	Candidate	Votes	%	±%
INDIA				
NDA				
BSP				
NOTA	None of the above			
Majority				
Turnout				
gain from		Swing		

=== 2022 ===
2022 Uttar Pradesh Legislative Assembly election: Patiyali
Party	Candidate	Votes	%	±%
SP	Nadira Sultan	91,958	41.88	+8.04
BJP	Mamtesh Shakya	87,957	40.06	+4.36
BSP	Neeraj Mishra	30,626	13.95	−7.81
Jan Adhikar Party	Vivek Kumar	2,225	1.01	
NOTA	None of the above	839	0.38	−0.39
Majority		4,001	1.82	−0.04
Turnout		219,549	61.11	−0.71
SP gain from BJP		Swing		

=== 2017 ===
Mamtesh Shakya of BJP, Dheerendra Bahadur Singh of BSP and Kiran Yadav of SP were the major contestants among the 11 contestants of 2017 Assembly Election.

2017 Uttar Pradesh Legislative Assembly Election: Patiyal
Party	Candidate	Votes	%	±%
BJP	Mamtesh Shakya	72,414	35.7	
SP	Kiran Yadav	68,643	33.84	
BSP	Dheerendra Bahadur Singh	44,131	21.76	
MD	Shyam Sundar	10,586	5.22	
NOTA	None of the above	1,556	0.77	
Majority		3,771	1.86	
Turnout		202,823	61.82	

=== 2012 ===
Najeeva Khan Zeenat of Samajwadi Party won the seat by defeating Suraj Singh Shakya from Bahujan Samaj Party with a margin of 27,775 votes.

== See also ==
- Etah district
- Etah Lok Sabha constituency
- Sixteenth Legislative Assembly of Uttar Pradesh
- Uttar Pradesh Legislative Assembly
- Vidhan Bhawan
