= Sahawar =

- Town
- Location in Uttar Pradesh, India
- Coordinates: 27.8°N 78.85°E
- Country: India
- State: Uttar Pradesh
- District: Kasganj

Government
  - Type: Nagar Panchayat
- Elevation: 176 m (577 ft)

Population (2011)
  - Total: 24,457

Languages
  - Official: Hindi
- Time zone: UTC+5:30 (IST)
- PIN: 207245
- Telephone code: 05744
- Vehicle registration: UP- 87

Sahawar is a town and a nagar panchayat, as well as Tehsil in Kasganj district in the Indian State of Uttar Pradesh. Previously, it was part of district Etah. Ms. Nashi Khan D/o Mrs. Najeeba Khan Zeenat (Ex MLA Patiyali Constituency ) is the present chairperson of Sahawar Town. The Block Sahawar was established in 01/04/1958.

== Geography ==
Sahawar is located at 27.8°N 78.85°E. It has an average elevation of 176 metres (577 feet). Sahawar is a co-community town. Sahawar, Surround s 100 km away from the cities Bareilly, Mathura, Agra, Aligarh, Mainpuri and almost 250 km From National Capital New Delhi & State Capital Lucknow. It is 12 km away from Soron and 20 km from Mahabharata State Patiyali.

== Demographics ==
As of 2011 India census, Sahawar had a population of 24,457. Males constitute 53% of the population and females 47%. Sahawar has an average literacy rate of 66%, lower than the national average of 59.5%: male literacy is 42%, and female literacy is 28%. In Sahawar, 19% of the population is under 6 years of age.
