= Amir Khusrau =

Indian poet, writer, singer and scholar (1253–1325)

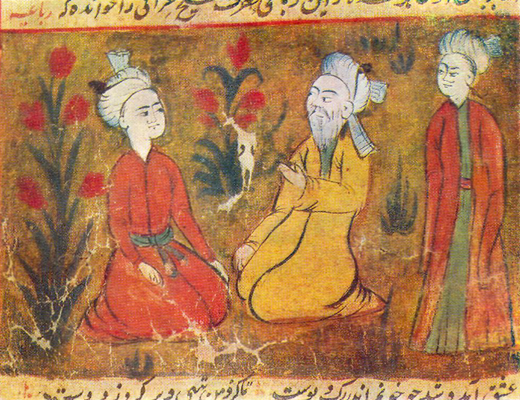
- Amir Khusrow teaching his disciples in a miniature from a manuscript of Majlis al-Ushaq by Sultan Husayn Bayqara

Background information
- Born: Ab'ul Hasan Yamīn ud-Dīn K͟husrau; 1253; Patiyali, Delhi Sultanate (now in Kasganj district, Uttar Pradesh, India)
- Died: October 1325 (aged 71–72) Delhi, Delhi Sultanate (now in Delhi, India)
- Genres: Ghazal; Qawwali; Ruba'i; Tarana
- Occupations: Sufi; singer; poet; composer; author; scholar
- Arabic name
- Personal (Ism): Khusraw خسرو
- Patronymic (Nasab): ibn Maḥmūd ابن محمود
- Teknonymic (Kunya): Abū al-Ḥasan أبو الحسن
- Epithet (Laqab): Yamīn al-Dīn يامين الدين
- Toponymic (Nisba): al-Dehlawī الدهلوي

Urdu literature اردو ادب
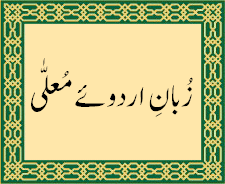

Urdu literature
- By category Urdu language Rekhta

Major figures
- Amir Khusrau - Wali Dakhani - Mir Taqi Mir - Ghalib - Abdul Haq - Muhammad Iqbal

Urdu writers
- Writers – Novelists – Poets

Forms
- Ghazal - Dastangoi - Nazm – Fiction

Institutions
- Anjuman-i Taraqqi-i Urdu; Urdu movement Literary Prizes

Abu'l Hasan Yamīn ud-Dīn Khusrau (1253 – October 1325), better known as Amīr Khusrau, sometimes spelled as Amir Khusrow or Amir Khusro, was an Indo-Persian Sufi singer, musician, court poet and scholar, who lived during the period of the Delhi Sultanate.

He is a figure in the cultural history of the Indian subcontinent. He was a mystic and a spiritual disciple of Nizamuddin Auliya of Delhi, India. He wrote poetry primarily in Persian, but also in Hindavi and Punjabi. A vocabulary in verse, the Ḳhāliq Bārī, containing Arabic, Persian and Hindavi terms is often attributed to him. Khusrau is sometimes referred to as the "voice of India" or "Parrot of India" (Tuti-e-Hind).

Khusrau is regarded as the "father of qawwali" (a devotional form of singing of the Sufis in the Indian subcontinent), and introduced the ghazal style of song into India, both of which still exist widely in India and Pakistan. Khusrau was an expert in many styles of Persian poetry which were developed in medieval Persia, from Khāqānī's qasidas to Nizami's khamsa. He used 11 metrical schemes with 35 distinct divisions. He wrote in many verse forms including ghazal, masnavi, qata, rubai, do-baiti and tarkib-band. His contribution to the development of the ghazal was significant.

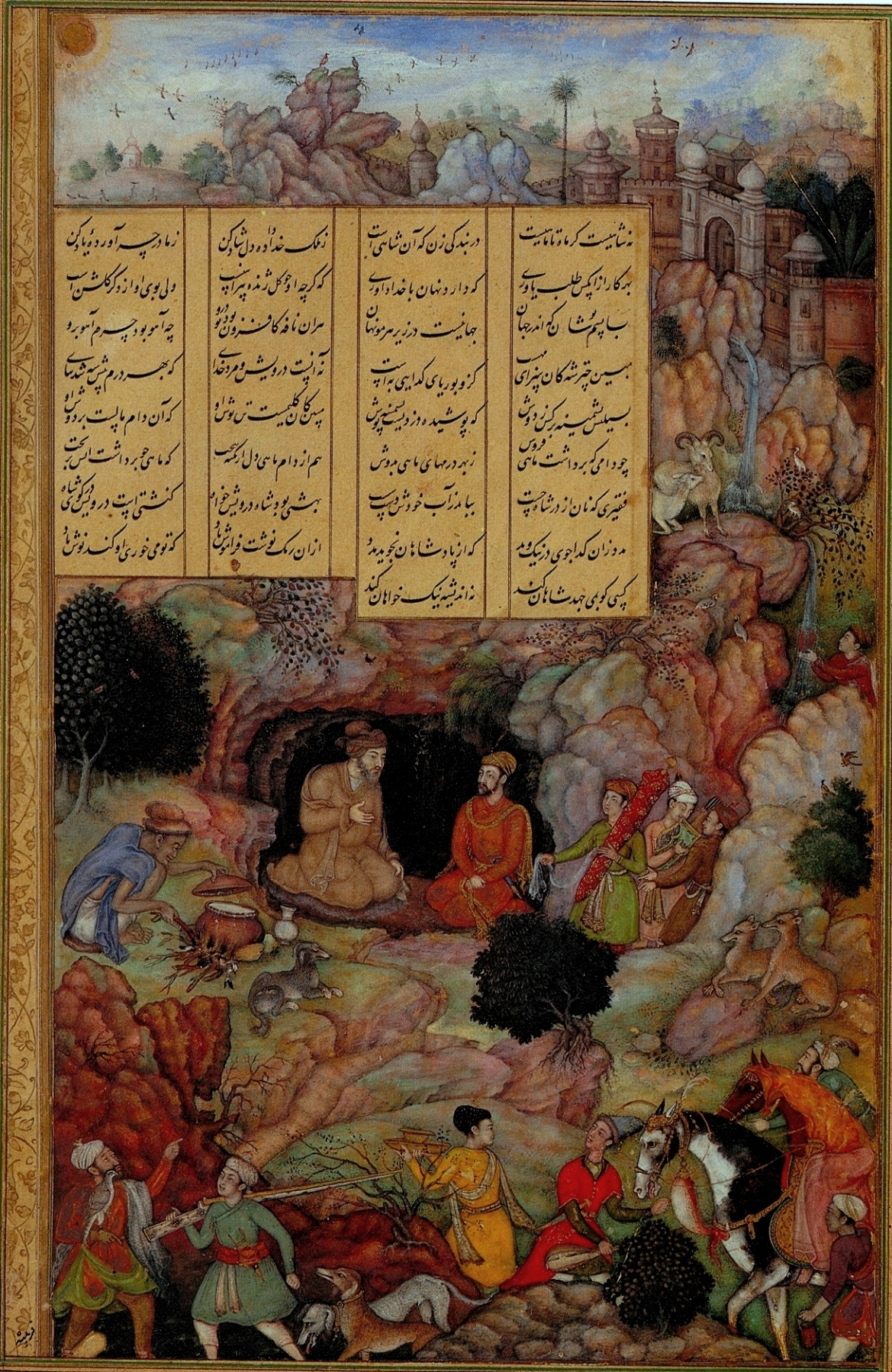
Alexander Visits the Sage Plato, from the Khamsa of Amir Khusrau

== Family background ==
Amīr Khusrau was born in 1253 in Patiyali, Kasganj district, in modern-day Uttar Pradesh, India, in what was then the Delhi Sultanate, the son of Amīr Saif ud-Dīn Mahmūd (d. 658/1260), a Turkic officer, and Bibi Daulat Naz, a native Indian mother.

His father Amir Saif ud-Din Mahmud was a member of the Turkic clan of Transoxiana and arrived in India during the rule of Shams al-Din Iltutmish of the Mamluk dynasty. Amir Saif ud-Din Mahmud was a Sunni Muslim. He grew up in Kesh, a small town near Samarkand in what is now Uzbekistan. When he was a young man, the region was destroyed and ravaged by Genghis Khan's invasion of Central Asia, and much of the population fled to other lands, India being a favored destination. A group of families, including that of Amir Saif ud-Din, left Kesh and travelled to Balkh (now in northern Afghanistan), which was a relatively safe place; from there, they sent representatives to the Sultan of distant Delhi seeking refuge. This was granted, and the group then travelled to Delhi. Sultan Shams ud-Din Iltutmish, ruler of Delhi, was also Turkic like them; indeed, he had grown up in the same region of Central Asia and had undergone somewhat similar circumstances in earlier life. This was the reason the group had turned to him in the first place. Iltutmish not only welcomed the refugees to his court but also granted high offices and landed estates to some of them. In 1230, Amir Saif ud-Din was granted a fief in the district of Patiyali.

Amir Saif ud-Din married Bibi Daulat Naz, the daughter of Rawat Arz, an Indian noble converted to Islam, and war minister of Ghiyas ud-Din Balban, the ninth Sultan of Delhi.

== Early years ==
Amir Saif ud-Din and Bibi Daulatnaz became the parents of four children: three sons (one of whom was Khusrau) and a daughter. Amir Saif ud-Din Mahmud died in 1260, when Khusrau was only eight years old. Through his father's influence, he imbibed Islam and Sufism coupled with proficiency in Turkish, Persian, and Arabic languages. He was known by his sobriquet Tuti-i Hind ("Parrot of India"), which according to the Encyclopaedia of Islam "compares the eloquent poet to the sweet-talking parrot, indicates his canonical status as a poet of Persian." Khusrau's love and admiration for his motherland is transparent through his work. Amīr Khusrau was also called "God's Turk" by his teacher Nizamuddin Auliya.

Khusrau was an intelligent child. He started learning and writing poetry at the age of nine. His first divan,Tuhfat us-Sighr (The Gift of Childhood), containing poems composed between the ages of 16 and 18, was compiled in 1271. In 1273, when Khusrau was 20 years old, his grandfather, who was reportedly 113 years old, died.

== Career ==
After Khusrau's grandfather's death, Khusrau joined the army of Malik Chajju, a nephew of the reigning Sultan, Ghiyas ud-Din Balban. This brought his poetry to the attention of the Assembly of the Royal Court where he was honoured.

Nasir ud-Din Bughra Khan, the second son of Balban, was invited to listen to Khusrau. He was impressed and became Khusrau's patron in 1276. In 1277 Bughra Khan was then appointed ruler of Bengal, and Khusrau visited him in 1279 while writing his second divan, Wast ul-Hayat (The Middle of Life). Khusrau then returned to Delhi. Balban's eldest son, Khan Muhammad (who was in Multan), arrived in Delhi, and when he heard about Khusrau, he invited him to his court. Khusrau then accompanied him to Multan in 1281. Multan at the time was the gateway to India and was a center of knowledge and learning. Caravans of scholars, tradesmen and emissaries transited through Multan from Baghdad, Arabia and Persia on their way to Delhi. Khusrau wrote that:

I tied the belt of service on my waist and put on the cap of companionship for another five years. I imparted lustre to the water of Multan from the ocean of my wits and pleasantries.

On 9 March 1285, Khan Muhammad was killed in battle while fighting Mongols who were invading the Sultanate. Khusrau wrote two elegies in grief of his death. In 1287, Khusrau travelled to Awadh with another of his patrons, Amir Ali Hatim. At the age of eighty, Balban called his second son Bughra Khan back from Bengal, but Bughra Khan refused. After Balban's death in 1287, his grandson Muiz ud-Din Qaiqabad, Bughra Khan's son, was made the Sultan of Delhi at the age of 17. Khusrau remained in Qaiqabad's service for two years, from 1287 to 1288. In 1288, Khusrau finished his first masnavi, Qiran us-Sa'dain (Meeting of the Two Auspicious Stars), which was about Bughra Khan meeting his son Muiz ud-Din Qaiqabad after a long enmity. After Qaiqabad suffered a stroke in 1290, nobles appointed his three-year-old son Shams ud-Din Kayumars as Sultan. A Turko-Afghan named Jalal ud-Din Firuz Khalji then marched on Delhi, killed Qaiqabad and became Sultan, thus ending the Mamluk dynasty of the Delhi Sultanate and starting the Khalji dynasty.

Jalal ud-Din Firuz Khalji appreciated poetry and invited many poets to his court. Khusrau was honoured and respected in his court and was given the title "Amir". He was given the job of "Mushaf-dar". Court life made Khusrau focus more on his literary works. Khusrau's ghazals which he composed in quick succession were set to music and were sung by singing girls every night before the Sultan. Khusrau writes about Jalal ud-Din Firuz:

The King of the world Jalal ud-Din, in reward for my infinite pain which I undertook in composing verses, bestowed upon me an unimaginable treasure of wealth.

In 1290, Khusrau completed his second masnavi, Miftah ul-Futuh (Key to the Victories), in praise of Jalal ud-Din Firuz's victories. In 1294, Khusrau completed his third divan, Ghurrat ul-Kamaal (The Prime of Perfection), which consisted of poems composed between the ages of 34 and 41.

Alexander is Lowered into the Sea, from a Khamsa of Amir Khusrau Dihlavi, attributed to Mukanda c. 1597–98, Metropolitan Museum of Art

After Jalal ud-Din Firuz, Ala ud-Din Khalji ascended to the throne of Delhi in 1296. Khusrau wrote the Khaza'in ul-Futuh (The Treasures of Victory) recording Ala ud-Din's construction works, wars and administrative services. He then composed a khamsa (quintet) with five masnavis, known as Khamsa-e-Khusrau (Khamsa of Khusrau), completing it in 1298. The khamsa emulated that of the earlier poet of Persian epics, Nizami Ganjavi. The first masnavi in the khamsa was Matla ul-Anwar (Rising Place of Lights) consisting of 3310 verses (completed in 15 days) with ethical and Sufi themes. The second masnavi, Khusrau-Shirin, consisted of 4000 verses. The third masnavi, Laila-Majnun, was a romance. The fourth voluminous masnavi was Ayina-i Iskandari, which narrated the heroic deeds of Alexander the Great in 4500 verses. The fifth masnavi was Hasht-Bihisht, which was based on legends about Bahram V, the fifteenth king of the Sasanian Empire. All these works made Khusrau a leading luminary in the world of poetry. Ala ud-Din Khalji was highly pleased with his work and rewarded him handsomely. When Ala ud-Din's son and future successor Qutb ud-Din Mubarak Shah Khalji was born, Khusrau prepared the horoscope of Mubarak Shah Khalji in which certain predictions were made. This horoscope is included in the masnavi Saqiana.

In 1300, when Khusrau was 47 years old, his mother and brother died. He wrote these lines in their honour:

A double radiance left my star this year
Gone are my brother and my mother,
My two full moons have set and ceased to shine
In one short week through this ill-luck of mine.

Khusrau's homage to his mother on her death was:

Where ever the dust of your feet is found is like a relic of paradise for me.

Khusrau was accepted in Alauddin's court but the negligence was notable. Ziauddin Barani accuses Alauddin of not recognizing Khusrau's worth:

"If a poet like Amir Khusrau had lived in the time of Mahmud or Sanjar, those monarchs would have bestowed territories and governorships on him and raised him to high dignity and office. But Alauddin paid no regard to the honour due to such a poet and was content to give him his one thousand tankas"

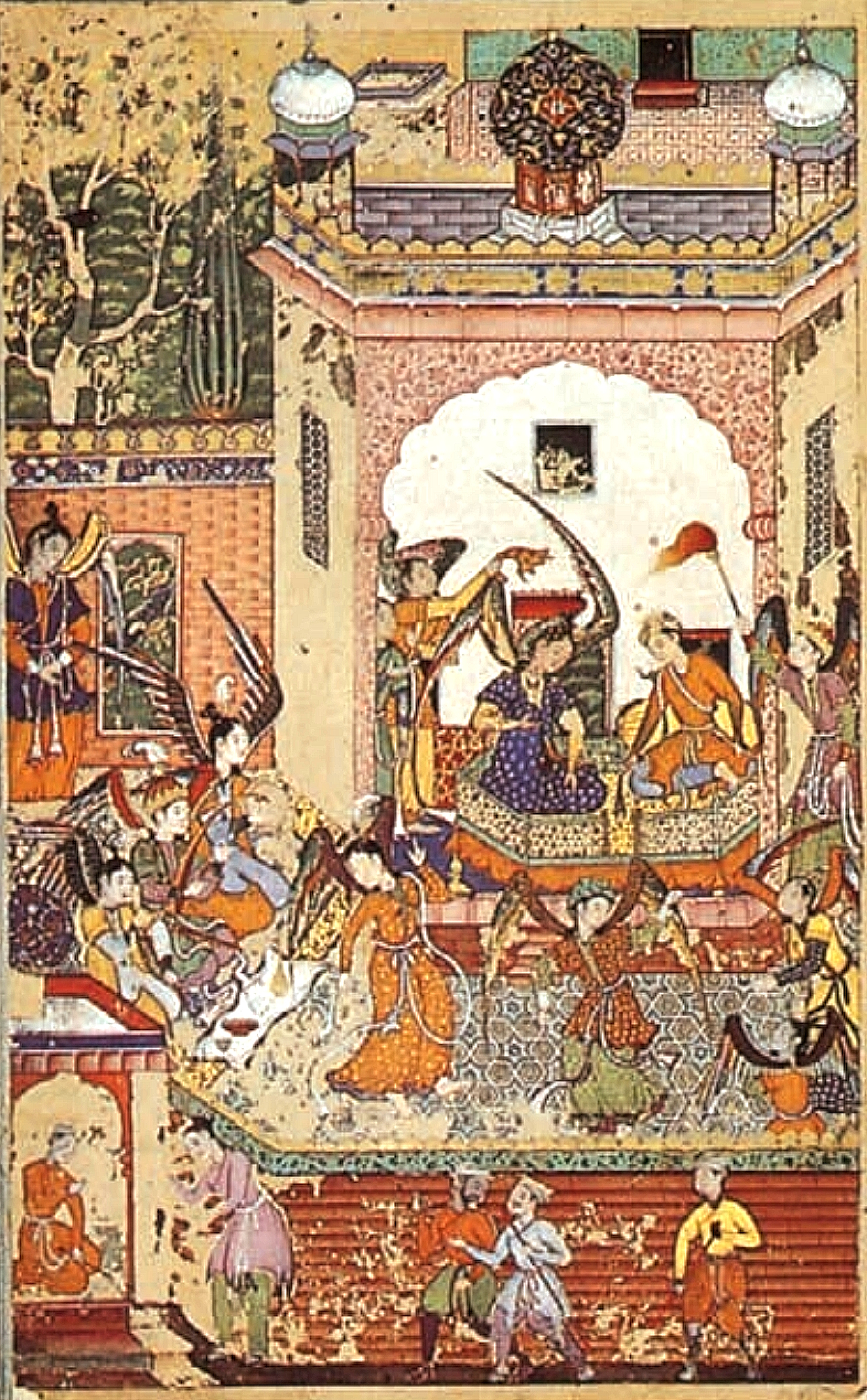
Khizr Khan and Deval Devi enthroned. Duval Rani Khizr Khan of Amir Khusrau Dihvali. Scribe, Sultan Bayazid ibn Nizam. Mughal, dated A.H. 976 (1568) National Museum, New Delhi (L53.217).

In 1310, Khusrau became a disciple of Sufi saint of the Chishti Order, Nizamuddin Auliya. In 1315, Khusrau completed the romantic masnavi Duval Rani - Khizr Khan (Duval Rani and Khizr Khan), about the marriage of the Vaghela princess Duval Rani to Khizr Khan, one of Ala ud-Din Khalji's sons.

After Ala ud-Din Khalji's death in 1316, his son Qutb ud-Din Mubarak Shah Khalji became the Sultan of Delhi. Khusrau wrote a masnavi on Mubarak Shah Khalji called Nuh Sipihr (Nine Skies), which described the events of Mubarak Shah Khalji's reign. He classified his poetry in nine chapters, each part of which is considered a "sky". In the third chapter he wrote a vivid account of India and its environment, seasons, flora and fauna, cultures, scholars, etc. He wrote another book during Mubarak Shah Khalji's reign by name of Ijaz-e-Khusravi (The Miracles of Khusrau), which consisted of five volumes. In 1317 Khusrau compiled Baqia-Naqia (Remnants of Purity). In 1319 he wrote Afzal ul-Fawaid (Greatest of Blessings), a work of prose that contained the teachings of Nizamuddin Auliya.

In 1320, Mubarak Shah Khalji was killed by Khusro Khan, who thus ended the Khalji dynasty and briefly became Sultan of Delhi. Within the same year, Khusro Khan was captured and beheaded by Ghiyath al-Din Tughlaq, who became Sultan and thus began the Tughlaq dynasty. In 1321, Khusrau began to write a historic masnavi named Tughlaq Nama (Book of the Tughlaqs) about the reign of Ghiyath al-Din Tughlaq and that of other Tughlaq rulers.

Khusrau died in October 1325, six months after the death of Nizamuddin Auliya. Khusrau's tomb is next to that of his spiritual master in the Nizamuddin Dargah in Delhi. Nihayat ul-Kamaal (The Zenith of Perfection) was compiled probably a few weeks before his death.

=== Shalimar Bagh Inscription ===
A popular fable which has made its way into scholarship ascribes the following famous Persian verse to Khusrau:

Agar Firdaus bar ru-ye zamin ast,
Hamin ast o hamin ast o hamin ast.

In English: "If there is a paradise on earth, it is this, it is this, it is this." This verse is believed to have been inscribed on several Mughal structures, supposedly in reference to Kashmir, specifically a particular building at the Shalimar Garden in Srinagar, Kashmir (built during the reign of Mughal Emperor Jahangir).

However, recent scholarship has traced the verse to a time much later than that of Khusrau and to a place quite distant from Kashmir. Historian Rana Safvi inspected all probable buildings in the Kashmir garden and found no such inscription attributed to Khusrau. According to her the verse was composed by Sa'adullah Khan, a leading noble and scholar in the court of Jahangir's successor and son Shah Jahan. Even in popular memory, it was Jahangir who first repeated the phrase in praise of Kashmir.

== Contributions to Hindustani music ==
=== Qawwali ===
Khusrau is credited with fusing the Persian, Arabic, Turkic, and Indian singing traditions in the late 13th century to create qawwali, a form of Sufi(Islamic ) devotional song. A well-punctuated chorus emphasising the theme and devotional refrain coupled with a lead singer utilising an ornate style of fast taans and difficult svara combinations are the distinguishing characteristics of a qawwali. Khusrau's disciples who specialised in Qawwali singing were later classified as Qawwals (they sang only Muslim devotional songs) and Kalawants (they sang mundane songs in the Qawwali style). The musical flow of some of his poems has made them favorites of musicians even today.

=== Tarana and Trivat ===
Tarana and Trivat are also credited to Khusrau. Musicologist and philosopher Jaidev Singh has said: Tarana was entirely an invention of Khusrau. Tarana is a Persian word meaning a song. Tillana is a corrupt form of this word. True, Khusrau had before him the example of Nirgit songs using śuṣk-akṣaras (meaningless words) and pāṭ-akṣaras (mnemonic syllables of the mridang). Such songs were in vogue at least from the time of Bharat. But generally speaking, the Nirgit used hard consonants. Khusrau introduced two innovations in this form of vocal music. Firstly, he introduced mostly Persian words with soft consonants. Secondly, he so arranged these words that they bore some sense. He also introduced a few Hindi words to complete the sense... It was only Khusrau's genius that could arrange these words in such a way to yield some meaning. Composers after him could not succeed in doing so, and the tarana became as meaningless as the ancient Nirgit. It is believed that Khusrau invented the tarana style during his attempt to reproduce Gopal Naik's exposition in raag Kadambak. Khusrau hid and listened to Gopal Naik for six days, and on the seventh day, he reproduced Naik's rendition using meaningless words (mridang bols) thus creating the tarana style.

== Legacy ==
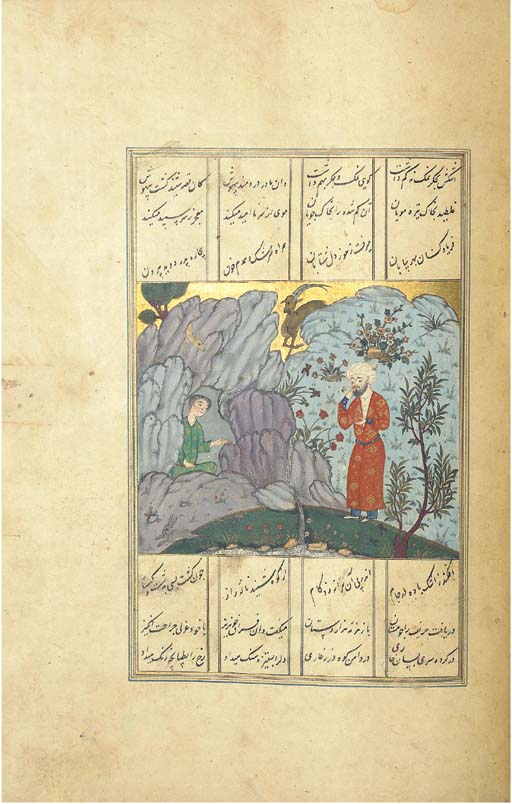
An illustrated manuscript of one of Amir Khusrau's poems

Amir Khusrau was a prolific classical poet associated with the royal courts of more than seven rulers of the Delhi Sultanate. He wrote many playful riddles, songs and legends which have become a part of popular culture in South Asia. His riddles are one of the most popular forms of Hindavi poetry today. It is a genre that involves double entendre or wordplay. Innumerable riddles by the poet have been passed through oral tradition over the last seven centuries. Through his literary output, Khusrau represents one of the first recorded Indian personages with a true multicultural or pluralistic identity. Musicians credit Khusrau with the creation of six styles of music: qaul, qalbana, naqsh, gul, tarana and khyal, but there is insufficient evidence for this.

=== Development of Hindavi ===
Khusrau wrote primarily in Persian. Many Hindustani (or Hindi-Urdu) verses are attributed to him, since there is no evidence for their composition by Khusrau before the 18th century. The language of the Hindustani verses appears to be relatively modern. He used the term 'Hindavi' (meaning 'of Hind, i.e. India or Indians' in Persian) for the Hindustani language, and gave shape to it in the Islamic literature.

He also wrote a war ballad in Punjabi. In addition, he spoke Arabic and Sanskrit. His poetry is still sung today at Sufi shrines throughout India.

== In popular culture ==
The 1978 film Junoon opens with a rendition of Khusrau's Aaj Rung Hai, and the film's plot sees the poem employed as a symbol of rebellion.

Amir Khusro, a documentary feature covering his life and works directed by Om Prakash Sharma released in 1974. It was produced by the Government of India's Film's Division.

Amir Khusro, an Indian television series based on Khusrau's life and works aired on DD National, the national public broadcaster, in the 1980s. He was portrayed by actor Bhawani Muzamil as a court poet of Alauddin Khalji in the 2018 Indian film Padmaavat by Sanjay Leela Bhansali.

One of Khusro's poems on Basant, Sakal ban, was quoted in an episode of Saladin Ahmed's The Magnificent Ms. Marvel. Various renditions of this poem have been recorded time and again, including one sung by Rizwan-Muazzam in Season 8 of Coke Studio Pakistan, as well as another rendition by Pakistani singer Meesha Shafi in collaboration with the instrumental funk band Mughal-e-Funk. It was also recreated in the Netflix web series Heeramandi, sung by Raja Hassan.

== Works ==
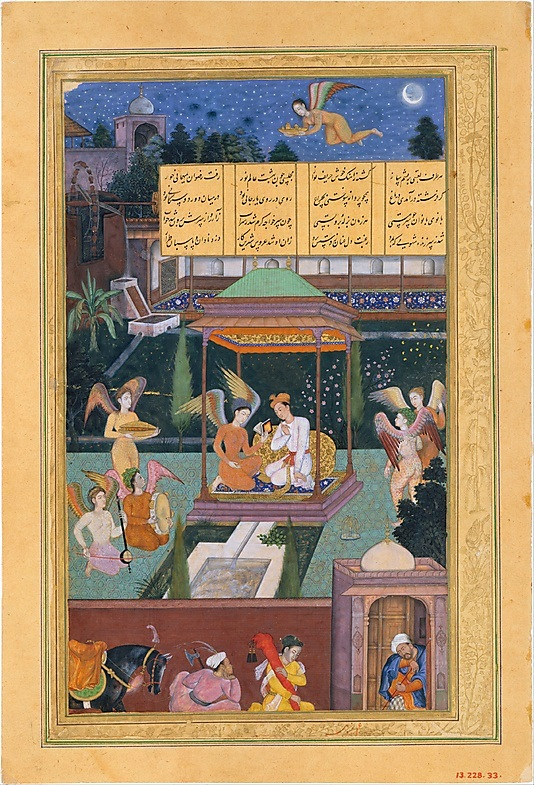
Mughal illustrated page from the Hasht-Bihisht, Metropolitan Museum of Art

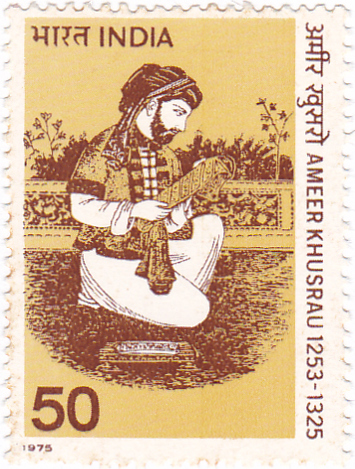
Indian Postal stamp depicting Amir Khusrou, 1975

- Tuhfat us-Sighr (The Gift of Childhood), 1271 - Khusrau's first divan, contains poems composed between the ages of 16 and 18.
- Wast ul-Hayat (The Middle of Life), 1279 - Khusrau's second divan.
- Qiran us-Sa'dain (Meeting of the Two Auspicious Stars), 1289 - Khusrau's first masnavi, which detailed the historic meeting of Bughra Khan and his son Muiz ud-Din Qaiqabad after a long enmity.
- Miftah ul-Futuh (Key to the Victories), 1290 - Khusrau's second masnavi, in praise of the victories of Jalal ud-Din Firuz Khalji.
- Ghurrat ul-Kamaal (The Prime of Perfection), 1294 - poems composed by Khusrau between the ages of 34 and 41.
- Khaza'in ul-Futuh (The Treasures of Victories), 1296 - details of Ala ud-Din Khalji's construction works, wars, and administrative services.
- Khamsa-e-Khusrau (Khamsa of Khusrau), 1298 - a quintet (khamsa) of five masnavis: Matla ul-Anwar, Khusrau-Shirin, Laila-Majnun, Ayina-i Iskandari and Hasht-Bihisht (which includes The Three Princes of Serendip).
- Saqiana - masnavi containing the horoscope of Qutb ud-Din Mubarak Shah Khalji.
- Nuh Sipihr (Nine Skies), 1318 - Khusrau's masnavi on the reign of Qutb ud-Din Mubarak Shah Khalji, which includes vivid perceptions of India and its culture.
- Ijaz-e-Khusravi (The Miracles of Khusrau) - an assortment of prose consisting of five volumes.
- Baqia-Naqia (Remnants of Purity), 1317 - compiled by Khusrau at the age of 64.
- Afzal ul-Fawaid (Greatest of Blessings), 1319 - a work of prose containing the teachings of Nizamuddin Auliya.
- Tughlaq Nama (Book of the Tughlaqs), 1320 - a historic masnavi of the reign of the Tughlaq dynasty.
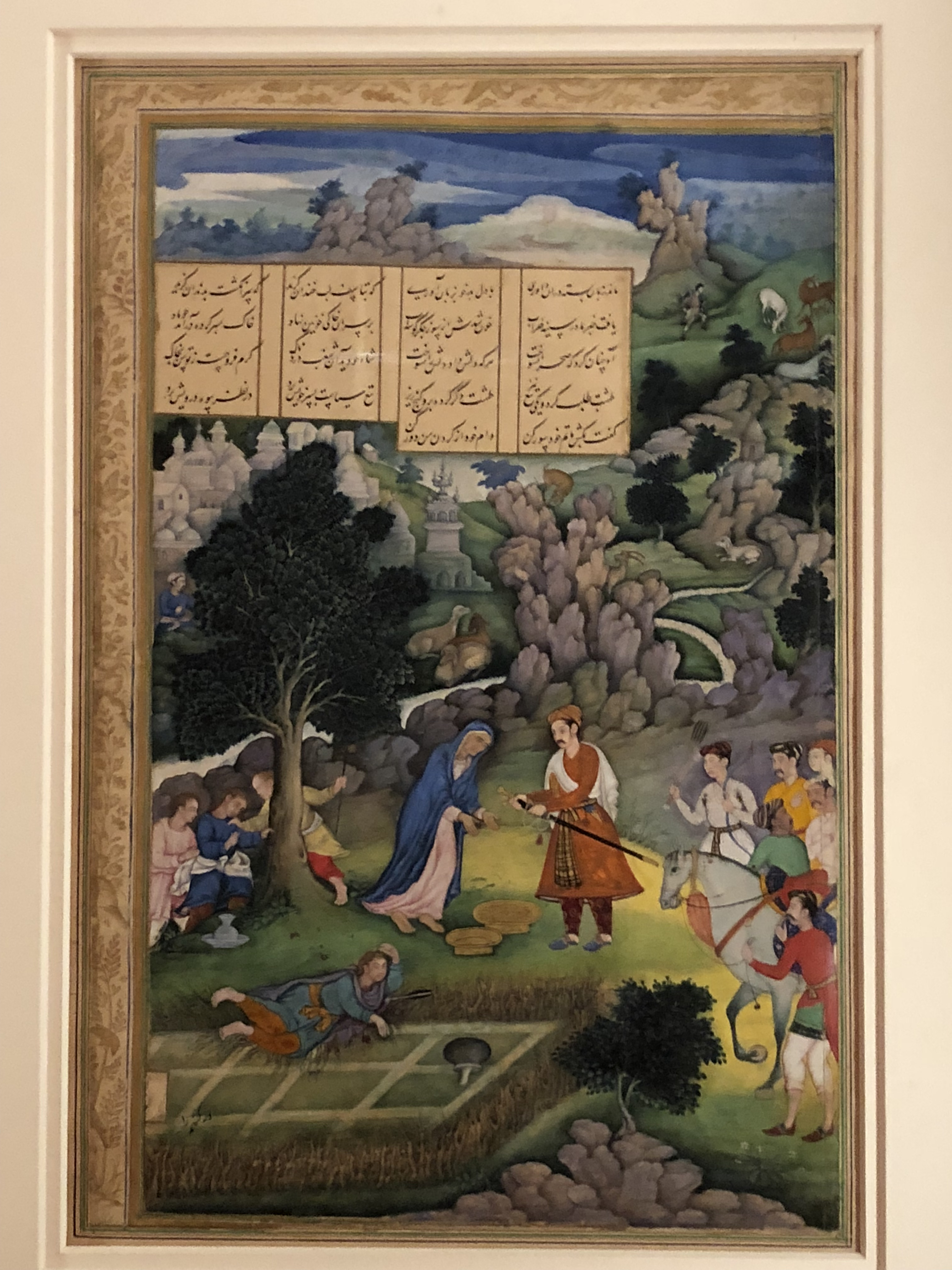
  "A King Offers to Make Amends to a Bereaved Mother" is a painting based on a story written by Amir Khusrau Dihlavi, but illustrated by Mughal Indian artist, Miskin, in 1597–98.
- Nihayat ul-Kamaal (The Zenith of Perfection), 1325 - compiled by Khusrau probably a few weeks before his death.
- Duval Rani - Khizr Khan, also known as Ashiqa, 1316 - a tragic masnavi about the marriage of princess Duval Rani to Ala ud-Din Khalji's son Khizr Khan
- Qissa Chahar Dervesh (The Tale of the Four Dervishes) - a dastan told by Khusrau to Nizamuddin Auliya.
- Ḳhāliq Bārī - a versified glossary of Persian, Arabic, and Hindavi words and phrases often attributed to Amir Khusrau. Hafiz Mehmood Khan Shirani argued that it was completed in 1622 in Gwalior by Ẓiyā ud-Dīn Ḳhusrau.
- Jawahir-e-Khusravi - a divan often dubbed as Khusrau's Hindavi divan.

== See also ==
- Chhaap Tilak Sab Chheeni
- Dama Dam Mast Qalandar
- Haft Peykar
- Jahan-e-Khusrau
- Khamsa of Nizami
- Indian literature
- List of Persian poets and authors
