= Jaithara =

- Village/Town
- Location in Uttar Pradesh, India
- Coordinates: 27°30′38″N 79°01′15″E
- Country: India
- State: Uttar Pradesh
- District: Etah

Area
  - Total: 2 km^{2} (0.77 sq mi)

Population (2012)
  - Total: 10,897
  - Density: 5,400/km^{2} (14,000/sq mi)

Languages
  - Official: Hindi
- Time zone: UTC+5:30 (IST)

Jaithara is a village and a nagar panchayat in Aliganj Tehsil in the district of Etah, Uttar Pradesh, India.

== Demographics ==
As of 2012, Jaithara had a population of 10,897. Males constituted 54% of the population and females 46%. Jaithara had an average literacy rate of 71%, higher than the national average of 59.5%; male literacy was 75%, and female literacy was 67%. Sixteen percent of the population waces under 10 years of age.
