= Kasganj =

- City
- Nickname: Kasganj
- Location in Uttar Pradesh, India
- Coordinates: 27°48′30″N 78°38′45″E
- Country: India
- State: Uttar Pradesh
- District: Kasganj

Government
  - Chairman: Meena Maheshwari, (BJP) ()

Area
  - Total: 22.18 km^{2} (8.56 sq mi)
- Elevation: 177 m (581 ft)

Population (2011)
  - Total: 101,241
  - Density: 4,565/km^{2} (11,820/sq mi)

Languages
  - Official: Hindi
- Time zone: UTC+5:30 (IST)
- PIN: 207123
- Telephone code: 05744
- Vehicle registration: UP-87
- Website: kasganj.nic.in

Kasganj is a city, or nagar, and the district headquarters of Kasganj district in the Indian state of Uttar Pradesh. The district was formed by grouping three tehsils on 17 April 2008.

== History ==
Kasganj, which lies in the historical region of Braj, was also known as "Khasganj" during Mughal and British periods. According to Imperial Gazetteer of India Vol. XV (1908) by William Wilson Hunter, Kasganj came in the hands of James V. Gardner, who was employed by the Marathas and later by the British service. Gardner later died in Chhaoni, Kasganj. Gardner's father Colonel William Linnaeus Gardner was also stationed there. William Gardner built his estate in Kasganj after retiring from the army. He also died in Kasganj, in July 1835. William and James Gardner belonged to the lineage of Baron Gardner of Uttoxeter, England. Famous writer and historian William Dalrymple came to Kasganj in search of Julian Gardner, heir to the English Barony, while researching for his book White Mughals. The book Wanderings of a Pilgrim in Search of the Picturesque by Fanny Parkes gives details of her visits to Kasganj (then called "Khasgunge") and mentions the town and the Gardner family.

An older description mentioned Kasganj as standing on an elevated site, its drainage flowing towards the Kali Nadi ("black stream"), which runs about a mile southeast of the town. The town was constituted a municipality in 1868. Kasganj's position in the strategic Indo-Gangetic plain figured in military and political vicissitudes of ancient kingdoms, from the Mahabharata onwards. It formed part of the grand empire of Harshavardhana, and it finds mention in the accounts of the 7th century Chinese pilgrim Hsien Tsang (Xuanzang), who passed this way in 647 AD.

Near Kasganj is a village called Atranjikhera, where Lord Gautam Buddha once kept his anniversary, and the place is revered as a holy pilgrim place for Buddhists. Excavations began in 1962 and revealed that site was occupied from 1200 BCE to 300 BCE Various artifacts and ruined structures from the ancient town have been found in Atranji Khera Achalpur (Chauhan's kingdom). Another village near Kasganj, Jakhera, is also a major archaeological excavation site. Iron tools such as sickles, hoes, ploughshares and terracotta figurines dating back from 1000 BCE to 600 BCE have been found in Jakhera. This suggests that Jakhera was a part of the Painted Grey Ware culture and the Northern Black Polished Ware culture of ancient India. Research conducted on these artifacts suggests that Kasganj has had a rich history since ancient and medieval times. Kasganj was founded by Nawab Yaqoot Ali Khan, a descendant of the Nawabs of Farrukhabad. The city was known as Yaqoot Ganj in the early sixteenth century. The inscription regarding its establishment is still visible in the city's jama masjid (congregational mosque). It is said that the well-protected building at Tehsil Road, which houses the tehsil, was the residence of Nawab Yaqoot Ali Khan until it was acquired by the British after fall of Awadh. Later, the city came into the hands of Kunwar Maharaj Singh Jain, then succeeded by the late Kumar Bhartendra Singh Jain, the only Zamindars of the city. The city was established in this location because it represented a centre point in the road connections between various small, ancient cities of District Etah, such as Bilram, Marehra, Etah, Sakeet, Atranji Khera, and Aligarh.

== Geography ==
Kasganj is located at 27.82°N 78.65°E. It has an average elevation of 177 metres (580 feet) above sea level. The Kasganj block was established on 26 January 1956. The Patiyali block was established on 2 October 1957. The Sahawar and Amapur block was established on 1 April 1958. The Soron block was established on 2 October 1958. The Ganjdundwara block was established on 1 April 1959. The Sidhpura block is established on 2 October 1959.

== Climate ==
Kasganj features a humid subtropical climate. Close to the foothills of the Himalayas, the winters are moderate, with temperatures at times reaching 5 °C. The summers are hot and dry, with temperatures regularly exceeding 40 °C. The monsoon season runs from the end of June to September. During the monsoon season, almost daily showers are not an uncommon phenomenon. From October onward, the weather is pleasant. Proper winter begins in late November.

== Demographics ==
As per the provisional data of the 2011 census, Kasganj had a population of 101,241, composed of 53,507 males and 47,734 females. The literacy rate was 77.36%. The local languages are Brajbhasha and Kannauji.

Religions in Kasganj
Religion	Percent
Hindus	67.34%
Muslims	29.94%
Others†	2.72%
Distribution of religions †Includes Sikhs (0.21%), Buddhists (0.68%).

== Education ==
The Kasganj district has 107 inter-colleges (12th college), 27 I.T.I colleges, 39 degree colleges, 7 post-graduation colleges, and 1 engineering college.

== Transport ==
Kasganj is strategically located and is well connected by a road and railway network. It is situated on State Highway 33 Agra-Budaun-Bareilly (also known as the Mathura-Barielly highway), and is 30 km away from the Grand Trunk Road. It is 114 km from Agra, 107 km from Mathura, and 220 km from the National Capital Region via the Yamuna Expressway.

=== Roads ===
Etah is connected to Kasganj by road only. It is also connected to the capital of India, Delhi, through a very frequent roadways service. The frequency of road and rail transport to and from Kasganj makes it easily accessible throughout the year.

Soron, also known as "Soronji" among its devotees, is a small town known for its religious significance. It is located only 15 km from Kasganj. Since the construction of the road bridge on the "Gangaji," it is very convenient to travel toward the Budaun and Bareilly side.

Kachhla, a small settlement on the banks of Ganges, is only 30 km from Kasganj.

=== Railways ===
Kasganj has a well established railway network since the time of British rule. It lies on a trijunction and it is connected to Mathura, Kanpur and Bareilly through rail network in three different directions. Trains to cities like Mumbai, Kolkata, Ahmedabad, and Kamakhya are easily available.
