= Soron =

- Town
- Location in Uttar Pradesh, India
- Coordinates: 27.88°N 78.75°E
- Country: India
- State: Uttar Pradesh
- District: Kasganj
- Elevation: 179 m (587 ft)

Population (2011)
  - Total: 27,468

Languages
  - Official: Hindi
- Time zone: UTC+5:30 (IST)
- Postal code: 207403
- Vehicle registration: UP-87

Soron is a town in the Indian state of Uttar Pradesh. It is historically known as a Hindu pilgrimage site, as described in the Sūkarakṣetra-Māhātmya in the Varaha Purana. The present-day Sita-Ram temple in Soron is the site of earlier construction around the 9th or 10th century. As of 2011, Soron had a population of 27,468, in 4,611 households.

== Names ==
Historical names of Soron include Sūkara, Sūkarakṣetra, Saukaraka, and Sūkaratīrtha (or Śūkaratīrtha). These are related to the Hindi word "shukar", meaning "wild boar", after Varaha.

== History ==
Soron is located on the Budhi Ganga, a palaeochannel (former course) of the Ganges. As late as the mid-1600s, this was still the main course of the Ganges; it only changed course in the late 1600s.

The Sūkarakṣetra-Māhātmya forms part of the Varaha Purana. It "celebrates the sanctifying virtues of the pilgrimage town of Sukara", which is supposed to be the place where Varaha slew the demon Hiranyaksha. In 1648, while still a young prince, the future king Raj Singh I of Mewar visited Soron as part of a pilgrimage to various holy sites in the region such as Mathura, Allahabad, and Varanasi. He later commissioned an illustrated manuscript of the Sūkarakṣetra-Māhātmya, which is still extant and is dated by its colophon to October 1655. It was written by a scribe named Hirananda and featured paintings by the miniaturist Sahibdin. This is Sahibdin's last known work.

Kasganj district was formed on 17 April 2008 by splitting Kasganj, Patiali and Sahawar tehsils from Etah district. Amir Khusro belongs to Patiali tehsil of the district. Soron is the birthplace of the famous Bhakti saint Bhagat Tulsidas (1497-1623).

== Geography ==
Once located on the bank of the Ganges river, Soron lies about 10 km (6.2 mi) from its present course. It is approximately equidistant from Agra, Khair, Aligarh, Bareilly & Mathura.

== Demographics ==
As of 2011, Soron had a population of 27,468, in 4,611 households. This population was 53.4% male (14,658) and 46.6% female (12,810). The 0-6 age group numbered 4,263 (2,282 male and 1,981 female), making up 15.5% of the total population. 4,593 residents were members of Scheduled Castes, or 16.7% of the total.

== Temples ==
Many temples are situated there. Pilgrims gather on each Amavasya, Somvati Amavasya, Tulsi Jayanti, Deepawali, Sharad-Poornima, Margasheersh Mela, Makar Sankranti and Ramanavami are special occasions for such gatherings.

An ancient Varah Mandir with a 130 kg (290 lb) brass bell is there. An ancient temple Sitaramji Mandir has stone sculptures pillars. The temple is taken care of by Archeological Survey of India. This temple was partly destroyed by fanatic ruler Aurangzeb during his invasion.

The so-called Sita-Ram temple, located in Soron on Lehara Road, is heavily modified from its original form. The original adhiṣṭhāna, or raised platform, is still standing, along with various other elements such as supporting pillars and parts of the roof and ceiling. These parts can be dated to approximately the 9th or 10th century on stylistic grounds, during the later part of the Pratihara period. The main hall as it exists today was built much later, on top of the original foundation and reusing those other original elements. Although the temple is now named after Sita and Rama, whose statues are inside the temple at the rear (south) wall, this name is of relatively recent origin.

== Fairs ==
In October and November, Soron hosts an animal fair. All types of animals are traded. Horses and camels are auctioned. It lasts for up to a month. In December, Soron hosts a fair named Margashirsh Mokshda Ekadashi mela. During the fair, people take baths in the holy Hari Ki Paudi.

== See also ==
- Government Polytechnic, Soron (Kasganj)
