= Kasganj district =

Kasganj district कासगंज जिला (Kasganj Jila) Kanshiram Nagar District
- District of Uttar Pradesh
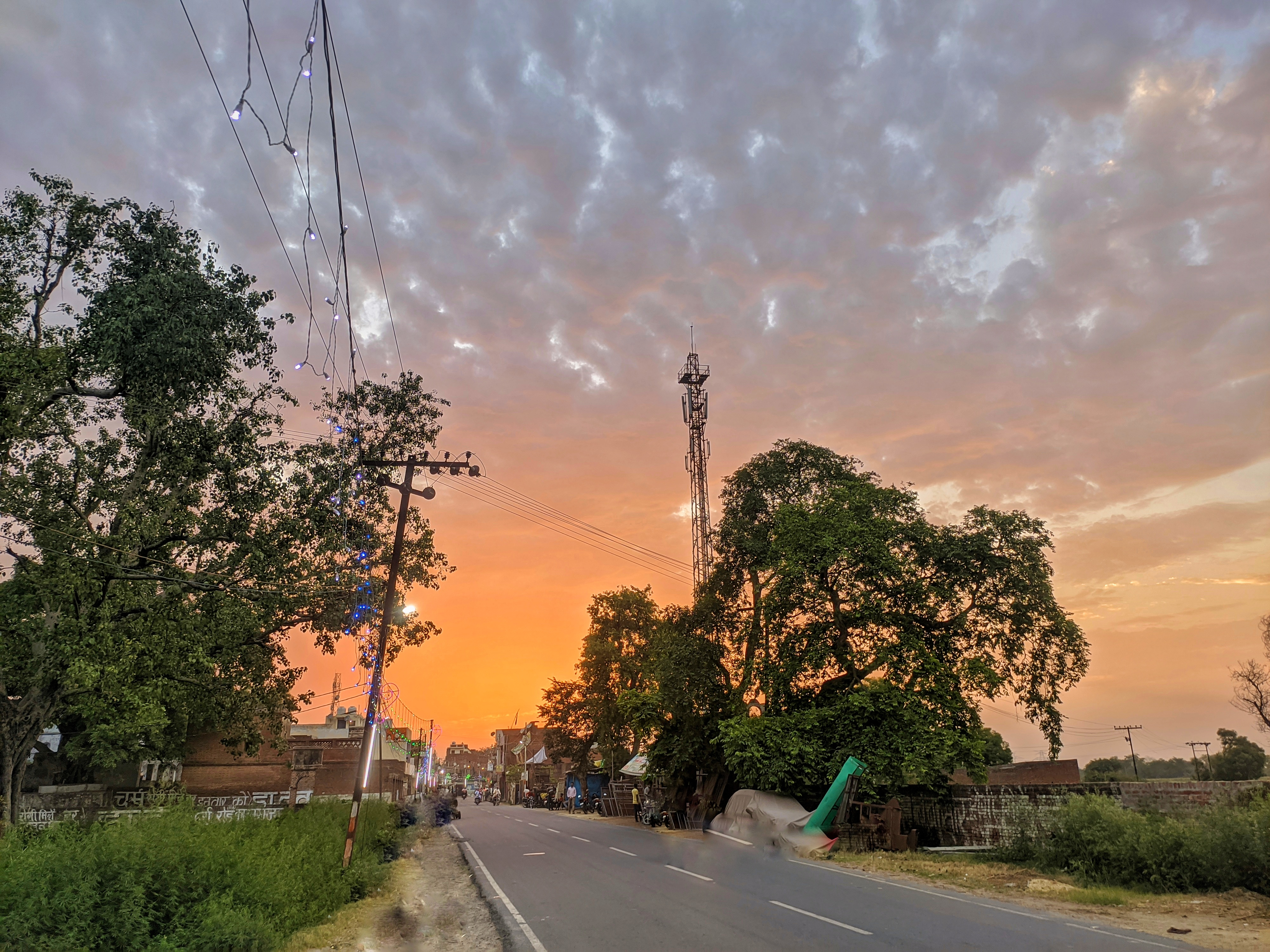
- Sunset in Bilram

- Coordinates: 27.82°N 78.65°E
- Country: India
- State: Uttar Pradesh
- Division: Aligarh
- Established: 17 April, 2008
- Named for: Kans (Saccharum spontaneum) Forests
- Headquarters: Kasganj

Government https://kasganj.nic.in/ https://uppolice.gov.in/frmOfficials.aspx?kasganj&cd=MwAyADQA https://kasganj.nic.in/about-district/whos-who/
  - Type: Administrative district of Government of Uttar Pradesh
  - Body: District Administration of Kasganj
  - District Magistrate: Pranay Singh
  - Superintendent of police: Om Prakash Singh-I
  - Additional district Magistrate (Finance & Revenew) ADM(F&R): Digvijay Pratap Singh
  - Additional District Magistrate (Judicial) ADM (J): Manzoor Ahmad Ansari
  - Assistant Superintendent of police (ASP): Shushil Kumar Ganga Prasad
  - Chief Development Officer (India) (CDO): Veerendra Singh
- Member of Parliament (MP): Devesh Shakya, Etah Lok Sabha constituency

Area
  - Total: 1,993 km^{2} (770 sq mi)
  - Rank: 68 out of 75 in Uttar Pradesh https://kasganj.nic.in/about-district/
- Elevation: 177 m (581 ft)

Population (2011)https://kasganj.nic.in/
  - Total: 1,436,719
  - Rank: 50th out of 75 in Uttar Pradesh
  - Density: 720.9/km^{2} (1,867/sq mi)

Languages
  - Official: Hindi
- Time zone: UTC+5:30 (IST)
- ISO 3166 code: IN-UP-KN
- Literacy: 62.3%
- Website: https://kasganj.nic.in/

Kasganj district (earlier called Kanshiram Nagar) is the 71st district of the Indian state Uttar Pradesh. It is located in the division of Aligarh and consists of Kasganj, Patiyali and Sahawar tehsils. Its headquarters is at Kasganj.

== Etymology ==
The district or particularly kasganj city is known as Kasganj because it established a thick forest of Kans (Saccharum spontaneum). It was also known as Tanay or Khas during Mughal and British period. Initially, after separation from Etah district, the District was named after a politician Kanshi Ram as Kanshiram Nagar.

== History ==
The district lies in the cultural region of Braj. Kasganj was established on 17 April 2008 by separating Kasganj, Patiyali and Sahawar tehsils from Etah district. For a while, the district was named after a politician, Kanshi Ram. The decision taken by Mayawati, chief minister of Uttar Pradesh and president of the BSP provoked protests by lawyers who had proposed to call it in honor of Sant Sant Tulsidas, who was born in the district, that place known as Soron (Sukarkshetra). The district reverted to its original name in 2012. Adjacent districts of Kasganj are Aligarh, Budaun, Etah, Farrukhabad and Atrauli Tehsil.

== Map of the district ==
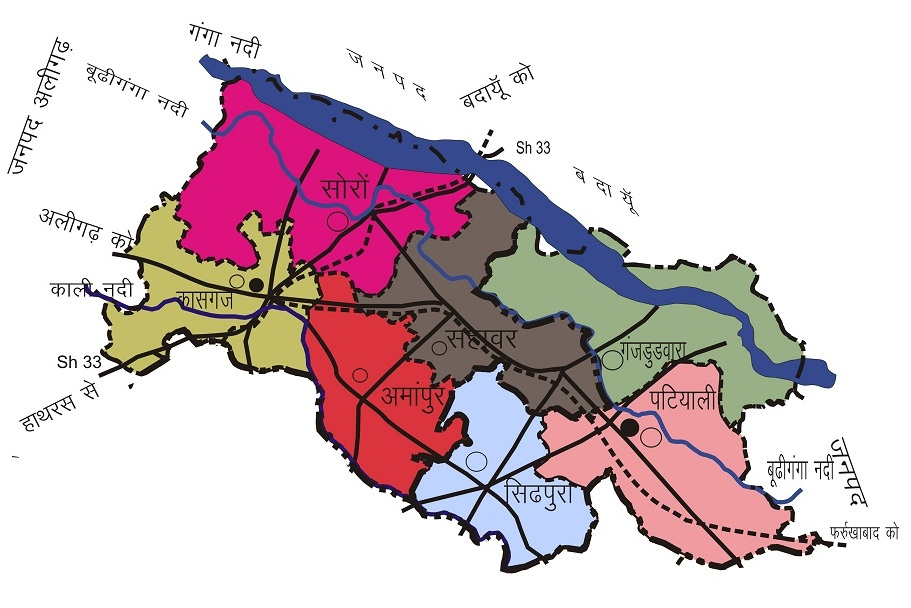
Map of Kasganj district with 7 development blocks and Roads and Railway paths with 3 major rivers of District.

== Demographics ==
Historical population
Year	Pop.	±% p.a.
1901	386,383	—
1911	389,747	+0.09%
1921	371,135	−0.49%
1931	384,897	+0.36%
1941	440,490	+1.36%
1951	502,930	+1.33%
1961	588,879	+1.59%
1971	699,806	+1.74%
1981	826,616	+1.68%
1991	991,289	+1.83%
2001	1,228,705	+2.17%
2011	1,436,719	+1.58%

Religions in Kasganj district (2011)
Religion	Percent
Hinduism	84.32%
Islam	14.88%
Other or not stated	0.80%
Distribution of religions

According to the 2011 census Kasganj district has a population of 1,436,719, roughly equal to the nation of Eswatini or the US state of Hawaii. This gives it a ranking of 345th in India (out of a total of 640). The district has a population density of 736 inhabitants per square kilometre (1,910/sq mi). Its population growth rate over the decade 2001–2011 was 17.05%. Kasganj has a sex ratio of 879 females for every 1,000 males, and a literacy rate of 62.3%. 20.06% of the population lived in urban areas. Scheduled Castes make up 17.70% of the population.

Languages of Kasganj district (2011)
1. Hindi (91.5%)
2. Urdu (8.27%)
3. Others (0.28%)

At the time of the 2011 Census of India, 91.45% of the population in the district spoke Hindi and 8.27% Urdu as their first language. The local languages are Brajbhasha and Kannauji.

== Notable people ==
- Goswami Tulsidas: He was a Vaishnava (Ramanandi) Hindu saint, devotee and poet, renowned for his devotion to lord Rama. He composed the Ramcharitmanas and Hanuman Chalisa.
- Amir Khusro: He was a Sufi singer, musician, court poet and scholar, who lived during the period of the Delhi Sultanate.
- Anup Upadhyay: He is an Indian stage, film and television actor.

== See also ==
- Dholna
