= Piparahi =

Piparahi is one of the habitations/localities of Amwa Khas village (gram panchayat) in the Kushinagar district of Uttar Pradesh. It comes under the Dudahi block of Tamkuhi Raj tehsil in the district. The locality is located about 5 kilometers away from the Gandaki River to the east. It is also about 3 kilometers near Uttar Pradesh-Bihar border to the north. The village is additionally 10 kilometers away from the broad-gauge Dudahi Railway Station, 35 kilometers away from the Tamkuhi Raj Assembly constituency on the Grand Trunk Road, and 38 kilometers from the district secretariat of Padrauna. Piparahi has one government primary school and one private primary school, that being Shri Mahatma Gandhi Gyan Mandir. This locality has two temples and a market, Piparahi Bazar.
