= Jungle Khirkia =

Village in Uttar Pradesh, India

Jungle Khirkia Khirkiya
- Village
- Country: India
- State: Uttar Pradesh
- District: Kushinagar
- Block: Padrauna

Population (2011)
  - Total: 7,285
- Time zone: UTC+5:30 (IST)

Jungle Khirkia, also known as Khirkiya, is a village in Padrauna block of Kushinagar district in the Indian state of Uttar Pradesh. It had a population of 7,285 in 2011 and is known for the Khirkiya Mata temple, a Durga temple on the bank of the Jharhi river.

== Demographics ==
In the 2011 census, Jungle Khirkia had a population of 7,285 in 1,090 households, of whom 3,750 were male and 3,535 female, a sex ratio of 943 females per 1,000 males. Children aged six and under numbered 1,390. Scheduled Castes made up 13.6 per cent of the population and Scheduled Tribes 1.7 per cent. The literacy rate among those aged seven and over was 60.0 per cent (71.2 per cent for males and 48.0 per cent for females).

== Economy ==
The village economy is agricultural. Of 2,154 workers recorded in 2011, 59.7 per cent were agricultural labourers and 20.9 per cent cultivators; household industry accounted for 4.4 per cent and other work for 14.9 per cent.

== Khirkiya Mata temple ==
The Khirkiya Mata temple, dedicated to Durga, stands on the bank of the Jharhi river, with a Shiva temple in the same compound. It draws devotees throughout the year, particularly during Navaratri, including some from Bihar. In 2024 the state government sanctioned about ₹1.02 crore (US$110,000) to develop the two temples as a tourist site, and in April 2026, after a shila puja (stone-worship ceremony), construction began on the shikhara (spire) of the temple's new building.

== Transport ==
Khirkiya is the end point of the second phase of a bypass planned for Padrauna along the Gandak canal; in 2023 the state government sanctioned a 9-kilometre (5.6 mi) section from Parsauni Kala in Padrauna to Azad Chowk in Khirkiya bazaar.
