= Vinay Prakash Gond =

Member of the Uttar Pradesh Legislative Assembly

Member of Uttar Pradesh Legislative Assembly
- Incumbent
- Assumed office March 2022
- Preceded by: Ramanand Baudh
- Constituency: Ramkola

Personal details
- Born: 1 January 1976 (age 50) Kushinagar, Uttar Pradesh
- Party: Bharatiya Janata Party
- Spouse: Sangita Devi
- Children: 3
- Parent: Gaya Prasad (father)
- Education: Secondary Education
- Alma mater: Ashok Vidyapith Inter College
- Occupation: Farmer
- Profession: Politician

Vinay Prakash Gond is an Indian politician, farmer, and a member of the 18th Uttar Pradesh Assembly from the Ramkola Assembly constituency of Kushinagar. He is a member of the Bharatiya Janata Party.

== Early life ==
Vinay Prakash Gond was born on 1 January 1976 in Bhathahi Khurd, Kushinagar, to a Hindu family of Gaya Prasad. He married Sangita Devi on 1 January 1983, and they had three children.

== Education ==
Vinay Prakash Gond completed his higher secondary education at Ashok Vidyapith Inter College, Gorakhpur, in 1993.

== Posts held ==
#	From	To	Position	Comments
01	2022	Incumbent	Member, 18th Uttar Pradesh Assembly	

== See also ==
- 18th Uttar Pradesh Assembly
- Ramkola Assembly constituency
- Uttar Pradesh Legislative Assembly
