= Kasia Assembly constituency =

Former constituency of the Uttar Pradesh legislative assembly in India

Kasia

Constituency details
- Country: India
- Region: North India
- State: Uttar Pradesh
- District: Kushinagar
- Lok Sabha constituency: Padrauna Lok Sabha constituency

Kasia Vidhan Sabha constituency was one of the 425 Vidhan Sabha constituencies of Uttar Pradesh state in central India. It was a part of the Kushinagar district and one of the assembly constituencies in the Padrauna Lok Sabha constituency. Kasia Assembly constituency came into existence in 1974 and ceased to exist in 2008 as a result of "Delimitation of Parliamentary and Assembly Constituencies Order, 2008".

== Members of Vidhan Sabha ==
Year	Member	Party
Till 1974 : See Kushinagar
1974	Raj Mangal Pande	Indian National Congress
1977	Raj Mangal Pande	Janata Party
1980	Raj Mangal Pande	Indian National Congress (U)
1985	Surya Pratap Shahi	Bharatiya Janata Party
1989	Brahma Shankar Tripathi	Janata Dal
1991	Surya Pratap Shahi	Bharatiya Janata Party
1993	Brahma Shankar Tripathi	Janata Dal
1996	Surya Pratap Shahi	Bharatiya Janata Party
2002	Brahma Shankar Tripathi	Samajwadi Party
2007	Brahma Shankar Tripathi	Samajwadi Party
2012 onwards : See Kushinagar

== See also ==
- Kushinagar
- Kushinagar Lok Sabha constituency
- Uttar Pradesh
