= List of NDTV personnel =

List of NDTV employees

NOTE: This shouldn't be an article as the word "list" is in the heading

The following is a list of notable current and past news anchors, correspondents, hosts, regular contributors and meteorologists from the Indian News channels NDTV, NDTV India, NDTV Profit and NDTV Prime news networks.

== Executives ==
- Sonia Singh Editorial Director of NDTV and President of the NDTV Ethics Committee.

== Current personalities ==
- Ambika Anand
- Namrata Brar

== News analysis hosts ==
- Sreenivasan Jain
- Vishnu Som

== Series and specials hosts ==
- Prannoy Roy
- Sonia Singh The NDTV Dialogues, India Decides,

== Political and legal analysts ==
Shekhar Gupta

== Former personalities ==
- Barkha Dutt
- Nidhi Razdan
- Vinod Dua
- Vikram Chandra
- Noopur Tiwari
- Sunetra Choudhury
- Pankaj Pachauri
- Rajdeep Sardesai
- Arnab Goswami
- Punya Prasun Bajpai
- Ravish Kumar
- Appan Menon
- Suparna Singh
