= Gurwalia =

- Location within Uttar Pradesh Location within India
- Coordinates: 26°45′12″N 84°05′50″E
- Country: India
- State: Uttar Pradesh
- District: Kushinagar

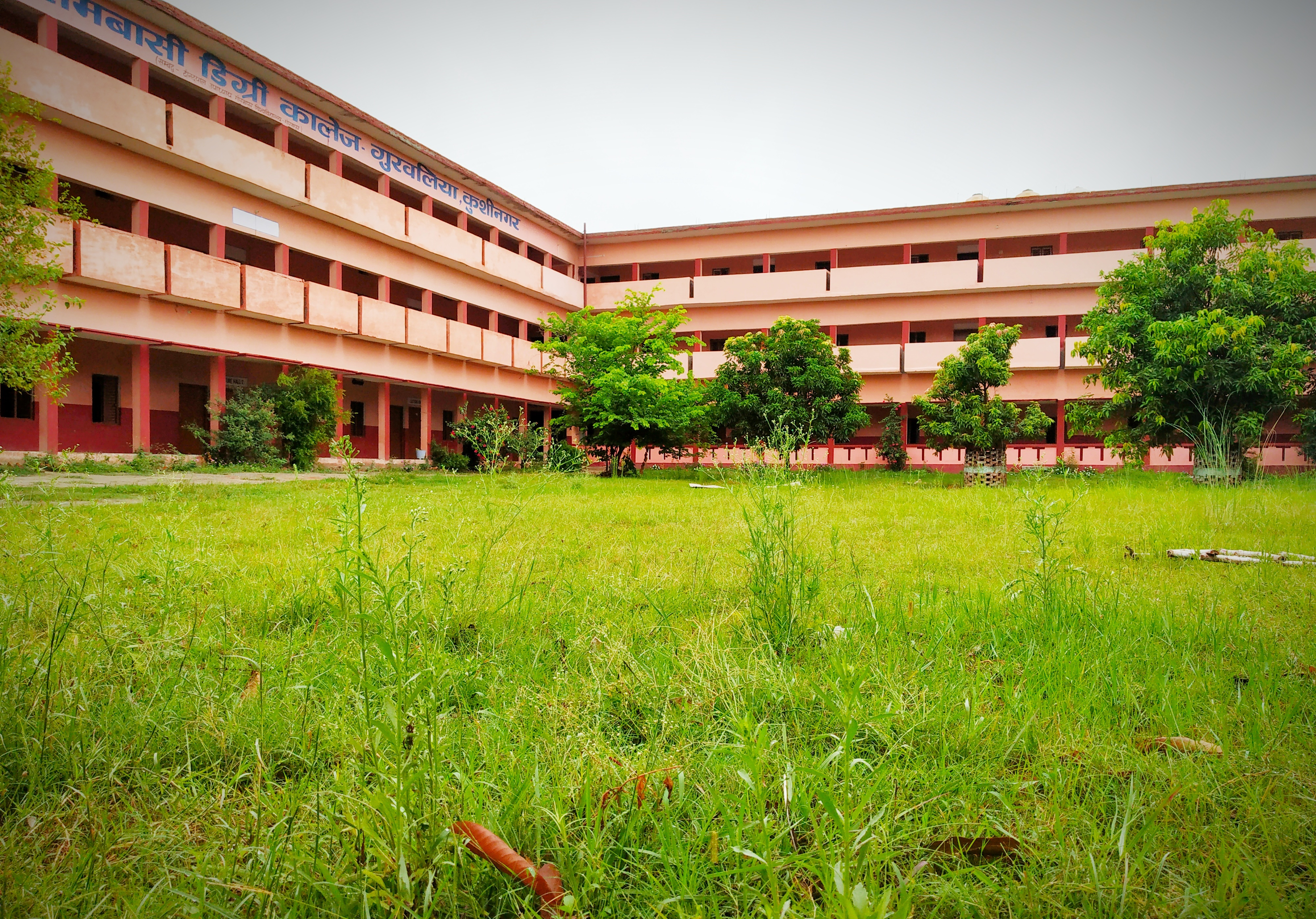

Gurwalia is a village in Kushinagar district in Uttar Pradesh state of India. Gurwalia is famous for Ravan Sanhita. Late Pandit Bageshwari pathak was a very famous astrologer who died in 2003. After his death the astrology center is headed by his son Kamakhya Prakash Pathak. Gurwalia is also a very upcoming hub for education. It has 1 degree college, bageshwari rambasi degree college, 2 intermediate colleges and 1 CBSE Board affiliated school S.P.Public School.These institutions are headed by educationist DR.Shakti Prakash Pathak, who has also been awarded by Chief Minister on teachers day.
