= Misroli =

Mishroli is a village in Kushinagar district of Uttar Pradesh state of India.
