= Kushinagar Assembly constituency =

Constituency of the Uttar Pradesh legislative assembly in India

Coordinates: 26.74°N 83.89°E

Kushinagar
- Constituency No. 333 for the Uttar Pradesh Legislative Assembly

Constituency details
- Country: India
- Region: North India
- State: Uttar Pradesh
- District: Kushinagar
- Lok Sabha constituency: Kushinagar
- Total electors: 3,73,232
- Reservation: None

Member of Legislative Assembly
- 18th Uttar Pradesh Legislative Assembly
- Incumbent Panchanand Pathak
- Party: Bharatiya Janta Party
- Elected year: 2022

Kushinagar is a constituency of the Uttar Pradesh Legislative Assembly covering the city of Kushinagar in the Kushinagar district of Uttar Pradesh, India.

Kushinagar is one of five assembly constituencies in the Kushinagar Lok Sabha constituency. Since 2008, this assembly constituency is numbered 333 amongst 403 constituencies.

== Members of Legislative Assembly ==
Year	Member	Party
1967	Ram Naresh	Samyukta Socialist Party
1969	Raj Mangal Pande	Indian National Congress
1974-2012 : See Kasia
2012	Bramhashankar Tripathi	Samajwadi Party
2017	Rajnikant Mani Tripathi	Bharatiya Janata Party
2022	Panchanand Pathak	Bharatiya Janata Party

== Election results ==
=== 2027 ===
2027 Uttar Pradesh Legislative Assembly election: Kushinagar
Party	Candidate	Votes	%	±%
NDA				
INDIA				
BSP				
AIMIM				
Majority				
Turnout				
gain from		Swing		

=== 2022 ===
2022 Uttar Pradesh Legislative Assembly election: Kushinagar
Party	Candidate	Votes	%	±%
BJP	Panchanand Pathak (P.N. Pathak)	115,268	52.14	▲4.42
SP	Rajesh Pratap Rao banti Rao	80,478	36.4	▲13.62
BSP	Mukeshwar Prasad Urf Pappu Madheshiya	16,107	7.29	▼16.8
AIMIM	Shafi Ahmed	2,796	1.26	
NOTA	None of the above	1,616	0.73	▼0.37
Majority		34,790	15.74	▼7.89
Turnout		221,074	59.23	▲1.88
BJP hold		Swing		

=== 2017 ===
Bharatiya Janta Party candidate Rajnikant Mani Tripathi won in last Assembly election of 2017 Uttar Pradesh Legislative Elections defeating Bahujan Samaj Party candidate Rajesh Pratap Rao "Banti Bhaiya " by a margin of 48,103 votes.

2017 Uttar Pradesh Legislative Assembly Election: Kushinaga
Party	Candidate	Votes	%	±%
BJP	Rajnikant Mani Tripathi	97,132	47.72	
BSP	Rajesh Pratap Rav Alias Banti Bhaiya	49,029	24.09	
SP	Brahmashankar Tripathi	46,369	22.78	
NOTA	None of the above	2,208	1.1	
Majority		48,103	23.63	
Turnout		203,549	57.35	
