= Gorariya =

Village in Uttar Pradesh, India

Coordinates: 22°01′N 76°32′E

Gorariya is a village located 15 kilometres (9.3 mi) south-east from Padruna, in the state of Uttar Pradesh, India. Markets take place periodically on Tuesdays and Saturdays. The headquarters of TechAnky and IntrendNews are located in Gorariya Bazar. IntrendNews is a local digital news sharing platform launched by Ankit Sharma. All local news of Gorariya are available on IntrendNews.

Gorariya has two divisions: Gorariya Taxi Stand, which is main hub of transportation, and Gorariya Bazar.
