= Ramanand Baudh =

Indian politician

MLA in 17th Legislative Assembly
- In office March 2017 – March 2022
- Preceded by: Purnmasi Dehati
- Constituency: Ramkola, Kushinagar

Personal details
- Born: 10 January 1964 (age 62) Belwa Khurd, Kushinagar, Uttar Pradesh
- Party: Suheldev Bharatiya Samaj Party
- Education: Graduate from Post Graduate College Kushinagar
- Occupation: MLA
- Profession: Politician

Ramanand Baudh is an Indian politician and a member of 17th Legislative Assembly of Kushinagar in the Indian state of Uttar Pradesh. He represents the Ramkola constituency of Uttar Pradesh and is a member of the Suheldev Bharatiya Samaj Party.

== Political career ==
As of 2017 Baudh was a member of the 17th Legislative Assembly of Uttar Pradesh, representing the Ramkola constituency as a member of the Suheldev Bharatiya Samaj Party. He defeated Samajwadi Party candidate Purnmasi Dehati by a margin of 55,729 votes.

== Posts held ==
#	From	To	Position	Comments
01	March 2017	March 2022	Member, 17th Legislative Assembly	

== See also ==
- Uttar Pradesh Legislative Assembly
