= Ramkola Assembly constituency =

Constituency of the Uttar Pradesh legislative assembly in India

Coordinates: 26.90°N 83.85°E

Ramkola
- Constituency No. 335 for the Uttar Pradesh Legislative Assembly

Constituency details
- Country: India
- Region: North India
- State: Uttar Pradesh
- District: Kushinagar
- Total electors: 3,71,916
- Reservation: SC

Member of Legislative Assembly
- 18th Uttar Pradesh Legislative Assembly
- Incumbent Vinay Prakash Gond
- Party: Bharatiya Janata Party
- Elected year: 2022

Ramkola is a constituency of the Uttar Pradesh Legislative Assembly covering the city of Kaptanganj and Ramkola in the Kushinagar district of Uttar Pradesh, India.

Ramkola is one of five assembly constituencies in the Kushi Nagar Lok Sabha constituency. Since 2008, this assembly constituency is numbered 335 amongst 403 constituencies.

== Members of the Legislative Assembly ==
Year	Member	Party
1962	Rajdeo	Indian National Congress
1967	Rajdeo	Indian National Congress
1969	Mangal Upadhyay	Bharatiya Kranti Dal
1974	Bankey Lal	Bharatiya Kranti Dal
1977	Bankey Lal	Janata Party
1980	Sugreev Singh	Indian National Congress (I)
1985	Sugreev Singh	Indian National Congress
1989	Madan Govind Rao	Janata Dal
1991	Ambika Singh	Bharatiya Janata Party
1993	Ambika Singh	Bharatiya Janata Party
1996	Radhey Shyam Singh	Independent
2002	Radhey Shyam Singh	Samajwadi Party
2007	Jaswant Singh	Bharatiya Janata Party
2012	Purnmasi Dehati	Samajwadi Party
2017	Ramanand Baudh	Suheldev Bharatiya Samaj Party
2022	Vinay Prakash Gond	Bharatiya Janata Party

== Election results ==
=== 2027 ===
2027 Uttar Pradesh Legislative Assembly election: Ramkola
Party	Candidate	Votes	%	±%
INDIA				
NDA				
BSP				
NOTA	None of the above			
Majority				
Turnout				
gain from		Swing		

=== 2022 ===
2022 Uttar Pradesh Legislative Assembly election: Ramkola
Party	Candidate	Votes	%	±%
BJP	Vinay Prakash Gond	124,792	58.27	
SBSP	Purnmasi Dehati	52,249	24.4	▼27.7
BSP	Vijay Kumar	23,038	10.76	▼3.67
INC	Shambhu Chaudhry	4,080	1.91	
NOTA	None of the above	2,032	0.95	▼0.67
Majority		72,543	33.87	▲5.62
Turnout		214,152	57.58	▲0.58
BJP gain from SBSP		Swing		

=== 2017 ===
Suheldev Bharatiya Samaj Party candidate Ramanand Baudh won in last Assembly election of 2017 Uttar Pradesh Legislative Elections defeating Samajwadi Party candidate Purnmasi Dehati by a margin of 55,729 votes.

2017 Uttar Pradesh Legislative Assembly Election: Ramkol
Party	Candidate	Votes	%	±%
SBSP	Ramanand Baudh	102,782	52.1	
SP	Purnmasi Dehati	47,053	23.85	
BSP	Vijay Kumar	28,471	14.43	
NISHAD	Buddha Upasak Kashyap	6,602	3.35	
Independent	Mahendra Prasad	1,868	0.95	
NOTA	None of the above	3,144	1.62	
Majority		55,729	28.25	
Turnout		197,263	57.0	

== Members of the Legislative Assembly ==
#	Term	Member of Legislative Assembly	Party	From	To	Days	Comment
01	3rd Vidhan Sabha	Rajdeo	Indian National Congress	March 1962	March 1967	1,828	
02	04th Vidhan Sabha	Rajdeo	Indian National Congress	March 1967	April 1968	402	
03	05th Vidhan Sabha	Mangal Upadhya	Bharatiya Kranti Dal	February 1969	March 1974	1,832	
04	06th Vidhan Sabha	Bankey Lal	Bharatiya Kranti Dal	March 1974	April 1977	1,153	
05	07th Vidhan Sabha	Bankey Lal	Janata Party	June 1977	February 1980	969	
06	08th Vidhan Sabha	Sugrive Singh	Indian National Congress (Indira)	June 1980	March 1985	1,735	
07	09th Vidhan Sabha	Sugrive Singh	Indian National Congress	March 1985	November 1989	1,725	
08	10th Vidhan Sabha	Madan Govind Rao	Janata Dal	December 1989	April 1991	488	
09	11th Vidhan Sabha	Ambika Singh	Bharatiya Janta Party	June 1991	December 1992	533	
10	12th Vidhan Sabha	Ambika Singh	Bharatiya Janta Party	December 1993	October 1995	693	
11	13th Vidhan Sabha	Radhey Shyam Singh	Independent	October 1996	March 2002	1,967	
12	14th Vidhan Sabha	Radhey Shyam Singh	Samajwadi Party	February 2002	May 2007	1,902	
13	15th Vidhan Sabha	Jaswant Singh Alias Atul	Bhartiya Janata Party	May 2007	March 2012	1,736	
14	16th Vidhan Sabha	Purnmasi Dehati	Samajwadi Party	March 2012	March 2017	1,829	
15	17th Vidhan Sabha	Ramanand Baudh	Suheldev Bharatiya Samaj Party	March 2017	March 2022	3476	
