= Amwa Khas =

Coordinates: 26°50′N 84°15′E

- Village
- Interactive map of Amwa Khas
- Country: India
- State: Uttar Pradesh
- District: Kushinagar
- Tehsil: Tamkuhi Raj

Area
  - Total: 26.6107 km^{2} (10.2744 sq mi)

Population (2011)
  - Total: 12,920
  - Density: 485.5/km^{2} (1,257/sq mi)
- Postal code: 274302

Amwa Khas is a village in Uttar Pradesh state of India. It is located in the Tamkuhi Raj tehsil of Kushinagar district. It is one among the 91 villages of Dudahi block of Kushinagar district.

== Demographics ==
According to the 2011 census of India, the village has 2,111 households with 12,920 people. population of persons below age 6 is 2,096. Population of Scheduled Caste is 0.0128% (1663) and Scheduled Tribes is 0.0275% (356).

The effective literacy rate of the village (i.e. literacy rate of persons aged 6 and above) is 46% (6016). It has an area of 26.6107 square km.

== Rivers ==
The Gandaki River runs from North to South-East and divides the villages in eastern and western halves. Most of the habitations of peoples are located in western half of village.
