= Khadda =

Khadda, Raja Bazaar Khadda
- Town
- Location in Uttar Pradesh, India
- Coordinates: 26.925265°N 83.946909°E
- Country: India
- State: Uttar Pradesh
- District: Kushinagar

Government
  - Body: Adarsh Nagar Panchayat Khadda since 18 August 1981.

Area
  - Total: 2 km^{2} (0.77 sq mi)

Population (2011)
  - Total: 16,121
  - Density: 8,100/km^{2} (21,000/sq mi)

Languages
  - Official: Hindi, English, Urdu, Bhojpuri
- Time zone: UTC+05:30 (IST)
- Postal code: 274802
- Vehicle registration: UP57

Khadda is a town, a nagar panchayat and a tehsil in Kushinagar district in the Indian state of Uttar Pradesh. It is situated approximately 8 kilometres (5.0 mi) from the border with Bihar and 18 kilometres (11 mi) from the India-Nepal border.

Khadda has a sugar factory, government-run intermediate colleges, one post-graduate college, cinema halls, a bus station, a railway station and a market place.

== Geography ==
Khadda is the site of Jatashankar Pokhara, which is situated in the heart of the town. The Gandaki River, a tributary of the Ganges, passes 4 kilometres (2.5 mi) from the town.

== Agriculture ==
Khadda is an agricultural hub and a big producer of sugar cane, bananas, wheat and rice. Sugar cane is the most significant crop, with the Khadda factory in operation since 1949. Banana plantations are increasingly popular and cover approximately 200 hectares (490 acres). Bananas are exported domestically and internationally. There is a large produce market. Additionally, fruits and vegetables are sent to Bihar, Nepal and Gorakhpur city. Khadda is known for the volume of milk production from its nearby 35 villages, with total production on average of 50,000 litres (11,000 imp gal; 13,000 US gal) per day. 70% of the population of Khadda is dependent on farming and the production of these products.

The Gandak Canal and Badi Gandak River (also called Narayani river) are major sources of irrigation, but during the rainy season the river sometimes produces a heavy flood, affecting many villages near Khadda.

== Sights ==
Paniyahawa Bridge, located 8 kilometres (5.0 mi) from Khadda, is a railway and national highway road bridge connecting Uttar Pradesh, Bihar and Nepal. It is also known as the "Mini Goa of Khadda". People visit this place as picnic spot and enjoy fish curry here. A special kind of silver fish called chepua is found in this region. A local sweet, pera, is made from pure milk and sugar is also very famous here.

Madanpur Devi Temple, 13 kilometres (8.1 mi) from Khadda, is dedicated to the goddess Durga. It is one of the best-known temples in the region and people from other states and places come here in April and October in Navratri season to receive the blessing of Mata Rani.

The Valmiki Tiger Reserve, 16 kilometres (9.9 mi) from Khadda, is situated in the forest of Bihar with the purpose of tiger breeding. The forest has a variety of animals and birds and is full of greenery and herbal plants.

== Transportation ==
Khadda is connected with the NE Railway route connecting Muzzafarpur in Bihar and Gorakhpur in Uttar Pradesh. The station code is KZA. It connects to the major cities in India. Khadda is approximately 80 kilometres (50 mi) from Gorakhpur by rail. There are 18 trains that stop at Khadda in each direction.

Khadda is well connected by the NH 28B highway from Kushinagar to Bihar and Nepal.

== Climate ==
Khadda Town has four seasons: winter, spring, summer and rainy season.

== Demographics ==
At the 2011 Indian census, Khadda had a population of 16,121 (51% males, 49% females). The literacy rate was 58%, lower than the national average of 74%. Male literacy was 58% and female literacy 55%. In Khadda, 15% of the population were under 6 years of age. Khadda has 75.05% Hindu population and 24.58% Muslim population.
