= Ratanjit Pratap Narain Singh =

Indian politician (born 1964)

Kunwar Ratanjit Pratap Narain Singh
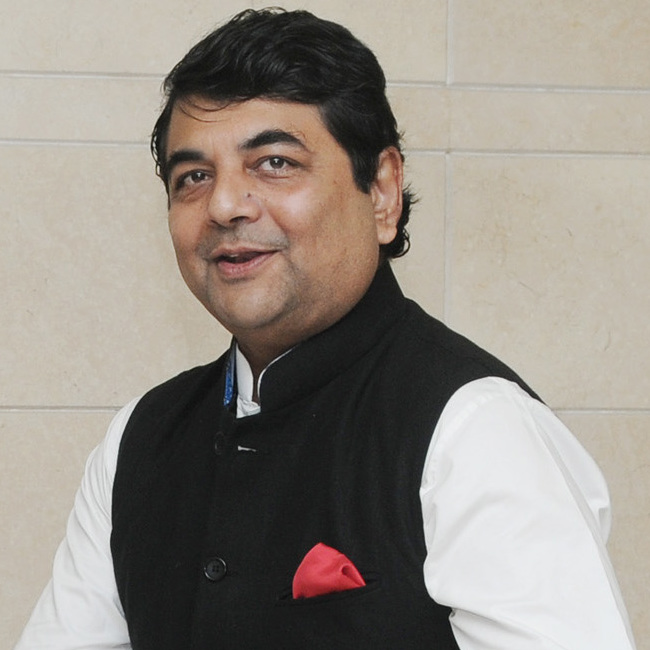

Member of Parliament, Rajya Sabha
- Incumbent
- Assumed office 2024
- Constituency: Uttar Pradesh

Minister of State for Home Affairs
- In office 28 October 2012 – 26 May 2014 Serving with M. Ramachandran
- Prime Minister: Manmohan Singh
- Minister: Sushilkumar Shinde
- Succeeded by: Kiren Rijiju

Minister of State for Petroleum & Natural Gas
- In office 19 January 2011 – 28 October 2012
- Prime Minister: Manmohan Singh
- Minister: Jaipal Reddy

Minister of State for Corporate Affairs
- In office 19 January 2011 – 28 October 2012
- Prime Minister: Manmohan Singh
- Minister: Murli Deora
- Preceded by: Jitin Prasada
- Succeeded by: Panabaka Lakshmi

Minister of State for Road Transport & Highways
- In office 28 May 2009 – 19 January 2011
- Prime Minister: Manmohan Singh
- Minister: Kamal Nath

Member of Parliament, Lok Sabha
- In office 2009–2014
- Preceded by: Constituency created
- Succeeded by: Rajesh Pandey
- Constituency: Kushi Nagar

Member of Uttar Pradesh Legislative Assembly
- In office 1996–2009
- Preceded by: Baleshwar Yadav
- Succeeded by: Swami Prasad Maurya
- Constituency: Padrauna

Personal details
- Born: 25 April 1964 (age 62) New Delhi, India
- Party: Bharatiya Janata Party (2022-present)
- Other political affiliations: Indian National Congress (1990-2022)
- Spouse: Sonia Singh
- Children: 3
- Education: The Doon School

Ratanjit Pratap Narain Singh or R. P. N. Singh (born 25 April 1964), is an Indian politician, and former Minister of State in the Ministry of Home Affairs. He was the Member of Parliament for Kushinagar constituency in the fifteenth Lok Sabha from 2009 to 2014. In the 2014 General Election, despite an increase in his own votes, he was defeated by Rajesh Pandey (BJP). He lost again in 2019. In September 2020, Singh was chosen for AICC in charge of Jharkhand and Chhattisgarh.

He resigned from Congress in January 2022 and joined the BJP, a month ahead of 2022 UP Elections, thus becoming the fourth prominent Doon School alumnus to leave the Congress Party to join hands with the BJP, following Jyotiraditya Scindia, Jitin Prasada and Amarinder Singh.

== Personal life ==
R.P.N. Singh belongs to the gaharwar rajput community . He comes from a Zamindari family of Kushinagar (Padrauna), Uttar Pradesh. He attended The Doon School, an institution which has had historic links with Congress since the Rajiv Gandhi 'Doon Cabinet' era, and given Rahul Gandhi's own schooling at Doon. From 2014 to 2018, he served as the president of Doon's alumni body The Doon School Old Boys' Society.

He was married on 7 December 2002 to Sonia Singh (nee Sonia Singh, anchor and editorial director at NDTV), and has three daughters. He currently resides in the Palace, Padrauna, Kushinagar, Uttar Pradesh, India. His father, Late C.P.N. Singh, was also MP of Kushinagar (then Hata) and a Minister of State for Defence in the Indira Gandhi cabinet in 1980.

R.P.N. Singh was elected MLA from the seat of Padrauna in 1996, 2002, and 2007. In 2009 he was elected to the Lok Sabha. He lost the Lok Sabha election from the Kushinagar seat in 2014 and 2019. Now he has been declared BJP candidate from Uttar Pradesh for Member of Parliament Rajya Sabha.

== Positions held ==
- M.L.A. (Uttar Pradesh), 1996-2009
- President, Uttar Pradesh Youth Congress, 1997-1999
- Secretary, AICC, 2003-2006
- Elected to the 15th Lok Sabha from the Padrauna constituency, 2009
- Union Minister of State, Road, Transport and Highways, 2009-2011
- Union Minister of State, Petroleum and Natural Gas and Corporate Affairs, 2011-2013
- Union Minister of state for Home Affairs 2013-2014
- President, The Doon School Old Boys' Society, 2014–2016
