= Panchanand Pathak =

Indian politician

Panchanand Pathak (P.N. Pathak)

Member of the Uttar Pradesh Legislative Assembly
- Incumbent
- Assumed office March 2022
- Preceded by: Rajnikant Mani Tripathi
- Constituency: Kushinagar

Personal details
- Party: Bharatiya Janata Party
- Parent: Lal Babu Pathak
- Occupation: MLA
- Profession: Politician

Panchanand Pathak (P.N. Pathak) is an Indian politician and a member of 18th Uttar Pradesh Assembly of Kushinagar, Uttar Pradesh of India. He represents the Kushinagar constituency of Uttar Pradesh and is a member of the Bharatiya Janata Party. He was the formal regional vice president of Gorakhpur area.

== Posts held ==
#	From	To	Position	Comments
01	March 2022	Incumbent	Member, 18th Legislative Assembly of Uttar Pradesh	

== See also ==
- Uttar Pradesh Legislative Assembly
