= Ji Mantriji =

2001 Indian Hindi-language television sitcom

- Genre: Comedy
- Written by: Alok Tomar; Monisha Shah; Noopur Tiwari
- Directed by: Smeeta Chakravarty
- Starring: see below
- Opening theme: "Ji Mantriji"
- Country of origin: India
- Original language: Hindi
- No. of seasons: 1
- No. of episodes: 38

Production
- Executive producer: Duncan Cooper from BBC Worldwide
- Running time: Approx. 25 minutes
- Production company: NDTV with BBC Worldwide

Original release
- Network: StarPlus
- Release: 26 April 2001 – 2001

Ji Mantriji (literally "Yes Minister" in Hindi) is an Indian adaptation of the British satirical sitcom Yes Minister. It was telecast on 26 April 2001 on StarPlus with permission from the BBC. The series features Farooq Sheikh as Surya Prakash Singh, the Minister of Administrative Affairs; and Jayant Kripalani as the department's secretary. The plot lines were the same as those of the original, with suitable changes in the Indian context. Ji Mantriji was produced by NDTV in collaboration with BBC Worldwide. The opening titles for each episode were illustrated by famous Indian cartoonist, R. K. Laxman, well known for his political cartoon series, The Common Man.

Ji Mantriji was in production for a year before being aired, which is unusual in Indian television where serials are generally developed and produced a few weeks in advance. The writers changed certain references to fit the new setting: France was changed to Pakistan and the European Economic Community was changed to the SAARC and the Commonwealth. A sequel, Ji Pradhanmantriji (based on the original British series' sequel Yes, Prime Minister) was also produced. The books accompanying the series were published in India by Penguin Books.

== Cast ==
- Farooq Sheikh as Surya Prakash Singh
- Jayant Kripalani as Rajnath Mathur

== Awards ==
- Hero Honda ITA Award for Best Serial Comedy
- Hero Honda ITA Award for Best Actor in a Comedy - Farooq Sheikh
