= Ramkola =

Ramkola Ramkola Dham
- Town
- Location in Uttar Pradesh, India Ramkola (India)
- Coordinates: 26.9°N 83.84°E
- Country: India
- State: Uttar Pradesh
- District: Kushinagar

Government
  - Type: Democratic
  - Body: Municipal board
- Elevation: 89 m (292 ft)

Population (2011)
  - Total: 14,433

Languages
  - Official: Hindi, Bhojpuri
- Time zone: UTC+5:30 (IST)
- PIN: 274305
- Telephone code: 05567
- Vehicle registration: UP 57 (Padrauna RTO)
- Website: up.gov.in

Ramkola is a town and a nagar panchayat in Kushinagar district which is also known as Padrauna district in the Indian state of Uttar Pradesh.

Geographically Ramkola is a fertile agricultural region and is known for large scale sugarcane cultivation. The only town in India having two sugar factories (one govt unit is closed now). Ramkola is locally famous for indigenous Rajput Clans colloquially called Thakurs and use the title Govind Rao . They were the Zamindars owning the land of around 25 kilometres in the area . Janta Inter College established in early 70s by Narpati Govind Rao is among the oldest in district.

== Geography ==
Ramkola is located at 26.9°N 83.84°E. It has an average elevation of 75 metres (246 feet).

== Temples ==
Vishva Darshan Temple is in Ramkola and contains idols of almost all of the saints and great philosophers from all over the world. The temple was built by the saint Swami Bhagwananand Ji Maharaj in the respect of his guru ji Swami Paramhans Ji. This place is the birthplace of the saint Swami Parmanand Ji Mahraj (Paramhans Ji) of Anusuiya Ashram, Chitrakoot, Uttar Pradesh. Because of this Ramkola is known as Ramkola Dham.

== Demographics ==
As reported in the 2011 India census, Ramkola had a population of 14,433. Males constituted 53% of the population, and females 47%. Ramkola had an average literacy rate of 69%, lower than the national average of 74%.
