= Dudahi Bazar =

Coordinates: 26.7977324°N 84.1357147°E

Dudahi is a nagar panchayat (town area) in the Kushinagar district of Uttar Pradesh, a state in northern India. Dudahi is situated on the Thawe–Kaptanganj railway route near Padrauna.

The area lies about 20 kilometres (12 mi) southeast of Padrauna and 13 kilometres (8.1 mi) northwest of the Tamkuhi Road railway station.

Dudahi is located at the border of Uttar Pradesh and Bihar.
