= Rajesh Pandey =

Indian politician

Member of Parliament, Lok Sabha
- In office 2014–2019
- Preceded by: Ratanjit Pratap Narain Singh
- Succeeded by: Vijay Kumar Dubey
- Constituency: Kushinagar

Member of Uttar Pradesh Legislative Council
- In office 1991–2003
- Constituency: Deoria Local Authorities

Personal details
- Born: 19 March 1959 (age 67) Kushinagar, Uttar Pradesh, India
- Party: Bharatiya Janata party
- Spouse: Sudha Pandey (m. 1980)
- Children: 1 son, 2 daughters
- Parents: Raj Mangal Pande (father); Malti Pandey (mother)
- Education: Institute of Productivity and Management, Lucknow (PGDBA)
- Profession: Builder, Agriculturist

Rajesh Pandey (born 19 March 1959) is a member of the Bharatiya Janata Party. He was a member of 16th Lok Sabha from Kushinagar Lok Sabha constituency.

== Personal life ==
Rajesh Pandey was born on 19 March 1959 to Raj Mangal Pandey and Malti Pandey in Kushinagar city of Uttar Pradesh. He completed his Post Graduate Diploma in Business Administration (PGDBA) from the Institute of Productivity and Management, Lucknow. He married Sudha Pandey on 18 February 1980, with whom he has a son and two daughters. Pandey is a builder and agriculturalist by profession.

== Politics ==
Pandey was elected Member of the Legislative Council Uttar Pradesh Legislative Council for the first time from Deoria Local Authority Constituency in 1991 and was re-elected for the second term in 1997. He is the President and Patron of several Degree Colleges and Inter-Colleges in Kasia, Kushinagar and Deoria. As an MLC, he his roles included Chairman of Privilege Committee; Deputy Leader, U.P. Vidhan Mandal Dal; Presiding Officer, U.P. Vidhan Parishad.

He has won the 2014 Indian general elections from the Kushi Nagar (Lok Sabha constituency) defeating R. P. N. Singh of INC .
