= Rajnikant Mani Tripathi =

Indian politician

MLA, 17th Legislative Assembly of Uttar Pradesh
- Incumbent
- Assumed office March 2017
- Preceded by: Bramhashankar Tripathi
- Constituency: Kushinagar

Personal details
- Born: 24 August 1958 (age 67) Deoria, Uttar Pradesh
- Party: Bharatiya Janata Party
- Spouse: Shashi Prabha (m. 1984; died 2010)
- Parent: Phanish Mani
- Occupation: MLA
- Profession: Politician

Rajnikant Mani Tripathi is an Indian politician and a member of 17th Legislative Assembly of Kushinagar, Uttar Pradesh of India. He represents the Kushinagar constituency of Uttar Pradesh and is a member of the Bharatiya Janata Party.

== Early life and education ==
Tripathi was born (24 August 1958) in Deoria, Kushinagar to his father Shri Panish Mani Tripathi. He married Shashi Prabha in 1984. He belongs to Brahmin caste. He had Post Graduate degree from Banaras Hindu University. He got BA degree in 1980, MA in 1982 and LLB in 1987.

== Political career ==
Tripathi has been a member of the 17th Legislative Assembly of Uttar Pradesh. Since 2017, he has represented the Kushinagar constituency and is a member of the BJP. He defeated Bahujan Samaj Party candidate Rajesh Pratap Rao "Team Banti Bhaiya " by a margin of 48,103 votes.

== Posts held ==
#	From	To	Position	Comments
01	March 2017	March 2022	Member, 17th Legislative Assembly	

== See also ==
- Uttar Pradesh Legislative Assembly
