= Jayant Kripalani =

Indian actor

- Education: Jadavpur University (English literature)
- Occupations: Actor, Director, Trainer, Screenwriter
- Known for: TV series: Khandaan, Mr. Mrs, Ji Mantriji
- Notable work: Well Done Abba, The Hungry

Jayant Kripalani is an Indian film, television and stage actor, director and trainer. He is most known for his role in the TV series, like Khandaan, Mr. Mrs and Ji Mantriji (2003). He also wrote the screenplay for Shyam Benegal's film, Well Done Abba (2009). He was noted for his performance in The Hungry (2017) that is based on the adaptation of William Shakespeare's Titus Andronicus. He performed in Ji Mantri Ji, the well-known star plus comedy series in years 2000 to 2002.

== Early life and education ==
He graduated from Jadavpur University with a degree in English literature.

== Career ==
He has worked at JWT, Grant Kenyon & Eckhardt and as senior creative director with RK Swamy BBDO. He was one of the first small-screen stars in India featuring in the 1980s TV serials like Khandan, as well as an appearance in the horror anthology series Aahat as a vampire, Mr. Mrs and later in Ji Mantriji (2003), the Indian adaptation of BBC's satirical sitcom, Yes Minister. Jayant has played character roles in movies like Heat and Dust (1983) directed by James Ivory, Rockford, in the Indian sci-fi thriller Alag, in the 2008 blockbuster Jaane Tu... Ya Jaane Na and in 3 Idiots (2009) movie as interview panel head.

Jayant has directed and produced films for multinationals and is actively involved with theatre. Jayant has written the scripts for the original Ghar Jamai which was aired in the old TV days of Doordarshan. He has written and produced PC aur Mausi — a mini TV series which explored the prejudices a 'mausi' (maternal aunt) had with the advent of the 'dreaded' personal computer (PC) in the mid-1980s in India. Amongst his earlier work is an educational TV programme in which children explored the statement "Why is Water Wet!" in a successful format. He also acted as a quiz master in an infotainment channel's quiz show.

== Filmography ==
=== Films ===
- Arohan (1983), Senior District Magistrate
- Heat and Dust (1983), Dr. Gopal
- Party (1984), Subhash
- Trikal (1985), Francis
- Susman (1987)
- Pehla Nasha (1993), Deepak's friend
- Rockford (1999), Brother Lawrence
- Chupke Se (2003), Mr. Arya
- Alag (2006), Pushkar Rana
- Jaane Tu... Ya Jaane Na (2008), Aditi's Father
- Ru Ba Ru (2008), Dilip
- Summer 2007 (2008), Principal
- 3 Idiots (2009), Interviewer
- Hawaizaada (2015), father of Shivkar Bapuji Talpade
- The Hungry (2017), Poddar
- Taranath Tantrik (2019), Tantrik Taranath
- Dawat-i-Biryani (2019)
- I Want to Talk (2024), Dr Deb

=== Web series ===
Year	Series	Role	Language	Platform	Notes
2020	Kark Rogue	Dr Soumitra Sengupta	Hindi, Bengali	ZEE5	
2020	Aarya	Zorawar Singh	Hindi	Hotstar	
