= Kushinagar Lok Sabha constituency =

Lok Sabha Constituency in Uttar Pradesh, India

Coordinates: 26.9°N 83.98°E

Kushinagar UP-65
- Lok Sabha constituency
- Interactive Map Outlining Kushinagar Lok Sabha constituency

Constituency details
- Country: India
- Region: North India
- State: Uttar Pradesh
- Assembly constituencies: Khadda; Padrauna; Kushinagar; Hata; Ramkola
- Established: 2008- Present
- Reservation: None

Member of Parliament
- 18th Lok Sabha
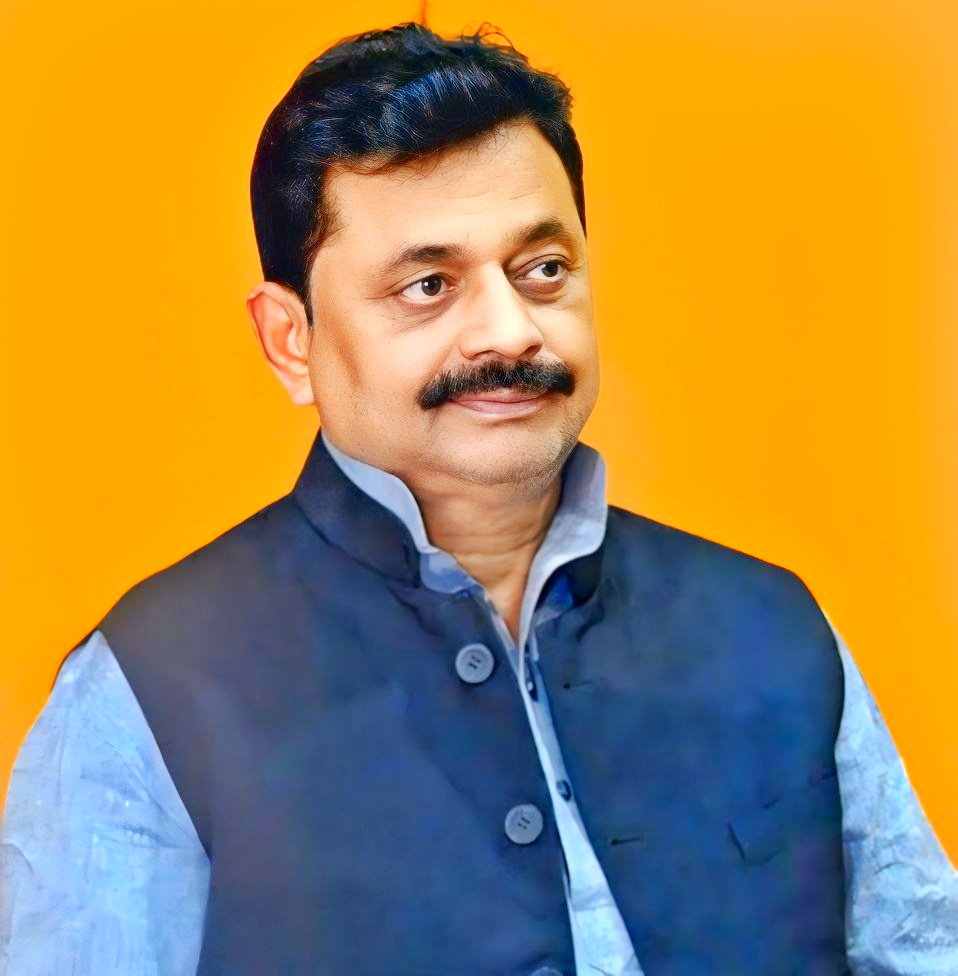
- Incumbent Vijay Kumar Dubey
- Party: BJP
- Alliance: NDA
- Elected year: 2024

Kushinagar Lok Sabha constituency is one of the 80 Lok Sabha (parliamentary) constituencies in Uttar Pradesh state in India. This constituency was created in 2008 as part of the delimitation of parliamentary constituencies, based on the recommendations of the Delimitation Commission of India constituted in 2002.

== Assembly segments ==
Presently, Kushinagar Lok Sabha constituency comprises Five Vidhan Sabha (legislative assembly) segments. These are:

| No | Name | District | Member | Party | 2024 Lead |
|---|---|---|---|---|---|
| 329 | Khadda | Kushinagar | Vivek Anand Pandey | NISHAD | SP |
| 330 | Padrauna | Kushinagar | Manish Jaiswal | BJP | BJP |
| 333 | Kushinagar | Kushinagar | Panchanand Pathak | BJP | BJP |
| 334 | Hata | Kushinagar | Mohan Verma | BJP | BJP |
| 335 | Ramkola (SC) | Kushinagar | Vinay Prakash Gond | BJP | BJP |

Ramkola, Hata and Padrauna assembly segments were earlier in erstwhile Padrauna Lok Sabha constituency.

== Members of Parliament ==
| Year | Member | Party |
|---|---|---|
Till 2009 : Constituency did not exist
| 2009 | Ratanjit Pratap Narain Singh | Indian National Congress |
| 2014 | Rajesh Pandey | Bharatiya Janata Party |
| 2019 | Vijay Dubey | Bharatiya Janata Party |
| 2024 | Vijay Dubey | Bharatiya Janata Party |

== Election results ==
=== 2024 ===
2024 Indian general elections: Kushinagar
| Party | Candidate | Votes | % | ±% |
|---|---|---|---|---|
| BJP | Vijay Kumar Dubey | 516,345 | 47.79 | ▼8.90 |
| SP | Ajay Pratap Singh | 4,34,555 | 40.22 | ▲15.58 |
| BSP | Subh Narayan Chauhan | 67,208 | 6.22 | ▲6.22 |
| NOTA | None of the Above | 9,782 | 0.91 | ▲0.12 |
| Majority | | 81,790 | 7.57 | ▼24.48 |
| Turnout | | 10,80,483 | 57.62 | ▼2.17 |
| BJP hold | | Swing | | |

=== 2019 ===
2019 Indian general elections: Kushinagar
| Party | Candidate | Votes | % | ±% |
|---|---|---|---|---|
| BJP | Vijay Kumar Dubey | 597,039 | 56.69 | ▲17.76 |
| SP | N.P. Kushwaha | 2,59,479 | 24.64 | ▲12.93 |
| INC | Ratanjit Pratap Narain Singh | 1,46,151 | 13.88 | ▼16.05 |
| ADUP | Amiruddin | 8,541 | 0.81 | N/A |
| SBSP | Rajiv | 8,454 | 0.80 | N/A |
| NOTA | None of the Above | 8,297 | 0.79 | ▼0.27 |
| Majority | | 3,37,560 | 32.05 | ▲23.05 |
| Turnout | | 10,53,309 | 59.79 | ▲3.23 |
| BJP hold | | Swing | ▲17.76 | |

=== 2014 ===
2014 Indian general elections: Kushinagar
| Party | Candidate | Votes | % | ±% |
|---|---|---|---|---|
| BJP | Rajesh Pandey | 370,051 | 38.93 | ▲16.74 |
| INC | Ratanjit Pratap Narain Singh | 2,84,511 | 29.93 | ▼0.70 |
| BSP | Dr. Sangam Mishra | 1,32,881 | 13.98 | ▼13.77 |
| SP | Radhe Shyam Singh | 1,11,256 | 11.71 | ▲4.16 |
| PECP | Kashim Ali | 9,024 | 0.95 | ▲0.95 |
| NOTA | None of the Above | 10,102 | 1.06 | ▲1.06 |
| Majority | | 85,540 | 9.00 | ▲6.12 |
| Turnout | | 9,50,792 | 56.56 | ▲5.72 |
| BJP gain from INC | | Swing | ▲8.30 | |

=== 2009 ===
2009 Indian general elections: Kushinagar
| Party | Candidate | Votes | % | ±% |
|---|---|---|---|---|
| INC | Ratanjit Pratap Narain Singh | 223,954 | 30.63 | |
| BSP | Swami Prasad Maurya | 2,02,860 | 27.75 | |
| BJP | Vijay Kumar Dubey | 1,62,189 | 22.19 | |
| SP | Bramha Shanker Tripathi | 55,223 | 7.55 | |
| IPP | Kishor Kumar | 18,726 | 2.56 | |
| SBSP | Jangi | 13,534 | 1.85 | |
| Majority | | 21,094 | 2.88 | |
| Turnout | | 7,31,275 | 50.84 | |
| INC win (new seat) | | | | |

== See also ==
- Padrauna Lok Sabha constituency
- Kushinagar district
- List of constituencies of the Lok Sabha
