= Vijay Kumar Dubey =

Indian politician

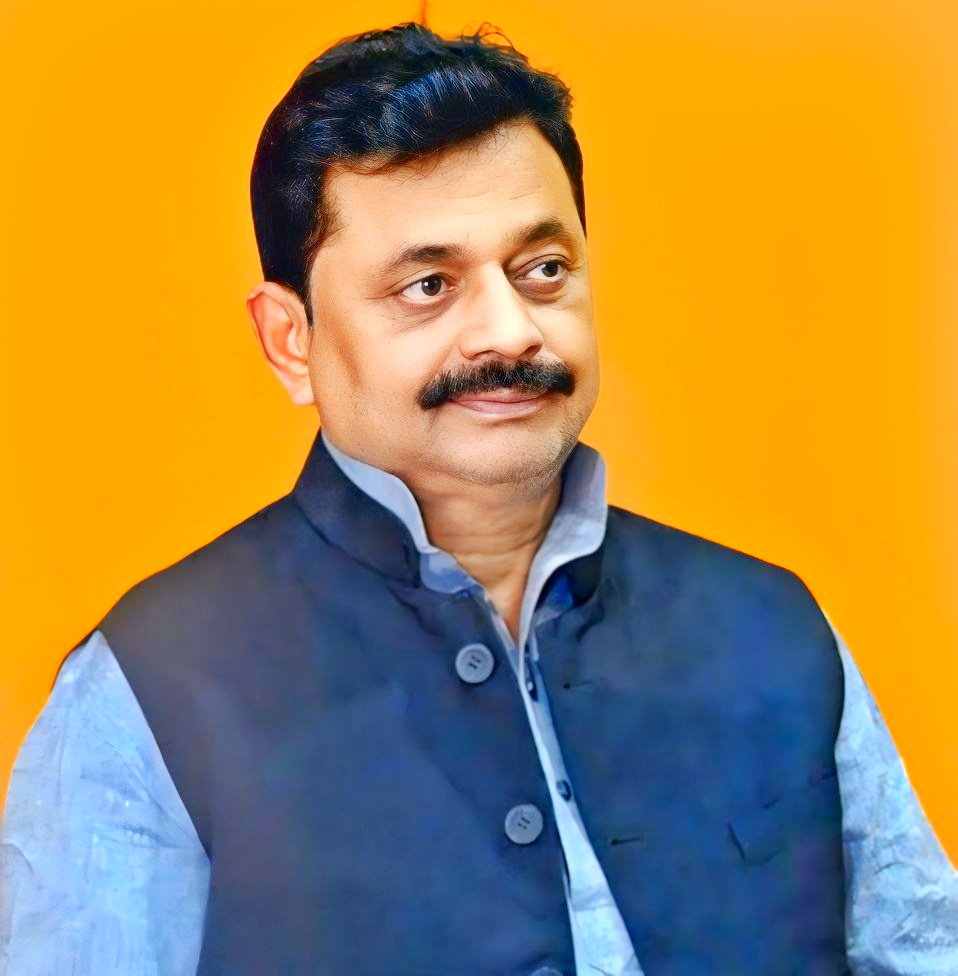

Member of Parliament, Lok Sabha
- Incumbent
- Assumed office 23 May 2019
- Preceded by: Rajesh Pandey
- Constituency: Kushinagar

Personal details
- Born: 20 June 1960 (age 65) Kushinagar, Uttar Pradesh, India
- Citizenship: India
- Party: Bharatiya Janata Party
- Spouse: Ranjana Dubey
- Profession: Farming

Vijay Kumar Dubey is an Indian politician and a Member of Parliament in the 18th Lok Sabha from Kushi Nagar. He was elected in the 2024 Indian general election.

His Wife Mrs. Ranjana Dubey was block pramukh of Khadda from 2010 to 2015.

His Son Shashank Dubey was Block Pramukh of Naurangiya Block from 2015 to 2020 and now Block Pramukh Khadda since 2020.

== Political career ==
He joined Yogi Adityanath's Hindu Yuva Vahini in 2001 and becomes district coordinator of HUY Kushinagar, since he worked hard the organisation become stronger in Kushinagar and he became close one to Yogi Adityanath.

In 2007 SP government arrested Yogi Adityanath in Gorakhpur in result of this action many strikes were happen. Vijay Kumar Dubey was arrested and detained in NSA, IPC 307 and many other charges.

Seeing his popularity in 2009 BJP declared him as Loksabha Candidate from Kushinagar Parliamentary area he was defeated.

In 2010 he left BJP & joined Congress and in 2012 he won MLA election from Khadda Assembly.

In 2016 again returned to BJP and in 2019 party announced that he will be the MP candidate, he won the general election and presently is MP Kushinagar.
