= Noopur Tiwari =

Indian journalist and activist

Noopur Tiwari is an Indian journalist, feminist, founder of a non-profit, blockchain led tech platform against sexual violence, Smashboard. She has reported live for NDTV on a broad range of key political, economic and social stories from Europe since 2004. Tiwari writes for the Hindustan Times, Business Standard, The Caravan, TheWire.in, and Scroll.in. She is the co-curator of a feminist Twitter handle called Genderlogindia. Tiwari worked as a producer with NDTV from 1996 to 2003.

Noopur Tiwari launched the social network Smashboard in 2019, with the aim of uniting a global community of feminists (regardless of their gender) with mutual aid, solidarity and feminism intersectional as essential bases. The idea of the platform dates to 2016. The #MeToo movement subsequently gave an added impetus to the development of the project.

In 2021 Smashboard won the Netexplo Innovation Grand Prize (global innovation observatory) in partnership with UNESCO.

== Career ==
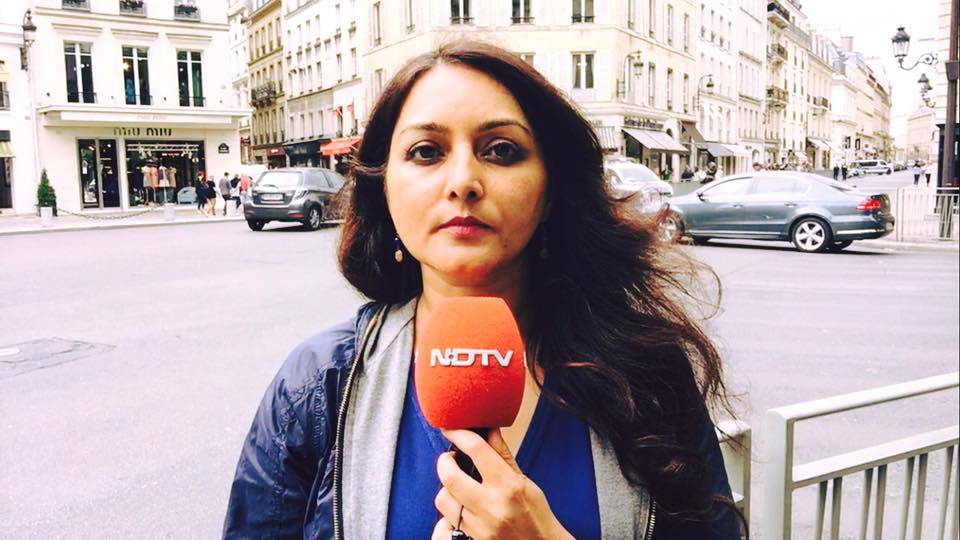
Noopur Tiwari reporting for NDTV from the Paris Climate Summit

As Europe correspondent and Resident Editor with NDTV, Tiwari reported major events and stories from all over the continent since 2004. She reported extensively on tax evasion and money laundering with exclusive interviews of major whistleblowers in the world of finance. She also contributed episodes on Sikhs in France, Indian Soldiers in WW1 for NDTV's India Matters.Her breaking news report on the French aircraft carrier Clemenceau (2004) was followed by an extensive coverage of the story in Indian media and the aircraft carrier had to eventually return after India's Supreme court ruling. In her interviews with LTTE cadre (2006), Anton Balasingham expressed regret for Rajiv Gandhi's killing which was the closest the militant outfit came to admitting their responsibility for the murder. Tiwari has covered several major elections in Europe and Indo-French bilateral visits. Tiwari also reported on the COP21 Paris summit, the Greek referendum, Papal Conclaves, Indo-French civil nuclear deal, Italy-India diplomatic row over marines, India and Pakistan at the International court of justice, the Mittal Arcelor take over. She won the ENBA 2016 award, Best International coverage for the Paris terror attacks.

== Television series ==
Noopur Tiwari launched, produced and directed the satire show Gustakhi Maaf, Great India Tamasha: for NDTV in 2004 developed with French marionette makers Alain Duverne and Laurent Huet. Tiwari was the co-scriptwriter of this adaptation of the BBC series Yes Prime Minister; co-production NDTV-BBC for STAR TV as "Ji Mantriji". Tiwari produced episodes on politicians and artists such as MF Husain, Former Indian PM VP Singh, politician Laloo Prasad Yadav for Jeena Isi Ka Naam Hai: A show on the life of celebrities on Zee TV.

In her reports on culture and lifestyle Tiwari has interviewed actors such as Leonardo DiCaprio and Meryl Streep. She has also anchored & produced lifestyle shows for "NDTV Good Times" on Wine and Art :

- Wine Country Citizen: a show on wine travel in France and South Africa
- Art Beat: a series on art and travel from Europe

== Smashboard ==
Smashboard is a non-profit that is creating an online global community of feminists to fight patriarchal violence.

The objective is to facilitate the reporting of cases of sexual violence through technology. Smashboard aims to bring together support systems for people who are victims of sexual violence by offering them a space for discussion, security and protection.

Smashboard offers four tools: a map of the world referencing all the structures and associations dedicated to women; easy access to lawyers, psychologists, and journalists looking for testimonies and victims wishing to speak out; and finally, securing testimonials and data via the blockchain.

The innovation is intended to enable victims and survivors to seek assistance anonymously and to document evidence using timestamped records. The technology allows users to create records that may be used when reporting incidents to law enforcement and judicial authorities.

== Personal life ==
Tiwari went to St Anthony's School, Agra. She studied at Miranda House and Jawaharlal Nehru University.
