= Sonia Singh (journalist) =

Indian journalist (born 1970)

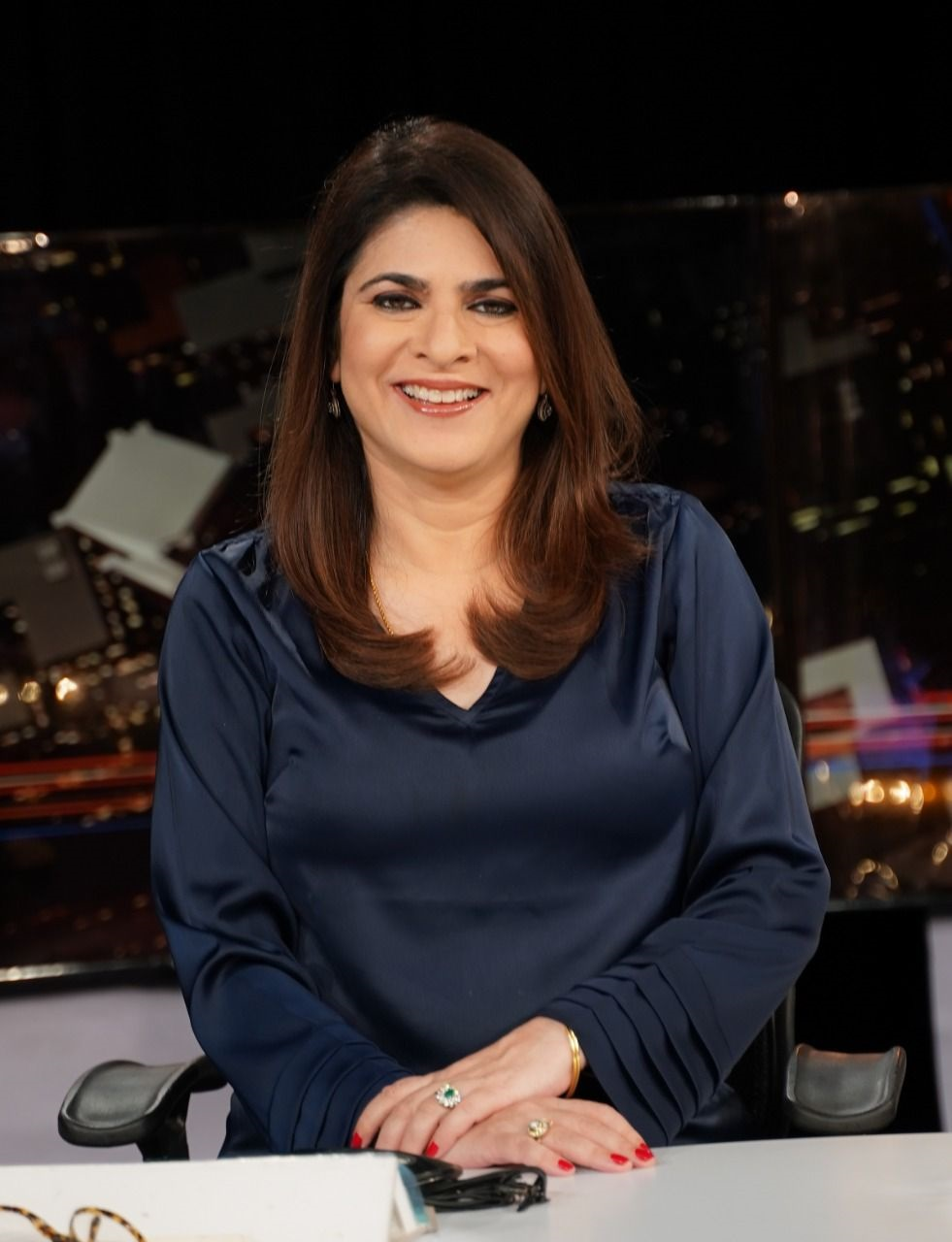
- Sonia Singh in 2022
- Born: 21 September 1970 (age 55); New Delhi, India
- Education: St. Stephen's College
- Occupation: Journalist
- Employer: NDTV till Apr 2025
- Spouse: Ratanjit Pratap Narain Singh
- Website: social.ndtv.com/soniasingh

Sonia Singh (born 21 September 1970) is an Indian journalist who serves as the editorial director and president of the NDTV ethics committee. She also hosts ‘The NDTV Dialogues’, a show focusing on understanding on key issues and a look at potential solutions.

== Early life and education ==
Sonia Singh, attended the Convent of Jesus and Mary in New Delhi, then went to St Stephens College, Delhi where she completed her master's in English Literature. She graduated with a first degree, topping the college in English Literature. She has also been recipient of a 3-month scholarship from the Government of Italy to study Italian at Perugia. She is also a Chevening Scholar and attended at broadcast journalism course at Cardiff. During her stint in UK, she also got an opportunity to meet and greet Queen Elizabeth.

== Personal life ==
Sonia Singh is married to Ratanjit Pratap Narain Singh and they have three daughters.

== Career ==
Sonia Singh joined NDTV in 1992 as a researcher when it produced one show, The World This Week for Doordarshan. Today, she is editorial director for the NDTV news network and she has overseen news ranging from the Kandahar hijack, the attack on Parliament, 26/11, the Kargil war to the Jessica Lall case.

== Awards ==
She has also received many awards for Best Talk Show, Best Anchor at the emba, as well as Ficci young achiever. In 2015, she was awarded the best Editor in Chief at the Emba awards.

== See also ==
- Ratanjit Pratap Narain Singh, Indian politician
- Ravish Kumar, Indian journalist and anchor
- Sandip Ghose, Indian writer and columnist
