= Padrauna =

- City
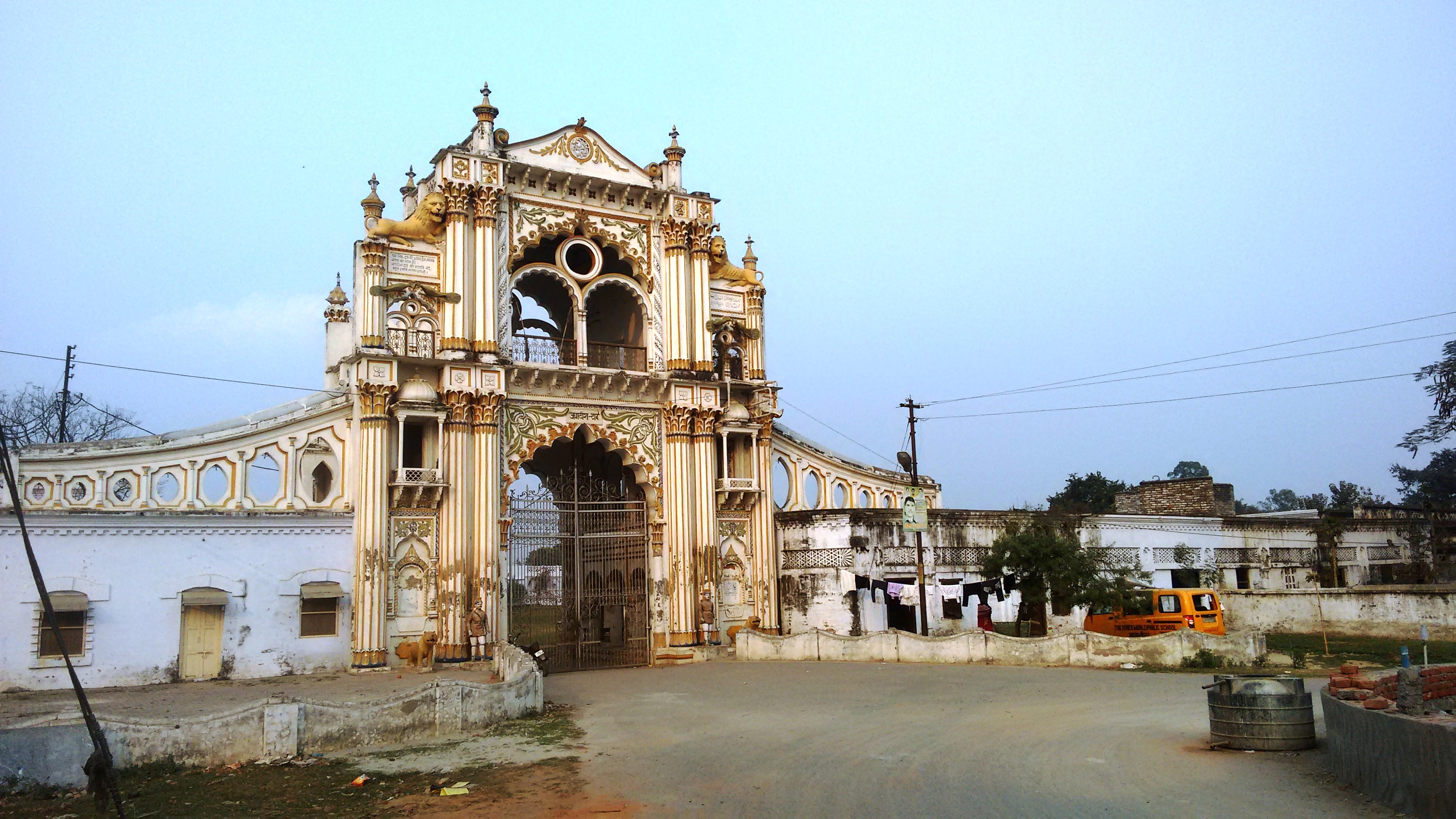
- Entrance Gate of Padrauna Palace

- Location in Uttar Pradesh, India
- Coordinates: 26.9°N 83.98°E
- Country: India
- State: Uttar Pradesh
- District: Kushinagar

Government
  - Type: Democratic
  - Body: Municipal board

Area
  - Total: 6.89 km^{2} (2.66 sq mi)

Population (2011)
  - Total: 49,723
  - Rank: 300+
  - Density: 7,220/km^{2} (18,700/sq mi)
- Time zone: UTC+5:30 (IST)
- PIN: 274304
- Telephone code: 05564
- Vehicle registration: UP-57
- Sex ratio: 950 (approx.) ♂/♀
- Website: www.kushinagar.nic.in

Padrauna is a city and headquarter of Kushinagar district in the Indian state of Uttar Pradesh. It is the place where Rama spent a few days of his life. After passing from Padrauna, Rama reached at Ramkola where he made a hut with his wife Sita and younger brother Lakshman to stay. It is situated 19 kilometres (12 mi) northeast of Kushinagar International Airport. Udit Narayan Intermediate College is the biggest College in the Kushinagar district. Padrauna was also the seat of a local zamindari estate known as the Padrauna Estate.

Padrauna is expanding its territory to the east by adding a town called Khirkiya. Khirkiya Mata Mandir is one of the most famous temples across the region. To solve Padrauna's congestion and traffic a bypass road starting from Khirkiya to Tamkuhi-Gopalganj NH 28 Road are inaugurated in 2025.

== Connectivity ==
The town is connected to many important cities through National Highway 28B and State Highway No. 64. A daily bus travels the route from Padrauna to Kanpur, while another bus route connects Padrauna with Lucknow. Padrauna Railway Station connects Padrauna to Chhapra, Gorakhpur, Lucknow, Siddharthnagar, Delhi, Katihar, Jalandar, and other important cities. Padrauna is also close to Kushinagar International Airport. The proposed Buddha Expressway between Kushinagar and Sarnath will provide connectivity with southeastern cities in the state like Varanasi, Allahabad, Azamgarh as well as Kolkata through National Highway 2 in Varanasi.

== Economy ==
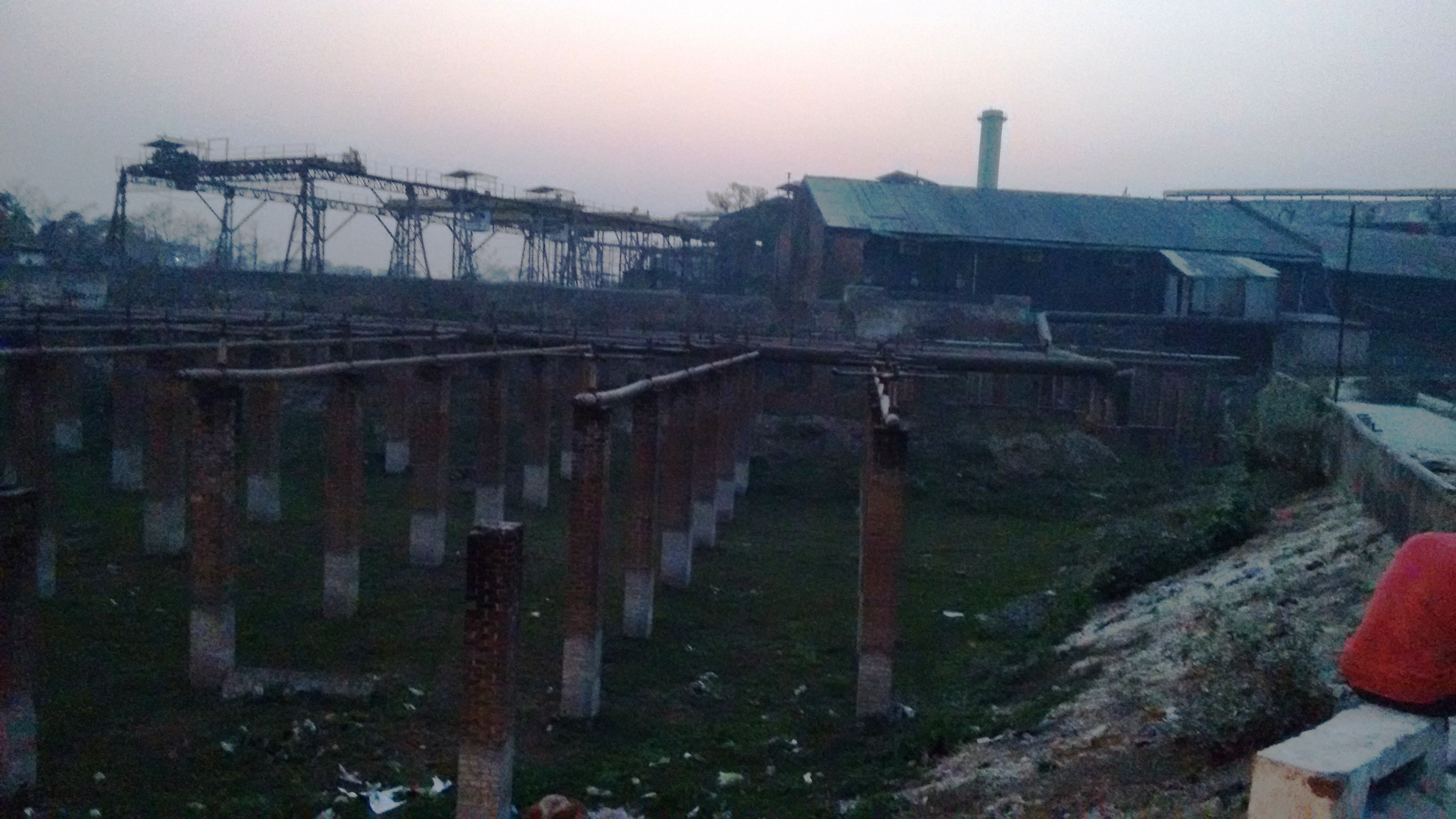
Disused sugar factory

The economy of Padrauna mainly consists of Agriculture followed by Services and a little contribution is made by Industrial sector. There are many family run businesses, shops, vendors, hawkers, etc., in tamkhurod. A number of small and mid-size hotels exist in Padrauna. Earlier there were few industries (Kanpur Sugar Works, sugar factory for example) which are no more operational. The shutting down of factories led to poverty and backwardness of this region. The backwardness is further soared by the power shortage in this region.

== Landmarks and geography ==
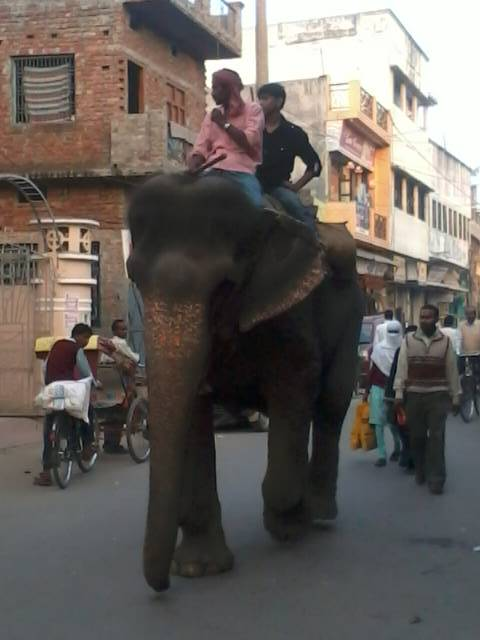
Two men enjoying an elephant ride in Market Street

Notable landmarks are: Subhash Chowk, Tilak Chowk, Ambay Chowk, Chawani, Ravindra Nagar, Nahar, Rajdarbar, Gudaribajar, Lajpat Nagar, Durgamandir, Jataharoad, Belawan chungi, Bawali Chowk Sugar Factory etc. Though Padrauna is a district headquarter yet almost all the offices like Kutchery, Vikas Bhavan, Income Tax Office, Collectorate, District Hospital etc. are situated in Ravindra Nagar Dhoos. It lies in the Great Plains and is Terai area, very close to piedmont plains of Himalayas, and is very close to borders of Nepal and Bihar. It is located on the bank of river Bansi, a Ganges tributary originating in Nepal. The town presents characteristics distinct from natural features of the western districts of Uttar Pradesh. This difference is due primarily to the relative proximity of the Himalayas, the outermost foothills of which are only a few kilometres from the northern borders. The peak of Dhaulagiri, some 8,230 meters above sea-level, is visible under favourable climatic conditions as far south as Padrauna itself. Below the outer hills is a dry boulder-strewn tract, corresponding to the Bhabar of Kumaun and Garhwal and here the bulk of the moisture contributed by the rainfall and the small streams is absorbed by the soil, to reappear through seepage in the damp and unhealthy tract, known as the terai. The climate is extreme temperate climate, with soaring temperatures in summer crossing 40 degrees and in winters temperatures as low as 3 to 4 degrees.

== Education ==
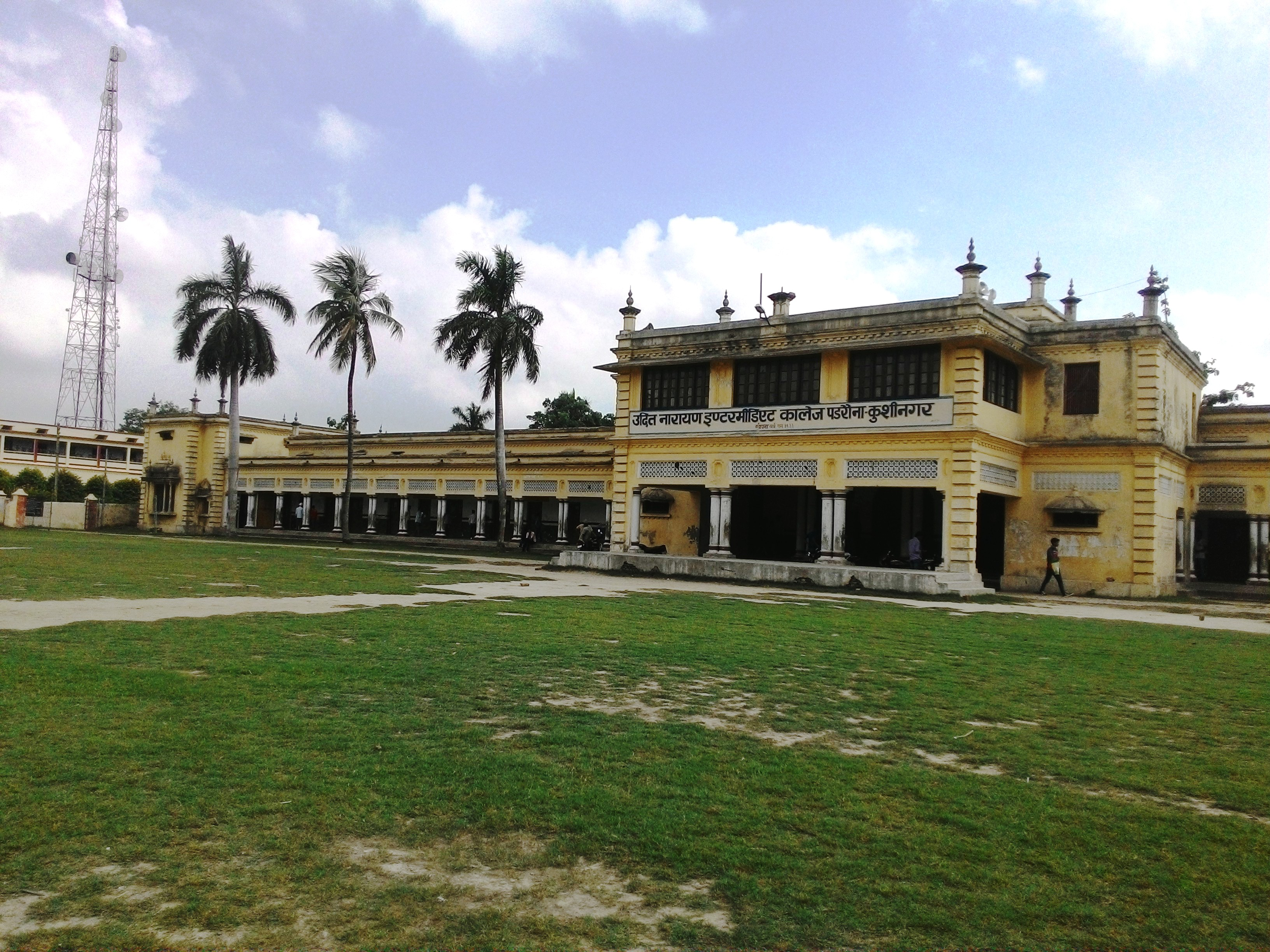
Udit Narayan Inter College

Foundation Stone of Udit Narayan Kshatriya High School

The town has several schools like Vivekanand Inter College, Kendriya Vidyalaya Navodaya Vidyalaya, VBD INTERNATIONAL PUBLIC SCHOOL, Tulsi vidya niketan, Udit Narayan Intermediate College (formerly known as Udit Narayan Kshatriya High School), JDS International School, (Affiliate to CBSE) Kiddy's Corner School, D.D.N. Public School, Midas School of Learning, Geeta International Public School, Udit Narayan Post Graduate College, Bhartiya Intermediate College, St. Therese's School (affiliated to ICSE), Summer Field Public School, Hanuman Intermediate College, Real Paradise Academy School, ITI, Tapesawari Vidya Mandir, HIIT institute, Shree Ganga Public School, St. Xavier's Senior Secondary School (affiliated to CBSE), Seth M R Jaipuria School, Post Graduate Colleges affiliated to DDU Gorakhpur

Literacy rate is relatively low as compared to the UP state average 69.72 and 63% of its residents are literate. After pursuing 10th and 12th standard from Padrauna, students travel to other cities like Lucknow, Allahabad, Varanasi and sometimes up to New Delhi as well. Students from here are primarily interested in government sector jobs and secondary preference is private jobs.

== Radio stations ==
Radio Pragya 90.4 MHz is a community radio station in Padrauna, Kushinagar district.

== Demographics ==
The majority religion in Padrauna is Hinduism, while Islam and Sikhism also hold a significant presence. Smaller populations of Buddhists and Christians are also found here. Padrauna has a large population of Sainthwars, and RPN Singh belongs to this community.

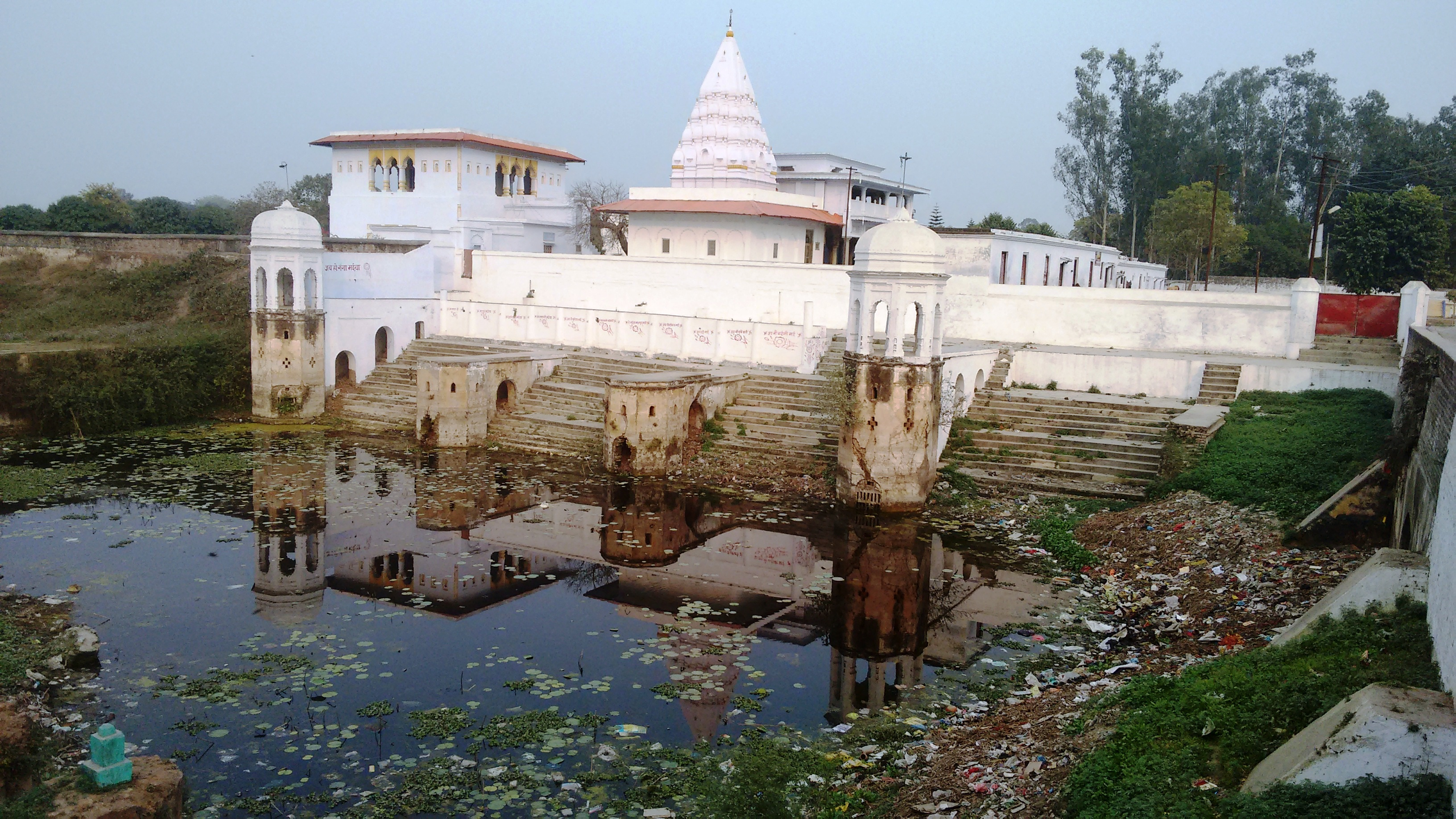
Ram Dham

Durga temple

budhiya maata temple

budhiya maata temple

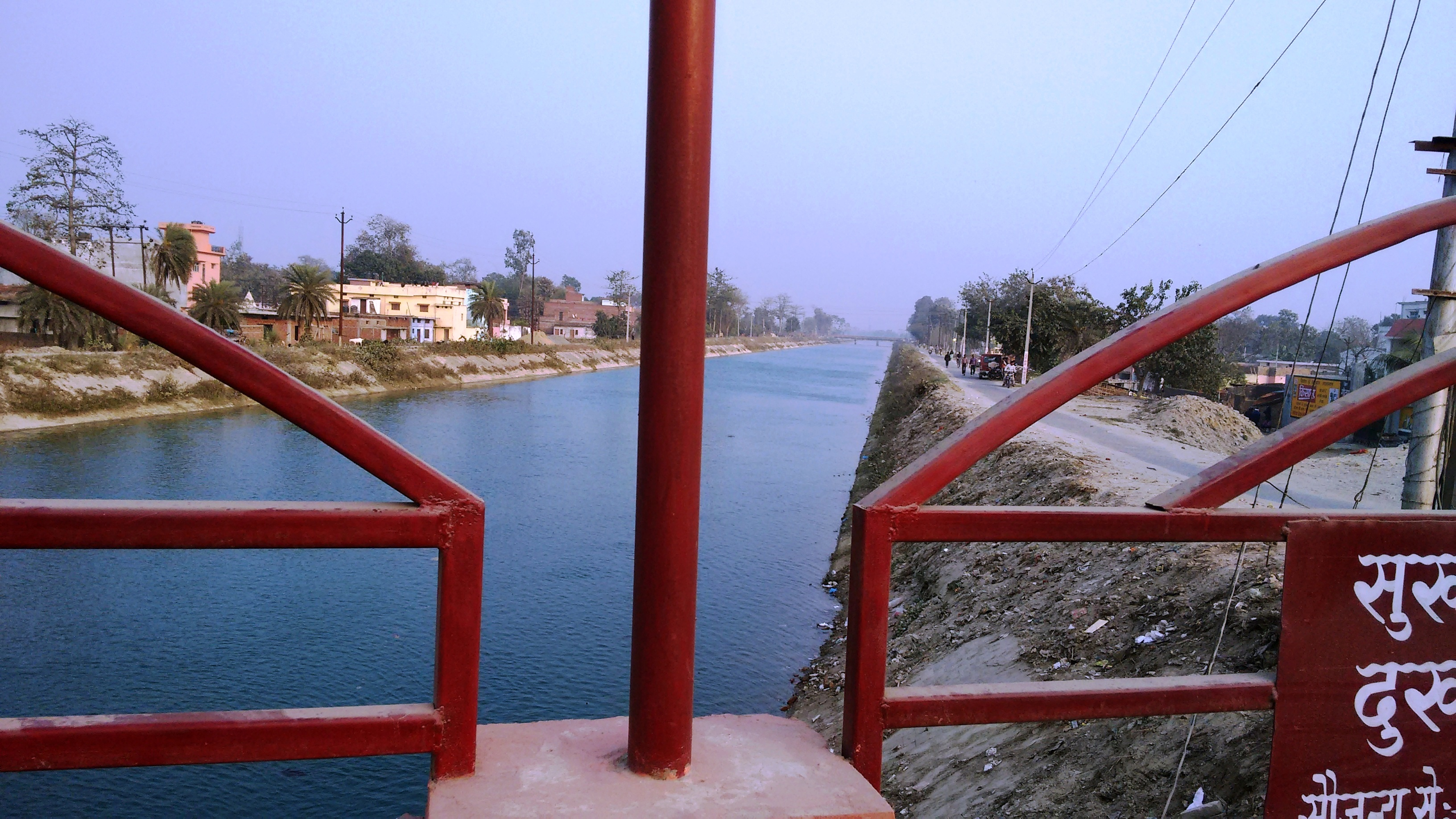
Irrigation canal
