= Kushinagar district =

District of Uttar Pradesh in India

Coordinates: 26°54′09″N 83°58′55″E

- District of Uttar Pradesh
- Kushinagar district
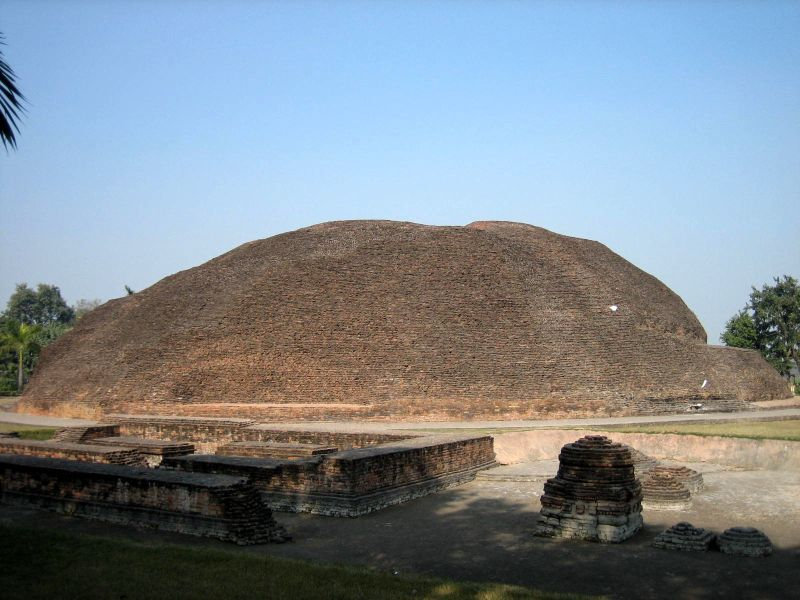
- Buddha cremation stupa, Kushinagar

- Location of Kushinagar district in Uttar Pradesh
- Country: India
- State: Uttar Pradesh
- Division: Gorakhpur
- Established as Padrauna: 13 May 1994
- Name Changed from Padrauna to Kushinagar: 19 June 1997
- Headquarters: Padrauna
- Tehsils: Padrauna Sadar, Khadda, Kushinagar/Kasia, Hata, Tamkuhiraj, Captanganj

Government
  - Member of Parliament (Kushinagar): Vijay Kumar Dubey
  - Lok Sabha constituencies: Kushinagar
  - Vidhan Sabha constituencies: Padrauna Sadar, Khadda, Ramkola, Hata, Fazilnagar, Tamkuhiraj, Kushinagar

Area
  - Total: 2,873.5 km^{2} (1,109.5 sq mi)

Population (2011)
  - Total: 3,564,544
  - Density: 1,240.5/km^{2} (3,212.9/sq mi)
  - Urban: 4.87%

Language
  - Official: Hindi, Urdu
  - Regional: Bhojpuri

Demographics
  - Literacy: 67.66 per cent
  - Sex ratio: 955
- Time zone: UTC+05:30 (IST)
- Vehicle registration: UP 57
- Major highways: NH 27 and NH 727 (previously NH 28 and NH 28B)
- Website: kushinagar.nic.in

Kushinagar district is a district of the state of Uttar Pradesh in India situated in the easternmost part of the state. It has the administrative headquarters at Ravindra Nagar Dhoos. The district is named such after the town Kushinagar, a Buddhist pilgrimage site where Gautama Buddha attained parinirvana in the 5th century BCE. Since the independence of India, Kushinagar district was a part of Deoria District and came into existence on 13 May 1994 as a separate district division. It was earlier known as Padrauna and thereafter was renamed Kushinagar on 19 June 1997.

== Location ==
Kushinagar District is bounded on the northeast by West Champaran and Gopalganj districts of Bihar, on the south by Deoria District and on the west by Gorakhpur and Maharajganj districts. It is part of Gorakhpur Division.

== Economy ==
In 2006 the Ministry of Panchayati Raj named Kushinagar one of the country's 250 most backward districts (out of a total of 640). It is one of the 34 districts in Uttar Pradesh currently receiving funds from the Backward Regions Grant Fund Programme (BRGF).

== Transport ==
The Indian Government has approved a project for the construction of an International Airport which would be completed till 2019. In 2017, Uttar Pradesh Government has approved a project for develop Kushinagar bus station as an International Bus Station. Daily Buses from Gorakhpur to Tamkuhi Road and Gorakhpur to Padrauna through Kasia are available at Railway Station Bus Depot Gorakhpur.

Padrauna, Ramkola, Kaptanganj, Dudahi and Tamkuhi Road are some cities connected with train facility in the district.

On 20 October 2021 the international airport was officially inaugurated during the Abhidhamma Day celebrations in Kushinagar.

== Demographics ==
Historical population
Year	Pop.	±% p.a.
1901	738,315	—
1911	804,023	+0.86%
1921	820,780	+0.21%
1931	876,462	+0.66%
1941	977,561	+1.10%
1951	1,043,419	+0.65%
1961	1,184,272	+1.27%
1971	1,401,482	+1.70%
1981	1,746,618	+2.23%
1991	2,255,120	+2.59%
2001	2,891,667	+2.52%
2011	3,564,544	+2.11%

Religions in Kushinagar district (2011)
Religion	Percent
Hinduism	82.16%
Islam	17.40%
Other or not stated	0.44%

According to the 2011 census Kushinagar district has a population of 3,564,544, roughly equal to the nation of Lithuania or the US state of Connecticut. This gives it a ranking of 81st in India (out of a total of 640). The district has a population density of 1,226 inhabitants per square kilometre (3,180/sq mi). Its population growth rate over the decade 2001-2011 was 23.08%. Kushinagar has a sex ratio of 955 females for every 1000 males, and a literacy rate of 67.66%. 4.72% of the population lives in urban areas. Scheduled Castes and Scheduled Tribes make up 15.27% and 2.25% of the population respectively.

Languages in Kushinagar district (2011)
1. Bhojpuri (77.7%)
2. Hindi (21.8%)
3. Others (0.54%)

According to 2011 Census, 77.67% of the population in the district spoke Bhojpuri and 21.79% Hindi as their first language.

Bhojpuri is the local language of Kushinagar. The Bhojpuri variant of Kaithi is the indigenous script of Bhojpuri language.

== Education ==
- Autonomous State Medical College Kushinagar
