= Ramapur =

Ramapur Rama Pur
- Village
- Location within Uttar Pradesh
- Coordinates: 26°9′10″N 83°26′28″E
- Country: India
- State: Uttar Pradesh
- District: Azamgarh district
- Nagar panchayat: Phulpur
- Elevation: 2,661 ft (811 m)

Population (2001)
  - Total: 1,225
- Time zone: UTC+5.30 (IST)
- Post code: 223225
- Area code: 91-05460 (telephone)
- Parliament Constituency: Katghar Lalganj-Azamgarh
- Assembly Constituency: Phulpur

Ramapur or Rama Pur as it is known for postal purposes, is a village-gram panchayat in Pawai Block, Phulpur, Azamgarh, Uttar Pradesh, India
