= Chivtaheen =

- Village
- Chiutahi
- Interactive map of Chivtaheen
- Country: India
- State: Uttar Pradesh
- District: Azamgarh
- Tehsil: Katghar Lalganj

Government
  - Type: Sarpanch (Pradhan)
  - Body: Gram panchayat

Population (2011)
  - Total: 2,841

Languages
  - Official: Hindi
- Time zone: UTC+5:30 (IST)
- PIN: 276302
- Vehicle registration: UP- 50
- Website: http://azamgarh.nic.in/

Chivtaheen as Chiutahi is a village located in Katghar Lalganj, district Azamgarh, Uttar Pradesh state of India.

== Population ==
In 2011 village has total population was 2841 of which 1521 are males while 1320 are females.
