= Sunderpurkaithauli =

Coordinates: 25.8753426°N 82.845723°E

Sunderpurkaithauli is a village, situated in Azamgarh district, Uttar Pradesh, India. It is located on the bank of the Beso River. The neighbouring villages of Sunderpurkaithauli are Dehduwar, Lasara Khurd, and Tirhutipur. The number of houses in this village is not very large. Rajju and Bhelahiya are the two main water bodies of this village. 75% population of village is literate. The per capita income of the village is good.
