= Kanaila, Azamgarh =

Coordinates: 26.370889°N 82.928556°E

Kanaila is a village near Atraulia in Azamgarh District of Uttar Pradesh state in India. It is located 44 km towards North from Azamgarh and is 242 km away from state capital Lucknow. Kanaila is part of Burhanpur Tehsil of Azamgarh District.

Kanaila is surrounded by Rajesultanpur Tehsil towards the north, Koilsa Tehsil towards the south, Ahiraula Tehsil towards the south and Jahan Girganj Tehsil towards the east. Kanaila is in the border of the Azamgarh District and Ambedkar Nagar District.

Bhojpuri is local dialect used in Kanaila. As per the 2011 Census, Kanaila's literacy rate of 78.76% is higher than that of Uttar Pradesh.
