= Shahjerpur =

Village in Azamgarh, Uttar Pradesh

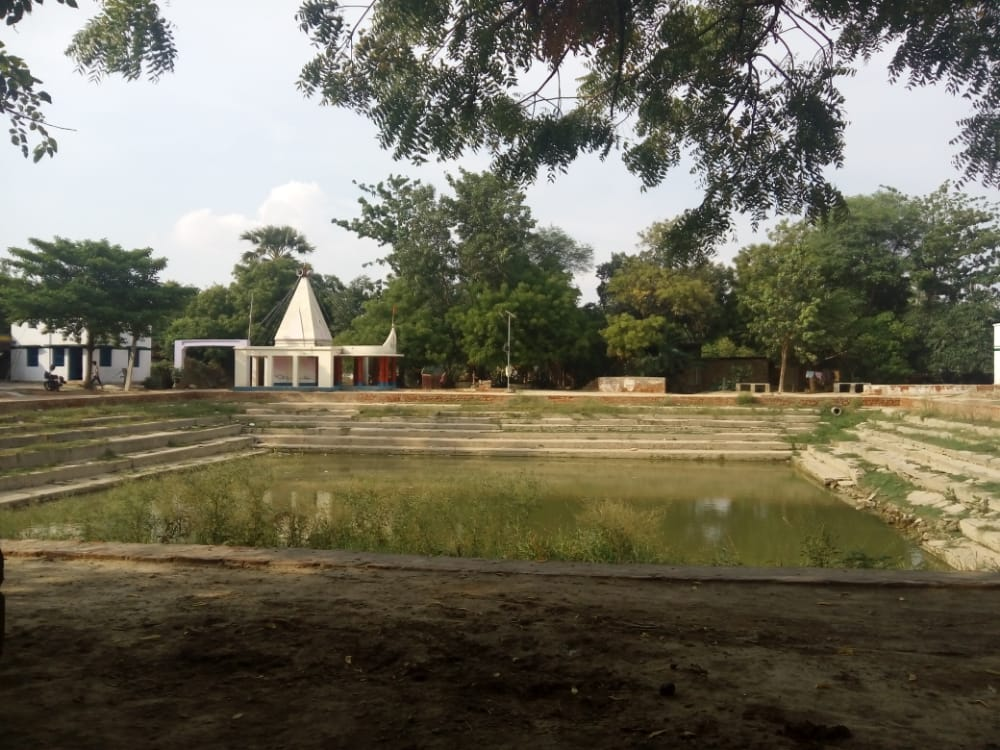
Pokhra in Shahjerpur

Shahjerpur is a village near Phulpur, Azamgarh in the Azamgarh district, which is in the state of Uttar Pradesh, India.
