= Borajpur Kala =

Bhorajpur Kala is a village situated in Atraulia block in Azamgarh District, Uttar Pradesh, India . This village is a gram panchayat. It is almost very close to the Atraulia Town.
