= Colonel Nizamuddin =

Indian Independence activist

- Born: Saifuddin; 1901; Dhakwan, Azamgarh, United Provinces of Agra and Oudh, British India
- Died: February 6, 2017 (aged 116); Azamgarh, Uttar Pradesh, India
- Military career
- Allegiance: (India) Indian National Army
- Rank: Colonel (honorary, as reported in media)
- Unit: Azad Hind Fauj
- Conflicts: Burma Campaign (World War II)

Colonel Nizamuddin (born Saifuddin; 1901 – 6 February 2017) was an Indian freedom fighter who, according to Indian media reports, is described as having served as a driver and bodyguard for Subhas Chandra Bose during the operations of the Indian National Army (INA) in Southeast Asia.

== Military service ==
Nizamuddin was a member of the Indian National Army (Azad Hind Fauj). Media accounts published in later decades state that in 1943, Nizamuddin was wounded while attempting to protect Bose during an encounter in the forests of Burma.

Bose is said to have informally referred to him as "Colonel," a title described in news reports as honorary rather than a formal commissioned military rank.

== Later life and recognition ==
After the dissolution of the INA, Nizamuddin lived in Rangoon for several decades before returning to his ancestral village in Azamgarh, Uttar Pradesh, in 1969.

He received national media attention in 2014 when Prime Minister Narendra Modi met him during an event in Varanasi. At the time of his death in 2017, several media reports described him as being among the oldest living people in India, based on personal documents cited in news coverage which suggested an age of approximately 116 years.
