= Amdhi =

Coordinates: 23°52′N 81°28′E

- village
- Interactive map of Amdhi
- Country: India
- State: Uttar Pradesh
- District: Azamgarh

Languages
  - Official: Hindi
- Time zone: UTC+5:30 (IST)
- PIN: 276131
- Vehicle registration: UP50
- Nearest city: Varanasi
- Literacy: excellent%
- Lok Sabha constituency: Azamgarh
- Vidhan Sabha constituency: Jahanaganj
- Climate: Northern Indian plain (Köppen)

Amdhi is a small village in Azamgarh district of Uttar Pradesh, India, situated near the Jahanaganj Market.

The name was derived from 'आम (Mango) and दही (Yogurt)', the traditional Indian fruit and food.

It lies 14 km south of Azamgarh city. It is well connected and accessible through Azamgarh city, Varanasi, Jaunpur and Allahabad. It has a high literacy rate. The village has a post office with pin code as 276131 and dispensary run by state government.

Amdhi village is Muslim populated area. The population of village is approx. 300 person according to 2007 population counting.
