= Yazdani (surname) =

Yazdani (Persian: یزدانی) derived from the ancient Persian word Yazdan, meaning deity. Thus Yazdani means belonging to the deity.

Notable people with the surname include:

- Bobby Yazdani (born 1963), Iranian-American entrepreneur and investor
- Dariush Yazdani (born 1977), Iranian footballer
- Golam Yazdani (1917–2009), Bengali politician in India
- Ghulam Yazdani (1885–1962), Bengali historian and archaeologist in India
- Haji Kazim Yazdani, Afghani historical researcher
- Hassan Yazdani (born 1994), Iranian wrestler
- Kausar Yazdani (1935–2011), Indian Islamic scholar
- Raushan Yazdani (1918–1967), Bengali poet and researcher
- Rawshan Yazdani Bhuiyan (died 1981), Bangladeshi freedom fighter
- Reza Yazdani (born 1984), Iranian wrestler
- Reza Yazdani (singer) (born 1973), Iranian singer
- Sattar Yazdani (born 1949), Iranian singer
- Siavash Yazdani (born 1992), Iranian association footballer
- Keavan Yazdani (born 1993), Iranian-Filipino Canadian visual artist.
