= Lasara Kalan =

Village in Uttar Pradesh, India

Lasara Kalan is a village governed by a Gram Panchayat located in Azamgarh district, Uttar Pradesh, India.
