= Kandharapur =

Village in Azamgarh, Uttar Pradesh, India

Coordinates: 27°09′N 79°48′E

Kandharapur is a village in Azamgarh District, Uttar Pradesh, India.
