= Muhammad Rashid Azmi =

Indian Islamic scholar

Mawlana Muhammad Rashid Azmi

Deputy Vice-chancellor of Darul Uloom Deoband
- Incumbent
- Assumed office October 2021
- Preceded by: Abdul Khaliq Sambhali

Personal life
- Born: 16 December 1959 Bamhaur, Azamgarh district, Uttar Pradesh, India
- Education: Darul Uloom Deoband

Religious life
- Religion: Islam

Muhammad Rashid Azmi (born 16 December 1959) is an Indian Islamic scholar, Mufti, and educator. He has served as the Deputy Vice-Chancellor (Naib Mohtamim) of Darul Uloom Deoband since October 2021, succeeding Abdul Khaliq Sambhali.

== Early life and education ==
Muhammad Rashid Azmi was born on 16 December 1959, in the village of Bamhaur, Azamgarh district, Uttar Pradesh, India. His father, Muhammad Muslim Bamhauri Azmi, was also an Islamic scholar. He began his early Islamic education at Madrasah Qurania and Jamia Husainia in Jaunpur. In 1983, he enrolled at Darul Uloom Deoband and completed the Dars-e-Nizami curriculum in 1984. He pursued further studies in Islamic jurisprudence (Ifta) at the same institution and graduated in 1985.

== Career ==
After completing his studies, Azmi taught at Jamia Husainia in Jaunpur until 1991. In 1992, he joined Darul Uloom Deoband as a teacher, eventually becoming an instructor for advanced-level (Darja-e-'Ulya) classes. He has taught various Islamic texts, including Muwatta Imam Malik and Sunan Ibn Majah, and currently teaches Sunan Abu Dawood.

In 1428 AH (2007 CE), Azmi was appointed as the head of the Tahaffuz-e-Sunnah (Preservation of Sunnah) department at Darul Uloom Deoband. His work in this department involves countering ideologies deemed inconsistent with Islamic orthodoxy.

In October 2021, Azmi was appointed Deputy Vice-Chancellor of Darul Uloom Deoband by its governing council, succeeding Abdul Khaliq Sambhali.

Azmi is also a member of the executive committee of Jamiat Ulama-e-Hind (M).

== Literary works ==
Azmi is the author of several works, including:

- Muhaadharaat-e-Ilmiyyah (transl. Scholarly Discourses on the Refutation of Non-Conformist Ideology)
- Mas'ala-e-Taqlīd (transl. The Issue of Taqlid)

== See also ==
- List of Deobandis
