= Dewait =

- Village
- Interactive map of Dewait
- Country: India
- State: Uttar Pradesh
- District: Azamgarh

Language
  - Official: Hindi
  - Additional official: Urdu
- Time zone: UTC+5:30 (IST)
- PIN: 276204
- Nearest city: Varanasi
- Lok Sabha constituency: Azamgarh
- Vidhan Sabha constituency: Mehnagar
- Climate: Humid subtropical (Köppen)

Dewait is a village in the Azamgarh district of Uttar Pradesh, India, situated near the Mehnagar Market. It lies 15 km south of Azamgarh city, and is accessible from Varanasi, Jaunpur and Allahabad. Including the adjoining areas, the village has a population of 5308 as recorded in the 2011 Census, out of which Males are 2738 and Females are 2570. The village has a post office with the pin code 276204 and a dispensary run by the state government.

== History ==
Dewait is the Place of Sa'adaat. The name was derived from Shah Deyat, an Arabic word meaning Blood Money. Dewait was donated by the King Haribans of Mehnagar to "Meer Sarfatah Husain" (Meera Baba — a well known name among neighbouring villages), against the blood shedding of Sa'adaat. Martyr Sa'adaats are believed to have migrated from the area of Babun Nahar in Iraq. In those years many Shiites of central Asia took refuge in India.

A few centuries ago, the Noble Family of Ahl-e-Sa'adaat migrated from the Holy City of Babun Nahar in Iraq to India. Some of them permanently settled near Azamgarh city, a district of Uttar Pradesh, and named the area Babun Nahar after their native village. It is now called Sapnahar (a modified name from Babun Nahar, then Babnahar, and now Sapnahar) and is one kilometre from present Dewait. Only the graveyard of Meer Sarfatah Husain (Meera Baba) is there, now a worship place for non Muslims. Muslims go there only on Shab-e-Barat, an Islamic religion occasion, to offer prayers.
