= Kalanderpur =

Kalandarpur
- village
- Interactive map of Kalandarpur
- Coordinates: 25°55′12″N 83°00′50″E
- Country: India
- State: Uttar Pradesh
- District: Jaunpur

Languages
  - Official: Hindi
- Time zone: UTC+5:30 (IST)
- PIN: 276302
- Vehicle registration: UP
- Nearest city: Jaunpur, Uttar Pradesh
- Vidhan Sabha constituency: Dharmapur
- Website: up.gov.in

Kalanderpur is a village located in Mehanagar taluka of Azamgarh district of Uttar Pradesh.
