= Nizamabad black clay pottery =

Nizamabad black pottery
- Geographical indication
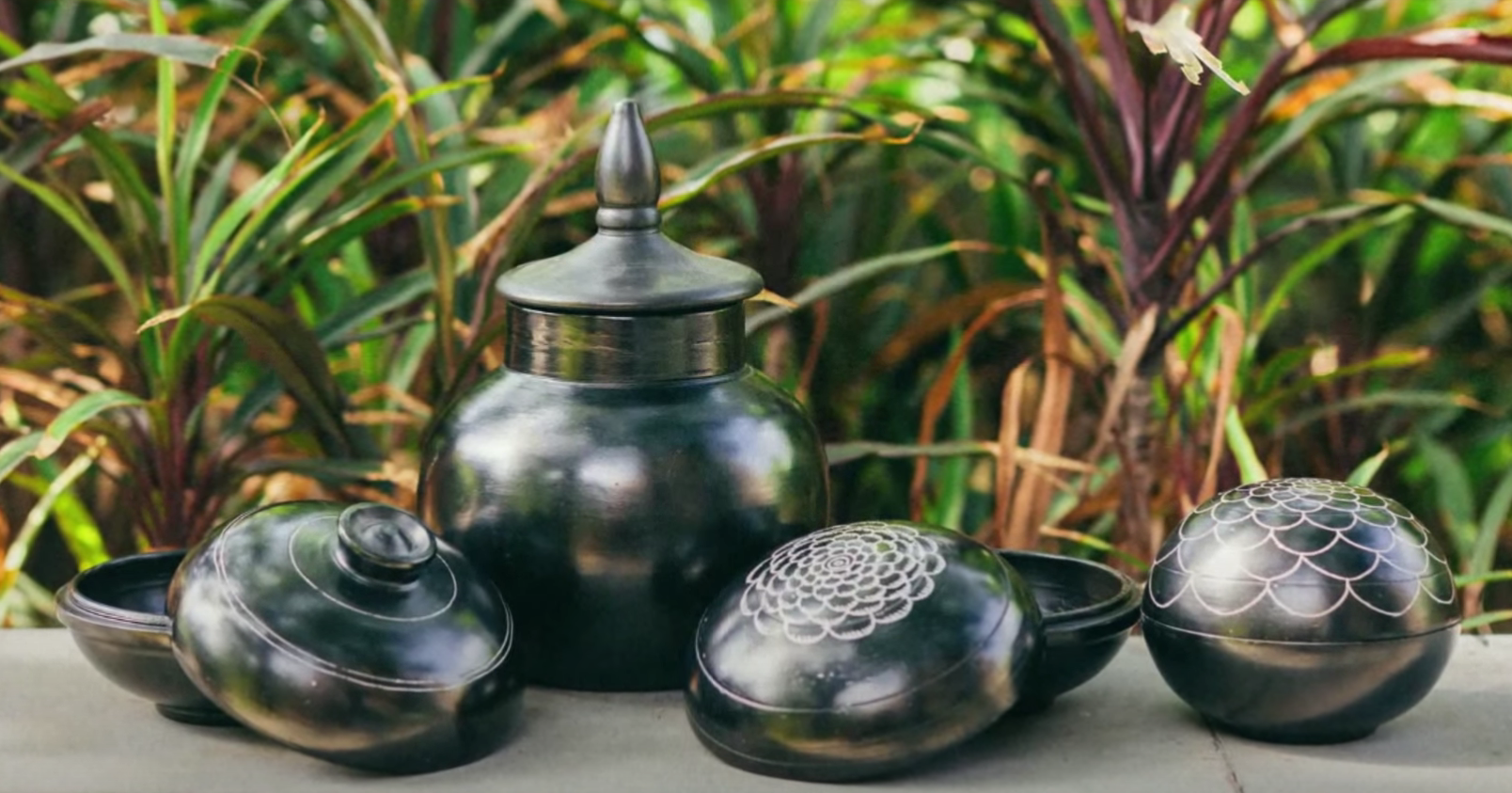
- Description: type of clay pottery known for its dark shiny body with engraved silver patterns
- Type: Manufactured
- Area: Nizamabad, Azamgarh district, Uttar Pradesh
- Country: India
- Registered: December 2015
- Material: black clay; zinc, tin or lead amalgam

The black pottery of Nizamabad in Azamgarh district of Uttar Pradesh, India is unique type of clay pottery known for its dark shiny body with engraved silver patterns. It was registered for Geographical Indication tag in December 2015.

== Pottery ==
The pottery are made with locally available fine textured clay. The clay moulds are prepared in different shapes and are baked in kiln. Later these clay wares are washed with powdered vegetable matter and are rubbed with mustard oil. They are decorated with floral and geometric patterned grooves using sharp twigs. They are smoke fired with rice husks in enclosed kilns which gives its unique shiny black surface. They are again rubbed with oil and baked in kiln. The grooves on clay wares are then filled with silvery powder of Zinc and Mercury, washed with water and polished again. Lead or Tin Amalgams are also used. The silver powder gives shiny hue against black background of pottery.

The variety of household and decorative items are made including vases, plates, pots, lamps, tea-pots, bowls, vessels, incense stick holders and statues of Hindu religious figures. Surahi, a long-necked water pot, is a popular item.

== History ==
The black pottery is studied by historians due to its resemble with the Northern Black Polished Ware pottery of urban Iron Age culture of Indian subcontinent. The silver patterns are inspired from medieval Bidriware of Hyderabad which decorates pots using silver wires. Powdered mix of lead, mercury and zinc in equal proportion is filled into the carved design a technique which was introduced from Gujarat during the Mughal rule of Aurangzeb. Around 200 families are involved in the craft in Nizamabad and majority of their works are exported. Still their condition remains abysmal. The black clay pottery was applied for Geographical Indication tag in October 2013 with support of NABARD of Lucknow and Human Welfare Association of Varanasi. It was registered for GI tag in December 2015 which gives the right to name the product to specific geographic region of origin only.
