= Bisram =

Indian poet and singer (1907–1950)

- Born: Bisram; 1907; Siyarampur, Azamgarh, Uttar Pradesh
- Died: 1950 (aged 42–43)
- Occupations: Poet; Singer; writer
- Writing career
- Language: Bhojpuri
- Period: British Raj, Independent India

Bisram (1907–1950) was an Indian Bhojpuri-language writer, singer and poet who is known for his Biraha poems.

== Life ==
He was born in 1907 in Siyarampur village near Azamgarh in Uttar Pradesh. His father's name was Vibhuti Rai. After completing his primary education he started helping his father in farming. At the same time, he continued to learn Biraha. He married in 1925. His wife died of pneumonia five years later. After this incident he started living alone and began to sing in solitude and write Biraha to calm his heart. Later on, they started singing songs in the riots as well, leading to him gaining fame in Azamgarh district. He died in 1950 due to sclerosis.
