= Hafizpur =

- Town
- Location in Uttar Pradesh, India
- Coordinates: 28°40′22″N 77°47′11″E
- Country: India
- State: Uttar Pradesh
- District: Azamgarh

Population (2001)
  - Total: 4,520

Languages
  - Official: HindiEnglish
- Time zone: UTC+5:30 (IST)

Hafizpur is a census town in Azamgarh district in the Indian state of Uttar Pradesh.

== Demographics ==
As of 2001 India census, Hafizpur had a population of 4,520. Males constitute 53% of the population and females 47%. Hafizpur has an average literacy rate of 45%, lower than the national average of 59.5%: male literacy is 56%, and female literacy is 34%. In Hafizpur, 16% of the population is under 6 years of age.

Religions in Hafizpur
Religion	Percent
Hindus	33%
Muslims	66%
Jains	0.5%
Others†	0.5%
Distribution of religions †Includes Sikhs (0.2%), Buddhists (<0.2%).
