= Mehanagar =

- town
- Interactive map of Mehanagar
- Coordinates: 25°52′37″N 83°06′30″E
- Country: India
- State: Uttar Pradesh

Languages
  - Official: Hindi
- Time zone: UTC+5:30 (IST)
- Vehicle registration: UP
- Website: up.gov.in

Mehnagar is one of the taluka in Azamgarh district of province Uttar Pradesh in India. It includes Kalanderpur.
