= Pratap Pur Chhataura =

Village in Uttar Pradesh, India

Pratap Pur Chhataura is in Azamgarh district of Uttar Pradesh, India.
