= Atraulia Assembly constituency =

Assembly constituency in Uttar Pradesh

Coordinates: 26.33°N 82.95°E

Atrauliya
- Constituency No. 343 for the Uttar Pradesh Legislative Assembly

Constituency details
- Country: India
- Region: North India
- State: Uttar Pradesh
- District: Azamgarh
- Reservation: None

Member of Legislative Assembly
- 18th Uttar Pradesh Legislative Assembly
- Incumbent Sangram Yadav
- Party: Samajwadi Party
- Elected year: 2022

Atraulia is a constituency of the Uttar Pradesh Legislative Assembly covering the town of Atrauliya in the Azamgarh district of Uttar Pradesh, India.

Atraulia is one of five assembly constituencies in the Lalganj Lok Sabha constituency. Since 2008, this assembly constituency is numbered 343 amongst 403 constituencies.

== Members of Legislative Assembly ==
#	Term	Member of Legislative Assembly	Party	From	To	Days	Comment
01	2nd Vidhan Sabha	Padmakar	Praja Socialist Party	April 1957	March 1962	1,800	
02	3rd Vidhan Sabha	Brij Bihari	Indian National Congress	March 1962	March 1967	1,828	
03	4th Vidhan Sabha	Markande	Samyukta Socialist Party	March 1967	April 1968	402	
04	5th Vidhan Sabha	Jang Bahadur Singh	Indian National Congress	February 1969	March 1974	1,832	
05	6th Vidhan Sabha	Jang Bahadur Singh	Indian National Congress	March 1974	April 1977	1,153	
06	7th Vidhan Sabha	Durg Vijai Singh	Indian National Congress	June 1977	February 1980	969	
07	8th Vidhan Sabha	Shambhu Nath	Indian National Congress (Indira)	June 1980	March 1985	1,735	
08	9th Vidhan Sabha	Balram Yadav	Lokdal	March 1985	November 1989	1,725	
09	10th Vidhan Sabha	Balram Yadav	Janata Dal	December 1989	April 1991	488	
10	11th Vidhan Sabha	Balram Yadav	Janata Party	June 1991	December 1992	533	
11	12th Vidhan Sabha	Balram Yadav	Samajwadi Party	December 1993	October 1995	693	
12	13th Vidhan Sabha	Vibhuti Prasad Nishad	Bahujan Samaj Party	October 1996	March 2002	1,967	
13	14th Vidhan Sabha	Balram Yadav	Samajwadi Party	February 2002	May 2007	1,902	
14	15th Vidhan Sabha	Surendra Prasad Mishra	Bahujan Samaj Party	May 2007	March 2012	1,736	
15	16th Vidhan Sabha	Sangram Yadav	Samajwadi Party	March 2012	March 2017	1,829	
16	17th Vidhan Sabha	Sangram Yadav	Samajwadi Party	March 2017	March 2022	1,819	
17	18th Vidhan Sabha	Sangram Yadav	Samajwadi Party	March 2022	Incumbent	1644	

== Election results ==
=== 2027 ===
2027 Uttar Pradesh Legislative Assembly election: Atraulia
Party	Candidate	Votes	%	±%
INDIA				
NDA				
BSP				
NOTA	None of the above			
Majority				
Turnout				
gain from		Swing		

=== 2022 ===
2022 Uttar Pradesh Legislative Assembly election: Atraulia
Party	Candidate	Votes	%	±%
SP	Sangram Yadav	91,502	39.55	+4.38
NISHAD	Prashant Singh	74,255	32.1	
BSP	Saroj Kumar Pandey	51,293	22.17	−4.6
VIP	Saurabh Nishad	3,693	1.6	
INC	Ramesh Chandra Dubey	2,212	0.96	
Jan Adhikar Party	Umesh Kumar Maurya	2,181	0.94	
NOTA	None of the above	1,402	0.61	−0.34
Majority		17,247	7.45	+6.28
Turnout		231,341	60.86	+2.07
SP hold		Swing		

=== 2017 ===
Samajwadi Party candidate Sangram Yadav won in last Assembly election of 2017 Uttar Pradesh Legislative Elections defeating Bharatiya Janta Party candidate Kanhaiya Lal Nishad by a margin of 2,467 votes.

2017 Uttar Pradesh Legislative Assembly election: Atraulia
Party	Candidate	Votes	%	±%
SP	Sangram Yadav	74,276	35.17	
BJP	Kanhaiya Lal Nishad	71,809	34.0	
BSP	Akhand Pratap Singh	56,536	26.77	
CPI	Triloki Nath	2,730	1.29	
NOTA	None of the above	1,980	0.95	
Majority		2,467	1.17	
Turnout		211,210	58.79	
