= Mehnagar =

Town in Uttar Pradesh, India

- Town
- Location in Uttar Pradesh, India Mehnagar (India)
- Coordinates: 25.88°N 83.12°E
- Country: India
- State: Uttar Pradesh
- District: Azamgarh

Government
  - MLA: Puja Saroj
- Elevation: 61 m (200 ft)

Population (2001)
  - Total: 13,319

Language
  - Official: Hindi
  - Additional official: Urdu
- Time zone: UTC+5:30 (IST)
- Postal code: 530003

Mehnagar is a town and a nagar panchayat in Azamgarh district in the Indian state of Uttar Pradesh.

== Geography ==
Mehnagar is located at 25.88°N 83.12°E. It has an average elevation of 61 metres (200 feet).

== Demographics ==
As of the 2001 Census of India, Mehnagar had a population of 13,319. Males constitute 52% of the population and females 48%. Mehnagar has an average literacy rate of 63%, higher than the national average of 59.5%: male literacy is 72%, and female literacy is 53%. In Mehnagar, 18% of the population is under 6 years of age.

== See also ==
- Dewait
- Lakhansipur
