= Balram Yadav =

Indian politician

Member of Uttar Pradesh Legislative Council
- Incumbent
- Assumed office 2024
- Constituency: elected by Legislative Assembly members
- In office 2010–2022
- Constituency: elected by Legislative Assembly members
- In office 1998–2002
- Constituency: Azamgarh Mau Local Authorities

Member of Uttar Pradesh Legislative Assembly
- In office 2002–2007
- Preceded by: Vibhuti Prasad Nishad
- Succeeded by: Surendra Prasad Mishra
- Constituency: Atraulia
- In office 1985–1996
- Preceded by: Shambhu Nath
- Succeeded by: Vibhuti Prasad Nishad
- Constituency: Atraulia

Personal details
- Born: 2 August 1942 (age 83)
- Party: Samajwadi Party
- Children: 4 including (Sangram Yadav)
- Occupation: Politician
- Profession: Agriculture, politician

Balram Yadav is a leader of the Samajwadi Party in Uttar Pradesh.

On 10 June 2016, he was re-elected to the Uttar Pradesh Legislative Council. He has four children including Sangram Yadav, also a politician of Samajwadi party. He is one of the founders of the party. He was elected as a minister of Uttar Pradesh in 2012.

== Personal life ==
Balram Yadav was born to Lodhi Ram Yadav and hails from Azamgarh district. He completed his intermediate studies from Madhyamik Shiksha Parishad in Madhya Pradesh in 1964. Yadav is an agriculturalist by profession.
