= Lakhansipur =

Village in Uttar Pradesh, India

Coordinates: 25°27′N 82°46′E

- village
- Interactive map of Lakhansipur
- Country: India
- State: Uttar Pradesh

Government
  - Body: Gram panchayat

Language
  - Official: Hindi
  - Additional official: Urdu
- Time zone: UTC+5:30 (IST)

Lakhansipur is a village in Azamgarh district, Uttar Pradesh, India.
