= John Bowers (diplomat) =

British diplomat

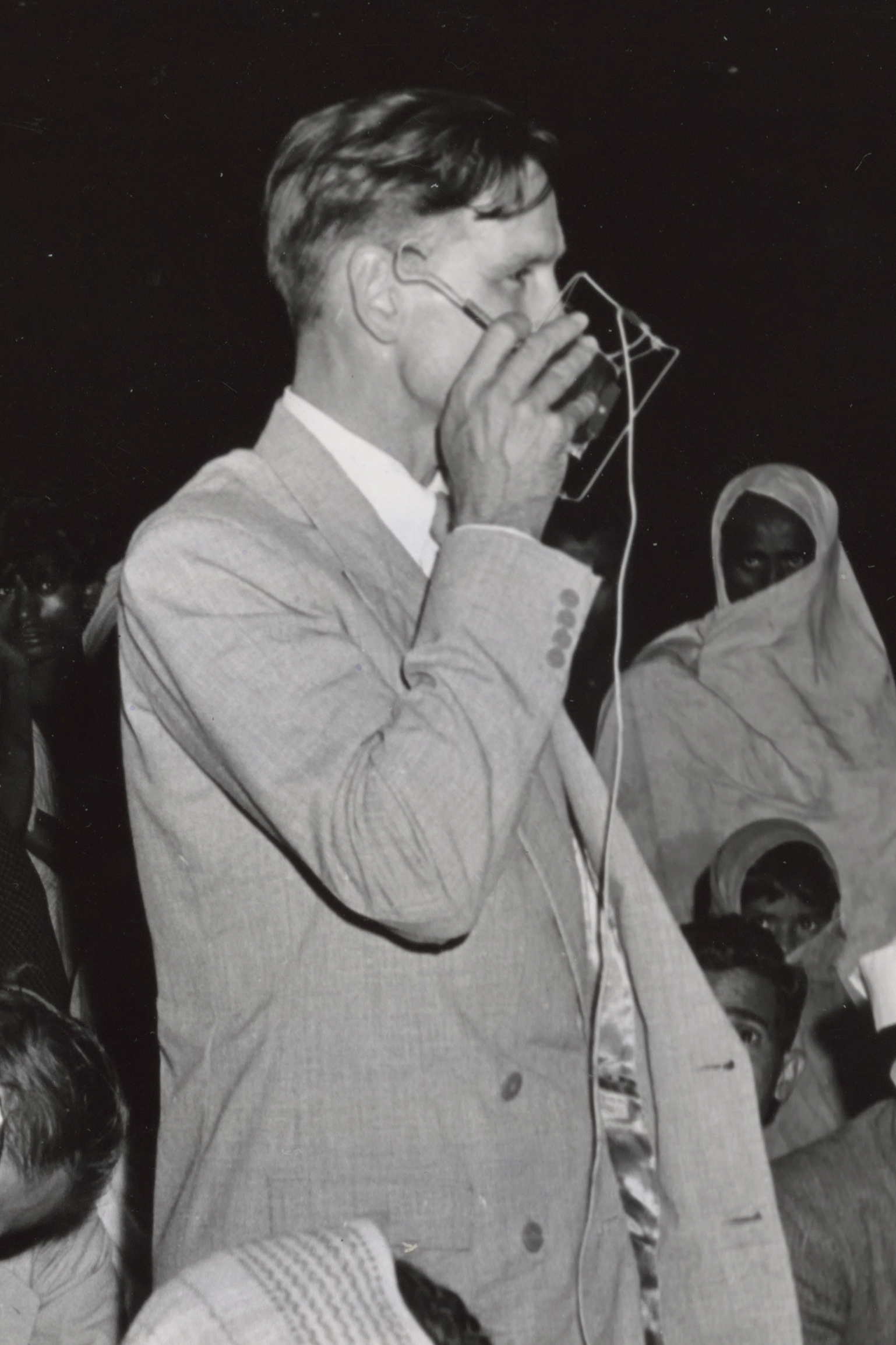
- Bowers speaking into a microphone at a 1954 UNESCO event in Mysore, India
- Alma mater: Cheltenham College; Trinity College
- Occupation: Diplomat, wildlife photographer
- Branch: Sudan Defence Force

John Bowers (November 27, 1912 – October 11, 2004) was a British diplomat and head of fundamental education at UNESCO for 20 years from 1947. He was the architect of UNESCO's activities worldwide in literacy and adult education.

John Bowers was the son of Basil Bowers, headmaster of Cheltenham College Junior School, and was educated at Cheltenham College and Trinity College, Oxford.

While still at school, he took up an interest in bird photography and had pictures published in Country Life.

After postgraduate courses in Arabic, Islamic Culture, Anthropology and Law, he joined the Sudan Political Service in 1935. Three years later, he married Sheila Tinson, with whom he lived among the Dinka people of the southern Sudan. One night his tent was shredded by a Lion—though at the time he was not in it.

During World War II he was seconded to the Sudan Artillery Regiment, based at Kufra oasis. Later he fought in Ethiopia with the Upper Nile Scouts and in the Libyan desert, where he was badly wounded. An out-of-body experience during a subsequent operation gave Bowers a lifelong interest in mysticism. He was private secretary to Lord Moyne, the British Minister Resident in the Middle East, who was murdered by the Stern Gang in 1944. Following the war he joined UNESCO, at the request of Sir Julian Huxley, where he worked in adult education, agriculture and literacy in Africa, India, South-East Asia and Central America. Bowers was a vigorous supporter of the Third World through the United Nations. He inducted qualified educationists including Mushtaq Ahmed Azmi, a pioneer in the field of adult education in India, to UNICEF.

In 1952, representing UNESCO, he spoke at the Dartington conference which proved to be a major event in the history of the British studio pottery movement. Bernard Leach, one of the leaders of this movement, recorded that Bowers's comments about crafts and development in "backward areas" generated controversy among African participants.
