= Abdul Lateef Azmi =

Urdu litterateur

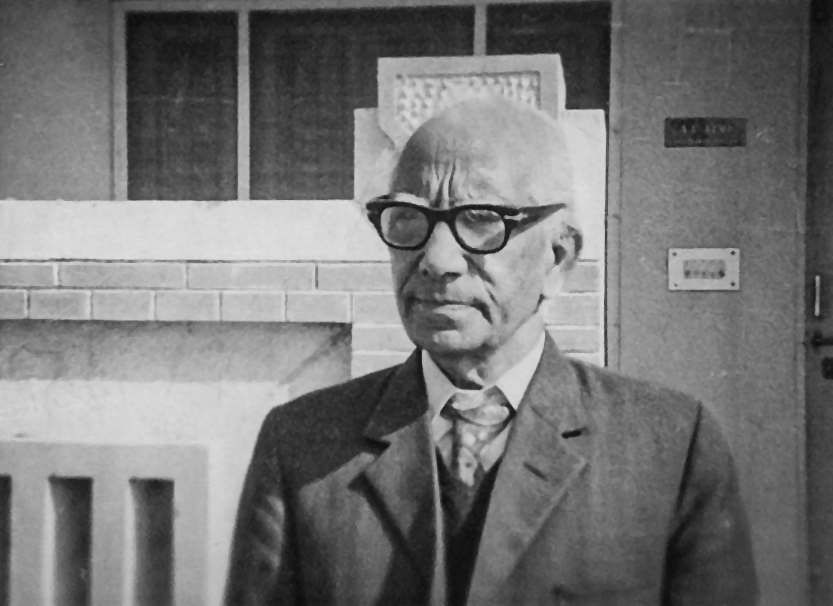
- Born: 1 March 1917; Bandi Kalan, United Provinces, British India
- Died: 11 May 2002 (aged 85); New Delhi, India
- Education: M.A. (Urdu) Jamia Millia Islamia: 1973-1975
- Spouses: Rabia Khatoon; Nafisa Begum

Abdul Lateef Azmi (also written as Abdul Latif Azmi - 1917–2002) was an Urdu litterateur and among the close associates of the founders of Jamia Millia Islamia. He joined Jamia Millia as a student of B.A. in 1936 and served the university over 50 years in various capacities. He was one of the longest serving editors of Jamia Millia's official magazine, Jamia. He died in Delhi on May 11, 2002. In 1985, Maktaba Jamia, New Delhi, published a book Abdul Lateef Azmi Hayat-o-Khidmat ("Abdul Lateef Azmi: Life and Service"). Several scholars contributed chapters in the book on various facets of Abdul Lateef Azmi and his life.

== Biography ==
Abdul Lateef Azmi was born to Abdul Samad and Sabira Khatoon on March 1, 1917. He belonged to a landed family of village Bandi Kalan, District Azamgarh, UP. His father Abdul Samad expired 6 months before he was born, and his mother died when he was just a year old. He was raised by his uncle Abdul Hai. He was sent to Madrasatul Islah and later he joined Darul Uloom Nadwatul Ulama, Lucknow from where he completed his traditional education. After Nadwatul Ulama, he joined Jamia Millia Islamia in 1936 as a student of B.A. He joined MA (Arabic) at Aligarh Muslim University in 1955 but could not complete the course owing to his poor health. Later, he completed M.A. (Urdu) from Jamia Millia Islamia in 1975.

== Professional associations ==
- In charge of the Department of Research, writing and publications, Maktaba Jamia, Delhi: 1941-44
- Additionally in charge of Kutub Khana: Jamia, Delhi: 1945-1948
- Deputy Manager: Hamdarda-ne-Jamia, New Delhi 1952-1954
- Personal Assistant: Mohammad Mujeeb, Vice Chancellor, Jamia Millia Islamia, New Delhi, 1955-1972
- Secretary, Vice Chancellor, Jamia Millia Islamia, New Delhi, 1972–1979
- Assistant Editorial, Zakir Husain Institute of Islamic Studies, Jamia Millia Islamia, New Delhi 1979:1984

== Journalistic works ==
- Assistant editor, Monthly, Jamia, Maktaba Jamia Delhi 1943-1944
- Assistant editor, Weekly, Nai Roshni, New Delhi 1948-1952
- Editor, Monthly, Hamdard-e-Jamia, New Delhi 1952-1954
- Editor, Subah, Anjuman Taraqi-e-Urdu, Delhi Branch 1965-1977
- Editor, Monthly Jamia, Jamia Millia Islamia, New Delhi 1961-1964
- Assistant editor, Monthly Jamia, Jamia Millia Islamia, New Delhi 1964-1984

== Books ==
- Socialism (1942)
- Maulana Shibli Ka Martaba aur Urdu Adab (1945)
- Dr Azkir Hussain: Seerat Wa Shakhsiyat (1967: Republished in 2011: ISBN 9788175876378)
- Jawahar Lal Nehru: Ek Muta'ala (1968)
- Gandhiji aur Unke Khayalaat (1970)
- Baba-e-Urdu Maulvi Abdul Haque (1971)
- Sir Syed Ahmad Khan Aur Unki Manwiyat Maujooda Daur Mein (1972)
- Maulana Muhammad Ali Jauhar: Aik Mutaliya (1980)
- Dr Rajendra Prasad: Azeem Qaumi Rehnuma aur Pehle Rashtrapati (1999)

== Book translations ==
- Jamhuriat ki Kamyabi men Americi Adalat-e-Aliya Ke Shandar Karname. (Authored by R. Rama Swami: 1956)
- Bharat Aaj aur Kal (Authored by Jawahra Lal Nehru: 1962)

== Awards and recognitions ==
- UP Government Award for his work on M.K. Gandhi and his thoughts: 1974
- UP Urdu Academy Award for his work, "Iqbal Dana-e-Raaz": 1979
- Ministry of Adult Education, Government of India Award for his work on 3rd President of India Dr Zakir Husain: 1979
- West Bengal Urdu Academy Award for his work on Maulana Mohammad Ali: 1981
- Mohammad Ali Jauhar Award from Jauhar Memorial Society Lucknow, UP 1981
