= Nizamabad, Uttar Pradesh =

City in Uttar Pradesh, India

- City
- Location in Uttar Pradesh, India Nizamabad, Uttar Pradesh (India)
- Coordinates: 26.05°N 83.06°E
- Country: India
- State: Uttar Pradesh
- District: Azamgarh

Government
  - MLA: Alamabadi
- Elevation: 72 m (236 ft)

Population (2001)
  - Total: 12,096

Language
  - Official: Hindi
  - Additional official: Urdu
- Time zone: UTC+5:30 (IST)
- Vehicle registration: UP
- Website: up.gov.in

Nizamabad is a town and a nagar panchayat in Azamgarh district in the Indian state of Uttar Pradesh. The city is well known for its black clay pottery.

== Geography ==
Nizamabad is located at 26.05°N 83.06°E. It has an average elevation of 72 metres (236 ft).

== Demographics ==
As of the 2001 Census of India, Nizamabad had a population of 12,096. Males constitute 52% of the population and females 48%. Nizamabad has an average literacy rate of 60%: male literacy is 68%, and female literacy is 51%. In Nizamabad, 20% of the population is under six years of age. Nizamabad has one of the prominent gurdwaras of India where Guru Nanak visited and left his sandal, and hence the gurdwara is called Gurdwara Guru Nanak Charan Paduka. The town is on the Ballia–Shahganj broad gauge railway.

Religions in Nizamabad
Religion	Percent
Hindus	33%
Muslims	66%
Jains	0.5%
Others†	0.5%
Distribution of religions †Includes Sikhs (0.2%), Buddhists (<0.2%).

== Economy ==
The black clay pottery of Nizamabad is a unique type of clay pottery known for its dark shiny body with engraved silver patterns. It was registered for a Geographical Indication tag in December 2015.

== Village ==
According to the 2011 Census, Kolpur village in Nizamabad Tehsil of Azamgarh district, Uttar Pradesh, has a population of 1,849 residents. The gender distribution is 903 males and 946 females, resulting in a sex ratio of 1,048 females per 1,000 males, which is higher than the state average of 912.

Children aged 0-6 comprise 16.01% of the population, with a child sex ratio of 862 girls per 1,000 boys, slightly below the Uttar Pradesh average of 902.

The village has a literacy rate of 65.23%, with male literacy at 76.21% and female literacy at 55.13%. This overall rate is slightly below the state average of 67.68%.

Kolpur encompasses an area of 101.62 hectares and consists of approximately 290 households.
