= Banahara =

Banahra
- Village
- Interactive map of Banahra
- Country: India
- State: Uttar Pradesh
- District: Azamgarh

Government
  - Body: Gram panchayat

Languages
  - Official: Hindi
- Time zone: UTC+5:30 (IST)
- Vehicle registration: UP-
- Coastline: 0 kilometres (0 mi)
- Website: up.gov.in

Banahara is a village in Azamgarh district, Uttar Pradesh. It is situated on the banks of the Tamsa river. The village is near Durvasa.
