= Sangram Yadav =

Indian politician

Member of the Uttar Pradesh Legislative Assembly
- Incumbent
- Assumed office 2012
- Preceded by: Surendra Prasad Mishra
- Constituency: Atraulia

Personal details
- Born: 3 October 1971 (age 55) Senpur, Azamgarh, Uttar Pradesh
- Party: Samajwadi Party
- Parent: Balram Yadav
- Education: Allahabad University
- Occupation: MLA
- Profession: Politician, Agriculture

Sangram Yadav is an Indian politician. He served as a member of 16th and 17th Legislative Assembly, Uttar Pradesh . He represents the Atraulia constituency in Azamgarh district of Uttar Pradesh, India, and is a member of the Samajwadi Party.

== Early life ==
Yadav was born on 3 October 1971 in Senpur, Azamgarh to his father Balram Yadav (5 time MLA from Atraulia). He married Sandhya Yadav in 2005 and they had two sons.

He earned a M.A. degree in 1994, an LLB in 1997, and a PhD in 2005 from University of Allahabad.

== Political career ==
In 2012, he was elected by Atraulia constituency as a member of Samajwadi Party. He served as MLA for two consecutive terms. In his first term 16th Legislative Assembly of Uttar Pradesh (2012) elections he defeated Bahujan Samaj Party candidate, Surendra Prasad Mishra, by a margin of 43,620 votes.

In his second term 17th Legislative Assembly of Uttar Pradesh (2017), elections he defeated Bhartiya Janata Party candidate Kanhaiya Lal Nishad by a margin of 2,467 votes.

Terms
From	To	Position	Comments
March 2012	March 2017	Member, 16th Legislative Assembly of Uttar Pradesh	
March 2017	Incumbent	Member, 17th Legislative Assembly of Uttar Pradesh	
