= Mushtaq Ahmed Azmi =

Indian mass literacy expert

Mushtaq Ahmed
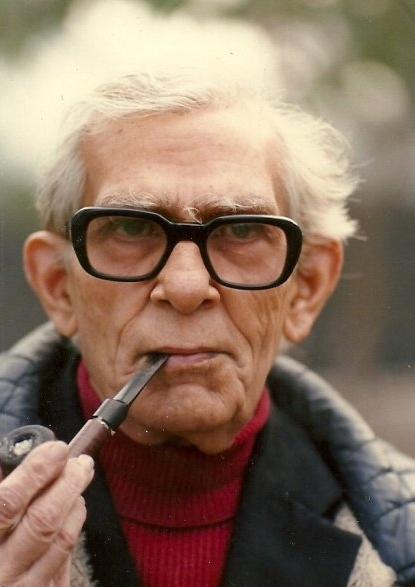
- Shri Mushtaq Ahmed
- Born: 1 June 1919; Rajapur Sikror, Azamgarh, Uttar Pradesh, India
- Died: 12 July 2011 (aged 92); New Delhi
- Education: Aligarh Muslim University; Michigan State University
- Occupation: Mass literacy expert

Mushtaq Ahmed Azmi (1 June 1919 – 12 July 2011), was a mass literacy expert. He was one of the first non-officials to be associated with the development of Adult Education program in India from the early 1950s, and was an early leader of the mass literacy movement. As an officer of UNESCO, he was posted in Africa and seconded to lead mass literacy programs in Nigeria and Zambia. He was offered a position in the UNESCO by the British diplomat and head of fundamental education at UNESCO John Bowers.

During his sixty-year career, he conducted a number of studies and wrote books and technical documents, which are used by experts and activists in the field of adult education.

He developed control, monitoring and evaluation systems for national literacy programs such as Total Literacy Campaigns (TLC) and Post Literacy Programs (PLP), and was an advocate of lifelong learning.

== Early life and education ==
Mushtaq Ahmed Azmi was born in the village of Rajapur Sikror, Saraimeer Azamgarh district, Uttar Pradesh. Thus, the suffix Azmi. He later dropped the suffix citing his leaving the place at the age of seven. His early education was in Burma under his paternal uncle. After the separation of Burma from India in 1935, he returned to India and enrolled at Jubilee College in Lucknow, UP.

He graduated first class with a Bachelor of Arts in history from Aligarh Muslim University in 1942 at the age of 23.

By the time he was 33 in 1952, he had received an Individual UNESCO Individual Training Fellowship. Ahmed embarked on the UNESCO Fellowship study program traveling to Jamaica (three and a half months), Haiti (two weeks), Puerto Rico (two weeks), and Nairobi (one and a half months). Throughout the program, he received further training in production programmes, techniques of writing text-books and follow-up reading materials, research and educational control necessary to produce well-graded materials according to the interest and level of comprehension of adult readers, techniques of distribution, illustration, printing, the relationship between production programmes, literacy campaigns and community development. He also trained in organizing, financing, staffing and equipping a vernacular literature bureau as well as learning of its production activities' connection to the education system and the mass education programme.

In 1954, Ahmed graduated with a Master of Communication Arts degree from Michigan State University in East Lancing, Michigan, United States.

== Career ==
In his 20s, Ahmed was comfortably employed with the Railways and Bridges Department in the United Provinces of British India where he translated letters between English and Urdu.

However, right around the time of India's independence in 1947, Dr. Zakir Husain - an educationist who became India's third President - exhorted the educated youth to leave colonial service and join nationalist institutions. Ahmed complied at once and joined Jamia Millia Islamia in 1948, where he wrote, compiled and edited follow-up reading materials for new literates.

This marked the beginning of a career spanning six decades in which Mushtaq Ahmed revived, mobilized and headed many institutions related to adult, primary and continuing education as detailed below.

By February 1951, Ahmed became the officiating director of the four Community Education Centers run by the Institute of Social Education in Jamia Millia Islamia (JMI). Within a year, he was holding the office of the Chief Editor in the institute.

In the three years immediately following India's independence (1948–51), he had written, edited and complied over 300 booklets for new literates, 100 of which were being published on behalf of the Government of India.

Upon his return from the UNESCO Fellowship program, Mushtaq was appointed as the Secretary of the Adult Education Department, where he stayed till 1955. As a UNESCO fellow, he was called on to serve as the assistant director of UNESCO Group Training Scheme for international literacy experts in Mysore which he responded to in affirmative and held the position till 1957.

He moved back to New Delhi in 1958 to serve as the Director of Research, Training and Production Center within Jamia Millia Islamia until 1960.

Meanwhile, Mrs. Welthy Honsinger Fisher had founded Literacy House in Lucknow, UP, in 1956 at the behest of Mahatma Gandhi. It secured funding from World Education, NY, in 1958 Mushtaq Ahmed was one of its earliest directors serving from 1960 to 1964 in Lucknow

Over the next one decade, from 1965 till 1978, Ahmed served as a UNESCO Adviser on adult literacy to the governments of Nigeria, Zambia, among others.

Upon his return to India in 1978, he held the office of Director, Center for Development of Women and Youth in Aligarh, UP. He shifted base to New Delhi in 1982, where he worked as the Director of the State Resource Center within Jamia Millia Islamia. In 1990, he resumed his position as the Director of Literacy House in Lucknow, UP and stayed there till 1993.

He was appointed as the Chairman of the National Institute of Adult Education (NIAE) in 1995, Ministry of Human Resource Development (HRD), Government of India, in New Delhi Simultanesouly, he also served as the Chairman of National Core Group, External Evaluation of Total Literacy Campaign (TLC)/Post-Literacy Programmes (PLP), an initiative of the Ministry of HRD, Government of India, New Delhi He stayed in the former position till 1999 and the latter, till 2001.

He also served as the Chairman of Krishi Vigyan Kendra (KVK) Sitapur, UP, and Jan Shiksha Sansthan (JSS), Handi, although the dates on these positions are to be confirmed.

== Publications ==
Mushtaq Ahmed was a prolific writer. Some of his published work related to adult education which serves as reference material for researchers and scholars is listed below:

- An Evaluation of Reading Materials for Neoliterates and a Study of their Reading Needs and Interests, Research, Training and Production Centre, Jamia Millia Islamia, New Delhi 1958
- A Survey of Reading Materials for Neoliterates, Research, Training and Production Center, JMI and Indian Adult Education Association, Govt. of India, New Delhi, 1957
- A Study of Post-Literacy Programmes (PLP), 1957
- A Study of Post-Literacy Programmes (PLP), 1958
- Teaching Adults to Read and Write, State Resource Centre (SRC), Jamia, New Delhi, 1959
- What Literacy Does to People, Ministry of Education, New Delhi, Govt. of India, 1965
- A Survey of Reading Materials for Neoliterates, Research, Training and Production Centre, Jamia Millia Islamia, New Delhi 1985
- How Long?, Indian Journal of Adult Education, New Delhi, Govt. of India, 1978
- How to Write Primers for Adults, Directorate of Adult Education, New Delhi, Govt. of India,1979
- How to Write Primers for Adults, Directorate of Adult education, New Delhi, Govt. of India, 1982
- A Study of the Relationship between the Period of Learning and the Extent of Retention of Literacy, Indian Adult Education Association (IAEA), New Delhi, Govt. of India, 1985
- A Study of Post-Literacy Programmes (PLP),1985
- Impact of Population Education on the Learners of Adult Education Programme, SRC, Jamia, New Delhi, 1990
- How to Evaluate Learning Outcomes of Total Literacy Campaigns (TLC), 1992
- A study on Total Literacy Campaigns, 1994
- How to Evaluate Learning Outcomes of TLC Districts, National Literacy Mission, Ministry of HRD, Govt. of India, 1996
- Equivalency of New Literates vis-a-vis Primary School Students, 1997
- Guidelines for Final Evaluation of Total Literacy Campaign Districts, Department of Education, Ministry of HRD, Govt. of India, 1997
- Survey of Knowledge, Opinion, and Attitude of Literate/Non-literate Adult Regarding ICPD Paradigm Shift, Directorate of Adult education, Govt. of India, 1998
- Mirror of Total Literacy Campaign (TLC) - An Evaluation of 71 External Evaluation Reports up to 1999, 2000
- Story of Adult Education, Jamia Millia Islamia, SRC Jamia, 2001
- Participation of Muslims, particularly Muslim women in Total Literacy Campaign, SRC, Jamia 2001

== Awards ==
Mushtaq Ahmed received a Lifetime Achievement Award in 1984 for his yeoman services to the field of adult education by the Indian Adult Education Association (IAEA).

In 1997, the Ministry of Human Resource Development, Government of India, conferred upon him a National Award for Literacy, in recognition of his outstanding lifetime services to the cause of promoting mass literacy in India.
