= Maharaja Suhel Dev University =

State public university in Azamgarh, Uttar Pradesh, India

Coordinates: 25°58′08″N 83°13′07″E

- Motto: ज्ञानं संस्कृतिः विकासश्च परमो ध्येयः
- Established: 2019
- Chancellor: Anandiben Patel
- Vice-Chancellor: Prof. Sanjeev Kumar
- Location: DAV P.G. College Campus, Raidopur, Azamgarh, Uttar Pradesh, 276001, Azamgarh, Uttar Pradesh, 276001, India
- Website: www.msdsu.ac.in

Maharaja Suhel Dev University formerly known as Maharaja Suhel Dev State University, is a state university in Azamgarh, Uttar Pradesh. The university was established in 2019 and commenced its first academic session in 2021-2022. Colleges in Azamgarh and Mau District are affiliated with this university. The university owes its name to a legendary king Suhaldev from Shravasti town of India, who according to some popular mentions defeated and killed the Ghaznavid general Ghazi Saiyyad Salar Masud at Bahraich in 1034 CE.

== Establishment ==
Maharaja Suheldev State University, Azamgarh, was established by the Government of Uttar Pradesh through its Gazette Notification No. 1446/79-V-1-19-1(K)-3-19, Lucknow, dated 5 August 2019. In compliance with Notification No. 610/Sattar-1-2021-16 (74)2018 TC, Lucknow, dated 28 April 2021, the university commenced its first academic session in 2021-2022. It was formaerly named as 'Maharaja Suhel Dev State University', and latter on in December 2024, the word 'State' was dropped by the amendment in the Uttar Pradesh State University Act, 1973 by the Uttar Pradesh Government.

== Affiliated colleges ==
Until the establishment of this university, the affiliated colleges of these two districts were associated with Veer Bahadur Singh Purvanchal University, Jaunpur.

As of 2025, the university, has 468 affiliated colleges, including 14 grant-in-aid non-government colleges, 4 government colleges, and 450 self-financed colleges.

== Academics ==
The university offers Undergraduate (UG), Post-graduate (PG) and Research courses (Ph.D.) at the campus.

The university has a research center named 'Rangeya Raghav Shodhpeeth' for advanced research in the field of Indian Knowledge System, established in February, 2024.
