= Dehduwar =

Coordinates: 25.88629050822468°N 82.83986292111308°E

Dehduwar is a village in Azamgarh district, Uttar Pradesh, India.
