= Frank F Islam =

American businessman

Frank Fakhrul Islam
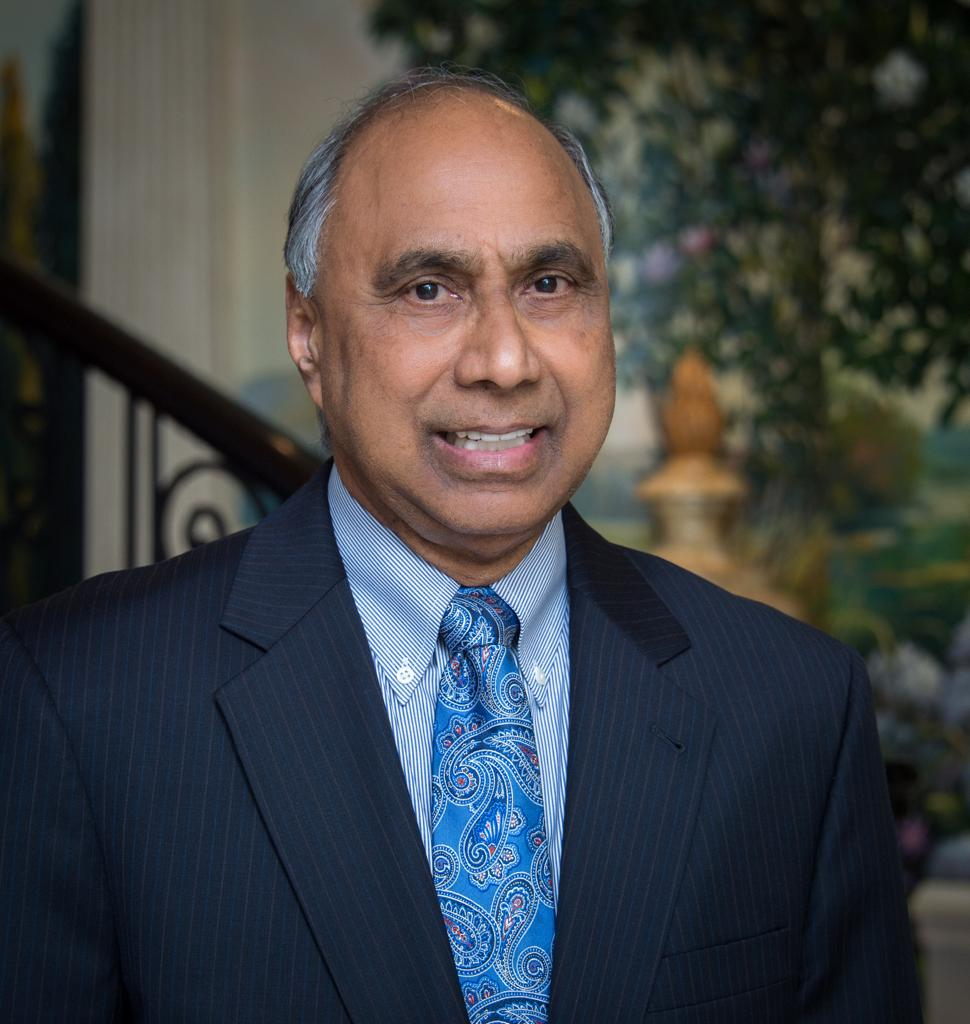
- Born: Azamgarh, India
- Education: Master of Science in Computers
- Alma mater: Aligarh Muslim University, University of Colorado
- Occupations: Chairman & CEO of FI Investment Group
- Spouse: Debbie Driesman
- Awards: Ernst & Young Entrepreneur of the Year Award 1999; Small Business Person of the Year of the Washington DC Metropolitan Area 2001; TiE Legends Award 2014; Martin Luther King Jr. Legacy Award 2015
- Website: frankislam.com

Frank Islam is an information technology entrepreneur, investor, philanthropist, civic leader, and writer who heads the FI Investment Group. He was the founder and CEO of the QSS Group. US President Barack Obama appointed him to be the General Trustee of the Board of Trustees of the John F. Kennedy Center for the Performing Arts in 2013.

== Early life and career ==
Islam was born in Azamgarh, Uttar Pradesh, India. He immigrated to the United States from India in 1970 when he was 15 years old. He completed his B.S. and M.S. in computer sciences from the University of Colorado at Boulder. He also worked at fast food restaurants to make money for living. His original name was Shah Islam, he got the name Frank from one of his professors at the University of Colorado.

== Entrepreneurship ==
Islam started the QSS Group, a federal government IT services company, in Lanham, Maryland in 1994 with a $50,000 bank loan. In 13 years he transformed it into a company with more than 3,000 employees and a revenue of nearly $300 million.

In 2007, he sold the firm to Perot Systems Corp. for $250 million in cash. Perot Systems was later acquired by Dell. Dell's IT Services unit (primarily Perot Systems) was acquired by NTT Data in 2016. He founded the FI investment Group, a private investment holding company after he sold QSS Group.

== Norton Manor ==
In 2014 Islam built Norton Manor, a 47,000 square-foot faux-Old European estate in Potomac, Maryland, where he regularly staged events for the Democratic Party. It took six years to build and was inspired by the White House.

== Philanthropy ==
Frank and his wife Debbie Driesman established a non-profit organization, The Frank Islam and Debbie Driesman Foundation, that supports civic, educational, cultural and artistic causes in the United States and around the world. His foundation also donated $2 million to the business school at his alma mater Aligarh Muslim University. He supports the Center for American Progress, a progressive public policy research and advocacy organization in United States. In September, 2013, U.S. President Barack Obama appointed him to the board of trustees of the John F. Kennedy Center for the Performing Arts. He is the founder and chairman of the Board of Directors of Potomac Charities, Inc.

== Advisory councils and boards ==
Frank Islam has served on a number of boards and advisory councils that include the board of trustees of the John F. Kennedy Center for the Performing Arts (2013 to 2019), the Board of Directors of Strathmore Center for the Arts (2008 to 2012), the National Democratic Institute (NDI) Chairman's Council (2013 to 2016), and the advisory committee of the Export–Import Bank of the United States (2010 to 2011).

Mr. Islam also serves as the member of the Kennedy Center International Committee on the Arts (2013 to present), the International Advisory Council of the U.S. Institute of Peace (2009 to present), the Woodrow Wilson Center National Cabinet (2012 to present), the Brookings Institution Council (2010 to present), the Maryland Governor's International Advisory Council (2011 to present), the Department of Commerce Industry Trade Advisory Committee (ITAC) (2010 to present), the JFK Library Foundation Board of Advisors (2017 to present), and the International Advisory Council of the United States Institute of Peace (2009 to present).

In the field of higher education, Mr. Islam serves as the member of the advisory board at the School of Advanced International Studies of Johns Hopkins University Advisory Council (2013 to present), the American University School of International Service Dean's Council (2013 to present), the Board of Trustees of the American University in the Emirates (2012 to present), the University of Malaysia International Advisory Panel (2012 to present), the George Mason University School of Management Dean's Council (2012 to present), and the advisory board of the University of Maryland Smith School of Business (2009 to present).

Frank also plans to develop an educational institute of his home district Azamgarh.

== Washington Current Review ==
He hosts his own TV show, Washington Current Review, on MHz Networks and is called upon to speak frequently at a variety of business, education and non-profit venues.

== Publications and articles ==
Frank has authored two books: Working the Pivot Points: To Make America Work Again and Renewing the American Dream: A Citizen’s Guide for Restoring Our Competitive Advantage. He also contributes to the HuffPost and writes occasional columns and articles for publications such as Foreign Policy, the Daily Times of Pakistan, the International Business Times and the Economic Times of India.

== Awards and recognition ==
He was recognized by the Ernst & Young Entrepreneur of the Year Award in 1999 and the US Small Business Administration selected him as the Small Business Person of the Year of the Washington DC Metropolitan Area in 2001. In 2014 he was awarded The Indus Entrepreneurs (TiE) Legends Award. In 2015 he received Martin Luther King Jr. Legacy Award for his contribution in international service and civil engagement. A conference room at the U.S. Institute of Peace is named after Frank Islam and his wife.

In 2016 Mr. Islam was the honoree of the InterFaith Conference of Metropolitan Washington.
