= Kohanda =

Village in India

Coordinates: 26°07′N 82°43′E

Kohanda is a village of Azamgarh, Uttar Pradesh.
