= Avantikapuri =

Awantikapuri is a village in Azamgarh district, Uttar Pradesh, India, which is now known as Avak,
