= Ahmad Ali Barqi Azmi =

Indian (Urdu-language) poet (1954–2022)

- احمد علی برقی اعظمی
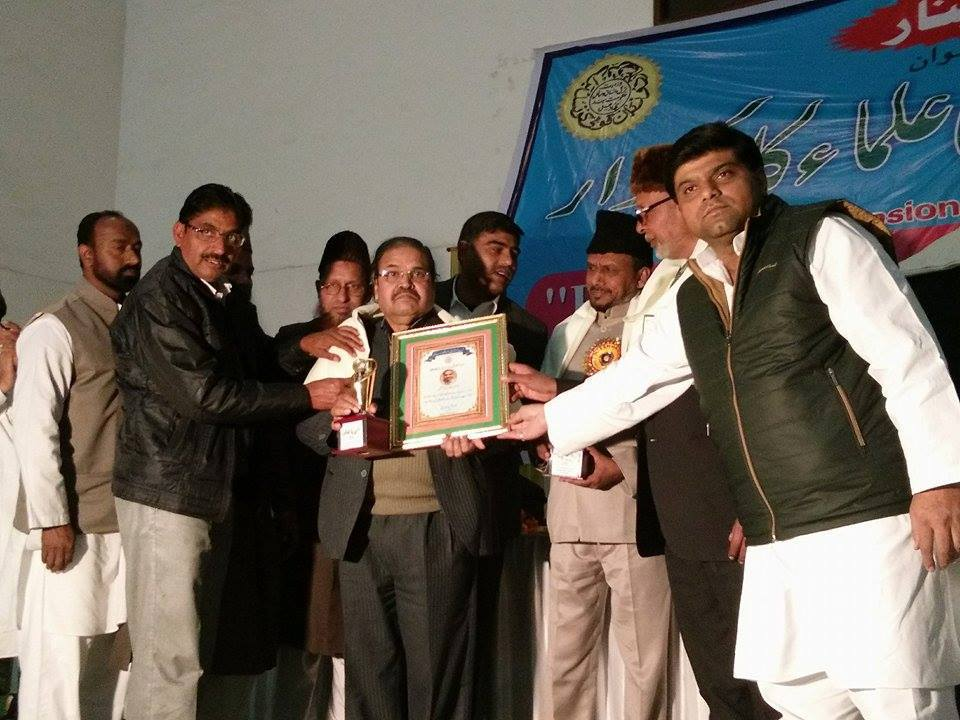
- Barqi Azmi receiving award
- Born: 25 December 1954; Azamgarh, Uttar Pradesh, India
- Died: 5 December 2022 (aged 67); Jaunpur, Uttar Pradesh, India
- Resting place: Kot, Azamgarh
- Occupations: Radio Announcer, translator, language expert, writer, poet

Ahmad Ali Barqi Azmi (25 December 1954 – 5 December 2022) was an Indian poet in the Urdu language. His poetic collections included Rooh-e-Sukhan. Professionally, he served in the Persian service of All India Radio, New Delhi. He devoted his life to furtherance of the Urdu language and its literary culture.

== Education ==
Ahmad Ali Barqi was educated at Shibli National College in Azamgarh and at Jawaharlal Nehru University, New Delhi. He held a degree in Education, a master's degree in Urdu and Persian, and received a doctorate in Modern and Classical Persian from the Centre of African & Asian Languages of Jawaharlal Nehru University in 1996.

== Literary works ==
Barqi's poetic works are assembled in the books Rooh-e-Sukhan published in 2013 and Mahshr e Khayal published in 2020. In this massive work, he treats traditional subject matter, such as romantic love and spiritual devotion, but also non-traditional topics such as the Internet and global health crises. He includes tributes to Urdu literary giants, including Mir Taqi Mir, Ghalib, Iqbal, Sir Syed, and Faiz Ahmad Faiz. He continued to publish new poems online in numerous international Urdu poetry forums, including HamariWeb, aalmiahkbar.com, and on Facebook.

Barqi's father, Rahmat Elahi Barqi, was also a renowned poet in Urdu, well known for his collection Tanweer-e-Sukhan, or "The Light of Language."

== Professional life ==
Barqi served as Translator-cum-Announcer (T/A In-charge) in the Persian Service of the External Services Division of All India Radio, New Delhi. He has traveled extensively, including to Iran and Afghanistan, on study tours. In addition to his own writing, he devoted his time and efforts to the furtherance of Urdu literary culture, promoting the works of Urdu poets of the past and present. In live forums and recitations, on television, radio, and social media, Dr. Barqi continued to spread international interest in the unique literary and cultural traditions of Urdu.

== Death ==
Barqi died in Jaunpur, Uttar Pradesh on 5 December 2022, at the age of 67 and buried in his neighborhood Kot, Azamgarh.

== Awards ==
- Academy Award, conferred by Urdu Academy, New Delhi.
