= Shibli National College =

College in Uttar Pradesh, India

- Established: 1883
- Founders: Shibli Nomani
- Affiliations: Maharaja Suhel Dev University
- Principal: Dr. Asfar Ali
- Location: Azamgarh, Uttar Pradesh, India; 26.0748512°N 83.1844133°E
- Campus: Urban
- Website: www.shiblicollege.ac.in

Shibli National College is an educational institution located in Azamgarh, Uttar Pradesh, India. Established in 1883 by the historian, educationist, and social reformer Allama Shibli Nomani, it began as a "National School" and has since evolved into a prominent center for higher education in eastern Uttar Pradesh.

Shibli College's library is considered one of the largest in Asia. The strength of the college is about ten thousand with almost equal number of male and female students.

== History ==
Shibli was an educationist and for a long time a companion and adviser to Sir Syed Ahmad Khan, the founder of Aligarh Muslim University Aligarh, India.

Shibli established the college in 1883, with an aim to uplifting and betterment of Muslim community.

This national school was upgraded to a middle school in 1887, then to a high school in 1895. It became an intermediate college in 1942 and was granted degree college status in 1946.

== Affiliations ==
The college is affiliated with Maharaja Suhel Dev University (MSDU), Azamgarh, and is recognised as a Muslim minority institute by the University Grants Commission (UGC).

== Courses ==
It offers a range of undergraduate, postgraduate, and doctoral programs across multiple disciplines, including arts, science, commerce, law, and education.

== Departments of the college ==
Faculty of science

Department of Botany, Department of Chemistry, Department of Mathematics, Department of Physics, Department of Zoology, Department of Industrial Chemistry, Department of Bicohemistry, Department of Microbiology, Department of Biotechnology, Department of Geology, Department of Statistics. "Department of Computer Science"

Faculty of Arts

Department of English, Department of Geography, Department of Hindi, Department of Philosophy, Department of Psychology, Department of Sociology, Department of Urdu, Department of Arabic, Department of Defense and strategic studies, Department of Economics, Department of History, Department of political science, Department of education, Department of Persian, Department of Sanskrit, Department of Physical Education, Department of Home Science.

Faculty of Commerce

Department of commerce, Department of Business Management

Faculty of Law

Department of Law

Faculty of Education

Department of teacher education (B.Ed.)

Faculty of Computer

Department of Computer Science and Application

== Library ==
Shibli College's library is considered one of the largest in Asia. It houses approximately 750 handwritten manuscripts. Additionally, it features works such as 'Al-Arawah' and 'Sirre Akbar' by Jahangir's daughter, Jahan Ara, as well as famous Hindu scriptures like the Upanishads and a Persian translation of the Mahabharata.
