= Atraulia =

- City
- Location in Uttar Pradesh, India
- Coordinates: 26.33°N 82.95°E
- Country: India
- State: Uttar Pradesh
- District: Azamgarh

Government
  - MLA: Sangram Yadav
- Elevation: 81 m (266 ft)

Population (2021)
  - Total: 45,680

Languages
  - Official: Hindi, English
- Time zone: UTC+5:30 (IST)
- Postal code: 223223

Atraulia is a town and a Nagar Panchayat in the Azamgarh district within the Indian state of Uttar Pradesh. It is famous for Eddy Electricals (India) Pvt Ltd.

== Geography ==
Atraulia has an average elevation of 81 metres (265 feet). The nearest river is Ghagra, also known as the Saryu river.

It is situated on the main road from Azamgarh to Lucknow.

== Demographics ==
The total population was 19,586 in the 2011 census.

Religions in Atraulia
Religion	Percent
Hindus	90%
Muslims	9%
Jains	0.5%
Others†	0.5%
Distribution of religions †Includes Sikhs (0.2%), Buddhists (<0.2%).
