= Delhi Urdu Academy =

Cultural organization

- Formation: 31 March 1981; 45 years ago
- Type: Literary
- Legal status: Registered Society, City Government of Delhi
- Purpose: Literary and Cultural activities
- Headquarters: New Delhi
- Location: New Delhi
- Official language: Urdu
- Main organ: Academy, Library, Auditorium, Publications
- Parent organization: Urdu Academy, Delhi
- Affiliations: Registrar of Societies, Delhi
- Website: Official Website
- Remarks: To serve the Urdu language in New Delhi

Urdu Academy, Delhi (Urdu: اردو اکادمی، دہلی) In the interest of developing the Urdu language and preserving the Urdu tradition and culture.

== History ==
The then Delhi Administration with a motto of establishing an Urdu institution to look after the development of the Urdu literature, cultural heritage, educational upliftment, in May 1981 under the Chairmanship of Lt. Governor of Delhi, established this institution as a composite institute with literary, cultural and educational goals. This was established in the heart of New Delhi.

According to the bill 2000, the Delhi government has announced Urdu as second official language of Delhi.

== Activities ==
Activities are classified in the following categories

- Publication, translation and printing of the books
- Research work, drama, festivals, seminars, symposiums, mushairas and national events.
- Honouring the literary personalities, awarding prizes, awards etc.,
- Establishment of Urdu Teaching centres and National Urdu Library.

== Publications ==
- Aiwan-e-Urdu (Urdu monthly magazine)
- Umang (Children's Urdu monthly magazine)
