= Katghar Lalganj =

- Town
- Location in Uttar Pradesh, India Katghar Lalganj (India)
- Coordinates: 25°48′6″N 82°59′58″E
- Country: India
- State: Uttar Pradesh
- District: Azamgarh

Population (2011)
  - Total: 581,647

Languages
  - Official: Hindi[Bhojpuri]
- Time zone: UTC+5:30 (IST)
- Postal code: 276202
- Vehicle registration: UP 50
- Website: up.gov.in

Katghar Lalganj is a sub-district, town and a Nagar Panchayat in Azamgarh district in the Indian state of Uttar Pradesh.It comes under the Parliamentary Constituency - Lalganj (Lok Sabha constituency).

== Demographics ==
As of 2011 India census, Katghar Lalganj had a population of 581,647. Males constitutes 280,992 and females 300,655. Katghar Lalganj had an average literacy rate of 59%, lower than the national average of 59.5%: male literacy was 66%, and female literacy was 51%. In Katghar Lalganj, 18% of the population was under 6 years of age.

The Lalganj is a tehsil headquarters. It is around 50 km from the Varanasi and is between Varanasi and Azamgarh Highway. Devgaon, 4 km from the Lalganj, is another place of major habitation. Other major places which fall under the tehsil are Gorhara, Khargipur, Bardah, Meh Nagar, and Tarwa.

The main occupation of the people living in Lalganj Tehsil is agriculture. The area has fertile land with wheat and paddy as the major food crop grown. Potato, maize, and vegetable crops are some of the other crops of the area.
