= Government Medical College and Super Facility Hospital, Azamgarh =

State-run medical college in Chakrapanpur of Azamgarh, India

- Motto: Sincerity-Service-Sacrifice
- Type: State Medical College
- Established: 2006; 20 years ago
- Affiliations: National Medical Commission
- Academic affiliations: Atal Bihari Vajpayee Medical University (2021 - present); King George's Medical University (2013 - 2021)
- Principal: Dr. Birendra Kumar Raw
- Undergraduates: 100 per annum
- Postgraduates: 8 per annum
- Location: Azamgarh, Uttar Pradesh, India; 25.904127°N 83.205252°E
- Campus: Rural
- Website: gmcazamgarh.com

Government Medical College and Super Facility Hospital, Azamgarh is a state-run medical college located in Chakrapanpur of Azamgarh, Uttar Pradesh.

The college has guidance and mentorship of Baba Raghav Das Medical College, Gorakhpur.

== History ==
In 2006, the Government of Uttar Pradesh decided to set up a new medical college and hospital at Azamgarh in the eastern part of the state at an approximate cost of ₹300 crore (equivalent to ₹964 crore or US$100 million in 2023). In 2013, the institute was recognized for 100 M.B.B.S. seats by Medical Council of India (now National Medical Commission).

In 2006, OPDs were started which gradually shifted to 140 Bedded IPD & Presently GMC & SFH is running with 550 Beds IPDs, well created emergency & Private wards. The Hospital has well trained Health Care workers including Clinicians, Nursing Staff & Paramedical Staff. The Academic activities started in August 2013 with first Batch of MBBS students.

== Courses ==
Each year 100 students are allowed to take admission in the M.B.B.S. course by the competitive examination NEET.

== Campus ==
The Government Medical College & Super Facility Hospital is situated at Chakrapanpur of the historic city of Azamgarh in U.P. Chakrapanpur is about 20 km away from Azamgarh city. GMC & SFH is spread in 105 acre area which includes Administrative Block, Academic Block, Central Library, Examination hall, Auditorium, Lecture Theater & Various Departments of Medical Education. It also consists of different Residents as faculty and staff flats, S.R. Hostel, J.R. Hostel, Boys hostel, Girls hostel, Intern Girls and Boys hostel, Nursing Hostel & Guest house.
