= Kanhaiya Lal Misra =

Indian lawyer and independence activist

Pt. Kanhaiya Lal Misra
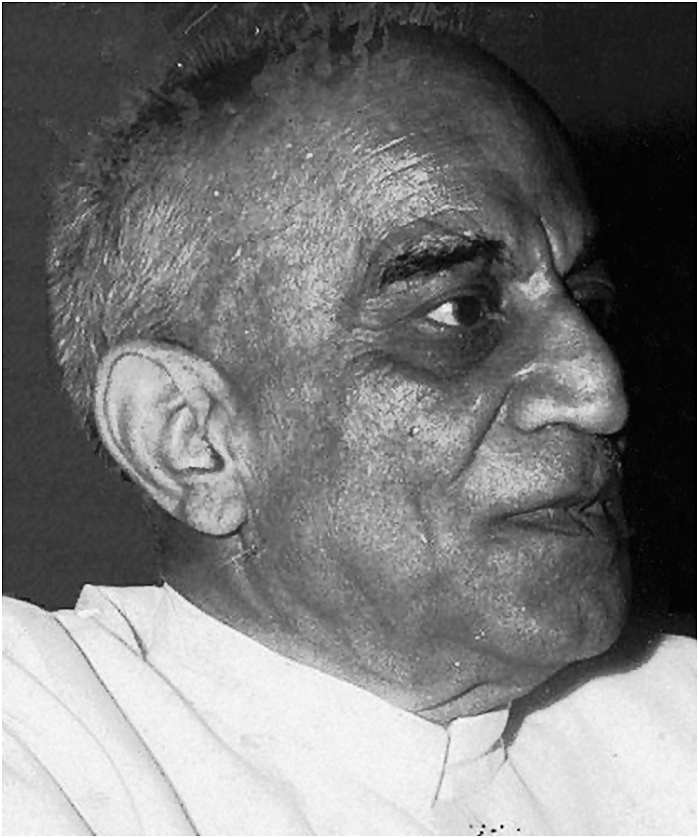

Advocate General (U.P.) India
- In office 22 May 1952 – 9 March 1969

Personal details
- Born: 31 August 1903 Mau, United Provinces of Agra and Oudh, British India
- Died: 14 October 1975 (aged 72) Allahabad, Uttar Pradesh, India

Pt. Kanhaiya Lal Misra (31 August 1903 – 14 October 1975) was an Indian lawyer and independence activist. He was the Advocate General of Uttar Pradesh from 1952 to 1969.

== Early life ==
Misra was born in a family of Mariyadpur (now in Mau) in district Azamgarh of Uttar Pradesh. As he was born on Krishna Janmashtami his parents named him Kanhaiya Lal. He was the eldest of four sons and one daughter of Baidnath Misra, a civil and a criminal lawyer, at the Azamgarh Bar, and a long-serving M.L.C.

== Marriage and children ==
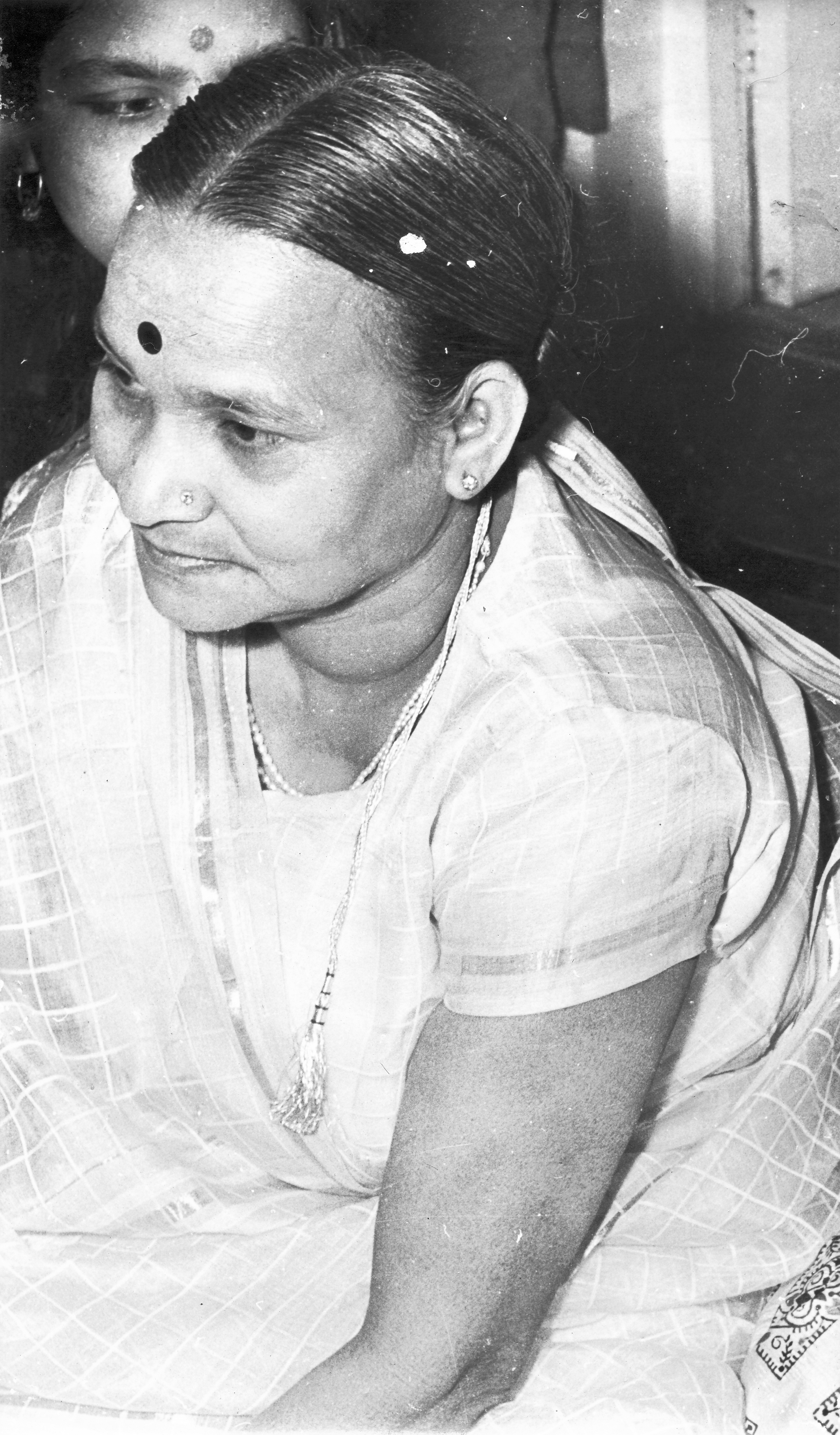
Smt. Gayatri Devi (wife)

Pt. Kanhaiya Lal Misra married twice.

His first marriage was to Savitri Devi who bore two children Shanti (daughter) and Vijay Prakash (son).

After the death of Savitri Devi, he married Gayatri Devi. They would have five children together: Ravindra Prakash (son), Justice Ajay Prakash (son), Jyoti (daughter), Priti (daughter), Ranjan (son) and Munindra (son). Gayatri Devi died on 29 April 1969.

== Advocate General U.P. (India) ==
Misra was the fourth Advocate General of the state of Uttar Pradesh since the creation of the position of Advocate General in 1937, the year that saw the formation of the first responsible representative government in the province by the Indian National Congress, under the Government of India Act, 1935. He held this position from 1952 to 1969, during which period different political parties across the political spectrum were elected and formed the government. This remains a record as of date - October 2015. He resigned as Advocate General U.P. in 1969 - the year his wife died.

== Timeline ==
Pt. Kanhaiya Lal Misra studied at Banaras (Varanasi) in the Theosophical School under Dr. Mrs. Annie Beasant. He graduated with honours in Economics securing 91% marks in English in 1925.

He sat for the Indian Civil Service Examination in 1926 and securing 150/150 in the English paper, an unbreakable record. However, due to his student day's speeches of freedom and his influence by Mahatma Gandhi he was not selected. In 1927 he passed his Law Examination and joined the District Bar. In October 1930 he shifted to the Allahabad High Court where he demonstrated an exceptional command of the Hindi, English and Urdu languages.

He was imprisoned in 1942 during the Indian freedom struggle in the Naini Central Jail along with Pt. Jawaharlal Nehru, Lal Bahadur Shastri, P. D. Tandon and others.

In 1951, he declined an offer for a judgeship. He continued his legal practice, gaining a reputation for his advocacy and command of legal scholarship.

He was appointed Advocate General, U.P. in 1952 and continued till 9 March 1969 irrespective of the political party which came to power during this period.

In 1955 he was offered Supreme Court Judgeship (being the first advocate to receive such distinction) without being a judge. He requested through the Chief Justice of Allahabad High Court – Justice B. Malik, the then Chief Minister and Home Minister to spare him which again they did reluctantly. His reason was that he wanted to be in public life, serving institutions and the public at large. In 1969, the year his wife expired, he resigned as Advocate General U.P.

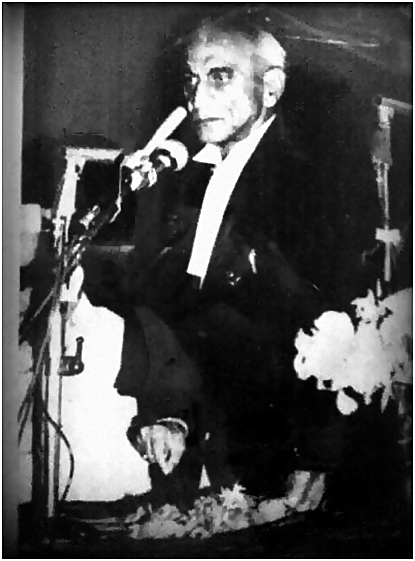
Pt. K.L. Misra Speaking at Allahabad High Court Centenary Celebrations 1966

He attained excellence in the legal profession in the country and appeared in most High Courts and Supreme Court of India. During the time he was Advocate General of U.P. and even thereafter he appeared for several states of the country in important cases, viz. Punjab, Madhya Pradesh, Maharashtra, Bihar, West Bengal etc.

Some famous cases conducted by him were the Blitz case in the Bombay High Court, Maharashtra – Mysore boundary dispute, case of Sri Pratap Singh Kairon, for States of West Bengal and Bihar, in-famous Symbol Case before the Election Commission, Golakhnath Case in the Supreme Court and in the case against Murdhra etc. He had the distinction of appearing against almost all the top advocates of the country.

He appeared successfully for the state of Bihar against the Raja of Ramgarh in the Calcutta High court. He commanded the top position on both civil and criminal side and attained the position of a legal luminary and senior advocate.

Pt. K.L. Misra conducted on behalf of the ruling Congress, the Indian Congress Party Symbol Case in the Supreme Court, was also responsible for defending the State Government in the State Zamindari Abolition case and defended for some time Mrs. Indira Gandhi, the Prime Minister, in her election petition case at the Allahabad High Court prior to his falling ill and thereafter the case was handed over to Mr. Sri Satish Chand Khare, Senior Advocate. Mrs Gandhi subsequently lost this case which led to the Emergency being imposed in India

== Social works ==
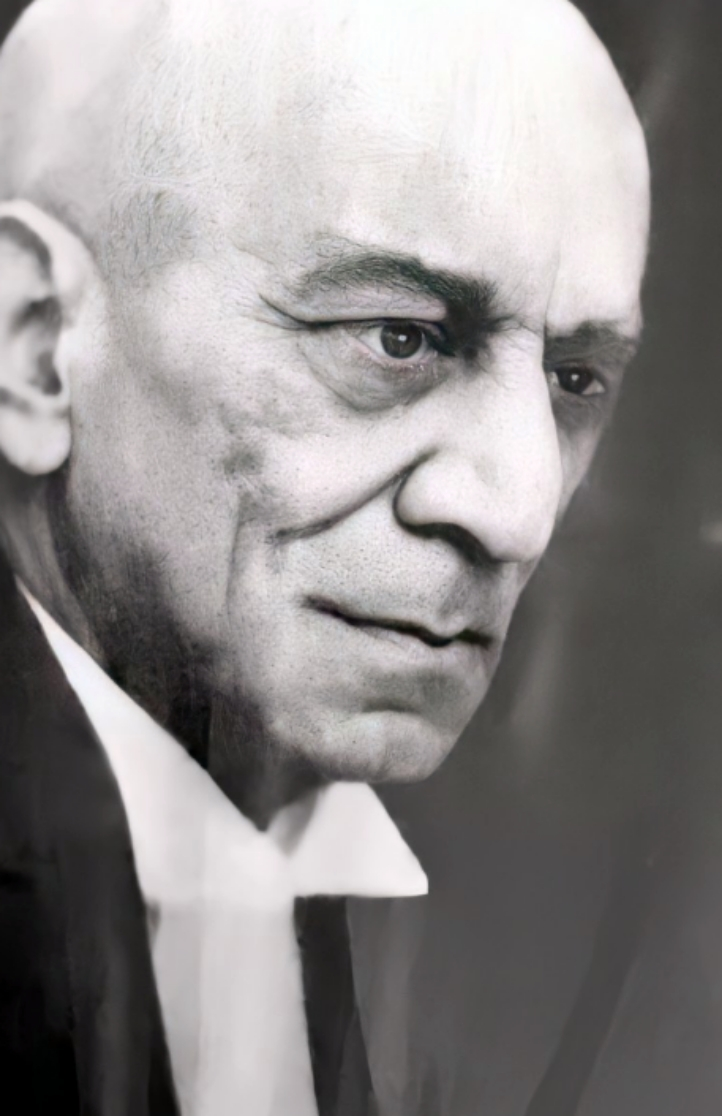
Advocate General U.P. INDIA 1952-69

He was the Chairman of the Bar Council (17/12/1961 to 09/03/1969), President of the Bar Association of Allahabad, President of the Harish Chandra Research Institute and member of its executive council, President of the Prayag Sangeet Samiti, President of the All India Hindi Sahitya Sammellan to name a few. He also had the honour to serve the Allahabad University as its Hon' Treasurer and as a member of its executive council and also judged answer papers of the Law examination way above the L.L.B. degree that he held as his personal educational qualification in Law.

A relatively unknown trait of Punditji was his poetry writing capabilities (in Hindi) when emotionally charged - like on demise of his wife, Gayatri Devi.

== Demise ==
Pt. Kanhaiya Lal Misra, former Advocate General U.P., India, a leading luminary and a prominent Congress leader died of heart failure on 14 October 1975 morning at his Park Road residence on Dussehra. His cremation took place with State Honours in the evening (sunset) of the same day, on the banks of 'sangam' – the point of mergence of the rivers Ganga and Jamuna

— 16th Oct. 1975, Northern India Patrika, Allahabad (U.P.) India.
