= Kausar Yazdani =

Indian Islamic scholar, author and activist (1935–2011)

Kausar Yazdani (1935 – 29 August 2011) was an Indian Islamic scholar, author, journalist and activist and Secretary for Dawah, Jamaat-e-Islami Hind. His specialisation was in comparative studies of Hindu scriptures and literature with Islamic literature. He stayed in Delhi.

After retirement from the Jamaat he was engaged in translation of rare Islamic manuscripts into the Hindi language. He later translated Bukhari in three volumes. He belonged to the famous Deobandi Muslim family of Hussain Ahmad Madani.

== Biography ==
=== Early life and education ===
Kausar Yazdani was born 1935 at Katalpur village, in the Azamgarh district of Uttar Pradesh. His father was in the police department and retired when he was studying in class VII. He gained a BA in 1955 from Shibli College.

He graduated from Shibli College, Azamgarh, and earned Master of Arts and Doctor of Philosophy degrees in the Hindi language from Agra University. He also completed the scholar certification at the Nadwatul Ulema, Lucknow, and Fazeelat from Rampur.

The topic of his PhD was Sufi Darshan evam Sadhna ka Kramik Vikas tatha Kutban, Manjhan evam Jaysee. (Development of Mysticism in Hindi with reference to the Poetry of Kutban, Manjhan and Jaysee).

=== Association and activism with Jamat Islami Hind ===
When Nadvi joined the Kanti, he did not know the Arabic language. But as he chose the dawah path, he decided to learn Arabic and studied the language from Maulana Salman Qasmi at Rampur. Then he took three years leave to study Arabic and Islamic sciences at Darul Uloom Nadwatul Ulama, Lucknow. Jamaat chief Maulana Abul lais allowed him to work from Lucknow and granted him the required leave.

=== Death ===
Yazdani died on 29 August 2011, at the age of 75.
