= Samajwadi Party =

Political party in India

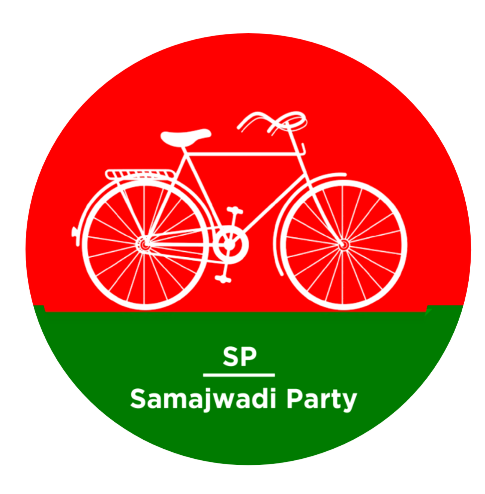
- Abbreviation: SP
- President: Akhilesh Yadav
- General Secretary: Ram Gopal Yadav; Azam Khan; Shivpal Singh Yadav; Indrajit Saroj; Lalji Verma; Awadhesh Prasad; Ram Achal Rajbhar; Balram Yadav; Vishambhar Prasad Nishad; Ram Ji Lal Suman; Harendra Singh Malik
- Rajya Sabha Leader: Ram Gopal Yadav
- Lok Sabha Leader: Akhilesh Yadav
- Founder: Mulayam Singh Yadav
- Founded: 4 October 1992 (34 years ago)
- Split from: Janata Dal
- Headquarters: 18 Copernicus Lane, New Delhi
- Newspaper: Samajwadi Bulletin
- Student wing: Samajwadi Chatra Sabha
- Youth wing: Samajwadi Prahari Samajwadi Yuvjan Sabha
- Women's wing: Samajwadi Mahila Sabha
- Ideology: Left-wing populism Social democracy Social justice
- Political position: Left-wing
- International affiliation: Progressive Alliance
- Colours: Red Green
- ECI status: State Party
- Alliance: National Alliance INDIA (2023–present); Regional Alliance SP+ (Uttar Pradesh); Former Alliance Left Front (1996–2016) (West Bengal)
- Seats in Rajya Sabha: 4 / 245
- Seats in Lok Sabha: 37 / 543
- Seats in State Legislative Council's: 10 / 100 (Uttar Pradesh)
- Seats in State Legislative Assemblies: 101 / 403 (Uttar Pradesh) 2 / 288 (Maharashtra) 1 / 182 (Gujarat)
- Number of states and union territories in government: 0 / 31

Election symbol
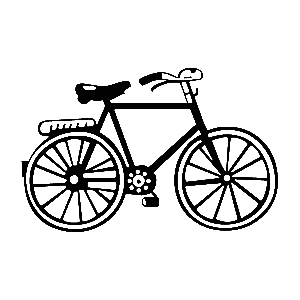

Party flag
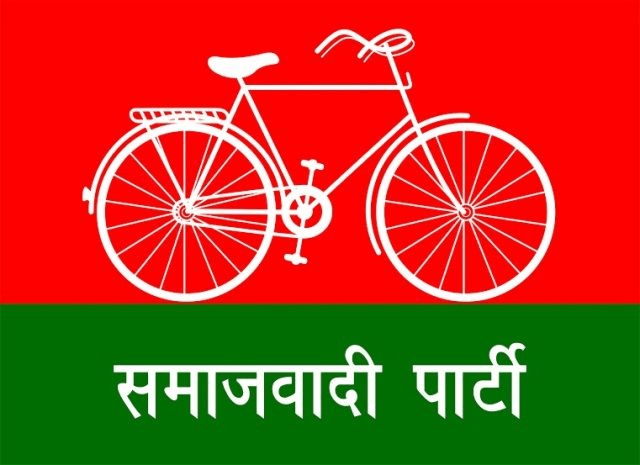

Website
- www.samajwadiparty.in

The Samajwadi Party (SP; lit. 'Socialist Party') is a socialist political party in India. It was founded on 4 October 1992 by former Janata Dal politician Mulayam Singh Yadav and is headquartered in New Delhi. It is the third-largest party in Lok Sabha, and is led by former Chief Minister of Uttar Pradesh, Akhilesh Yadav.

While the party is largely based in Uttar Pradesh, it has significant presence in many other Indian states as well. It has been the ruling party in the state of Uttar Pradesh for four terms – three times under Chief Minister Mulayam Singh Yadav, the fourth and most recent being Chief Minister Akhilesh Yadav's full majority government in the 2012–2017 Uttar Pradesh Legislative Assembly.

The coalition of the party and its alliance partners: Samajwadi Alliance (SP+) is currently the largest bloc in Uttar Pradesh in terms of Lok Sabha MPs. The alliance has one of the largest vote bases in the state of Uttar Pradesh in terms of the collective voting pattern, with more than 37% vote share in the 2022 assembly elections and 44% in the 2024 general elections.

== History ==
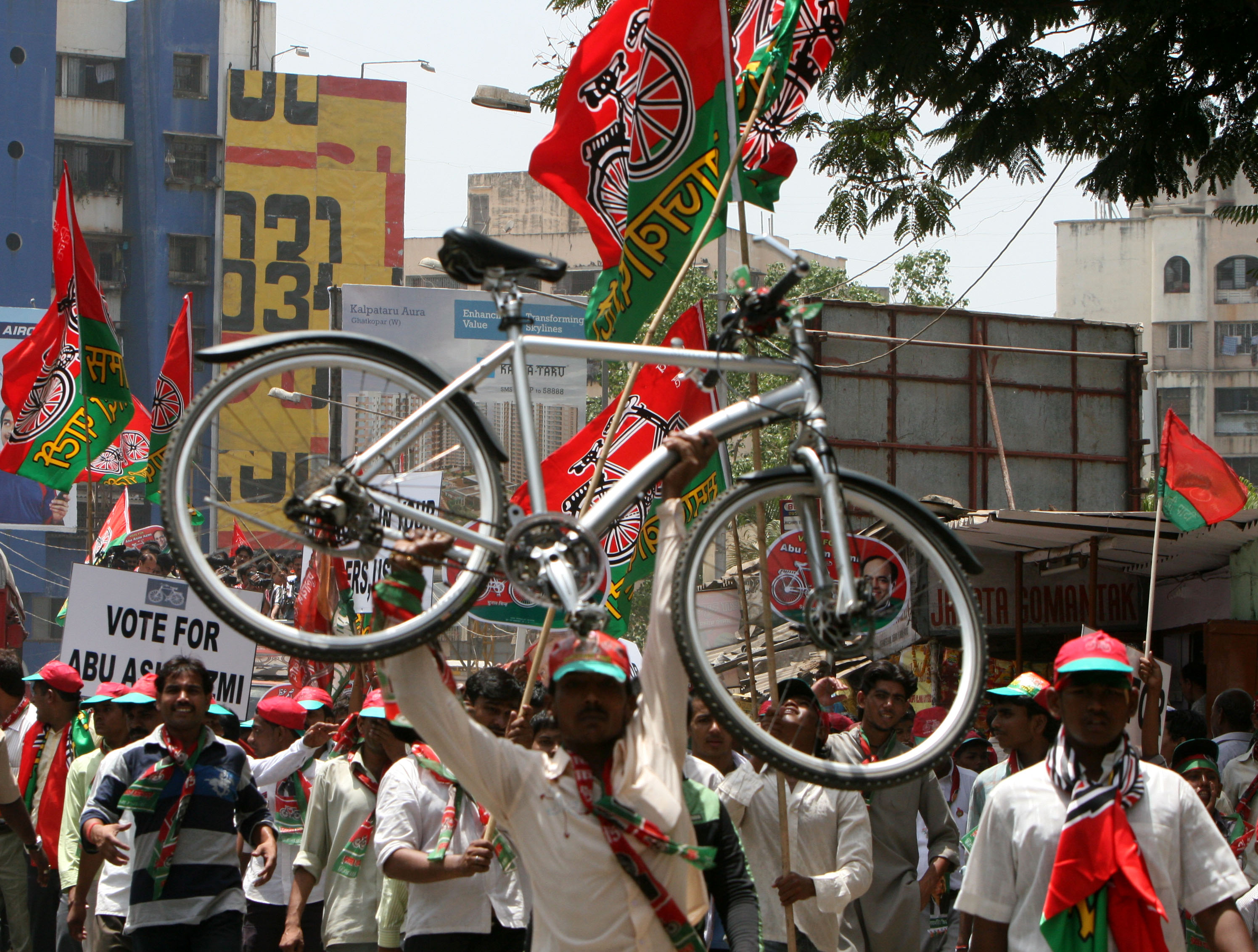
In Mumbai, a supporter of the Samajwadi Party carries a bicycle, which is the symbol featured on the socialist party's flag.

The Samajwadi Party was one of several parties that emerged when Janata Dal fragmented into several regional parties. The party was founded by Mulayam Singh Yadav in 1992. Created just months before the Babri Masjid demolition, the party rose to power by pursuing secular politics. The support of its key voters, Other Backward Classes and Muslims helped the party become a major political force in Uttar Pradesh.

In West Bengal, the West Bengal Socialist Party of Kiranmoy Nanda merged with the SP in 2010. The Samajwadi Party is now led by former Chief Minister of Uttar Pradesh, Akhilesh Yadav.

He was chosen as the President for the first time in an Emergency meeting in 2017. He was chosen for second time in 2017 at Agra Convention of Samajwadi Party. He was chosen for the third time at the party's national convention held in September 2022 at Lucknow, after he was chosen as the President at the party's national convention held on 1 January 2017.

The party have contested Lok Sabha and State Assembly elections around the country, but by far the bulk of its victories have been in Uttar Pradesh. In the 2012 legislative assembly elections of Uttar Pradesh, SP registered a landslide victory with a clear majority in the house, thus enabling it to form a government in the state. This was expected to be the fifth term of Mulayam Singh Yadav as Chief Minister of state, but he selected his son, Akhilesh Yadav instead. This became official on 15 March. It was also the first time that SP was head of the UP government for a full term of five years. However, the party suffered a landslide defeat in the 2017 Uttar Pradesh Legislative Assembly Election, slumping to only 47 seats as the Bharatiya Janata Party swept to victory. The major loss of Samajwadi Party was attributed to several factors, most notably being corruption, several political controversies, deteriorating law and order, and insensitive comments on rape as well as anti-women views.

=== National Convention of January 2017 ===
In a National Convention held on 1 January 2017, called by Ram Gopal Yadav, Akhilesh Yadav was appointed as president of the Party for five years.

== Position in state and national politics ==
=== Alliance ===
==== UPA ====
The Samajwadi Party provided outside support to the United Progressive Alliance government up to the fourteenth general election. After the fourteenth general election, its support became unnecessary when the UPA became the largest alliance. It contested the 2009 general election in alliance with the Rashtriya Janata Dal and the Lok Janshakti Party of Bihar.

In April 2014, the Save Indian Family Foundation encouraged voters to support the Samajwadi Party or vote None of the above because they had said they opposed the alleged misuse of gender bias laws.

==== SP-BSP Alliance ====
In 2019 general election, the Samajwadi Party was defeated by the BJP in Uttar Pradesh though allying with Bahujan Samaj Party. It became the thirteenth largest party in parliament. In the general elections of 2019, it won only five seats, while the BSP won 10.

==== INDIA ====
Recently, Samajwadi Party joined the newly formed Indian National Developmental Inclusive Alliance (I.N.D.I.A) formed as an umbrella alliance of opposition parties in India.

In the 2024 Indian general election, the Samajwadi Party achieved a historic breakthrough by winning 37 seats, making it the third-largest party in the 18th Lok Sabha. In Uttar Pradesh, the Samajwadi Party contested the elections in alliance with the Indian National Congress. Together, they secured 43 out of the 80 seats in the state, marking a significant gain for the INDIA Alliance.

=== Presence in state assemblies ===
The SP has two MLAs in Maharashtra and one MLA in the 2022 Gujarat assembly election.

== Samajwadi Prahari and Samajwadi Sanwad ==
Under the guidance of Kailash Chaurasia, who was the Minister of State in the Government of Uttar Pradesh and under the direction of Dr.Arvind Srivastava, Shri Shivendra Nandan made the formal announcement of the formation of Samajwadi Sentinel and in this sequence, Samajwadi Samvad to put forward the public's views. He reportedly cited the fight for equal rights for all races and issues related to inequality in youth-related matters as the main issues presented. The Samajwadi Party has front line campaigning groups. Ongoing debate on party policy comes from many of their leaders. Among them are:

1. Chhatra Sabha Sanwad
2. Yuvjan Sabha Sanwad
3. Samajwadi prahari Sanwad
4. Mulayam Singh Youth Brigade Sanwad
5. Lohiya Vahini Sanwad
6. Shikshak Sabha Sanwad
7. Vyapar Sabha Sanwad
8. Adhivakta Sabha Sanwad
9. Ambedkar Vahini Samwad

== Electoral performances ==
=== Lok Sabha Elections ===
Lok Sabha Term	Lok Sabha	Seats contested	Seats won	% of votes	State (seats)	Ref
11th Lok Sabha	1996	111	17 / 543	3.3%	Uttar Pradesh (16), Bihar (1)	
12th Lok Sabha	1998	166	19 / 543	4.9%	Uttar Pradesh (19)	
13th Lok Sabha	1999	151	26 / 543	3.8%	Uttar Pradesh (26)	
14th Lok Sabha	2004	237	36 / 543	4.3%	Uttar Pradesh (35), Uttarakhand (1)	
15th Lok Sabha	2009	193	23 / 543	3.4%	Uttar Pradesh (23)	
16th Lok Sabha	2014	197	5 / 543	3.4%	Uttar Pradesh (5)	
17th Lok Sabha	2019	49	5 / 543	2.6%	Uttar Pradesh (5)	
18th Lok Sabha	2024	62	37 / 543	4.58%	Uttar Pradesh (37)	

All time-SP Lok Sabha seat count

=== Assembly Elections ===
Vidhan Sabha Term	UP Elections	Seats contested	Seats won	% of votes	Party Votes	Ref
Uttar Pradesh Legislative Assembly
12th Vidhan Sabha	1993	256	109 / 425	17.94%	8,963,697	
13th Vidhan Sabha	1996	281	110 / 425	21.80%	12,085,226	
14th Vidhan Sabha	2002	390	143 / 403	25.37%	13,612,509	
15th Vidhan Sabha	2007	393	97 / 403	25.43%	13,267,674	
16th Vidhan Sabha	2012	401	224 / 403	29.15%	22,107,241	
17th Vidhan Sabha	2017	311	47 / 403	21.82%	18,923,689	
18th Vidhan Sabha	2022	347	111 / 403	32.06%	29,543,934	
Madhya Pradesh Legislative Assembly
11th Vidhan Sabha	1998	228	4 / 320	1.58%	419,626	
12th Vidhan Sabha	2003	161	7 / 230	3.71%	946,891	
13th Vidhan Sabha	2008	187	1 / 230	1.90%	501,324	
14th Vidhan Sabha	2013	161	0 / 230	1.2%	404,853	
15th Vidhan Sabha	2018	52	1 / 230	1.3%	496,025	
16th Vidhan Sabha	2023	71	0 / 230	0.46%	200,069	
Maharashtra Legislative Assembly
9th Vidhan Sabha	1995	22	3 / 288	0.93%	356,731	
10th Vidhan Sabha	1999	15	2 / 288	0.7%	227,640	
11th Vidhan Sabha	2004	95	0 / 288	1.13%	471,425	
12th Vidhan Sabha	2009	31	4 / 288	1.11%	337,378	
13th Vidhan Sabha	2014	22	1 / 288	0.17%	92,304	
14th Vidhan Sabha	2019	7	2 / 288	0.22%	123,267	
15th Vidhan Sabha	2024	9	2 / 288	0.38%	246,350	

== List of chief ministers ==
No.	Name	Constituency	Term of office		Tenure length	Party (Note: This column only names the chief minister's party. The state government he or she heads may be a complex coalition of several parties and independents; these are not listed here.)	Assembly (Election)	Ref
1	Mulayam Singh Yadav	Jaswantnagar	5 Dec 1989	24 Jun 1991	1 year, 201 days	Janata Dal	Tenth Assembly (1989–91) (1989 election)	
(1)	Mulayam Singh Yadav	Jaswantnagar	4 Dec 1993	3 Jun 1995	1 year, 181 days	Samajwadi Party	Twelfth Assembly (1993–95) (1993 election)	
(1)	Mulayam Singh Yadav	Gunnaur	29 Aug 2003	13 May 2007	3 years, 257 days	Samajwadi Party	Fourteenth Assembly (2002–07) (2002 election)	
2	Akhilesh Yadav	MLC	15 Mar 2012	19 Mar 2017	5 years, 4 days	Samajwadi Party	Sixteenth Assembly (2012–17) (2012 election)	

== List of union ministers ==
No.	Photo	Portfolio	Name (Lifespan)	Assumed office	Left office	Duration	Constituency (House)	Prime Minister	
1		Minister of Defence	Mulayam Singh Yadav (1939–2022)	1 June 1996	21 April 1997	1 year, 290 days	Mainpuri (Lok Sabha)	Prime Minister	Deve Gowda
1		Minister of Defence	Mulayam Singh Yadav (1939–2022)	21 April 1997	18 March 1998	1 year, 290 days	Mainpuri (Lok Sabha)	I.K. Gujral	
2		Minister of Communications (MoS(I/C) until 10 July 1996)	Beni Prasad Verma (1941–2020)	29 June 1996	21 April 1997	1 year, 263 days	Kaiserganj (Lok Sabha)	Deve Gowda	
2		Minister of Communications (MoS(I/C) until 10 July 1996)	Beni Prasad Verma (1941–2020)	21 April 1997	19 March 1998	1 year, 263 days	Kaiserganj (Lok Sabha)	I.K. Gujral	
2		Minister of Communications (MoS)	Beni Prasad Verma (1941–2020)	1 June 1996	29 June 1996	28 days	Kaiserganj (Lok Sabha)	Deve Gowda	
2		Minister of Parliamentary Affairs (MoS)	Beni Prasad Verma (1941–2020)	1 June 1996	29 June 1996	28 days	Kaiserganj (Lok Sabha)	Deve Gowda	
3		Minister of Health and Family Welfare [MoS(I/C)]	Saleem Iqbal Shervani (born 1953)	29 June 1996	21 April 1997	345 days	Badaun (Lok Sabha)	Deve Gowda	
3		Minister of Health and Family Welfare [MoS(I/C)]	Saleem Iqbal Shervani (born 1953)	21 April 1997	9 June 1997	345 days	Badaun (Lok Sabha)	I.K. Gujral	
3		Minister of Health and Family Welfare (MoS)	Saleem Iqbal Shervani (born 1953)	1 June 1996	29 June 1996	28 days	Badaun (Lok Sabha)	Deve Gowda	
3		Minister of External Affairs (MoS)	Saleem Iqbal Shervani (born 1953)	9 June 1997	19 March 1998	283 days	Badaun (Lok Sabha)	I.K. Gujral	
4		Minister of Water Resource	Janeshwar Mishra (1933–2010)	29 June 1996	21 April 1997	345 days	Uttar Pradesh (Rajya Sabha)	Deve Gowda	
4		Minister of Water Resource	Janeshwar Mishra (1933–2010)	21 April 1997	9 June 1997	345 days	Uttar Pradesh (Rajya Sabha)	I.K. Gujral	
4		Minister of Petroleum and Natural Gas	Janeshwar Mishra (1933–2010)	9 June 1997	19 March 1998	283 days	Uttar Pradesh (Rajya Sabha)	I.K. Gujral	

== Prominent members ==
- Akhilesh Yadav, President of Samajwadi Party and former chief minister of Uttar Pradesh.
- Dimple Yadav, Member of Parliament from Kannauj
- Azam Khan, former Member of Parliament, 9 time MLA, Member of Parliament Loksabha Rampur former cabinet minister of Uttar Pradesh and former Member of Rajya Sabha from Uttar Pradesh.
- Janeshwar Mishra, former cabinet minister, Government of India. Former Member of Parliament, Lok Sabha.
- Shivpal Singh Yadav, Former State President of Samajwadi Party, Member of Legislative Assembly from Jaswantnagar – 6th term, Former Cabinet Minister(UP Govt.), Former Leader of Opposition
- Beni Prasad Verma, former Union Cabinet Minister of India
- Awadhesh Prasad, General Secretary of Samajwadi Party, Former Cabinet Minister of Uttar Pradesh, founding member, MP from Firozabad
- Kiranmoy Nanda, Vice President of Samajwadi Party
- Naresh Uttam Patel, Former Uttar Pradesh State president of Samajwadi Party.
- Professor Ram Gopal Yadav, Party Leader in Rajya Sabha
- Jaya Bachchan, Indian actress and Rajya Sabha MP from Uttar Pradesh.
- Ram Govind Chaudhary, Leader of opposition in Uttar Pradesh Legislative Assembly (2017-2022).
- Indrajit Saroj, National General Secretary, Deputy Leader of Opposition in Uttar Pradesh Legislative Assembly
- Balram Yadav, 5 times elected as Member of Legislative Assembly from Atraulia Assembly constituency and 4 times as Member of Legislative Council, Former Cabinet Minister (UP Govt.), He is prominent leader in purvanchal( Eastern Uttar Pradesh).
- Sanjay Lathar, former Leader of Opposition in Uttar Pradesh Legislative Council.
- Dr. Sangram Yadav, 3 times Member of the Legislative Assembly (India) from Atraulia Assembly constituency and Whip/sachetak of Samajwadi party vidhan mandal dal.
- Abu Asim Azmi, Samajwadi Party Maharashtra state President, Member of Maharashtra Legislative Assembly and former Member of Rajya Sabha.
- Mohan Singh, former Member of Parliament Rajya Sabha
- Harendra Singh Malik, former MP Rajya Sabha, prominent Jat leader from Western Uttar Pradesh.
- Pankaj Kumar Malik, MLA from Charthawal Assembly Seat.
- Vishambhar Prasad Nishad, Samajwadi Party General Secretary, former Rajya Sabha MP, former Member of Lok Sabha, and former Cabinet Minister of Uttar Pradesh.
- Balwant Singh Ramoowalia, Prominent Sikh leader and former cabinet minister of Uttar Pradesh.
- Anand Singh, leader, ex 5 time MP and MLA from Gonda district, and former Cabinet Minister of Agriculture from Uttar Pradesh Government, under Akhilesh Yadav from 2012 to 2014.

=== Party founder and former members ===
- Mulayam Singh Yadav, founder and former President of Samajwadi Party, former Defence minister of India and former Chief Minister of Uttar Pradesh.
- Anantram Jaiswal former Member of Parliament, Lok Sabha, Member of Parliament, Rajya Sabha, Minister and Samajwadi Ideologist, Founding member

== State leadership ==
- Abu Asim Azmi: Maharashtra
- Shyamlal Pal: Uttar Pradesh
- Dr.Manoj Yadav: Madhya Pradesh
- Satyanarayan Sachan: Uttarakhand
- Manjappa Yadav: Karnataka
- Devendra Upadhyaya: Gujarat
- Manas Bhattacharya: West Bengal
- Mukesh Yadav: Rajasthan
- Sukhvinder Singh: Punjab
- Dr Saji Pothen Thomas: Kerala
- B Jagadeesh Yadav: Andhra Pradesh
- Om Prakash Sahu:Chhattisgarh

== See also ==
- List of political parties in India
- Indian National Developmental Inclusive Alliance
