= Phulpur, Azamgarh =

Phulpur
- Town
- Location in Uttar Pradesh, India Phulpur (India)
- Coordinates: 26.0797738°N 82.3140931°E
- Country: India
- State: Uttar Pradesh
- District: Azamgarh
- Elevation: 81 m (266 ft)

Population (2011)
  - Total: 9,329

Language
  - Official: Hindi
  - Additional official: Urdu
- Time zone: UTC+5:30 (IST)
- Vehicle registration: UP-50

Phulpur is a town and a nagar panchayat in Azamgarh district in the Indian state of Uttar Pradesh.

== Geography ==
Phulpur is located at 26.079774°N 82.314093°E. It has an average elevation of 81 metres (265 feet).

== Demographics ==
As of 2001 India census, Phulpur had a population of 8,310. Males constitute 51% of the population and females 49%. Phulpur has an average literacy rate of 63%, higher than the national average of 59.5%: male literacy is 69%, and female literacy is 57%. In Phulpur, 18% of the population is under 6 years of age.

== Administration ==
The chairman of the Phulpur nagar panchayat is Ram Ashish Baranwal
