= Azamgarh =

City in Uttar Pradesh, India

- City
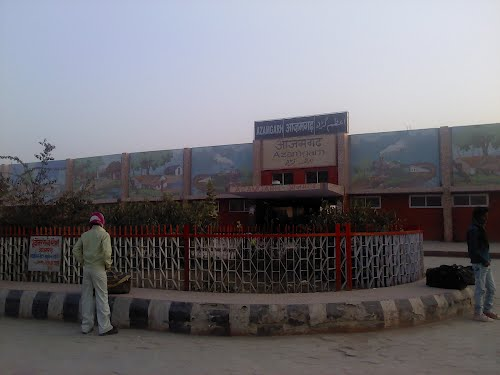
- Azamgarh Railway Station

- Location in Uttar Pradesh, India Azamgarh (India)
- Coordinates: 26.068°N 83.184°E
- Country: India
- State: Uttar Pradesh
- District: Azamgarh

Government
  - MLA: Durga Prasad Yadav (SP)
  - MP: Dharmendra Yadav (SP)
- Elevation: 64 m (210 ft)

Population (2011)
  - Total: 110,983

Language
  - Official: Hindi
  - Additional official: Urdu
  - Local: Bhojpuri
- Time zone: UTC+05:30 (IST)
- PIN: 276001
- Area code: 05462
- Vehicle registration: UP-50
- Airport: Azamgarh Airport
- Website: azamgarh.nic.in

Azamgarh is a city in the Indian state of Uttar Pradesh. It is the headquarters of Azamgarh division, which consists of Ballia, Mau and Azamgarh districts. Azamgarh is situated on the bank of Tamsa River (Tons). It is located 268 km (167 mi) east of the state capital Lucknow and 809 km from the national capital, Delhi.

== History ==
Azamgarh, one of the easternmost districts (a district in Purvanchal sub-region) of Uttar Pradesh, once part of the ancient Kosala kingdom, except its north-eastern part. Azamgarh is also known as the land of the sage Durvasa whose ashram was located in Phulpur tehsil, near the confluence of Tamsa and Majhuee rivers, 6 kilometres (3.7 mi) north of the Phulpur.

The district is named after its headquarters town, Azamgarh, which was founded in 1665 by Azam, son of Vikramajit. Vikramajit was a descendant of Gautam Rajputs of Mehnagar in Pargana Nizamabad who like some of his predecessors had embraced Islam. He had two sons, Azam and Azmat. While Azam gave his name to the town of Azamgarh, and the fort, Azmat constructed the fort and settled the bazaar of Azmatgarh pargana Sagri. After the attack of Chabile Ram, Azmat Khan fled northwards followed by the interior forces. He attempted to cross the Ghaghra into Gorakhpur, but the people on the other side opposed his landing, and he was either shot in mid stream or was drowned in attempting to escape by swimming.

In 1688 A.D. during Azmat's lifetime, his eldest son Ekram took part in the management of the state, and after Azam's death he was perhaps left in possession together with Mohhabat, another son. The remaining two sons were taken away and for a time detained as hostages for their brothers' 'good behaviour'.

The successor of Ikram finally confirmed the title of his family to the Jamidari. Ikram left no heirs and was succeeded by Iradat, son of Mohhabat. But the real ruler all along had been Mohhabat, and after Ikram's death, he continued to rule in his son's name.

== Geography ==
Azamgarh has an average elevation of 64 metres (209 feet). The district consists of a series of parallel ridges, whose summits are depressed into beds or hollows, along which the rivers flow, while between the ridges are low-lying rice lands, interspersed with numerous natural reservoirs. The soil is fertile, and very highly cultivated, bearing good crops of rice, sugarcane, and wheat and orchards of mango and guava. Maize, gram, corn, mustard are other major crops.

=== Climate ===
Azamgarh experiences a humid subtropical climate (Köppen climate classification Cwa) with large variations between summer and winter temperatures. Summers are long, from early April to October with intervening monsoon seasons, and are also extremely hot, even by South Asian standards. The temperature ranges between 22 and 46 °C (72 and 115 °F) in the summers. Winters in Azamgarh see very large diurnal variations, with warm days and downright cold nights. Cold waves from the Himalayan region cause temperatures to dip across the city in the winter from December to February and temperatures below 5 °C (41 °F) are not uncommon. The average annual rainfall is 1,110 mm (44 in). Fog is common in the winters, while hot dry winds, called loo, blow in the summers. In recent years, the water level of the Tamsa has decreased significantly.

Climate data for Azamgarh
Month	Jan	Feb	Mar	Apr	May	Jun	Jul	Aug	Sep	Oct	Nov	Dec	Year
Mean daily maximum °C (°F)	19 (67)	24 (76)	31 (87)	37 (98)	38 (100)	36 (97)	32 (90)	31 (88)	31 (88)	31 (87)	27 (81)	22 (71)	30 (86)
Mean daily minimum °C (°F)	8 (47)	12 (54)	17 (62)	22 (72)	25 (77)	27 (80)	26 (78)	26 (78)	24 (76)	21 (70)	15 (59)	11 (51)	20 (67)
Average precipitation mm (inches)	19.3 (0.76)	13.5 (0.53)	10.4 (0.41)	5.4 (0.21)	9.0 (0.35)	100.0 (3.94)	320.6 (12.62)	260.4 (10.25)	231.6 (9.12)	38.3 (1.51)	12.9 (0.51)	4.0 (0.16)	1,025.4 (40.37)

== Demographics ==
As per the 2011 census, Azamgarh urban agglomeration had a population of 110,983, out of which males were 57,878 and females were 53,105.

=== Literacy ===
The average literacy rate of Azamgarh town in 2011 was 70.93%, compared to 56.95% in 2001. Male and female literacy were 81.34% and 60.91% respectively. For the 2001 census, in Azamgarh district, the corresponding figures were 71.04% and 43.40%.

=== Religion ===
Religion in Azamgarh City (2011)
Religion	Percent
Hinduism	70.21%
Islam	29.06%
Other or not stated	0.73%

=== Languages ===
Languages in Azamgarh town (2011)
1. Hindi (45.2%)
2. Bhojpuri (37.5%)
3. Urdu (17.0%)
4. Others (0.33%)

At the time of the 2011 Census of India, 45.22% of the population recorded Hindi as their first language, while 37.46% recorded Bhojpuri and 16.99% Urdu.

== Transport ==
=== Road ===
Azamgarh is connected with Lucknow 268 km (167 mi) and Delhi 761 km (473 mi) by road. It has one of the biggest bus depots in eastern Uttar Pradesh and regular bus services to almost all district headquarters of Uttar Pradesh and also to Delhi. A new highway called the 'Purvanchal Expressway' was built in 2021 to directly connect Azamgarh with Lucknow and other important cities.

=== Train ===
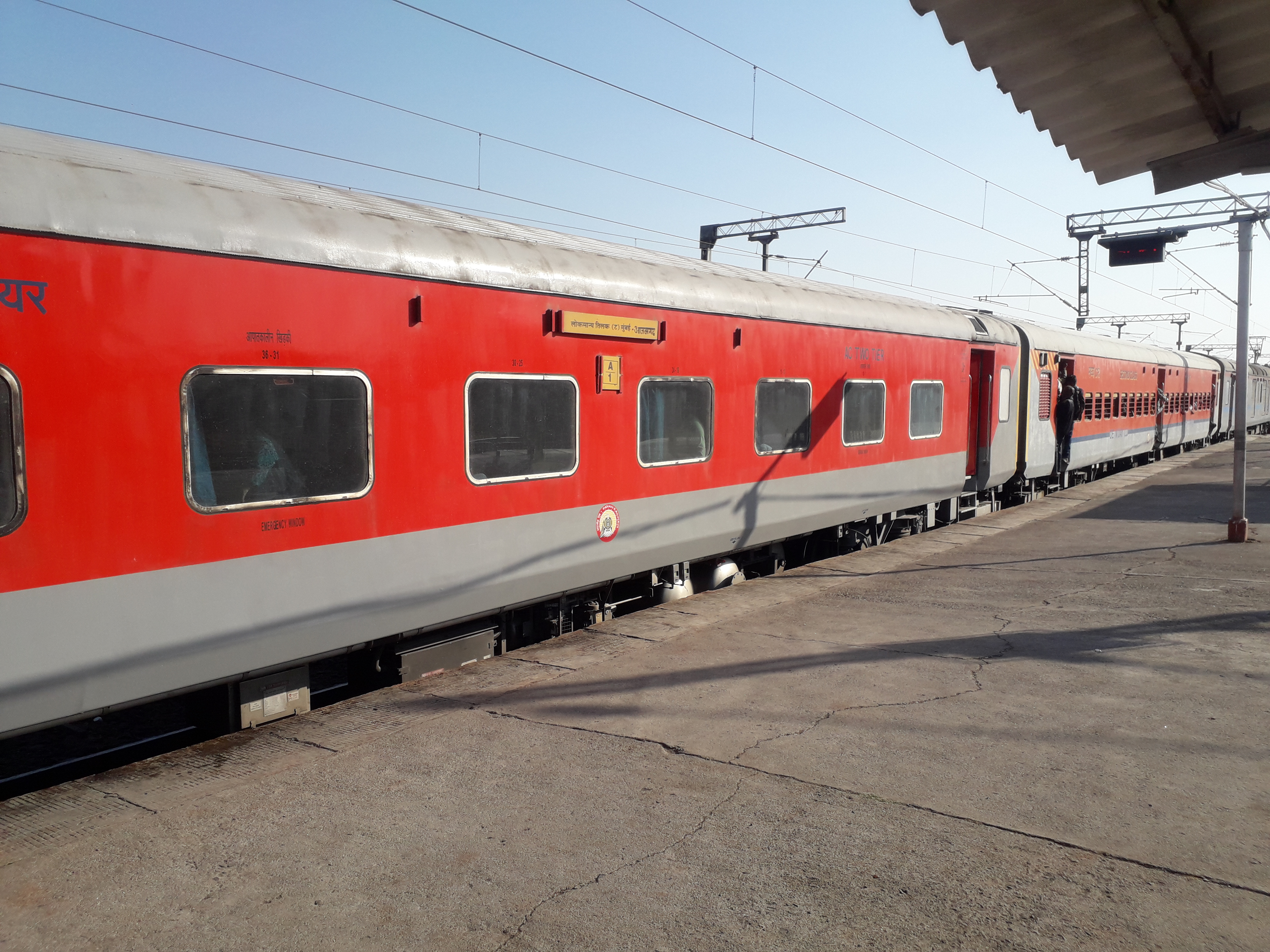
Azamgarh Mumbai LTT Weekly Express at Azamgarh station

Azamgarh station is one of the most important of eastern Uttar Pradesh. Azamgarh is directly connected to Delhi by Kaifiyat Express, to Mumbai by Mumbai LTT – Azamgarh Weekly Express, Godaan express, to Ahmedabad, the state capital Lucknow, Jaipur, Ajmer, and Amritsar, to Kolkata by KOAA AMH Express (13137).

=== Air ===
Azamgarh has a new airport Azamgarh Airport, 9 km (5.6 mi) from the city centre. It was inaugurated virtually by Prime Minister Narendra Modi on 10 March 2024. The domestic airport became operational the following day. FlyBig regulates the regular flights to Lucknow.

== Education ==
Azamgarh has a number of educational institutions ranging from basic educational institutions to the higher institution. There are a number of ITIs, Polytechnics, Nursing Schools, and medical college. Notable institutions include:

- Azamgarh State University, established in 2019.
- Government Medical College and Super Facility Hospital, Azamgarh is a state medical college located at Chakrapanpur, Azamgarh.
- Shibli National College offers graduate and postgraduate courses in Azamgarh. It is a well known institution established in 1883 by Shibli Nomani, an Islamic scholar from Indian subcontinent during British Raj.

== Media ==
=== FM ===
- Voice Of Azamgarh (90.8) Community Radio.
- Air Vividh Bharti (102.2) which Broadcast from Mau & Covers Azamgarh city too.
- Half Lemon Radio (90.4)

== Notable people ==
Azmi is a common toponymic surname among Indian Muslims from Azamgarh. (Note: Not to be confused with the similar Arabic surname meaning resolute or derived from azam (great) + -i.)

- Iqbal Abdulla (born 1989), Indian cricketer
- Abdul Haq Azmi (1928–2016), Indian Islamic scholar, cousin-uncle of Rana Ayyub
- Abdul Lateef Azmi (1917–2002), Indian Urdu writer
- Abu Azmi (born 1955), Indian politician, MLA from Maharashtra and former Member of Rajya Sabha
- Ahmad Ali Barqi Azmi (born 1954), Indian Urdu poet
- Azizullah Azmi (1929–2010), Indian politician, MP of Lok Sabha
- Baba Azmi, Indian film cinematographer, husband of Tanvi Azmi
- Habib al-Rahman al-'Azmi (1901-1992), Indian Islamic scholar of hadith and fiqh
- Iliyas Azmi (born 1934), Indian politician, MP of Lok Sabha
- Kaifi Azmi (1919–2002) was an Indian Urdu poet, husband of Shaukat Azmi and father of Shabana Azmi and Baba Azmi
- Khaleel-Ur-Rehman Azmi (1927–1978), Indian Urdu poet and literary critic
- Mohammed Badi Uzzaman Azmi (1939–2011), British-Pakistani television and film actor
- Muhammad Mustafa Azmi (1930–2017), Indian Islamic scholar of hadith
- Mushtaq Ahmed Azmi (1919–2011), Indian adult educationist and UNESCO official
- Obaidullah Khan Azmi (born 1949), Indian politician, MP of Rajya Sabha
- Seema Azmi, Indian actress of film and stage
- Shahid Azmi (1977–2010), Indian human rights lawyer
- Shakeel Azmi (born 1971), Indian Urdu lyricist and poet
- Waqar Azmi (born 1970), British-Indian civil servant
- Shaikh Shamim Ahmed Azmi (1938–2019), former MLA and Indian National Congress leader from Mumbai
- Qamaruzzaman Azmi (born 1946), Indian Islamic scholar
- Mirza Aslam Beg (born 1931), former Chief of Army Staff of Pakistan
- Rishi Das, entrepeneur
- Praveen Dubey (born 1993), Indian cricketer
- Amin Ahsan Islahi (1904–1997), Pakistani Islamic scholar, famous for his Urdu exegeses of Quran, Tadabbur-i-Qur'an
- Sadruddin Islahi (1917 - 1998) was an Indian Islamic Urdu writer and a close companion of Abul A'la Maududi. He was one of the early members of Jamat e Islami.
- Frank F Islam, American entrepreneur, civic leader and writer. General Trustee of the Board of Trustees of the John F. Kennedy Center for the Performing Arts in 2013
- Wahiduddin Khan (1925-2021), Islamic scholar and peace activist.
- Kanhaiya Lal Misra (1903–1975), Indian lawyer and independence activist, Advocate General of Uttar Pradesh from 1952 to 1969
- Saeed-ur-Rahman Azmi Nadvi (born 1934), Indian Islamic scholar
- Shibli Nomani (1857–1914) Indian Islamic scholar, historian, educationist and social reformer
- Prem Chand Pandey, Indian scientist, founder-director National Centre for Antarctic and Ocean Research
- Vibhuti Narain Rai (born, 1950), Writer, novelist, activist, translator, Director general of police (Retired)
- Shaukat Hussain Rizvi, filmmaker in India and Pakistan
- Ahmad Salahuddin (1937-1996), Indian biochemist, Founder Director of Interdisciplinary Biotechnology Unit at AMU in 1984.
- Rahul Sankrityayan (1893–1963), Indian writer, known as the father of Hindi travelogue
- Amar Singh (1956–2020), Indian politician former MP
- Gajendra Singh, Indian television producer
- Prakash Singh, Indian Police Service officer, who rose to the highest rank of Director General of Police (DGP).
- Vinod K. Singh (born 1959), Indian chemist, director Indian Institute of Science Education and Research, Bhopal, professor IIT Kanpur
- Iqbal Suhail (1884–1955), Indian Urdu poet
- Ayodhya Prasad Upadhyay (1865–1947), Indian writer, essayist, scholar, poet in Hindi
- Ram Naresh Yadav (1928–2016) Indian politician, Chief Minister of Uttar Pradesh from 1977 to 1979
- Ramakant Yadav (born 1957), Indian politician, MP of Lok Sabha

== See also ==
- Azamgarh alcohol poisonings
- List of cities in Uttar Pradesh
- Dewait
- Kohanda
