= Azamgarh district =

District in Uttar Pradesh, India

- District
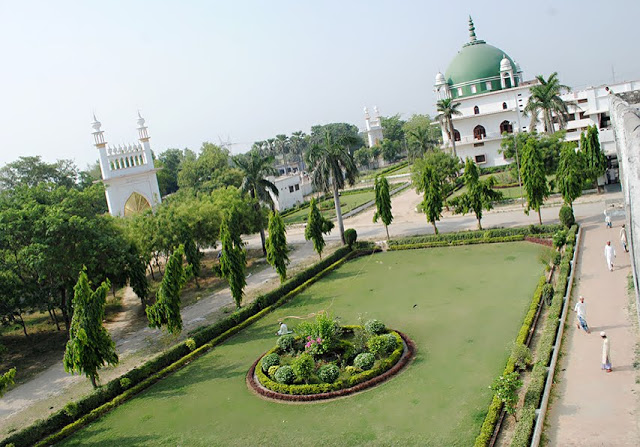
- Jamiatul Ashrafia in Azamgarh
- Nicknames: Land of Durvasa Muni
- Location of Azamgarh district in Uttar Pradesh
- Country: India
- State: Uttar Pradesh
- Division: Azamgarh
- Headquarters: Azamgarh

Government
  - Lok Sabha constituencies: Azamgarh, Lalganj

Area
  - Total: 4,054 km^{2} (1,565 sq mi)

Population (2011)
  - Total: 4,613,913
  - Density: 1,138/km^{2} (2,948/sq mi)
  - Urban: 8.53%

Demographics
  - Literacy: 70.93%
  - Sex ratio: 1019

Language
  - Official: Hindi
  - Additional official: Urdu
  - Regional: Bhojpuri
- Time zone: UTC+05:30 (IST)
- Major highways: National Highway 233B
- Website: azamgarh.nic.in

Azamgarh district is one of the three districts of Azamgarh division in the Indian state of Uttar Pradesh. The district headquarters is Azamgarh.

== Etymology ==
The district is named after its headquarters town, Azamgarh. Azam, a son of Vikramajit, founded the town in 1665. Vikramajit, a descendant of Gautam Rajputs of Mehnagar in pargana Nizamabad, had converted to Islam. He had two sons, namely, Azam and Azmat. It is also known as land of the sage Durvasa whose ashram was located in Phulpur sub-district, near the confluence of Tons and Majhuee river, 6 kilometres (4 mi) north from the Phulpur sub-district headquarters.

== History ==
Towards the end of the 16th century, a Gautam Rajput from Azamgarh district was assimilated into the Mughal court at Delhi, where he had gone in search of greater influence. His mission was a success, with the royal court eventually awarding him 22 parganas in the Azamgarh region that marked the establishment of a family line which culminated in his descendants becoming rajas of the area. This was a typical route whereby relatively obscure lineages rose to prominence.

=== Colonial era ===
The district was ceded to the British in 1801 by the wazirs of Lucknow. Both Hindu and Muslim landowners (known as Rautaras) of Azamgarh aided the Sepoy Mutiny against the British in 1857. On 3 June 1857 the 17th Regiment of Native Infantry mutinied at Azamgarh, murdered some of their officers, and carried off the government treasure to Faizabad. The district became a centre of the fighting between the Gurkhas and the rebels, and was brought under control in October 1858 by Colonel Kelly. The most notable rebels were Late. Janab Lal Mohammed Chivtahvin. Later, many of the local land owners were crushed by the British. Later, residents of Azamgarh participated in various national movements including the Civil Disobedience Movement and the Quit India Movement in 1942. The historian, social reformer, nationalist Mahapandit Rahul Sankrityayan was born in Kanaila village in this district.

== Geography ==
Azamgarh district has an area of 4,054 square kilometres (1,565 sq mi). The district lies between the Ganges and the Ghagahara. Azamgarh district is surrounded by the districts of Mau in the east, Gorakhpur in the north, Ghazipur in the south-east, Jaunpur in the south-west, Sultanpur in the west and Ambedkar Nagar in the north-west.

The slope of the land is from northwest to southeast. Roughly speaking, the district consists of a series of parallel ridges, whose summits are depressed into beds or hollows, along which the rivers flow; while between the ridges are low-lying rice lands, interspersed with numerous natural reservoirs.

Azamgarh district is further divided into 8 sub-districts, and 22 development blocks. There are 4,106 villages (3,792 inhabited and 314 uninhabited) in the district.

== Demographics ==
Historical population
Year	Pop.	±% p.a.
1901	1,103,469	—
1911	1,063,951	−0.36%
1921	1,089,471	+0.24%
1931	1,120,059	+0.28%
1941	1,298,992	+1.49%
1951	1,498,092	+1.44%
1961	1,690,536	+1.22%
1971	1,995,685	+1.67%
1981	2,493,757	+2.25%
1991	3,128,623	+2.29%
2001	3,939,916	+2.33%
2011	4,613,913	+1.59%

Religion in Azamgarh district (2011)
Religion	Percent
Hinduism	84.06%
Islam	15.58%
Other or not stated	0.36%

According to the 2011 census Azamgarh district has a population of 4,613,913. This gives it a ranking of 30th in India (out of a total of 640). The district has a population density of 1,139 inhabitants per square kilometre (2,950/sq mi). Its population growth rate over the decade 2001-2011 was 17.11%. Azamgarh has a sex ratio of 1019 females for every 1000 males, and a literacy rate of 72.69%. 8.53% of the population lives in urban areas. Scheduled Castes and Scheduled Tribes make up 25.39% and 0.20% of the population respectively.

Azamgarh district's total population was 3,939,916 as per 2001 census with population density of 972 inhabitants per square kilometre (2,520/sq mi). The population consists of 393,401 urban and 4,220,512 rural; 2,137,805 females and 2,082,707 males. The literacy rate is 70.93%.

=== Languages ===
The official language is Hindi and additional official is Urdu. Bhojpuri is the native language of Azamgarh. The Bhojpuri variant of Kaithi is the indigenous script of Bhojpuri language.

Languages in Azamgarh District (2011)
1. Bhojpuri (55.6%)
2. Hindi (35.3%)
3. Urdu (8.21%)
4. Others (0.93%)

At the time of the 2011 Census of India, 55.58% of the population in the district spoke Bhojpuri, 35.28% Hindi and 8.21% Urdu as their first language.

== Government and administration ==
=== Tehsil/Town in Azamgarh district ===
- Azamgarh
- Burhanpur
- Lalganj
- Mehnagar
- Nizamabad
- Phulpur
- Sagri
- Martinganj

=== Important places in Azamgarh district ===
According to the district's official website, the nine important places in Azamgarh district are:-

- Azamgarh City
- Nizamabad
- Maharajganj
- Mubarakpur
- Mehnagar
- Durvasa
- Dattatreya
- Govindsahab
- Avantikapuri (Awank)

== Economy ==
In 2006 the Ministry of Panchayati Raj named Azamgarh one of the country's 250 most backward districts (out of a total of 640). It is one of the 34 districts in Uttar Pradesh currently receiving funds from the Backward Regions Grant Fund Programme (BRGF).

== Education ==
=== Colleges ===
- Government Engineering College, Azamgarh, established in 2000 is a constituent college of Dr. A.P.J. Abdul Kalam Technical University (formerly Uttar Pradesh Technical University) and has its campus at Madan Mohan Malaviya University of Technology in Gorakhpur.
- Government Medical College, Azamgarh. established in 2006 is a state medical college located at Chakrapanpur, Azamgarh.
- Maharaja Suhel Dev University, Azamgarh The university was established in 2019.
- Shibli National College, Azamgarh, established in 1883.

== Local media ==
Mostly all major English, Hindi and Urdu dailies including The Times of India, Hindustan Times, The Hindu, Dainik Jagran, Amar Ujala, Hindustan, Rashtree Sahara, Inquilab, Hausla News, Third eyes, Dainik Manasha Mail. Hindi and Urdu dailies also have their bureaus in the city. Almost all big Hindi TV news channel have stringers in the city.

== Notable people ==
Notable people from Azamgarh district include:-
NB This list excludes those from Azamgarh itself which are listed in that article
Azmi is a common toponymic surname among Indian Muslims from Azamgarh. (Note: Not to be confused with the similar Arabic surname meaning resolute or derived from azam (great) + -i.)

- Abdul Haq Azmi (1928–2016), Indian Islamic scholar, cousin-uncle of Rana Ayyub
- Abdul Lateef Azmi (1917–2002), Indian Urdu writer
- Abu Azmi (born 1955), Indian politician, MLA from Maharashtra and former Member of Rajya Sabha
- Ahmad Ali Barqi Azmi (born 1954), Indian Urdu poet
- Azizullah Azmi (1929–2010), Indian politician, MP of Lok Sabha
- Baba Azmi, Indian film cinematographer, husband of Tanvi Azmi
- Habib al-Rahman al-'Azmi (1901-1992), Indian Islamic scholar of hadith and fiqh
- Iliyas Azmi (born 1934), Indian politician, MP of Lok Sabha
- Kaifi Azmi (1919–2002) was an Indian Urdu poet, husband of Shaukat Azmi and father of Shabana Azmi
- Khaleel-Ur-Rehman Azmi (1927–1978), Indian Urdu poet and literary critic
- Mohammed Badi Uzzaman Azmi (1939–2011), British-Pakistani television and film actor
- Muhammad Mustafa Azmi (1930–2017), Indian Islamic scholar of hadith
- Mushtaq Ahmed Azmi (1919–2011), Indian adult educationist and UNESCO official
- Obaidullah Khan Azmi (born 1949), Indian politician, MP of Rajya Sabha
- Seema Azmi, Indian actress of film and stage
- Shahid Azmi (1977–2010), Indian human rights lawyer
- Shakeel Azmi (born 1971), Indian Urdu lyricist and poet
- Waqar Azmi (born 1970), British-Indian civil servant
- Shaikh Shamim Ahmed Azmi (1938–2019), former MLA and Indian National Congress leader from Mumbai
- Qamaruzzaman Azmi (born 1946), Indian Islamic scholar
- Saeed-ur-Rahman Azmi Nadvi (born 1934), Indian Islamic scholar
- Mirza Aslam Beg - Chief of army staff of Pakistan Army in 1987–1991
- Bisram, Bhojpuri writer and poet
- Hamiduddin Farahi - religious scholar, educationist, writer, chief administrator of Madrasatul Islah - from Fariha village
- Amin Ahsan Islahi - Islamic scholar - from Bamhur village
- Aslam Jairajpuri - Islamic scholar
- Shamim Jairajpuri - zoologist
- Zafarul Islam Khan - Chairman of Delhi Minority Commission, Author and Journalist based in New Delhi. He is currently editor and publisher of The Milli Gazette
- Wahiduddin Khan - Indian Islamic Scholar and peace activist known for having written a commentary on the Quran and having translated it into contemporary English. He has been listed in the 500 Most Influential Muslims of the world. Padma Bhusan
- Chhannulal Mishra - Hindustani classical singer.
- Laxmi Narayan Mishra - modern Hindi dramatist
- Shibli Nomani - Islamic scholar
- Prem Chand Pandey - Indian scientist and academic
- Shyam Narayan Pandey - writer and poet - from Dumraon village, (now in Mau district but was in Azamgarh district at the time)
- Badri Nath Prasad, mathematician, founder of The Allahabad Mathematical Society
- Vibhuti Narain Rai - former IPS officer and former Vice-Chancellor - Mahatma Gandhi Antarrashtriya Hindi Vishwavidyalaya
- Ahmad Salahuddin (1937-1996), Indian biochemist, founder director of Interdisciplinary Biotechnology Unit at AMU in 1984.
- Rahul Sankrityayan - Hindi travel writer - from Kanaila Village
- Prakash Singh - DGP-Police, BSF Indian Police Reform movement (Honoured with Padma Shri Award and presidents Police Medal)
- Vinod K. Singh - (Padma Shri), director - Indian Institute of Science Education and Research, Bhopal.
- Ayodhya Prasad Upadhyay - Hindi poet - from Nizamabad
- Balram Yadav, Indian politician, MLC (Member of Legislative Council), former cabinet minister (Uttar Pradesh) and general secretary of Samajwadi Party
- Sangram Yadav - politician, MLA from Atraulia Assembly constituency
- Kausar Yazdani - Islamic scholar born 1935.

== See also ==
- Banahara
- Chaukiganjor
