= Azamgarh Assembly constituency =

Assembly constituency in Uttar Pradesh

Coordinates: 26.07°N 83.18°E

Azamgarh
- Constituency No. 347 for the Uttar Pradesh Legislative Assembly

Constituency details
- Country: India
- Region: North India
- State: Uttar Pradesh
- District: Azamgarh
- Lok Sabha constituency: Azamgarh
- Reservation: None

Member of Legislative Assembly
- 18th Uttar Pradesh Legislative Assembly
- Incumbent Durga Prasad Yadav
- Party: Samajwadi Party
- Elected year: 2022

Azamgarh is a constituency of the Uttar Pradesh Legislative Assembly covering the city of Azamgarh in the Azamgarh district of Uttar Pradesh, India.

Azamgarh is one of the 5 assembly constituencies in the Azamgarh Lok Sabha constituency. Since 2008, this assembly constituency is numbered 347 amongst 403 constituencies.

== Members of Legislative Assembly ==
Year	Member	Party
1957	Bisram	Praja Socialist Party
1962	Bhima Prasad	Praja Socialist Party
1967	Bhima Prasad	Samyukta Socialist Party
1969	Bhima Prasad	Samyukta Socialist Party
1974	Bisram	Bharatiya Kranti Dal
1977	Bhima Prasad	Indian National Congress
1980	Ram Kunwar Singh	Indian National Congress (Indira)
1985	Durga Prasad Yadav	Independent politician
1989	Durga Prasad Yadav	Janata Dal
1991	Durga Prasad Yadav	Janata Dal
1993	Raj Bali Yadav	Bahujan Samaj Party
1996	Durga Prasad Yadav	Samajwadi Party
2002	Durga Prasad Yadav	Samajwadi Party
2007	Durga Prasad Yadav	Samajwadi Party
2012	Durga Prasad Yadav	Samajwadi Party
2017	Durga Prasad Yadav	Samajwadi Party
2022	Durga Prasad Yadav	Samajwadi Party

== Election results ==
Vote share of winning candidates
2022	42.66%
2017	41.17%
2012	50.42%
2007	43.96%
2002	43.55%

=== 2027 ===
2027 Uttar Pradesh Legislative Assembly election: Azamgarh
Party	Candidate	Votes	%	±%
INDIA				
NDA				
BSP				
NOTA	None of the above			
Majority				
Turnout				
gain from		Swing		

=== 2022 ===
2022 Uttar Pradesh Legislative Assembly election: Azamgarh
Party	Candidate	Votes	%	±%
SP	Durga Prasad Yadav	100,813	42.66	+1.49
BJP	Akhilesh Kumar Mishra	84,777	35.87	+6.97
BSP	Sushil Kumar Singh	39,281	16.62	−10.58
AIMIM	Kamar Kamal	5,532	2.34	
INC	Praveen Kumar Singh	2,175	0.92	
NOTA	None of the above	1,470	0.62	−0.39
Majority		16,036	6.79	−5.48
Turnout		236,330	59.64	+2.59
SP hold		Swing		

=== 2017 ===
Samajwadi Party candidate Durga Prasad Yadav won in the last Assembly election of 2017 Uttar Pradesh Legislative Elections defeating Bharatiya Janta Party candidate Akhilesh Mishra by a margin of 26,262 votes.

2017 Uttar Pradesh Legislative Assembly election: Azamgarh
Party	Candidate	Votes	%	±%
SP	Durga Prasad Yadav	88,087	41.17	
BJP	Akhilesh Kumar Mishra	61,825	28.9	
BSP	Bhupendra	58,185	27.2	
NOTA	None of the above	2,134	1.01	
Majority		26,262	12.27	
Turnout		213,948	57.05	
SP hold		Swing		

=== 2012 ===
2012 Uttar Pradesh Legislative Assembly election: Azamgarh
Party	Candidate	Votes	%	±%
SP	Durga Prasad Yadav	93,629	50.42	+6.46
BSP	Sarvesh Kumar Singh Sipu	62,188	33.49	−1.90
BJP	Jai Nath	8,577	4.62	+0.44
INC	Karuna Kant Mishra	6,639	3.58	+0.09
Majority		31,441	16.93	+8.36
Turnout		185,680	54.41	
SP hold		Swing		

=== 2007 ===
2007 Uttar Pradesh Legislative Assembly election: Azamgarh
Party	Candidate	Votes	%	±%
SP	Durga Prasad Yadav	52,604	43.96	
BSP	Ramakant	42,350	35.39	
Independent	Dayaram	5,888	4.92	
BJP	Sunil Rai	5,005	4.18	
INC	Rajbali Yadav	4,172	3.49	
Majority		10,254	8.57	
Turnout		119,669		
SP hold		Swing		

=== 2002 ===
2002 Uttar Pradesh Legislative Assembly election: Azamgarh
Party	Candidate	Votes	%	±%
SP	Durga Prasad Yadav	55,586	43.55	
BSP	R. P. Rai	37,420	29.32	
BJP	Chhotelal Yadav	19,811	15.52	
INC	Ram Pratap Yadav	9,788	7.67	
Majority		18,166	14.23	
Turnout		127,634	49.40	
SP hold		Swing		
