= Azamgarh Lok Sabha constituency =

Lok Sabha Constituency in Uttar Pradesh

Coordinates: 26.06°N 83.19°E

Azamgarh UP-69
- Lok Sabha constituency
- Interactive Map Outlining Azamgarh Lok Sabha constituency

Constituency details
- Country: India
- Region: North India
- State: Uttar Pradesh
- Assembly constituencies: Gopalpur; Sagri; Mubarakpur; Azamgarh; Mehnagar
- Established: 1952
- Reservation: None

Member of Parliament
- 18th Lok Sabha
- Incumbent Dharmendra Yadav
- Party: Samajwadi Party
- Elected year: 2024

Azamgarh Lok Sabha constituency is one of the 80 Lok Sabha (parliamentary) constituencies in Uttar Pradesh state in northern India.

== Vidhan Sabha segments ==
Presently, Azamgarh Lok Sabha constituency comprises five Vidhan Sabha (legislative assembly) segments. These are:

No	Name	District	Member	Party	2024 Lead
344	Gopalpur	Azamgarh	Nafees Ahmad	SP	SP
345	Sagri	Azamgarh	Hriday Narayan Singh Patel	SP	SP
346	Mubarakpur	Azamgarh	Akhilesh Yadav	SP	SP
347	Azamgarh	Azamgarh	Durga Prasad Yadav	SP	SP
352	Mehnagar (SC)	Azamgarh	Puja Saroj	SP	SP

== Members of Parliament ==
Year	Name	Party
1952	Algu Rai Shastri	Indian National Congress
1957	Kalika Singh	Indian National Congress
1962	Ram Harakh Yadav	Indian National Congress
1967	Chandrajit Yadav	Indian National Congress
1971	Chandrajit Yadav	Indian National Congress
1977	Ram Naresh Yadav	Janata Party
1978^	Mohsina Kidwai	Indian National Congress (I)
1980	Chandrajit Yadav	Janata Party (Secular)
1984	Santosh Singh	Indian National Congress
1989	Ram Krishna Yadav	Bahujan Samaj Party
1991	Chandrajit Yadav	Janata Dal
1996	Ramakant Yadav	Samajwadi Party
1998	Akbar Ahmad	Bahujan Samaj Party
1999	Ramakant Yadav	Samajwadi Party
2004	Ramakant Yadav	Bahujan Samaj Party
2008^	Akbar Ahmad	Bahujan Samaj Party
2009	Ramakant Yadav	Bharatiya Janata Party
2014	Mulayam Singh Yadav	Samajwadi Party
2019	Akhilesh Yadav	Samajwadi Party
2022^	Dinesh Lal Yadav	Bharatiya Janata Party
2024	Dharmendra Yadav	Samajwadi Party

^ by-poll

== Results ==
Vote share of winning candidates
2024	48.20%
2022 (by-election)	34.39%
2019	60.04%
2014	35.43%
2009	35.13%

=== 2024 General Election ===
2024 Indian general elections: Azamgarh
Party	Candidate	Votes	%	±%
SP	Dharmendra Yadav	508,239	48.20	▲14.76
BJP	Dinesh Lal Yadav 'Nirahua'	3,47,204	32.93	▼1.51
BSP	Mashhod Sabeeha Ansari	1,79,839	17.05	▼11.77
NOTA	None of the Above	6,234	0.59	Steady
Majority		1,61,035	15.27	▲14.32
Turnout		10,54,520	56.45	▲7.09
SP gain from BJP		Swing		

=== 2022 by election ===
Bye-Elections, 2022: Azamgarh
Party	Candidate	Votes	%	±%
BJP	Dinesh Lal Yadav "Nirahua"	312,768	34.39	▼0.71
SP	Dharmendra Yadav	3,04,089	33.44	▼26.60
BSP	Shah Alam Urf Guddu Jamali	2,66,210	29.27	New
NOTA	None of the Above	5,369	0.59	▼0.11
Majority		8,679	0.95	▼24.29
Turnout		9,09,654	49.36	▼8.20
BJP gain from SP		Swing		

=== 2019 General Election ===
2019 Indian general elections: Azamgarh
Party	Candidate	Votes	%	±%
SP	Akhilesh Yadav	621,578	60.04	▲24.61
BJP	Dinesh Lal Yadav 'Nirahua'	3,61,704	35.1	▲6.25
SBSP	Abhimanyu Singh Sunny	10,078	1.0	N/A
RUC	Anil Singh	6,763	0.70	▼0.68
NOTA	None of the Above	7,255	0.70	▲0.11
Majority		2,59,874	25.24	▲18.66
Turnout		10,29,796	57.56	▲1.16
SP hold		Swing		

=== 2014 General Election ===
2014 Indian general elections: Azamgarh
Party	Candidate	Votes	%	±%
SP	Mulayam Singh Yadav	340,306	35.43	▲17.86
BJP	Ramakant Yadav	2,77,102	28.85	▼6.28
BSP	Shah Alam Urf Guddu Jamali	2,66,528	27.75	▼0.43
INC	Arvind Kumar Jaiswal	17,950	1.87	▼2.55
RUC	Aamir Rashadi Madni	13,271	1.38	▼7.03
NOTA	None of the Above	5,660	0.59	N/A
Margin of victory		63,204	6.58	▼0.37
Turnout		9,60,600	56.40	▲11.76
SP gain from BJP		Swing		

=== 2009 General Election ===
2009 Indian general elections: Azamgarh
Party	Candidate	Votes	%	±%
BJP	Ramakant Yadav	247,648	35.13	▲30.23
BSP	Akbar Ahmad Dumpy	1,98,609	28.18	▼8.12
SP	Durga Prasad Yadav	1,23,844	17.57	▼17.73
RUC	Dr. Javed Akhtar	59,270	8.41	New
INC	Santosh Kumar Singh	31,159	4.42	▼9.28
Margin of victory		49,039	6.95	▲5.95
Turnout		7,04,863	44.64	▼5.26
BJP gain from BSP		Swing		

== See also ==
- Azamgarh district
- List of constituencies of the Lok Sabha
