= Mubarakpur Assembly constituency =

Constituency of the Uttar Pradesh legislative assembly in India

Coordinates: 26.09°N 83.29°E

Mubarakpur
- Constituency No. 346 for the Uttar Pradesh Legislative Assembly

Constituency details
- Country: India
- Region: North India
- State: Uttar Pradesh
- District: Azamgarh
- Total electors: 3,54,153
- Reservation: None

Member of Legislative Assembly
- 18th Uttar Pradesh Legislative Assembly
- Incumbent Akhilesh Yadav
- Party: Samajwadi Party
- Elected year: 2022

Mubarakpur is a constituency of the Uttar Pradesh Legislative Assembly covering the city of Mubarakpur in the Azamgarh district of Uttar Pradesh, India.

Mubarakpur is one of five assembly constituencies in the Azamgarh Lok Sabha constituency. Since 2008, this assembly constituency is numbered 346 amongst 403 constituencies.

== Election results ==
=== 2027 ===
2027 Uttar Pradesh Legislative Assembly election: Mubarakpur
Party	Candidate	Votes	%	±%
INDIA				
AIMIM				
BJP				
BSP				
Majority				
Turnout				
gain from		Swing		

=== 2022 ===
2022 Uttar Pradesh Legislative Assembly election: Mubarakpur
Party	Candidate	Votes	%	±%
SP	Akhilesh Yadav	80,726	36.02	▼0.26
BJP	Arvind Jaiswal	51,623	23.03	▼0.02
BSP	Abdu Salam	48,734	21.74	▼14.9
AIMIM	Shah Alam	36,460	16.27	
NOTA	None of the above	1,349	0.60	▼0.25
Majority		29,103	12.99	▲12.63
Turnout		224,138	63.29	▲2.45
SP gain from BSP		Swing		

=== 2017 ===
2017 General Elections: Mubarakpur
Party	Candidate	Votes	%	±%
BSP	Shah Alam	70,705	36.64	
SP	Akhilesh Yadav	70,017	36.28	
BJP	Laxman Mourya	44,489	23.05	
NOTA	None of the above	1,628	0.85	
Majority		688	0.36	
Turnout		192,991	60.84	
BSP gain from SP		Swing		

== Members of the Legislative Assembly ==
Year	Member	Party
1962	Surjan	Communist Party of India
1967	Vishwanath	Indian National Congress
1969	Bhabhi	Samyukta Socialist Party
1974	Bhabhi	Bharatiya Kranti Dal
1977	Bhabhi	Janata Party
1980	Doodhnath	Indian National Congress
1985	Hafeez Bharti	Independent politician
1989	Yashwant Singh	Janata Dal
1991	A. Salam	Janata Dal
1993	Ram Darshan	Samajwadi Party
1996	Yashwant Singh	Bahujan Samaj Party
2002	Chandradev Ram Yadav	Bahujan Samaj Party
2007	Chandradev Ram Yadav	Bahujan Samaj Party
2012	Shah Alam	Bahujan Samaj Party
2017	Shah Alam	Bahujan Samaj Party
2022	Akhilesh Yadav	Samajwadi Party
