= Ram Harakh Yadav =

Indian politician

Member of Parliament, Lok Sabha
- In office 1962-1967
- Preceded by: Kalika Singh
- Succeeded by: Chandrajit Yadav
- Constituency: Azamgarh, Uttar Pradesh

Personal details
- Born: January 1895 Rampur Zabti, Azamgarh
- Party: Indian National Congress
- Spouse: Shanti Devi
- Children: 1
- Education: Banaras Hindu University (BA); University of Allahabad (LLB)

Ram Harakh Yadav was an Indian politician. He was elected to the Lok Sabha, the lower house of the Parliament of India as a member of the Indian National Congress. He completed his education from Banaras Hindu University in the year 1919.
