= Ram Surat Rajbhar =

Indian politician

Member of the Uttar Pradesh Legislative Council
- In office April 2023 – Present

Personal details
- Party: Bharatiya Janata Party
- Profession: Politician

Ram Surat Rajbhar is an Indian politician affiliated with the Bharatiya Janata Party (BJP). He has been serving as a Member of the Uttar Pradesh Legislative Council (MLC) since April 2023. His nomination was part of the BJP's strategy to strengthen its representation among the Rajbhar community, which holds significant influence in eastern Uttar Pradesh.

== Political career ==
Rajbhar contested the 2022 Uttar Pradesh Legislative Assembly election from the Phoolpur Pawai (Assembly constituency) in Azamgarh district, but he was defeated by Samajwadi Party candidate Ramakant Yadav (politician).
