= Ram Naresh Yadav ministry =

Government of Uttar Pradesh, India (1977–79)

- Ministry of Uttar Pradesh
- Date formed: 23 June 1977
- Date dissolved: 28 February 1979

People and organisations
- Chief Minister: Ram Naresh Yadav
- Member party: Janata Party
- Status in legislature: Majority government

In the 1977 Uttar Pradesh Legislative Assembly election, the Janata Party won 352 out of total 425 seats in the Indian state assembly. The leader of the Uttar Pradesh Janata legislative party was chosen through election. Ram Naresh Yadav secured 277 votes and became the leader. He was sworn in as Chief Minister of Uttar Pradesh on 23 June 1977 and served until 28 February 1979. Here are the names of ministers in his ministry:

== Council of ministers ==
Name	Office	Portfolio	Took office	Left office	Party
Ram Naresh Yadav	Chief Minister	Chief Minister	23 June 1977	28 February 1979	Janata Party
Ram Prakash Gupta	Cabinet minister		23 June 1977	28 February 1979	Janata Party
Satya Prakash Malaviya	Cabinet minister		23 June 1977	28 February 1979	Janata Party
Ravindra Kishore Sahi	Cabinet minister		23 June 1977	28 February 1979	Janata Party
Balbir Singh	Cabinet minister		23 June 1977	28 February 1979	Janata Party
Rajendra Singh	Cabinet minister	Minister of Agriculture	23 June 1977	28 February 1979	Janata Party
Ram Singh	Cabinet minister	Minister of Home	23 June 1977	28 February 1979	Janata Party
Kali Charan Yadav	Cabinet minister	Minister of Education	23 June 1977	28 February 1979	Janata Party
Keshari Nath Tripathi	Cabinet minister		23 June 1977	28 February 1979	Janata Party
Sharada Bhakta Singh	Cabinet minister		23 June 1977	28 February 1979	Janata Party
Mohammad Masood Khan	Cabinet minister		23 June 1977	28 February 1979	Janata Party
Kalyan Singh	Cabinet minister		23 June 1977	28 February 1979	Janata Party
Shree Chand	Cabinet minister		23 June 1977	28 February 1979	Janata Party
Harish Chandra Srivastva	Cabinet minister		23 June 1977	28 February 1979	Janata Party
Ganesh Dutt Bajpai	Cabinet minister	Minister of Local Self-government	23 June 1977	28 February 1979	Janata Party
Madhukar Dighe	Cabinet minister	Minister of Finance	23 June 1977	28 February 1979	Janata Party
Yamuna Prasad Bose	Cabinet minister	Minister of Rural Development and Panchayati Raj	23 June 1977	28 February 1979	Janata Party
Abid Ali Ansari	Cabinet minister		23 June 1977	28 February 1979	Janata Party
Mulayam Singh Yadav	Cabinet minister		23 June 1977	28 February 1979	Janata Party
Smt Chandra Vati Devi	Cabinet minister		23 June 1977	28 February 1979	Janata Party
Om Prakash	Cabinet minister		23 June 1977	28 February 1979	Janata Party
Chhote Lal Yadav	Cabinet minister		23 June 1977	28 February 1979	Janata Party
Laxman Singh	Minister of State		23 June 1977	28 February 1979	Janata Party
Avadhesh Singh	Minister of State		23 June 1977	28 February 1979	Janata Party
Dhirendra Sahai	Minister of State		23 June 1977	28 February 1979	Janata Party
Subedar Prasad	Minister of State		23 June 1977	28 February 1979	Janata Party
Shakuntala Nayar	Minister of State		23 June 1977	28 February 1979	Janata Party
Rewati Raman Singh	Minister of State		23 June 1977	28 February 1979	Janata Party
Muhammad Muhiuddin	Minister of State	Jail and Forest	23 June 1977	28 February 1979	Janata Party
Bhagavati Singh	Deputy minister		23 June 1977	28 February 1979	Janata Party
Babu Lal Verma	Minister of State	Rural Development	23 June 1977	28 February 1979	Janata Party
Shiv Das Tiwari	Deputy minister		23 June 1977	28 February 1979	Janata Party
Malti Sharma	Minister of State	Education	23 June 1977	28 February 1979	Janata Party
Chotelal Yadav	Minister of State	Irrigation and village development	23 June 1977	28 February 1979	Janata Party
Maq-bool H Khan	Deputy minister		23 June 1977	28 February 1979	Janata Party
Mukhtar Anis	Deputy minister		23 June 1977	28 February 1979	Janata Party
Tej Singh	Deputy minister		23 June 1977	28 February 1979	Janata Party
