= Ram Krishna Yadav =

Ram Krishna Yadav may refer to:

- Ram Krishna Yadav (Indian politician)
- Ram Krishna Yadav (Nepali politician)
