= Gopalpur, Uttar Pradesh Assembly constituency =

Constituency of the Uttar Pradesh legislative assembly in India

Coordinates: 26.04°N 80.64°E

Gopalpur
- Constituency No. 344 for the Uttar Pradesh Legislative Assembly

Constituency details
- Country: India
- Region: North India
- State: Uttar Pradesh
- District: Azamgarh
- Reservation: None

Member of Legislative Assembly
- 18th Uttar Pradesh Legislative Assembly
- Incumbent Nafees Ahmad
- Party: Samajwadi Party
- Elected year: 2022

Gopalpur is a constituency of the Uttar Pradesh Legislative Assembly covering the city of Gopalpur in the Azamgarh district of Uttar Pradesh, India.

Gopalpur is one of five assembly constituencies in the Azamgarh Lok Sabha constituency. Since 2008, this assembly constituency is numbered 344 amongst 403 constituencies.

== Election results ==
=== 2027 ===
2027 Uttar Pradesh Legislative Assembly election: Gopalpur
Party	Candidate	Votes	%	±%
INDIA				
NDA				
BSP				
NOTA	None of the above			
Majority				
Turnout				
gain from		Swing		

=== 2022 ===
2022 Uttar Pradesh Legislative Assembly election: Gopalpur
Party	Candidate	Votes	%	±%
SP	Nafees Ahmad	84,401	40.87	+3.37
BJP	Satyendra Rai	60,094	29.1	−0.49
BSP	Ramesh Chand Yadav	45,211	21.89	−6.78
AIMIM	Abdula	8,163	3.95	
VIP	Yogendra Yadav	2,201	1.07	
NOTA	None of the above	1,471	0.71	−0.1
Majority		24,307	11.77	+3.86
Turnout		206,518	58.94	+2.6
SP hold		Swing		

=== 2017 ===
2017 General Elections: Gopalpur
Party	Candidate	Votes	%	±%
SP	Nafees Ahmad	70,980	37.5	
BJP	Shrikrishna Pal	56,020	29.59	
BSP	Kamla Prasad Yadav	54,271	28.67	
CPI	Imteyaz Beg	2,351	1.24	
NOTA	None of the above	1,521	0.81	
Majority		14,960	7.91	
Turnout		189,300	56.34	
BJP gain from SP		Swing		

== Members of Legislative Assembly ==
#	Term	Member of Legislative Assembly	Party	From	To	Days	Comment
01	2nd Vidhan Sabha	Mukti Nath Rai	Indian National Congress	April 1957	March 1962	1,800	
02	3rd Vidhan Sabha	Uma Shanker	Praja Socialist Party	March 1962	March 1967	1,828	
03	4th Vidhan Sabha	Mukti Nath Rai	Indian National Congress	March 1967	April 1968	402	
04	5th Vidhan Sabha	Dal Singar	Samyukta Socialist Party	February 1969	March 1974	1,832	
05	6th Vidhan Sabha	Ram Adhar	Bharatiya Kranti Dal	March 1974	April 1977	1,153	
06	7th Vidhan Sabha	Ram Adhar	Janata Party	June 1977	February 1980	969	
07	8th Vidhan Sabha	Dal Singar	Indian National Congress (Indira)	June 1980	March 1985	1,735	
08	9th Vidhan Sabha	Qazu Kalimur Rahman	ICJ	March 1985	November 1989	1,725	
09	10th Vidhan Sabha	Gomti Yadav	Independent	December 1989	April 1991	488	
10	11th Vidhan Sabha	Dal Singar	Janata Dal	June 1991	December 1992	533	
11	12th Vidhan Sabha	Irshad	Bahujan Samaj Party	December 1993	October 1995	693	
12	13th Vidhan Sabha	Wasim Ahmad	Samajwadi Party	October 1996	March 2002	1,967	
13	14th Vidhan Sabha	Wasim Ahmad	Samajwadi Party	February 2002	May 2007	1,902	
14	15th Vidhan Sabha	Shyam Narayan	Bahujan Samaj Party	May 2007	March 2012	1,736	
15	16th Vidhan Sabha	Waseem Ahmad	Samajwadi Party	March 2012	March 2017	1,829	
16	17th Vidhan Sabha	Nafees Ahmad	Samajwadi Party	March 2017	Incumbent	3476	
