= Akbar Ahmad Dumpy =

Indian politician

Member of Parliament of Lok Sabha
- In office 2008–2009
- Preceded by: Ramakant Yadav
- Succeeded by: Ramakant Yadav
- Constituency: Azamgarh
- In office 1998–1999
- Preceded by: Ramakant Yadav
- Succeeded by: Ramakant Yadav
- Constituency: Azamgarh

Personal details
- Born: 30 June 1948 (age 78) Azamgarh, United Provinces, India
- Party: Bahujan Samaj Party
- Spouse: Naina Balsavar
- Education: The Doon School; Canning College

Akbar Ahmad Dumpy (born 30 June 1948) is an Indian politician and was member of the 12th and 14th Lok Sabha (1998–99) from Azamgarh Constituency in Uttar Pradesh state in India.

== Life and career ==
Akbar Ahmad Dumpy related to Allama Shibli Nomani completed his schooling from The Doon School and later went to Canning College. He was elected as Member of Uttar Pradesh Legislative Assembly in 1980 from Haldwani as member of Indira Congress. He was Sanjay Gandhi's friend and known as 'Dumpy' in his circle. When rivalry developed between Rajiv Gandhi and Maneka Gandhi's factions after Sanjay Gandhi's death in 1980, Indira Gandhi suspended Akbar Ahmad Dumpy, who was in Maneka camp, from Congress in 1982. When Maneka Gandhi launched Sanjay Vichar Manch in 1982, she appointed Akbar Ahmed as its convenor.

In 1987 Dumpy again got elected to Uttar Pradesh Legislative Assembly in a by-election from Kashipur Vidhan Sabha Constituency. As a candidate of Sanjay Vichar Manch, of Maneka Gandhi Dumpy defeated Indian National Congress candidate Ammar Rizvi.

Akbar Ahmad Dumpy was elected to the 12th Lok Sabha in 1998 from Azamgarh Constituency on a Bahujan Samaj Party ticket. Dumpy again got elected from Azamgarh Constituency on a Bahujan Samaj Party ticket.

He is the second husband of actor Naina Balsavar.
