= 1977 Uttar Pradesh Legislative Assembly election =

- 10 June 1977

All 425 seats in the Uttar Pradesh Legislative Assembly 213 seats needed for a majority
- Registered: 52,345,606
- Turnout: 46.14%
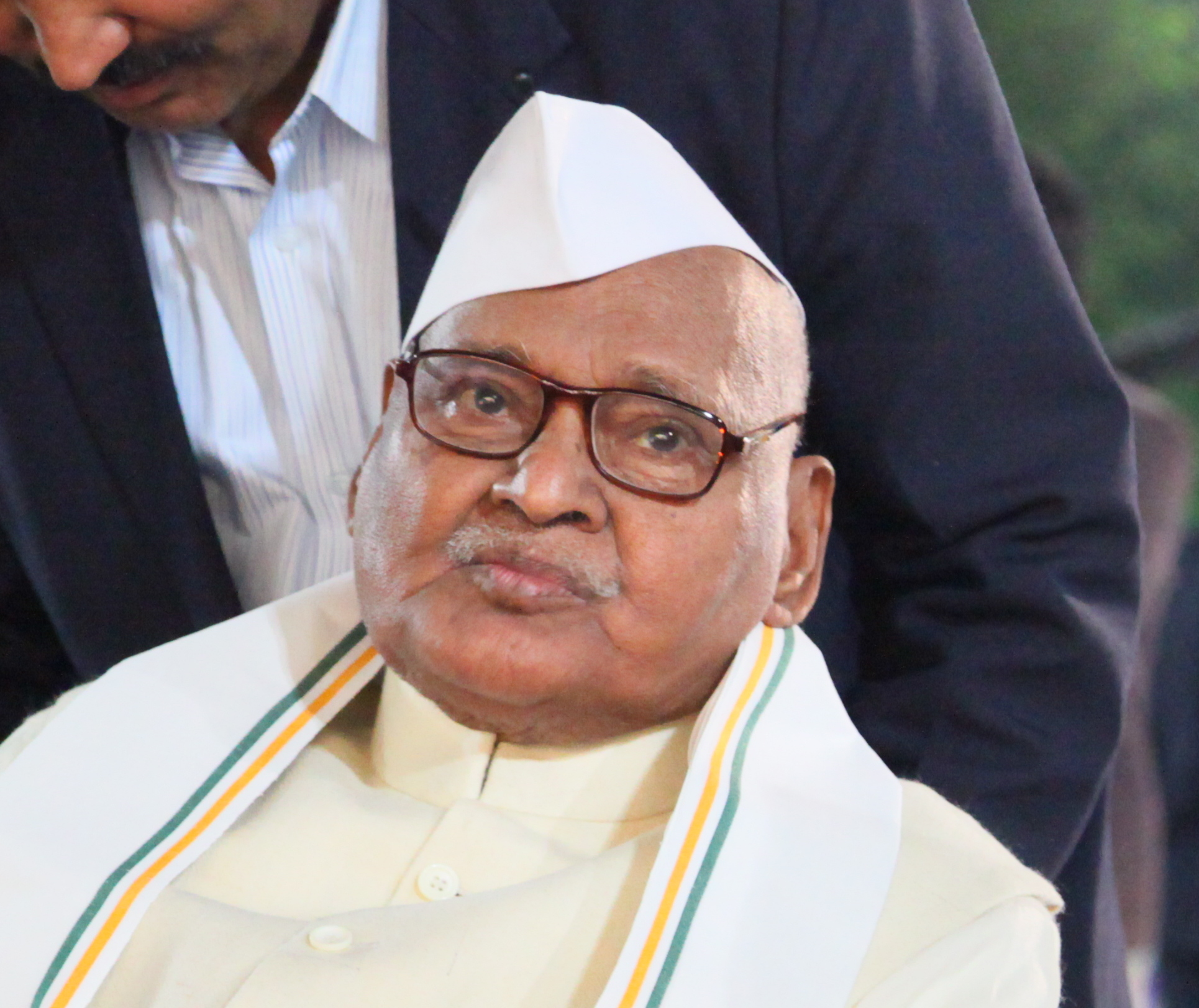

	Majority party	Minority party
Leader	Ram Naresh Yadav
Party	JP	INC(R)
Seats before	New	215
Seats won	352	47
Seat change	New	▼168
Popular vote	47.76%	31.94%
CM before election
President's Rule
Elected CM
Ram Naresh Yadav
JP

Elections to the Uttar Pradesh Legislative Assembly were held in June 1977 to elect members of the 425 constituencies in Uttar Pradesh, India. The Janata Party won a majority of seats and Ram Naresh Yadav was appointed the Chief Minister of Uttar Pradesh. The number of constituencies was set as 425 by the recommendation of the Delimitation Commission of India.

== Background ==
The previous elections to the Uttar Pradesh Legislative Assembly were held in February 1974, and the Indian National Congress won a majority and formed a Government headed by Hemwati Nandan Bahuguna. Bahuguna was forced to resign by Prime minister Indira Gandhi in 1975 and was replaced by N. D. Tiwari.

The term of the Assembly should have been for five years, until early 1979. The Forty-second Amendment of the Constitution of India, passed during The Emergency in 1976, lengthened the term to six years.

After Janata Party came to power in the 1977 Indian general election, the new government dissolved the state governments run by the Indian National Congress and declared fresh election in those states.

== Result ==
Party	Votes	%	Seats	+/–
Janata Party	11,351,359	47.76	352	New
Indian National Congress	7,592,107	31.94	47	–168
Communist Party of India	611,450	2.57	9	–7
Communist Party of India (Marxist)	136,850	0.58	1	–1
Shoshit Samaj Dal (Akhik Baharatiya)	74,680	0.31	–	–
Republican Party of India (Khobragade)	67,497	0.28	–	–
Muslim League	48,238	0.20	–	–
Republican Party of India	19,239	0.08	–	–
Akhil Bharat Hindu Mahasabha	10,318	0.04	–	–
All India Forward Bloc	8,543	0.04	–	–
Akhil Bharatiya Ram Rajya Parishad	7,175	0.03	–	–
Revolutionary Socialist Party	3,027	0.01	–	–
Socialist Unity Centre of India	2,079	0.01	–	–
Uttar Pradesh Kisan Mazdoor Party	1,025	0.00	–	–
Independents	3,832,832	16.13	16	+12
Total	23,766,419	100.00	425	+1
Valid votes	23,766,419	98.40		
Invalid/blank votes	386,237	1.60		
Total votes	24,152,656	100.00		
Registered voters/turnout	52,345,606	46.14		
Source: ECI

== Elected members ==
Constituency	Reserved for (SC/ST/None)	Member	Party
Uttarkashi	SC	Barfia Lal	Janata Party
Tehri	None	Govind Singh Negi	Communist Party of India
Deoprayag	None	Indramani Badoni	Independent
Lansdowne	None	Bharat Singh	Janata Party
Pauri	None	Bhagwati Charan Nirmohi	Janata Party
Karanprayag	None	Shivanand Nautiyal	Janata Party
Badrikedar	None	Pratap Singh	Janata Party
Didihat	None	Narayan Singh Bhainsora	Janata Party
Pithoragarh	None	Kamal Kishan Pandey	Janata Party
Almora	None	Shoban Singh Jina	Janata Party
Bageshwar	SC	Pooran Chandra	Janata Party
Ranikhet	None	Govind Singh Mehra	Janata Party
Nainital	None	Ram Datt Joshi	Janata Party
Khatima	None	Srichandra	Janata Party
Haldwani	None	Deo Bahadur Singh	Indian National Congress
Kashipur	None	Narain Datt	Indian National Congress
Seohara	None	Abdul Waheed	Janata Party
Dhampur	None	Haripal Singh Shastri	Janata Party
Afzalgarh	None	M. Jaleel Ahmad	Janata Party
Nagina	SC	Mangal Ram Premi	Janata Party
Nazibabad	SC	Mukandi Singh	Janata Party
Bijnor	None	Kunwar Satya Vir	Janata Party
Chandpur	None	Dharam Vir Singh	Janata Party
Kanth	None	Hargovind Singh	Janata Party
Amroha	None	Leelwat Singh	Janata Party
Hasanpur	None	Rama Shanker Kaushik	Janata Party
Gangeshwari	SC	Hardev Singh	Janata Party
Sambhal	None	Shafiqur-rehman Barq	Janata Party
Bahjoi	None	Sultan Singh	Janata Party
Chandausi	SC	Karan Singh	Janata Party
Kundarki	None	Akbar Husain	Janata Party
Moradabad West	None	Khiali Ram Shastri	Janata Party
Moradabad	None	Dinesh Chandra Rastogi	Janata Party
Moradabad Rural	None	Riyasat Husain	Independent
Thakurdwara	None	Mukeemur Rehman	Janata Party
Suartanda	None	Maqbool Ahmad	Indian National Congress
Rampur	None	Manzoor Ali Khan Alias Shannu Khan	Indian National Congress
Bilaspur	None	Sohan Lal	Janata Party
Shahabad	SC	Jagan Singh	Janata Party
Bisauli	None	Brij Ballabh	Independent
Gunnour	None	Sheoraj Singh	Independent
Sahaswan	None	Naresh Pal Singh Yadav	Janata Party
Bilsi	SC	Son Pal Alias Sphan Lal Pippal	Janata Party
Budaun	None	Krishan Swaroop	Janata Party
Usehat	None	Bhagwan Singh Shakya	Janata Party
Binawar	None	Ali Asghar Husain	Janata Party
Dataganj	None	Avenesh Kumar Singh	Janata Party
Aonla	None	Shiam Bihari Singh	Janata Party
Sunha	None	Rameshwar Nath Chaubey	Indian National Congress
Faridpur	SC	Sia Ram Sagar	Janata Party
Bareilly Cantonment	None	Ashfaq Ahmad	Indian National Congress
Bareilly City	None	Satya Prakash	Janata Party
Nawabganj	None	Chatram Gangwar S/o Karhey Ram	Indian National Congress
Bhojipura	None	Hamid Raza Khan	Independent
Kawar	None	Acharya Dharam Dutt Vaidya	Indian National Congress
Baheri	None	Rafiq Ahmad Khan	Indian National Congress
Pilibhit	None	Dhirendra Sahai	Janata Party
Barkhera	SC	Kishan Lal	Janata Party
Bisalpur	None	Munendra Pal Singh	Janata Party
Puranpur	None	Baboo Ram Prabhati	Janata Party
Powayan	SC	Suraj Prasad	Janata Party
Nigohi	None	Jagdish Singh	Indian National Congress
Tilhar	None	Satya Pal Singh	Indian National Congress
Jalalabad	None	Kanhai Singh	Independent
Dadraul	None	Mansoor Ali	Independent
Shahjahanpur	None	Mohd. Rafi Khan	Janata Party
Mohammadi	SC	Manna Lal	Janata Party
Haiderabad	None	Raghav Ram Misra	Janata Party
Paila	None	Nanga Ram	Janata Party
Lakhimpur	None	Naresh Chandra	Janata Party
Srinagar	None	Raj Brij Raj Singh	Janata Party
Nighasan	None	Ram Charan Shah	Janata Party
Dhaurehara	None	Jagannath Prasad	Independent
Behta	None	Mukhtar Anis	Janata Party
Biswan	None	Gaya Prasad Mehrotra Alias Manney Babu	Janata Party
Mahmoodabad	None	Ram Narain Verma	Janata Party
Sidhauli	SC	Ganesh Lal Chaudhari Vakil S/o Moolchand	Janata Party
Laharpur	None	Abid Ali	Janata Party
Sitapur	None	Rajendra Kumar	Janata Party
Hargaon	SC	Gokaran Prasad	Janata Party
Misrikh	None	Ram Ratan Singh	Indian National Congress
Machhrehta	SC	Lal Das	Janata Party
Beniganj	SC	Binari Lal Hans	Indian National Congress
Sandila	None	Kudsai Begam	Independent
Ahirori	SC	Manni Lal	Indian National Congress
Hardoi	None	Dharmgaj Singh	Indian National Congress
Bawan	SC	Puran Lal	Indian National Congress
Pihani	None	Ashok Bajpai	Janata Party
Shahabad	None	Brij Ballabh Singh	Independent
Bilgram	None	Sharda Bhakt Singh	Janata Party
Mallawan	None	Ram Asrey	Independent
Bangarmau	None	Jagdish Prasad Trivedi	Janata Party
Safipur	SC	Sunder Lal	Janata Party
Unnao	None	Chandra Pal Singh	Janata Party
Hadha	None	Hemraj	Janata Party
Bhagwant Nagar	None	Deoki Nandan	Janata Party
Purwa	None	Chandra Bhushan Singh	Janata Party
Hasanganj	SC	Chandra Pal	Janata Party
Malihabad	SC	Man Singh Azad	Janata Party
Mohana	None	Bhagauti Singh	Janata Party
Lucknow East	None	Swaroop Kumari Bakshi	Indian National Congress
Lucknow West	None	D. P. Bora	Janata Party
Lucknow Central	None	Ram Prakash	Janata Party
Lucknow Cantonment	None	Krishna Kant Misra	Janata Party
Sarojini Nagar	None	Chheda Singh Chauhan	Janata Party
Mohanlalganj	SC	Sant Baksh	Janata Party
Bachhrawan	SC	Ram Dulare	Indian National Congress
Tiloi	None	Mohan Singh	Indian National Congress
Rae Bareli	None	Mohan Lal Tripathi	Indian National Congress
Sataon	None	Ram Deo Yadav	Indian National Congress
Sareni	None	Sunita Chauhan	Indian National Congress
Dalmau	None	Munnoo Lal Divedi	Indian National Congress
Salon	SC	Deena Nath Sewak	Janata Party
Kunda	None	Shashi Prabha	Janata Party
Bihar	SC	Babu Lal	Janata Party
Rampurkhas	None	Kunwar Tejbhan Singh	Independent
Garwara	None	Vidaya Shanker	Janata Party
Pratapgarh	None	Sangam Lal	Janata Party
Birapur	None	Ram Dev Dubey	Janata Party
Patti	None	Rajpati Misra	Janata Party
Amethi	None	Haricharan Yadav	Janata Party
Gauriganj	None	Tej Bhan Singh	Janata Party
Jagdishpur	SC	Ram Pher Kori	Janata Party
Isauli	None	Ram Baran Verma	Janata Party
Sultanpur	None	Jitendra Kumar Agarwal	Janata Party
Jaisinghpur	None	Maqbool Husain Khan	Janata Party
Chanda	None	Udai Pratap Singh	Janata Party
Kadipur	SC	Brij Lal	Janata Party
Katehari	None	Ravindra Nath Tewari	Janata Party
Akbarpur	None	Hari Ram Verma	Janata Party
Jalalpur	None	Bhagauti Prasad	Communist Party of India
Jahangirganj	SC	Ramrati Devi	Janata Party
Tanda	None	Abdul Hafeez	Janata Party
Ayodhya	None	Jai Shanker Pandey	Janata Party
Bikapur	None	Sri Ram Dwivedi	Janata Party
Milkipur	None	Mitra Sen	Communist Party of India
Sohawal	SC	Avdhesh Prasad	Janata Party
Rudauli	None	Pradeep Kumar Yadav	Janata Party
Dariyabad	SC	Asharfi Lal	Janata Party
Sidhaur	None	Ram Sagar	Janata Party
Haidergarh	None	Sunder Lal	Independent
Masauli	None	Beni Prasad	Janata Party
Nawabganj	None	Mohd. Shamim Ansari	Janata Party
Fatehpur	SC	Nanhey Lal Kureel	Janata Party
Ramnagar	None	Masudal Hasan Nomani	Janata Party
Kaiserganj	None	Babu Lal Verma	Janata Party
Fakharpur	None	Shakuntla Nayar	Janata Party
Mahsi	None	Sukhad Raj Singh	Janata Party
Nanpara	None	Fazlur Rehman Ansari	Communist Party of India
Charda	SC	Gajadhar Prasad	Janata Party
Bhinga	None	Kamla Prasad Verma	Janata Party
Bahraich	None	Khan Mohd. Atif Khan	Janata Party
Ikauna	SC	Vishnu Dayal	Janata Party
Gainsari	None	Vindu Lal	Janata Party
Tulsipur	None	Mangal Deo	Indian National Congress
Balrampur	None	Ashfaq	Janata Party
Utraula	None	Rajendra Prasad Chaudhary	Janata Party
Sadullah Nagar	None	Dashrath Singh	Janata Party
Mankapur	SC	Ganga Prasad	Indian National Congress
Mujehna	None	Vishnu Pratap Singh	Janata Party
Gonda	None	Fajulal Bari Alias Bone Bhai	Janata Party
Katra Bazar	None	Deep Narain	Janata Party
Colonelganj	None	Triveni Singh	Janata Party
Dixir	SC	Ram Pati	Janata Party
Harraiya	None	Sukhpal Pandey	Janata Party
Captainganj	None	Om Parkash Alias Milan Singh	Janata Party
Nagar East	SC	Girdhari Lal	Janata Party
Basti	None	Jagdamba Prasad Singh	Janata Party
Ramnagar	None	Babu Ram Verma	Janata Party
Domariaganj	None	Malik Mohd. Kamal Yusuf	Janata Party
Itwa	None	Vishwa Nath Pandey	Janata Party
Shohratgarh	None	Sheo Lal Mittal	Janata Party
Naugarh	None	Mathura Prasad Pandey	Indian National Congress
Bansi	None	Harish Chandra Alias Harish Ji	Janata Party
Khesraha	None	Diwakar Vikram Singh	Janata Party
Menhdawal	None	Chandra Shekhar Singh	Janata Party
Khalilabad	SC	Ram Asrey	Janata Party
Hainsarbazar	SC	Bhisham	Janata Party
Bansgaon	SC	Babu Lal	Janata Party
Dhuriapar	None	Jagdish Prasad	Janata Party
Chillupar	None	Kalp Nath Singh	Janata Party
Kauriram	None	Rarvinder	Janata Party
Mundera Bazar	SC	Sharda Devi	Janata Party
Pipraich	None	Madhukar Didhe	Janata Party
Gorakhpur	None	Avdhesh Kumar Shrivastava	Janata Party
Maniram	None	Avedya Nath	Janata Party
Sahjanwa	None	Sharda Prasad Rawat	Janata Party
Paniara	None	Gunjeshwar	Independent
Pharenda	None	Shyam Narain Tewari	Communist Party of India
Luxmipur	None	Abdul Rauf Lari	Janata Party
Siswa	None	Sharda Prasad Jaiswal	Janata Party
Maharajganj	SC	Dukhi Prasad	Independent
Shyamdeurawa	None	Janardan Prasad Ojha	Janata Party
Naurangia	SC	Bhulai Bhai	Janata Party
Ramkola	None	Bankey Lal	Janata Party
Hata	SC	Basant	Janata Party
Padrauna	None	Purushottam Kaushik	Janata Party
Seorahi	None	Kripashanker Arya	Janata Party
Fazilnagar	None	Ramesh Naresh Pandey	Janata Party
Kasia	None	Rajmangal Pandey	Janata Party
Gauri Bazar	None	Virender	Janata Party
Rudrapur	None	Pradeep Kumar	Janata Party
Deoria	None	Krishna Rai	Janata Party
Bhatpar Rani	None	Raj Mangal	Janata Party
Salempur	None	Hari Kewal Prasad	Janata Party
Barhaj	None	Mohan Singh	Janata Party
Nathupur	None	Jagdish	Janata Party
Ghosi	None	Vikrama Rai	Janata Party
Sagri	None	Ram Janam	Janata Party
Gopalpur	None	Ramadhar	Janata Party
Azamgarh	None	Bhima Prasad	Indian National Congress
Nizamabad	None	M. Masaud	Janata Party
Atraulia	None	Durg Vijai	Indian National Congress
Phulpur	None	Padmakar	Janata Party
Saraimir	SC	Daya Ram Bhasker	Janata Party
Mehnagar	SC	Bhuddhoo	Janata Party
Lalganj	None	Ish Dutt	Janata Party
Mubarakpur	None	Bhabhi	Janata Party
Muhammadabad Gohna	SC	Sheo Prasad	Janata Party
Mau	None	Ramji	Janata Party
Rasra	SC	Mannu Ram	Janata Party
Siar	None	Rafiullah	Janata Party
Chilkahar	None	Ram Govin	Janata Party
Sikanderpur	None	Sheo Mangal Singh	Janata Party
Bansdih	None	Bachcha Pathak	Indian National Congress
Doaba	None	Manager Singh	Janata Party
Ballia	None	Shambhu Nath Choudhari	Janata Party
Kopachit	None	Gauri Shanker	Janata Party
Zahoorabad	None	Jairam	Communist Party of India
Mohammadabad	None	Ram Janam Rai	Janata Party
Dildarnagar	None	Avadhesh Narain	Janata Party
Zamania	None	Dharam Ram	Janata Party
Ghazipur	None	Mohd. Khalilullan Kuraishi	Janata Party
Jakhania	SC	Dev Ram	Janata Party
Sadat	None	Kali Charan	Janata Party
Saidpur	None	Udai Narain	Janata Party
Dhanapur	None	Kailash Nath	Janata Party
Chandauli	None	Ram Pyare	Janata Party
Chakiya	SC	Shyam Deo	Janata Party
Mughalsarai	None	Ganji Prasad	Janata Party
Varanasi Cantonment	None	Shatroodh Prakash	Janata Party
Varanasi South	None	Raj Bali Tiwari	Janata Party
Varanasi North	None	Mushtaq Ahmed	Janata Party
Chiraigaon	None	Udai Nath	Janata Party
Kolasla	None	Udal	Communist Party of India
Gangapur	None	Baldeo	Janata Party
Aurai	None	Bechuram	Janata Party
Gyanpur	None	Shyamdhar Mishra	Indian National Congress
Bhadohi	SC	Mithai Lal	Janata Party
Barsathi	None	Ram Krishan	Indian National Congress
Mariahu	None	Raj Kishore	Indian National Congress
Kerakat	SC	Shambhu Nath	Janata Party
Bayalsi	None	Chandra Sen	Indian National Congress
Jaunpur	None	Kamala Prasad Singh	Indian National Congress
Rari	None	Raj Bahadur Yadava	Janata Party
Shahganj	SC	Chhotey Lal	Janata Party
Khutahan	None	Lakshmi Shanker	Indian National Congress
Garwara	None	Ram Shiromani	Indian National Congress
Machhlishahr	None	Arun Kumar	Indian National Congress
Dudhi	SC	Ishwar Prasad	Janata Party
Robertsganj	SC	Subedar Prasad	Janata Party
Rajgarh	None	Rajnarain	Janata Party
Chunar	None	Om Prakash	Janata Party
Majhwa	None	Shivdas	Janata Party
Mirzapur	None	Raj Nath Singh	Janata Party
Chhanbey	SC	Purushottam Das	Indian National Congress
Meja	SC	Jawahar Lal	Janata Party
Karchana	None	Rewati Raman Singh (maniji)	Janata Party
Bara	None	Guru Prasad	Janata Party
Jhusi	None	Keshari Nath Tripathi	Janata Party
Handia	None	Athai Ram	Janata Party
Pratappur	None	Har Pratap Singh	Janata Party
Soraon	None	Jang Bahadur Singh Patel	Janata Party
Nawabganj	None	Muzaffer Hasan	Janata Party
Allahabad North	None	Baba Ram Adhar Yadav	Janata Party
Allahabad South	None	Satya Prakash Malviya	Janata Party
Allahabad West	None	Habib Ahmad	Janata Party
Chail	SC	Kanhaiya Lal Sonkar	Janata Party
Manjhanpur	SC	Nathu Ram Shikshak	Janata Party
Sirathu	SC	Baij Nath Prasad Kushwaha	Janata Party
Khaga	None	Chhotey Lal	Janata Party
Kishunpur	SC	Jageshwar	Janata Party
Haswa	None	Umakant Bajpayee Alias Bhaiya Ji	Janata Party
Fatehpur	None	Khan Ghufran Zahidi	Janata Party
Jahanabad	None	Quasim Hasan	Janata Party
Bindki	None	Jagannath Singh	Janata Party
Aryanagar	None	Babu Badre	Janata Party
Sisamau	SC	Moti Ram	Janata Party
Generalganj	None	Reoti Raman Rastogi	Janata Party
Kanpur Cantonment	None	Babu Ram Shukla	Janata Party
Govind Nagar	None	Ganesh Dutt Vajpayee	Janata Party
Kalyanpur	None	Pushpa Talwar	Janata Party
Sarsaul	None	Jauhari Lal	Janata Party
Ghatampur	None	Ram Asrey	Janata Party
Bhognipur	SC	Mauji Lal Kureel	Janata Party
Rajpur	None	Ashwani Kumar Chaturvedi Rakesh	Janata Party
Sarvankhera	None	Prabhu Dayal Yadav	Janata Party
Chaubepur	None	Hari Krishna Srivastava	Janata Party
Bilhaur	SC	Moti Lal Dehlvi	Janata Party
Derapur	None	Bhagwan Deen Kushwaha	Janata Party
Auraiya	None	Bharat Singh Chauhan	Janata Party
Ajitmal	SC	Gauri Shankar	Janata Party
Lakhna	SC	Ram Lakhan	Janata Party
Etawah	None	Satya Deo Tripathi	Janata Party
Jaswantnagar	None	Mulayam Singh Yadav	Janata Party
Bharthana	None	Mahendra Singh	Janata Party
Bidhuna	None	Asuan Singh	Janata Party
Kannauj	SC	Jhan Lal Ahirwar	Janata Party
Umarda	None	Ram Bux	Janata Party
Chhibramau	None	Banshgopal Chaubey	Janata Party
Kamalganj	None	Anwar Ahmad	Janata Party
Farrukhabad	None	Braham Datt Dwivedi	Janata Party
Kaimganj	None	Girish Chandra Tiwari	Janata Party
Mohammdabad	None	Rajendra Singh Yadav	Indian National Congress
Manikpur	SC	Ramesh Chand	Janata Party
Karwi	None	Ram Sajiwan	Communist Party of India
Baberu	None	Deo Kumar	Communist Party of India
Tindwari	None	Jagannath Singh	Janata Party
Banda	None	Jamuna Prasad	Janata Party
Naraini	None	Surendra Pal	Communist Party of India
Hamirpur	None	Onkar Nath	Janata Party
Maudaha	None	Laxmi Narain	Janata Party
Rath	None	Bal Krishna	Janata Party
Charkhari	SC	Mohan Lal	Indian National Congress
Mahoba	None	Udit Narain	Janata Party
Mehroni	None	Ranvir Singh	Janata Party
Lalitpur	None	Sudama Prasad Goswami	Janata Party
Jhansi	None	Surya Mukhi Sharma	Janata Party
Babina	SC	Bhagwat Dayal	Janata Party
Mauranipur	SC	Prem Narain	Janata Party
Garoutha	None	Ranjeet Singh Joo Deo	Indian National Congress
Konch	SC	Kaushal Kishore	Janata Party
Orai	None	Shyam Sundar	Janata Party
Kalpi	None	Shanker Singh	Janata Party
Madhogarh	None	Krishna Kumar	Janata Party
Bhongara	None	Hari Ram Shakya	Janata Party
Kishni	SC	Hakim Lal	Janata Party
Karhal	None	Nathu Singh	Janata Party
Shikohabad	None	Ganga Sahai Yadav	Janata Party
Jasrana	None	Balbir Singh	Janata Party
Ghiror	None	Virendra Pati Yadav	Janata Party
Mainpuri	None	Malikhan Singh	Janata Party
Aliganj	None	Genda Lal	Janata Party
Patiyali	None	Jasvir Singh	Janata Party
Sakit	None	Pyarey Lal	Janata Party
Soron	None	Ram Pratap	Janata Party
Kasganj	None	Net Ram Singh	Janata Party
Etah	None	Ganga Prasad	Janata Party
Nidhauli Kalan	None	Ram Singh	Janata Party
Jalesar	SC	Madhav	Janata Party
Firozabad	None	Raghubar Dayal Verma	Janata Party
Bah	None	Raja Mahendra Ripudaman Singh	Janata Party
Fatehabad	None	Hukam Singh Parihar	Janata Party
Tundla	SC	Rajesh Kumar Singh	Janata Party
Etmadpur	SC	Chandra Bhan Maurya	Janata Party
Dayalbagh	None	Shyam Dutt Paliwal	Janata Party
Agra Cantonment	None	Dr. Krishan Vir Singh Kaushal	Indian National Congress
Agra East	None	Surendra Kumar Kalra (sindhu)	Indian National Congress
Agra West	SC	Gulab Sehra	Indian National Congress
Kheragarh	None	Guru Dott Solanki	Janata Party
Fatehpur Sikri	None	Badan Singh	Janata Party
Goverdhan	SC	Gyanendra Swarup	Janata Party
Mathura	None	Kanhaiya Lal	Janata Party
Chhata	None	Lakhi Singh	Janata Party
Mat	None	Radhey Shyam	Janata Party
Gokul	None	Onkar Singh	Janata Party
Sadabad	None	H.c. Tiwari	Janata Party
Hathras	None	Ram Saran Singh	Janata Party
Sasni	SC	Bangali Singh	Janata Party
Sikandara Rao	None	Nem Singh Chauhan	Janata Party
Gangiri	None	Babu Singh	Janata Party
Atrauli	None	Kalyan Singh	Janata Party
Aligarh	None	Moziz Ali Beg	Janata Party
Koil	SC	Kishan Lal Diler	Janata Party
Iglas	None	Rajendra Singh	Janata Party
Barauli	None	Sangram Singh	Janata Party
Khair	None	Piarey Lal	Janata Party
Jewar	SC	Aidal Singh	Janata Party
Khurja	None	Banarsi Dass	Janata Party
Debai	None	Himmat Singh	Janata Party
Anupshahr	None	Beni Prasad	Janata Party
Siana	None	Arif Mohammad Khan	Janata Party
Agota	None	Gajendra Singh	Janata Party
Bulandshahr	None	Vijai Raj Singh	Janata Party
Shikarpur	SC	Trilok Chadra	Janata Party
Sikandrabad	None	Pratap Singh	Janata Party
Dadri	None	Tej Singh	Janata Party
Ghaziabad	None	Rajendra	Janata Party
Muradnagar	None	Anwar	Janata Party
Modinagar	None	Sohan Bir	Janata Party
Hapur	SC	Banarsi Das	Janata Party
Garhmukteshwar	None	Sakhawat Hussain	Janata Party
Kithore	None	Ram Dayal	Janata Party
Hastinapur	SC	Reoti Sharan Maurya	Janata Party
Sardhana	None	Balvir Singh	Janata Party
Meerut Cantonment	None	Ajit Singh	Indian National Congress
Meerut	None	Manzoor Ahmed	Indian National Congress
Kharkhauda	None	Abdul Halim Khan	Janata Party
Siwalkhas	SC	Hari Singh	Janata Party
Khekra	None	Chhajju Singh	Janata Party
Baghpat	None	Ismail	Janata Party
Barnawa	None	Dharam Vir Singh	Janata Party
Chhaprauli	None	Narendra Singh	Janata Party
Kandhla	None	Ajab Singh	Janata Party
Khatauli	None	Laxman Singh	Janata Party
Jansath	SC	Qabool Singh	Janata Party
Morna	None	Narayan Singh	Janata Party
Muzaffarnagar	None	Malti Sharma	Janata Party
Charthawal	SC	Nand Ram	Janata Party
Baghra	None	Babu Singh	Independent
Kairana	None	Bashir Ahmad	Janata Party
Thana Bhawan	None	Mool Chand	Janata Party
Nakur	None	Yash Pal Singh	Indian National Congress
Sarsawa	None	Ajab Singh	Janata Party
Nagal	SC	Ram Singh	Janata Party
Deoband	None	Mohammad Usman	Janata Party
Harora	SC	Bimla Rakesh	Janata Party
Saharanpur	None	Sumer Chand	Janata Party
Muzaffarabad	None	Haji Shamshad Ahmad	Janata Party
Roorkee	None	Rao Mushtaq	Janata Party
Lhaksar	None	Kazi Mohd. Mohiuddin	Janata Party
Hardwar	None	Raj Kumar Sharma	Janata Party
Mussoorie	None	Ranjeet Singh	Janata Party
Dehra Dun	None	Devendra Dutt Shastri	Janata Party
Chakrata	ST	Survir Singh	Janata Party

== Bypolls ==
Year	Constituency	Reason for by-poll	Winning candidate	Party
1978	Mankapur	Death of Ganga Prasad	C. C. Lal	Indian National Congress
1978	Soraon	Death of R. Pratap	M. P. Singh	Indian National Congress
1979	Gunnaur	Death of Sheoraj Singh	Premwati	Janata Party
1979	Rari	Death of Raj Bahadur Yadava	S. N. Upadhya	Indian National Congress
1979	Allahabad West	Death of Habib Ahmad	C. N. Singh	Indian National Congress
1980	Jaisingpur	Death of Maqbool Husain Khan	R. Lakhan	Indian National Congress
1980	Kauriram	Death of R. Singh	G. Devi	Janata Party
Source:ECI

== See also ==
- List of constituencies of the Uttar Pradesh Legislative Assembly
- 1977 elections in India
- Ram Naresh Yadav ministry
