= Abdul Waheed (politician) =

Indian politician

Member of Uttar Pradesh Legislative Assembly
- In office 1974–1980
- Constituency: Seohara Constituency

Personal details
- Party: Janata Party
- Occupation: Politician

Abdul Waheed is an Indian politician member of the 1974 Uttar Pradesh Legislative Assembly election and 1977 Uttar Pradesh Legislative Assembly election constituency Seohara Member of party Bharatiya Kranti Dal and Janata Dal

== Political career ==
Abdul Waheed has been associated with state-level politics in India and has served as a Member of the Legislative Assembly (MLA).
