= Naina Balsaver =

Indian actress

- Born: 1959 (age 66–67); Uttar Pradesh, India
- Occupations: Model, actress, jewelry designer
- Height: 1.66 m (5 ft 5 in)
- Beauty pageant titleholder
- Title: Femina Miss India Universe 1976; Femina Miss India World 1976
- Hair color: Black
- Eye color: Black
- Major competitions: Femina Miss India 1976 (Winner); Miss Universe 1976 (Unplaced)

Naina Balsaver Ahmed (born 1959) is an Indian actress, model and beauty pageant titleholder who the winner of Femina Miss India 1976.

== Early life and pageantry ==
Naina Balsaver was born in Uttar Pradesh. In the year 1976 she competed in Femina Miss India pageant and eventually won the coveted crown. She was appointed to represent India at Miss Universe 1976 and Miss World 1976 pageants. However she did not compete in Miss World 1976 due to protest against the presence of two South African entries - one white and one black - in conformity with the apartheid policy of racial separation. The same year, she competed at Miss Universe pageant but remained unplaced.

She is the only Femina Miss India winner who carried both the Femina Miss India Universe and Femina Miss India World titles.

== Career ==
She acted in Bollywood films. She acted in the television soap opera, Manzil. She contested on BSP ticket against N. D. Tiwari but lost the election.

She is a jewelry designer.

== Personal life ==
She married twice, first when she was 19. She later married Akbar Ahmed, a politician and real estate developer. Her first husband's name was Riyaz Ismail. Her mother was an Indian classical singer called Bela Saaver and her aunt is the disco and Jazz vocalist Asha Puthli.
