= Mehnagar Assembly constituency =

Constituency of the Uttar Pradesh legislative assembly in India

Coordinates: 25.88°N 83.11°E

Mehnagar
- Constituency No. 352 for the Uttar Pradesh Legislative Assembly

Constituency details
- Country: India
- Region: North India
- State: Uttar Pradesh
- District: Azamgarh
- Total electors: 4,04,280
- Reservation: SC

Member of Legislative Assembly
- 18th Uttar Pradesh Legislative Assembly
- Incumbent Puja Saroj
- Party: Samajwadi Party
- Elected year: 2022

Mehnagar is a constituency of the Uttar Pradesh Legislative Assembly covering the city of Mehnagar in the Azamgarh district of Uttar Pradesh, India.

Mehnagar is one of five assembly constituencies in the Azamgarh Lok Sabha constituency. Since 2008, this assembly constituency is numbered 352 amongst 403 constituencies.

== Election results ==
=== 2027 ===
2027 Uttar Pradesh Legislative Assembly election: Mehnagar
Party	Candidate	Votes	%	±%
INDIA				
NDA				
BSP				
NOTA	None of the above			
Majority				
Turnout				
gain from		Swing		

=== 2022 ===
2022 Uttar Pradesh Legislative Assembly election: Mehnagar
Party	Candidate	Votes	%	±%
SP	Puja Saroj	86,960	39.35	+5.2
BJP	Manju Saroj	72,811	32.94	
BSP	Pankaj Kumar	50,173	22.7	−7.08
AIMIM	Karmveer Azad	4,377	1.98	
NOTA	None of the above	1,649	0.75	−0.5
Majority		14,149	6.41	+3.74
Turnout		221,016	54.67	+2.43
SP hold		Swing		

=== 2017 ===
Samajwadi Party candidate Kalpnath Paswan won in last Assembly election of 2017 Uttar Pradesh Legislative Elections defeating Suheldev Bharatiya Samaj Party candidate Manjoo Saroj by a margin of 5,412 votes.

2017 Uttar Pradesh Legislative Assembly Election: Mehnaga
Party	Candidate	Votes	%	±%
SP	Kalpnath Paswan	69,037	34.15	
SBSP	Manjoo Saroj	63,625	31.48	
BSP	Vidhya Chaudhari	60,198	29.78	
NOTA	None of the above	2,492	1.25	
Majority		5,412	2.67	
Turnout		202,135	52.24	

== Members of the Legislative Assembly ==
#	Term	Member of Legislative Assembly	Party	From	To	Days	Comment
01	04th Vidhan Sabha	Jainu	Bharatiya Jana Sangh	March 1967	April 1968	402	
02	05th Vidhan Sabha	Chhangur	Communist Party of India (Marxist)	February 1969	March 1974	1,832	
03	06th Vidhan Sabha	Jang Bahadur	Bharatiya Kranti Dal	March 1974	April 1977	1,153	
04	07th Vidhan Sabha	Bhuddhoo	Janata Party	June 1977	February 1980	969	
05	08th Vidhan Sabha	Deep Narayan	Indian National Congress (Indira)	June 1980	March 1985	1,735	
06	09th Vidhan Sabha	Deep Narayan	Indian National Congress	March 1985	November 1989	1,725	
07	10th Vidhan Sabha	Deep Narayan	Indian National Congress	December 1989	April 1991	488	
08	11th Vidhan Sabha	Kalpnath Paswan	Bharatiya Janata Party	June 1991	December 1992	533	
09	12th Vidhan Sabha	Daroga Prasad	Samajwadi Party	December 1993	October 1995	693	
10	13th Vidhan Sabha	Ram Jag	Communist Party of India (Marxist)	October 1996	March 2002	1,967	
11	14th Vidhan Sabha	Vidya Chaudhary	Bahujan Samaj Party	February 2002	May 2007	1,902	
12	15th Vidhan Sabha	Vidya Chaudhary	Bahujan Samaj Party	May 2007	March 2012	1,736	
13	16th Vidhan Sabha	Brij Lal Sonkar	Samajwadi Party	March 2012	March 2017	1,829	
14	17th Vidhan Sabha	Kalpnath Paswan	Samajwadi Party	March 2017	March 2022	3476	
