= Arun Kumar Yadav (Uttar Pradesh politician) =

Indian politician

MLA, 17th Legislative Assembly
- In office 2007–2012
- Preceded by: Shyam Bahadur Yadav
- Succeeded by: Ramakant Yadav
- Constituency: Phoolpur Pawai, Azamgarh

Personal details
- Born: 14 November 1980 (age 45) Azamgarh, Uttar Pradesh
- Party: Bharatiya Janata Party
- Children: 4
- Parent: Ramakant Yadav (former MP) (father)
- Education: Graduate
- Occupation: MLA
- Profession: Politician

Arun Kumar Yadav is an Indian politician and a member of 17th Legislative Assembly, Uttar Pradesh of India. He represents the Phoolpur Pawai constituency in Azamgarh district of Uttar Pradesh and is the only BJP legislator from the region.

== Political career ==
Arun Kumar Yadav is an Indian politician and a member of 17th Legislative Assembly, Uttar Pradesh of India. He represents the ‘Phoolpur Pawai’ constituency in Azamgarh district of Uttar Pradesh.

== Positions held ==
#		From	To	Position	Comments
01	2007 To 2012	March 2017 To 2022	Incumbent	Member,Legislative Assembly	

== See also ==
- Uttar Pradesh Legislative Assembly
