= Algu Rai Shastri =

Indian politician

Member of Parliament, Lok Sabha
- In office 1952-1957
- Succeeded by: Kalika Singh
- Constituency: Azamgarh, Uttar Pradesh

Personal details
- Born: Algu Rai; 29 January 1900 Amila, North West Provinces, British India, (present-day Uttar Pradesh, India)
- Died: 12 February 1967 Azamgarh, Uttar Pradesh
- Party: Indian National Congress
- Spouse: Parmeshwari Devi
- Parent(s): Dwarka Rai (father) and Kamal Devi (mother)
- Cabinet: Jawaharlal Nehru and Lal Bahadur Shashtri

Algu Rai Shastri (1900-1967) was an Indian Freedom fighter and a politician. He was elected to the Lok Sabha, the lower house of the Parliament of India as a member of the Indian National Congress. He took part in the Non-Cooperation Movement and Quit India Movement. On contrary with Gandhian values of Satyagraha he did not believe in non-violent resistance. He was a staunch Arya Samaji and Socialist who was against the imposition of English language.

Born on 29 January 1900 in Amila village of Ghosi tehsil in current day Mau district in a Bhumihar family, Algu Rai received his school education in Varanasi (then Banaras). Later on he graduated from Kashi Vidyapith University. He perused politics and worked for public welfare from an early age. He served as secretary of the Meerut District Congress Committee from (1928-1930), and as secretary of the Delhi Provincial Congress Committee from (1930-1933). He was elected as a MLA of the United Provinces from (1937-1952) and became the president of the Uttar Pradesh Congress Committee in 1951. He had been a member of the All India Congress Committee from 1928 up until his death in 1967 and was a member of Indian Council of Agricultural Research.

In his speech he supported and advised the Indian annexation of Goa from the Portuguese Colonial rule and supported the inclusion of Nepal, Bhutan, the former Kingdom of Sikkim in the Dominion of India.

“The territories of Pondicherry, Goa, Daman and Diu, at present under foreign domination, also form parts of India. I wish these all together with Nepal, Bhutan and Sikkim, which constitute our frontier, should also be included in this free land.”

Algu Rai Shastri was actively involved in the Amila Kand during the Quit India Movement. Earlier in 1942, British authorities had burnt his house, which triggered widespread unrest in the region. On 15 August 1942, in Amila, hundreds of revolutionaries under the leadership of Radhe Rai, Ramchandra Rai, Baldev Rai, and Pateshwari Rai engaged in armed resistance against colonial rule. Following the uprising, Pateshwari Rai was imprisoned for two years and was subjected to 15 lashes, while Ramshankar Rai was sentenced to six months of imprisonment.
