= Ravindra Kishore Shahi =

Indian politician

Babu Shri Ravindra Kishore Shahi was a leader of Bharatiya Jan Sangh from Uttar Pradesh. He was leader of the Uttar Pradesh state unit of party from 1974 to 1977. He was a member of the Uttar Pradesh Legislative Assembly from Deoria district. He served as cabinet minister in Ram Naresh Yadav ministry from 1977 to 80. Babu Shri Ravindra Kishore Shahi has three sons namely Babu Shri Murari Mohan Shahi, Babu Shri Tripurari Sharan Shahi and Babu Shri Om Prakash Shahi. His grandsons namely Babu Shri Abhijeet Shahi and Babu Shri Vishwajeet Shahi work in MNCs and granddaughters namely Ayushi Shahi is a Company Secretary in employment and Anjali Shahi is a practicing Advocate at Bombay High Court.
