= Akhilesh Yadav (born 1964) =

Indian politician

Member of the Uttar Pradesh Legislative Assembly
- Incumbent
- Assumed office 2022
- Preceded by: Shah Alam alias Guddu Jamali
- Constituency: Mubarakpur

Personal details
- Born: 1964 (age 61–62) Mubarakpur Azamgarh district, Uttar Pradesh
- Education: Intermediate (Town Inter College, Mohammadabad Gohna)

Akhilesh Yadav (born 1964) is an Indian politician from Uttar Pradesh. He is a member of the Uttar Pradesh Legislative Assembly from Mubarakpur Assembly constituency in Azamgarh district. He won the 2022 Uttar Pradesh Legislative Assembly election representing the Samajwadi Party, which won all the 10 seats in the district.

== Early life and education ==
Yadav is from Mubarakpur, Azamgarh district, Uttar Pradesh. He is the son of Ramakant. He passed intermediate (Class 12) in 1980 at Town Inter College, Mohammadabad Gohna, Mau district.

== Career ==
Yadav won from Mubarakpur Assembly constituency representing Samajwadi Party in the 2022 Uttar Pradesh Legislative Assembly election. He polled 80,726 votes and defeated his nearest rival, Arvind Jaiswal of the Bharatiya Janata Party, by a margin of 29,103 votes. Earlier, he lost the Mubarakpur seat twice. He lost the 2017 Uttar Pradesh Legislative Assembly election to Bahujan Samaj Party candidate Shah Alam Urf Guddu Jamali.
