= Rashtriya Sanjay Manch =

Political party in India, 1983–1988

- Abbreviation: RSM
- Leader: Maneka Gandhi
- Founder: Maneka Gandhi
- Founded: 3 April 1983
- Dissolved: 1988
- Merged into: Janata Dal
- Youth wing: Sanjay Vichar Manch (SVM)
- Membership (1983): 800,000
- Ideology: Youth empowerment Employment

Party flag
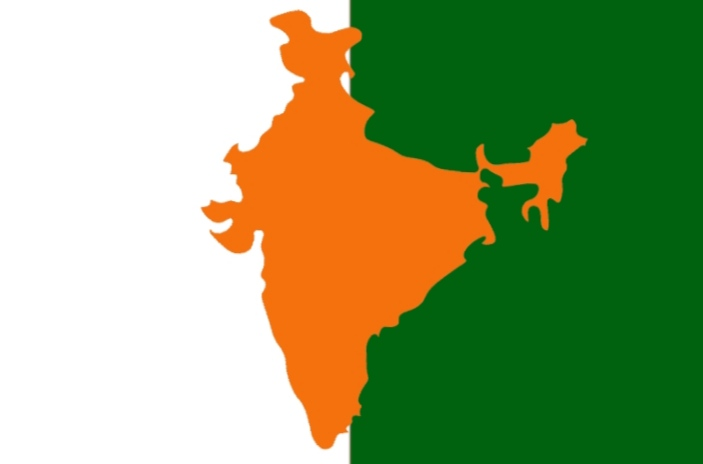

Rashtriya Sanjay Manch (RSM) was a political party founded by Maneka Gandhi, the widow of Indian politician Sanjay Gandhi and estranged daughter-in-law of then Prime Minister of India, Indira Gandhi, on 3 April 1983. The party was established along with Akbar Ahmad Dumpy, with a focus on youth empowerment and employment. RSM was launched with a grand inaugural convention at Feroze Shah Kotla grounds in New Delhi, which was attended by around 5,000 delegates from across the country. In 1988, the Rashtriya Sanjay Manch was merged with the Janata Dal, which was the main opposition party at that time.

== History ==
Maneka Gandhi had previously been associated with the Congress(I) party. However, after a fallout with her mother-in-law and PM Indira Gandhi, she was forced to leave the prime minister's residence at 1, Safdarjung Road. After that, Maneka Gandhi established Rashtriya Sanjay Manch, which aimed to provide a platform for her political aspirations and address the youth's concerns. The party was based on the ideology of Sanjay Gandhi.

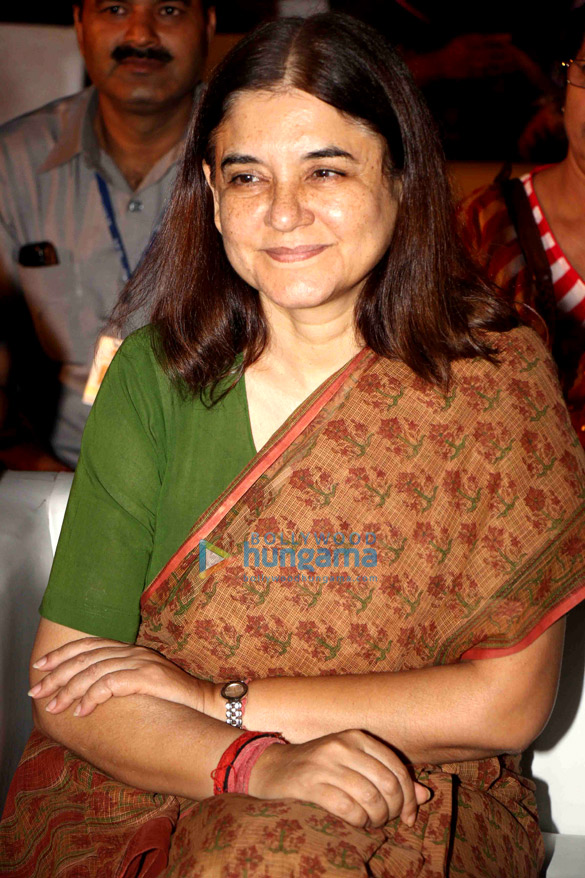
Maneka Gandhi was the founder of the Rashtriya Sanjay Manch, which she named after her husband, Sanjay Gandhi.

Before the party's launch, Maneka had already established an organization known as the Sanjay Vichar Manch (SVM), which later transformed into the youth wing of the Rashtriya Sanjay Manch.

Maneka Gandhi was the face of the party and had a significant following. She claimed that the party had 800,000 members. Her political career took a turn when she contested the 1984 general election against Rajiv Gandhi for the Amethi Lok Sabha constituency but lost.

As of April 1983, the party had two Members of Parliament, including former deputy finance minister Maganbhai Barot, along with two Members of the Legislative Assembly (MLAs) from Uttar Pradesh, one MLA from Bihar, and four MLAs from Andhra Pradesh.

In the 1984 Malihabad assembly by-election, Brij Lal, a gram pradhan from Amethi and candidate of RSM, won against Shanti Kureel of the Congress(I) by over 7,400 votes. This victory made other political parties acknowledge growing influence of Rashtriya Sanjay Manch.

In 1987, the RSM candidate Akbar Ahmad Dumpy, with support from the Janata Party and the Lok Dal won the assembly election in the Kashipur against the Congress(I) candidate and the state's Minister for Parliamentary Affairs, Ammar Rizvi.

=== 1983 Assembly elections in Andhra Pradesh ===
In the 1983 assembly election, the party formed an alliance with the Telugu Desam Party and secured victory in four out of the five seats it contested. Meanwhile, the Telugu Desam Party, its ally, won 199 seats. It was the first time in Andhra Pradesh's history that a non-Congress party was voted to power.

== Controversies and criticism of Indira Gandhi ==
In September 1982, three individuals closely associated with Maneka, including Vice President of Rashtriya Sanjay Manch, Akbar Ahmad Dumpy, were arrested on charges related to the death of a servant. The court promptly dismissed the case. The media frenzy over the incident fueled public suspicion of PM Indira Gandhi suppressing Maneka's group. It also heightened criticism of Indira's leadership, with accusations of authoritarianism and cronyism.

Later, Dumpy, who was a co-accused in the case of the killing of the servant, was acquitted by a special court in November 2022.

== See also ==
- List of political parties in India
