= Puja Saroj =

Member of the Uttar Pradesh Legislative Assembly

Member of Uttar Pradesh Legislative Assembly
- Incumbent
- Assumed office March 2022
- Preceded by: Kalpnath Paswan
- Constituency: Mehnagar

Personal details
- Born: 2 November 1990 (age 35) Varanasi, Uttar Pradesh
- Party: Samajwadi Party
- Spouse: Rajiv Kumar
- Children: 1
- Education: Master of Arts
- Alma mater: Banaras Hindu University
- Profession: Politician

Puja Saroj is an Indian politician and a member of the 18th Uttar Pradesh Assembly from the Mehnagar Assembly constituency of Azamgarh. She is a member of the Samajwadi Party.

== Early life ==
Puja Saroj was born on 2 November 1990 in Varanasi, Uttar Pradesh, to a Hindu family of Ghanshyam. She married Rajiv Kumar on 8 February 2015, and they have one child.

== Education ==
Puja Saroj completed her post-graduation with a Master of Arts at Banaras Hindu University, Varanasi, in 2014.

== Posts held ==
#	From	To	Position	Comments
01	2022	Incumbent	Member, 18th Uttar Pradesh Assembly	

== See also ==
- 18th Uttar Pradesh Assembly
- Lalganj Assembly constituency
- Uttar Pradesh Legislative Assembly
