= Phoolpur Pawai Assembly constituency =

Constituency of the Uttar Pradesh legislative assembly in India

Coordinates: 26.18°N 82.73°E

Phoolpur Pawai
- Constituency No. 349 for the Uttar Pradesh Legislative Assembly

Constituency details
- Country: India
- Region: North India
- State: Uttar Pradesh
- District: Azamgarh
- Total electors: 3,28,807
- Reservation: None

Member of Legislative Assembly
- 18th Uttar Pradesh Legislative Assembly
- Incumbent Ramakant Yadav
- Party: Samajwadi Party
- Elected year: 2022

Phoolpur Pawai is a constituency of the Uttar Pradesh Legislative Assembly covering the city of Phoolpur Pawai in the Azamgarh district of Uttar Pradesh, India.

Phoolpur Pawai is one of five assembly constituencies in the Lalganj Lok Sabha constituency. Since 2008, this assembly constituency is numbered 349 amongst 403 constituencies.

== Election results ==
=== 2027 ===
2027 Uttar Pradesh Legislative Assembly election: Phoolpur Pawai
Party	Candidate	Votes	%	±%
INDIA				
NDA				
BSP				
NOTA	None of the above			
Majority				
Turnout				
gain from		Swing		

=== 2022 ===
2022 Uttar Pradesh Legislative Assembly election: Phoolpur Pawai
Party	Candidate	Votes	%	±%
SP	Ramakant Yadav	81,164	42.0	+20.65
BJP	Ramsurat Rajbhar	55,858	28.91	−9.44
BSP	Shakeel Ahmed	49,495	25.61	−8.65
NOTA	None of the above	1,058	0.55	−0.36
Majority		25,306	13.09	+9.0
Turnout		193,244	58.77	+0.25
SP gain from BJP		Swing		

=== 2017 ===
Bharatiya Janta Party candidate Arun Kumar Yadav won in last Assembly election of 2017 Uttar Pradesh Legislative Elections defeating Bahujan Samaj Party candidate Abul Qais Azmi by a margin of 7,295 votes.

2017 Uttar Pradesh Legislative Assembly Election: Phoolpur Pawa
Party	Candidate	Votes	%	±%
BJP	Arun Kumar Yadav	68,435	38.35	
BSP	Abul Qais Azmi	61,140	34.26	
SP	Shyam Bahadur Singh Yadav	38,099	21.35	
NISHAD	Ramsurat	4,012	2.25	
NOTA	None of the above	1,609	0.91	
Majority		7,295	4.09	
Turnout		178,455	58.52	

== Members of Legislative Assembly ==
Year	Member	Political Party
1951	Shiva Nath Katju	Indian National Congress
1957	Shiv Murti	Indian National Congress
1957	Sukhi Ram Bhartiya	Indian National Congress
1962	Muzaffar Hasan	Indian National Congress
1967	Ram Bachan	Indian National Congress
1969	Ram Bachan	Bharatiya Kranti Dal
1974	Ram Bachan	Bharatiya Kranti Dal
1977	Padmakar	Janata Party
1980	Abul Kalam	Indian National Congress (Indira)
1985	Ramakant Yadav	Indian National Congress (Jagjivan)
1989	Ramakant Yadav	Bahujan Samaj Party
1991	Ramakant Yadav	Janata Party
1993	Ramakant Yadav	Samajwadi Party
1996	Ram Naresh Yadav	Indian National Congress
2002	Ram Naresh Yadav	Indian National Congress
2007	Arun Kumar Yadav	Samajwadi Party
2012	Shyam Bahadur Yadav	Samajwadi Party
2017	Arun Kumar Yadav	Bharatiya Janata Party
2022	Ramakant Yadav	Samajwadi Party
