= Chandrajit Yadav =

Indian politician

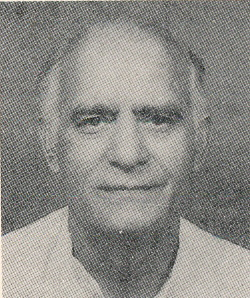

Member of Parliament, Lok Sabha
- In office 1991-1996
- Preceded by: Ram Krishna Yadav
- Succeeded by: Ramakant Yadav
- In office 1980-1984
- Preceded by: Mohsina Kidwai
- Succeeded by: Santosh Singh
- In office 1967-1977
- Preceded by: Ram Harakh Yadav
- Succeeded by: Ram Naresh Yadav
- Constituency: Azamgarh, Uttar Pradesh

Personal details
- Born: 1 January 1930 Sarupaha, Azamgarh, United Provinces, British India
- Died: 25 May 2007 (aged 77)
- Party: Janata Dal
- Other political affiliations: Indian National Congress, Janata Party
- Spouse: Asha Yadav

Chandrajit Yadav was an Indian politician. He was elected to the Lok Sabha, the lower house of the Parliament of India from Azamgarh constituency in 1967, 1971 as member of the Indian National Congress, and lost to Ram Naresh Yadav of Janata Party in 1977. When Indira Gandhi split the party, he remained with the 'Socialist' group, and came third in Azamgarh bypoll of 1978 won by Mohsina Kidwai of Indira Congress. He then left Congress and won from Azamgarh in 1980 as Janata Party (Secular) candidate. Then he was back in Congress and lost in Phulpur in 1989 Lok Sabha elections. He won from Azamgarh in 1991 Lok Sabha elections as a Janata Dal candidate.

He was the Union Minister of Steel and Mines in the Indira Gandhi Ministry.
