= Sarvesh Singh Seepu =

Indian politician

Sarvesh Singh Seepu (died 19 July 2013 in Azamgarh) was an Indian politician, his father Ram Pyare Singh served as a minister in the government of Mulayam Singh Yadav. He was Uttar Pradesh MLA for Azamgarh (2007–2012). He was a member of the Samajwadi Party and later the Bahujan Samaj Party, of which he became a leading figure.

== Death ==
Sarvesh Singh was shot on 19 July 2013 at the age of 35. He died alongside his guard. Protesting supporters of Sarvesh Singh attacked police posts and set fire to several vehicles. The supporters blamed the police for the death of Sarvesh Singh. Clashes between the police and supporters of Sarvesh Singh led to one death and several wounded. Sarvesh Singh was also very close to the leader Amer Singh
