= Nafees Ahmad =

Indian politician (born 1980)

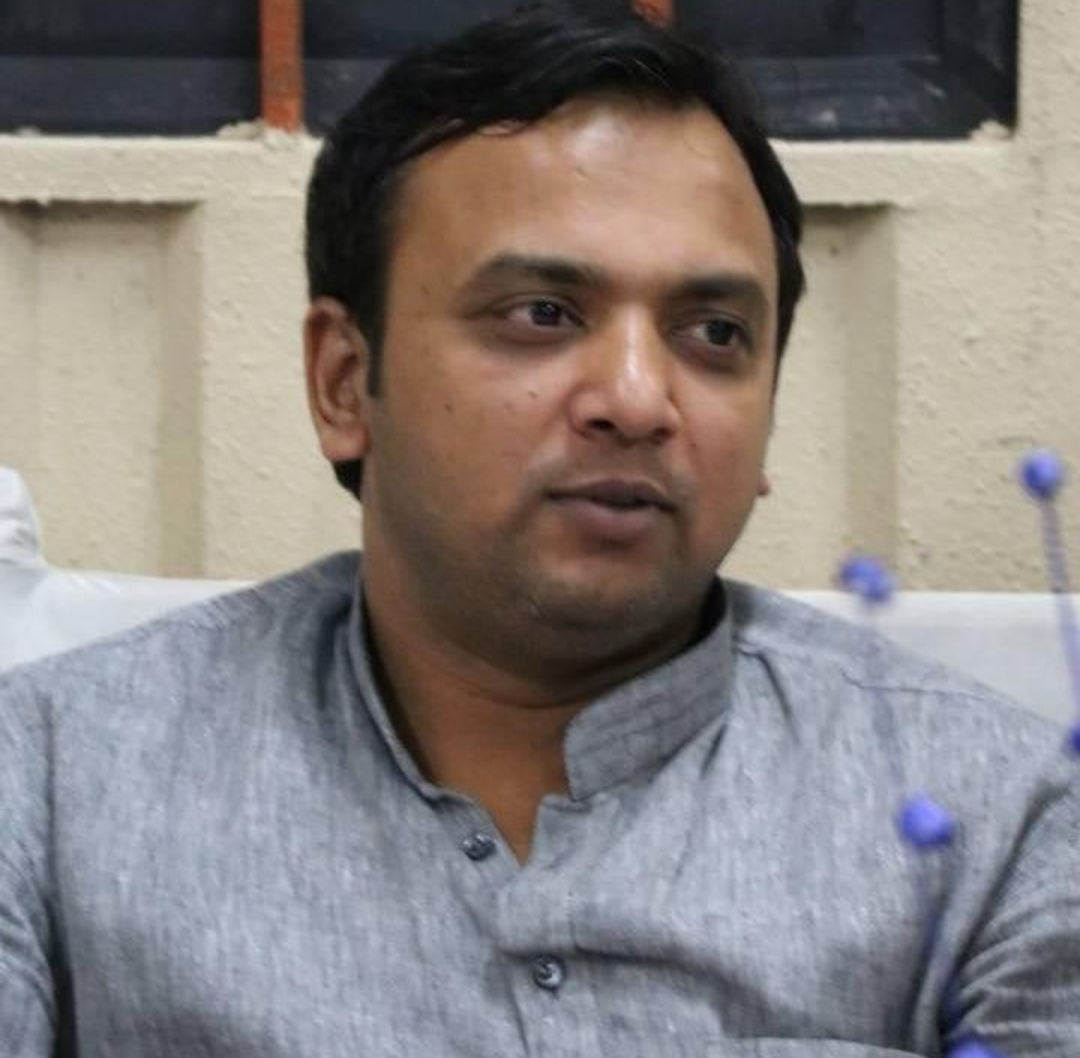

Member of the Legislative Assembly of Gopalpur
- Incumbent
- Assumed office March 2017
- Constituency: Gopalpur, Azamgarh

Personal details
- Born: 8 July 1980 (age 46) Azamgarh, Uttar Pradesh, India
- Party: Samajwadi Party
- Spouse: Nishad Akhtar (m. 2004)
- Relations: Saim Khan (Nephew)
- Children: 1 son, 4 daughters
- Education: Aligarh Muslim University (B.A.); Chhatrapati Shahu Ji Maharaj University (M.A.)
- Occupation: MLA
- Profession: Politician, Agriculture

Nafees Ahmad is an Indian politician and a member of 17th Uttar Pradesh Assembly who belongs to Azamgarh, Uttar Pradesh. He represents the Gopalpur constituency of Uttar Pradesh and is a member of the Samajwadi Party.

== Early life and education ==
Ahmad was born 8 July 1980 in Sadar, Azamgarh, Uttar Pradesh to Altaf Ahmad. He married Nishad Akhtar in 2004, they have one son and three daughters. He belongs to Muslim family. He did his B.A. degree from Aligarh Muslim University and had M.A. degree from Chhatrapati Shahu Ji Maharaj University, Kanpur.

== Political career ==
Ahmad was President of Aligarh Muslim University Students' Union. Ahmad is representing as MLA of Gopalpur since 2017, as a member of Samajwadi Party. In 17th Legislative Assembly of Uttar Pradesh (2017) elections he defeated Bharatiya Janata Party candidate Shrikrishna Pal by a margin of 14,960 votes.

== Posts held ==
#	From	To	Position	Comments
01	March 2017	Incumbent	Member, 17th Legislative Assembly of Uttar Pradesh	
