= Ram Krishna Yadav (Indian politician) =

Indian politician

Member of Parliament, Lok Sabha
- In office 1989-1991
- Preceded by: Santosh Singh
- Succeeded by: Chandrajit Yadav
- Constituency: Azamgarh

Personal details
- Born: 27 January 1937 (age 89) Azamgarh, United Provinces, British India
- Party: Bahujan Samaj Party
- Spouse: Bimla Yadav
- Children: 2 sons and a daughter
- Education: Banaras Hindu University

Ram Krishna Yadav is an Indian politician. He was elected to the Lok Sabha, the lower house of the Parliament of India from Azamgarh constituency in 1989 as member of the Bahujan Samaj Party.He was a student of the Banaras Hindu University and is a lawyer.
