= Kalika Singh =

Indian politician

Member of Parliament, Lok Sabha
- In office 1957-1962
- Preceded by: Algu Rai Shastri
- Succeeded by: Ram Harakh Yadav
- Constituency: Azamgarh, Uttar Pradesh

Personal details
- Born: 17 July 1911 Lahuan, Azamgarh district, United Provinces, British India, (present-day Uttar Pradesh, India)
- Party: Indian National Congress
- Spouse: Kusumkumari

Kalika Singh (born 17 July 1911, date of death unknown) was an Indian politician. He was elected to the Lok Sabha, lower house of the Parliament of India from Azamgarh, Uttar Pradesh as a member of the Indian National Congress.
