= Kalpnath Paswan =

Indian politician

Member of Legislative Assembly for Mehnagar
- Incumbent
- Assumed office March 2017
- Preceded by: Brij Lal Sonkar
- In office June 1991 – December 1992
- Preceded by: Deep Narayan
- Succeeded by: Daroga Prasad
- Constituency: Mehnagar, Azamgarh

Personal details
- Born: 10 October 1946 (age 79) Ganjor, Azamgarh, Uttar Pradesh
- Party: Bhartiya Janta Party
- Parent: Late Ribei
- Education: Intermediate
- Occupation: MLA
- Profession: Politician, farmer

Kalpnath Paswan is an Indian politician and a member of 11th and 17th Legislative Assembly of Uttar Pradesh of India. He represents the Mehnagar constituency in Azamgarh district of Uttar Pradesh and is a member of the Bhartiya Janta Party.

== Political career ==
Paswan is a member of the 17th Legislative Assembly of Uttar Pradesh. He is a current member of the BJP and in 1991 he represented the Mehnagar constituency. In 2017 Uttar Pradesh Legislative Elections he defeated Suheldev Bharatiya Samaj Party candidate Manjoo Saroj by a margin of 5,412 votes.

== Posts held ==
#	From	To	Position	Comments
01	June 1991	December 1992	Member, 11th Legislative Assembly	
02	March 2017	March 2022	Member, 17th Legislative Assembly	

== See also ==
- Uttar Pradesh Legislative Assembly
