= Durga Prasad Yadav =

Indian politician

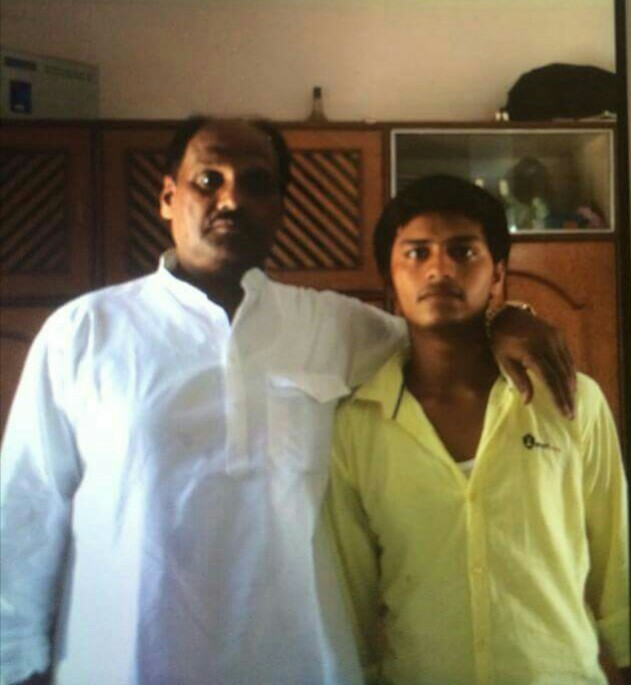

Member of Uttar Pradesh Legislative Assembly
- Incumbent
- Assumed office October 1996
- Preceded by: Raj Bali Yadav
- Constituency: Azamgarh
- In office March 1985 – December 1993
- Preceded by: Ram Kunwar Singh
- Succeeded by: Raj Bali Yadav
- Constituency: Azamgarh

Cabinet Minister (Government of Uttar Pradesh)
- In office 2012–2017
- Governor: Banwari Lal Joshi; Ram Naik
- Chief Minister: Akhilesh Yadav
- Ministry & Department's: Transport; Forest; Environment; Zoological Garden

Personal details
- Born: 12 January 1954 (age 72) Azamgarh, Uttar Pradesh, India
- Party: Samajwadi Party
- Other political affiliations: Janata Dal; Independent
- Education: Shibli National College, Azamgarh (B.A., Gorakhpur University); Shibli National College, Azamgarh (L.L.B., Veer Bahadur Singh Purvanchal University)
- Occupation: Agriculture
- Profession: Politician

Durga Prasad Yadav (born 12 January 1954) is an Indian politician serving as a member of the Legislative Assembly of Uttar Pradesh. He is also a former transport minister and forest minister. He represents the Azamgarh constituency of Uttar Pradesh and is a member of the Samajwadi Party.

== Personal life ==
Yadav was born 12 January 1954 in Aahopatti, Azamgarh district, Uttar Pradesh to his father Ram Dhyan Yadav. He graduated with a Bachelor of Arts degree from Shibli National College, Azamgarh under Gorakhpur University in 1981 and attained a Bachelor of Law degree from Shibli National College, Azamgarh under Veer Bahadur Singh Purvanchal University in 1991.

== Political career ==
Durga Prasad Yadav has been a MLA since 1985. He represented the Azamgarh constituency and is a member of the Samajwadi Party.

== Posts held ==
#	From	To	Position	Comments
01	1985	1989	Member, 09th Legislative Assembly	
02	1989	1991	Member, 10th Legislative Assembly	
03	1991	1993	Member, 11th Legislative Assembly	
04	1996	2002	Member, 13th Legislative Assembly	
05	2002	2007	Member, 14th Legislative Assembly	
06	2007	2012	Member, 15th Legislative Assembly	
07	2012	2017	Member, 16th Legislative Assembly	
08	2017	2022	Member, 17th Legislative Assembly	
09	2022	Incumbent	Member, 18th Legislative Assembly	

== See also ==
- Azamgarh
- Politics of India
- Sixteenth Legislative Assembly of Uttar Pradesh
- Uttar Pradesh Legislative Assembly
