= Shah Alam (Indian politician) =

Indian politician

Member of Uttar Pradesh Legislative Council
- Incumbent
- Assumed office May 6, 2024
- Constituency: elected by Legislative assembly members

Member of Uttar Pradesh Legislative Assembly
- In office March 8, 2012 – March 12, 2022
- Preceded by: Chandradev Ram Yadav
- Succeeded by: Akhilesh Yadav
- Constituency: Mubarakpur

Personal details
- Born: 1 June 1973 (age 52) Azamgarh, Uttar Pradesh, India
- Citizenship: Indian
- Party: Samajwadi Party (2024–present)
- Other political affiliations: Bahujan Samaj Party (2010–2021, 2022–2024); AIMIM (2021–2022)
- Occupation: Business
- Profession: Politician

Shah Alam (known as Guddu Jamali) is an Indian politician and a member of the 16th and 17th Legislative Assembly of Uttar Pradesh of India. He represented the Mubarakpur constituency of Uttar Pradesh and is a member of the Samajwadi Party and he was a close associate of BSP Supremo Mayawati.

== Early life and education ==
Alam was born in Azamgarh, Uttar Pradesh. He holds a Master of Arts degree.

== Political career ==
Alam has been a MLA. He represented the Mubarakpur constituency and was a member of the Bahujan Samaj Party. He left BSP to join Samajwadi Party before the 2022 Uttar Pradesh Legislative Assembly election but when he wasn't made the candidate from Mubarakpur he joined All India Majlis-e-Ittehadul Muslimeen and got a ticket from Mubarakpur. Jamali left AIMIM on 27 March 2022 and rejoined Bahujan Samaj Party most probably for being the party's candidate for the Azamgarh (Lok Sabha constituency) by-polls due to Akhilesh Yadav vacating the seat to become the leader of the opposition in the Uttar Pradesh Legislative Assembly. He Joined Samajwadi Party in 2024 and became a MLC. He played a crucial role in 2024 Lok Sabha elections by joining Samajwadi Party and helping the party to win Azamgarh Lok Sabha constituency. He was also considered as one of richest MLAs during 2012-17 era. He holds a strong position between people in Mubarakpur Assembly Constituency.

== Positions held ==
#	From	To	Position	Constituency	Comments
01	March 2012	March 2017	Member, 16th Legislative Assembly of Uttar Pradesh	Mubarakpur	
02	March 2017	March 2022	Member, 17th Legislative Assembly of Uttar Pradesh	Mubarakpur	
03	May 2024		Member, Uttar Pradesh Legislative Council	elected by MLA's	

== See also ==
- Azamgarh
- Politics of India
- Sixteenth Legislative Assembly of Uttar Pradesh
- Uttar Pradesh Legislative Assembly
