= Gore Lal Shakya =

Former Assembly member in Uttar Pradesh

Member of Uttar Pradesh Legislative Assembly
- In office 1974–1977
- Constituency: Bharthana Assembly constituency

Personal details
- Born: 1939 Etawah district, Uttar Pradesh
- Party: Indian National Congress (Organisation)

Gore Lal Shakya was an Indian politician and a former member of Uttar Pradesh Legislative Assembly, who was elected to Uttar Pradesh Legislative Assembly in 1974 Uttar Pradesh Legislative Assembly elections from Bharthana Assembly constituency of Etawah district of Uttar Pradesh. Shakya was a leader of Indian National Congress (Organisation).

== Life ==
Gore Lal Shakya was born to B.L Shakya (Budh Lal Shakya) in January 1939 in Etawah district of Indian state of Uttar Pradesh. He was a holder of bachelor's degree in Commerce and Law. Most of his education was completed in Etawah and Kanpur and he was married in 1963 to Manorama Shakya. They had two sons and two daughters from the marriage. Shakya was an agriculturist and lawyer before entering politics. He became an Assembly member in Uttar Pradesh for the first time in general elections of 1974 on the ticket of INC (O). He secured 27,297 votes in this election.
