= Bhulai Bhai =

Indian politician (died 2024)

Narayan alias Bhulai Bhai

Member of the Uttar Pradesh Legislative Assembly
- In office 1974–1980
- Constituency: Nebua-Naurangiya

Personal details
- Born: Pagar Chhapra, Kaptanganj, Kushinagar district, Uttar Pradesh
- Died: 31 October 2024 Pagar Chhapra, Kaptanganj, Kushinagar district Uttar Pradesh
- Party: Bharatiya Janata Party
- Other political affiliations: Bharatiya Jana Sangh
- Awards: Padma Shri

Narayan (died 31 October 2024) popularly known as Bhulai Bhai was an Indian politician who served as the Member of Uttar Pradesh Legislative Assembly from Nebua-Naurangiya Assembly constituency for two-terms, in 1974 and 1977. He was a member of Bharatiya Jana Sangh and Bharatiya Janata Party. He posthumously received the Padma Shri in 2025 under the Public Affairs category.

== Early life ==
Bhulai Bhai was born as Narayan at Pagar Chhapra, Kaptanganj in Kushinagar district of Uttar Pradesh.

== Career ==
He joined politics in 1967 after being influenced by the works of Deen Dayal Upadhyay for Hindutva. He left his job as a education officer to join Bharatiya Jana Sangh. He was elected first time to the Uttar Pradesh Legislative Assembly from Nebua-Naurangiya Assembly constituency in 1974 Uttar Pradesh Legislative Assembly election on the symbol of Bharatiya Jana Sangh and again won the same constituency with same symbol in 1977 and held the office till 1980. During emergency, he went to jail for some time.

== Death ==
He died after a prolonged illness on 31 October 2024 at his residence in Kushinagar. His death was condoled by Narendra Modi, Yogi Adityanath, Amit Shah and other political figures.
