= 1974 Uttar Pradesh Legislative Assembly election =

- 24 and 26 February 1974

All 424 seats in the Uttar Pradesh Legislative Assembly 213 seats needed for a majority
- Registered: 49,743,193
- Turnout: 56.91%
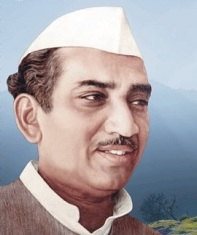

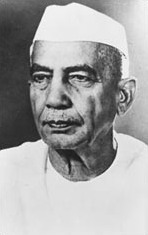
	Majority party	Minority party
Leader	Hemwati Nandan Bahuguna	Charan Singh
Party	INC(R)	BKD
Leader's seat	Bara	Chhaprauli
Seats won	215	106
Seat change	▲4	▲8
Popular vote	32.29%	21.22%
CM before election
Hemwati Bahuguna
INC
Elected CM
Hemwati Bahuguna
INC

Elections to the Uttar Pradesh Legislative Assembly were held in February 1974 to elect members of the 424 constituencies in Uttar Pradesh, India. The Indian National Congress, won a majority of seats and Hemwati Nandan Bahuguna was appointed the Chief Minister of Uttar Pradesh.

== Result ==
Party	Votes	%	Seats	+/–
Indian National Congress	8,868,229	32.29	215	+4
Bharatiya Kranti Dal	5,826,256	21.22	106	+8
Bharatiya Jana Sangh	4,701,972	17.12	61	+12
Indian National Congress (Organisation)	2,296,883	8.36	10	New
Socialist Party (India, 1971)	795,770	2.90	5	New
Communist Party of India	672,881	2.45	16	+12
Indian Union Muslim League	378,221	1.38	1	New
Swatantra Party	311,669	1.13	1	–4
Communist Party of India (Marxist)	194,257	0.71	2	+1
Shoshit Samaj Dal	190,259	0.69	1	New
Hindu Mahasabha	81,829	0.30	1	0
Others	327,246	1.19	0	0
Independents	2,815,747	10.25	5	–13
Total	27,461,219	100.00	424	–1
Valid votes	27,461,219	97.00		
Invalid/blank votes	849,448	3.00		
Total votes	28,310,667	100.00		
Registered voters/turnout	49,743,193	56.91		
Source: ECI

== Elected members ==
Constituency	Reserved for (SC/ST/None)	Member	Party
Uttar Kashi	SC	Baldev Singh Arya	Indian National Congress
Tehri	None	Govind Singh	Communist Party of India
Deoprayag	None	Govind Prasad Gairola	Indian National Congress
Lansdowne	None	Bharat Singh	Indian National Congress
Pauri	None	Bhagwati Charan	Indian National Congress
Karanprayag	None	Shiva Nand Nautiyal	Indian National Congress
Badri Kedar	None	Narendra Singh	Indian National Congress
Didihat	None	Gopal Dutt Ojha	Indian National Congress
Pithoragarh	None	Dayakishan Pandey	Indian National Congress
Almora	None	Rama	Indian National Congress
Bageshwar	SC	Saraswati Tamta	Indian National Congress
Ranikhet	None	Govind Singh	Indian National Congress
Naini Tal	None	Bal Krishna Sanwal	Indian National Congress
Khatima	SC	Indra Lal	Indian National Congress
Haldwani	None	Deo Bahadur Singh	Indian National Congress
Kashipur	None	Narayan Datt Tewari	Indian National Congress
Seohara	None	Abdul Waheed	Bharatiya Kranti Dal
Dhampur	None	Sattar Ahmad	Indian National Congress
Afzalgarh	None	Kranti Kumar	Indian National Congress
Nagina	SC	Ganga Dai	Indian National Congress
Najibabad	SC	Sukhan Singh	Indian National Congress
Bijnor	None	Azizur Rahman	Indian National Congress
Chandpur	None	Dharama Vir Singh	Bharatiya Kranti Dal
Kanth	None	Chandra Pal Singh	Bharatiya Kranti Dal
Amroha	None	Mohd Hayat	Indian National Congress
Hasanpur	None	Mahendra Singh	Bharatiya Kranti Dal
Gangeshwari	SC	Maniram	Bharatiya Kranti Dal
Sambhal	None	Shafiqur Rehman Barq	Bharatiya Kranti Dal
Bahjoi	None	Sultan Singh	Bharatiya Kranti Dal
Chandausi	SC	Devi Singh	Bharatiya Kranti Dal
Kunderki	None	Indra Mohini	Indian National Congress
Moradabad West	None	Khayali Ram Shashtri	Indian National Congress
Moradabad	None	Dinesh Chander Rastogi	Bharatiya Jana Sangh
Moradabad Rural	None	Om Prakash	Independent
Thakurdwara	None	Rampal Singh	Indian National Congress
Suar Tanda	None	Syed Murtaza Alli Khan	Indian National Congress
Rampur	None	Manzoor Ali Khan Alias Shanu Khan	Indian National Congress
Bilaspur	None	Sohan Lal R/o Milak	Bharatiya Kranti Dal
Shahabad	SC	Bansi Dhar	Indian National Congress
Bisauli	None	Krishan Vir Singh	Bharatiya Kranti Dal
Gunnaur	None	Jugal Kishore	Bharatiya Kranti Dal
Sahaswan	None	Shanti Devi	Bharatiya Kranti Dal
Bilsi	SC	Sohan Lal	Bharatiya Jana Sangh
Budaun	None	Purshottam Lal Urf Raja Ji	Indian National Congress
Usehat	None	Brijpal Singh	Bharatiya Jana Sangh
Binawar	None	Mohd. Asrar Ahmad	Bharatiya Kranti Dal
Dataganj	None	Santosh Kumari	Indian National Congress
Aonla	None	Shyam Behari Singh	Bharatiya Jana Sangh
Sunha	None	Rameshwar Nath Chaubey	Indian National Congress
Faridpur	SC	Hem Raj	Bharatiya Kranti Dal
Bareilly Cantt	None	Badam Singh	Bharatiya Jana Sangh
Barelly City	None	Satya Prakash	Bharatiya Jana Sangh
Nawabganj	None	Chetram Gangwar	Indian National Congress
Bhojipura	None	Harish Kumar Gangwar	Bharatiya Jana Sangh
Kawar	None	Misar Yar Khan	Bharatiya Kranti Dal
Baheri	None	Ram Murti	Indian National Congress
Pilibhit	None	Dhirendra Sahai	Bharatiya Kranti Dal
Barkhera	SC	Kishan Lal	Bharatiya Jana Sangh
Bisalpur	None	Tej Bahadur	Indian National Congress
Puranpur	None	Harish Chandra	Bharatiya Jana Sangh
Powayan	SC	Roop Ram	Indian National Congress
Nigohi	None	Om Prakash	Bharatiya Kranti Dal
Tilhar	None	Satyapal Singh	Bharatiya Jana Sangh
Jalalabad	None	Dal Singh Yadav	Bharatiya Jana Sangh
Dadraul	None	Girja Kirhore Misra	Independent
Shahjahanpur	None	Mohammad Rafi Khan	Indian National Congress
Mohamdi	SC	Manna Lal	Bharatiya Jana Sangh
Haiderabad	None	Makhan Lal Misra	Indian National Congress
Paila	SC	Chheda Lal Chowdhery	Indian National Congress
Lakhimpur	None	Tej Narain Trivedi	Indian National Congress
Srinagar	None	Raj Brij Raj Singh	Bharatiya Jana Sangh
Nighasan	None	Ramcharan Shah	Bharatiya Jana Sangh
Dhaurehra	None	Saraswati Pratap Singh	Independent
Behta	None	Ganga Swarup	Indian National Congress
Biswan	None	Gaya Prasad Mehrotra	Bharatiya Jana Sangh
Mahmudabad	None	Ammar Rizvi	Indian National Congress
Sidhauli	SC	Shyam Lal Rawat	Indian National Congress
Laharpur	None	Abid Ali	Indian National Congress
Sitapur	None	Shyam Kishor	Indian National Congress
Hargaon	SC	Ram Lal Rahi	Indian National Congress
Misrikh	None	Ram Ratan Singh	Indian National Congress
Machhrehta	SC	Virendra Kumar Chaudhri	Indian National Congress
Benigang	ST	Ageny Lal	Bharatiya Jana Sangh
Sandila	None	Kashi Nath	Bharatiya Jana Sangh
Ahirori	SC	Manni Lal	Indian National Congress
Hardoi	None	Shrish Chandra	Indian National Congress
Bawan	SC	Pooran Lal	Bharatiya Jana Sangh
Pihani	None	Mahesh Singh	Indian National Congress
Shahabad	None	Dadhich Singh	Bharatiya Jana Sangh
Bilgram	None	Sharda Bhakt Singh	Bharatiya Jana Sangh
Mallawan	None	Lalan Sharma	Indian National Congress
Bangarmau	None	Raghvendra Singh	Bharatiya Kranti Dal
Safirpur	SC	Sunder Lal	Bharatiya Kranti Dal
Unnao	None	Sheo Pal Singh	Bharatiya Kranti Dal
Hadha	None	Sachhiada Nand	Indian National Congress
Bhagwantnagar	None	Bhagwati Singh Visharad	Indian National Congress
Purwa	None	Gaya Singh	Indian National Congress
Hasanganj	SC	Bhikha Lal	Communist Party of India
Malihabad	SC	Kallash Pati	Indian National Congress
Mahona	None	Rampal Trivedi	Indian National Congress
Lucknow East	None	Saroop Kumari Bakshi	Indian National Congress
Lucknow West	None	Mohd. Shakeel Ahmed	Indian National Congress
Lucknow Central	None	Ramesh Chandra Srivastva	Indian National Congress
Lucknow Cantt	None	Charan Singh	Indian National Congress
Sarojininagar	None	Vijai Kumar	Indian National Congress
Mohanlalganj	SC	Narain Das	Indian National Congress
Bachhrawan	SC	Ram Dularey	Indian National Congress
Tiloi	None	Mohan Singh	Indian National Congress
Rae Bareli	None	Sunita Chauhan	Indian National Congress
Sataon	None	Ram Deo Yadav	Indian National Congress
Sareni	None	Shiva Shankar Singh	Indian National Congress
Dalmau	None	Mannu Lal Dwivedi	Indian National Congress
Salon	SC	Dina Nath	Bharatiya Kranti Dal
Kunda	None	Niyaz Husan Khan	Indian National Congress
Bihar	SC	Ram Swaroop Bhartiya	Bharatiya Kranti Dal
Rampur Khas	None	Babu Prabhakar Singh	Indian National Congress
Gadwara	None	Vasudeo Singh	Indian National Congress
Pratapgarh	None	Ajeet Pratap Singh	Indian National Congress
Birapur	None	Sheo Kumari Dubey	Indian National Congress
Patti	None	Prabhakar Nath Dwivedi	Indian National Congress
Amethi	None	Raja Rananjai Singh	Indian National Congress
Gauriganj	None	Rajpati Devi	Indian National Congress
Jagdishpur	SC	Ram Sewak Dhobi	Indian National Congress
Issauli	None	Ambika Prasad Singh	Indian National Congress
Sultanpur	None	Jitendra Kumar	Bharatiya Jana Sangh
Jaisinghpur	None	Sheo Kumar Pandey	Indian National Congress
Chanda	None	Kunwar Shripal Singh	Bharatiya Jana Sangh
Kadipur	SC	Jairaj Gautam	Indian National Congress
Ketehri	None	Bhagwati Prasad Shukla	Indian National Congress
Akbarpur	None	Priya Darshi Jetiy	Indian National Congress
Jalalpur	None	Bhagwati Prasad	Communist Party of India
Jahagirganj	SC	Ram Rati Devi	Indian National Congress
Tanda	None	Nisar Ahmad Ansari	Indian National Congress
Ayodhya	None	Bed Prakash Agarwal	Bharatiya Jana Sangh
Bikapur	None	Sita Ram Nishad	Bharatiya Kranti Dal
Milkipur	None	Dharam Chandra	Indian National Congress
Sohawal	SC	Hub Raj	Indian National Congress
Rudauli	None	Ram Sevak Yadava	Bharatiya Kranti Dal
Daryabad	None	Beni Prasad	Bharatiya Kranti Dal
Sidhaur	SC	Sheokailash	Bharatiya Kranti Dal
Haidergarh	None	Jang Bahadur	Bharatiya Kranti Dal
Masauli	None	Mohsina Kidwai	Indian National Congress
Nawabganj	None	Ram Chandra Bux Singh	Communist Party of India
Fatehpur	SC	Nanhey Lal	Bharatiya Kranti Dal
Ramnagar	None	Bhagauti Prasad	Indian National Congress
Kaisarganj	None	Babu Lal Verma	Bharatiya Jana Sangh
Fakherpur	None	Ram Harsh Chaudhri	Indian National Congress
Mahsi	None	Sukhad Raj Singh	Bharatiya Jana Sangh
Nanpara	None	Fajalu Rehman	Communist Party of India
Charda	SC	Gajadhar Prasad Arya	Bharatiya Jana Sangh
Bhinga	None	Kamla Prasad Varma	Bharatiya Jana Sangh
Bahraich	None	Kedar Nath Agarwal	Indian National Congress
Ikauna	SC	Dulara Devi	Indian National Congress
Gainsari	None	Vijai Pal Singh	Bharatiya Jana Sangh
Tulsipur	None	Mangrey Singh	Bharatiya Jana Sangh
Balrampur	None	Man Bahadur Singh	Indian National Congress
Utraula	None	Rajendra Prasad	Bharatiya Jana Sangh
Sadulla Nagar	None	Dashrath Singh	Bharatiya Jana Sangh
Mankapur	SC	Ram Garib	Indian National Congress
Majehna	None	Deep Narain Mahanth	Indian National Congress
Gonda	None	Triveni Sahai	Bharatiya Jana Sangh
Katra Bazar	None	Deep Narain Pandey	Indian National Congress
Colonelganj	None	Ragharaj Singh	Indian National Congress
Dixit	SC	Ram Pati	Bharatiya Jana Sangh
Haraiya	None	Surendra Pratap Narain	Indian National Congress
Captainganj	None	Ram Lakhan	Indian National Congress
Nagar East	SC	Sohan Lal Dhusia	Indian National Congress
Basti	None	Shyama Devi	Indian National Congress
Ramnagar	None	Ram Samujh	Indian National Congress
Domariaganj	None	Jalil Abbasi	Indian National Congress
Itwa	None	Gopinath Kameshwar Puri	Indian National Congress
Shohratgarh	None	Prabhu Dayal	Indian National Congress
Naugarh	None	Ram Rekha Yadav	Bharatiya Jana Sangh
Bansi	None	Madhava Prasad Tripathi	Bharatiya Jana Sangh
Khesraha	None	Raj Bahadur Chand	Indian National Congress
Menhdawal	None	Chandra Sekhar Singh	Bharatiya Jana Sangh
Khalilabad	SC	Laloo Ram	Indian National Congress
Hansarbazar	SC	Bhisham	Bharatiya Kranti Dal
Banisgaon	SC	Mahabir Prasad	Indian National Congress
Dhuriapar	None	Chandra Shakhar	Indian National Congress
Chillupar	None	Bhrigu Nath	Indian National Congress
Kauri Ram	None	Dhruva Narain Singh	Indian National Congress
Mundera Bazar	SC	Phirangi Prasad	Bharatiya Kranti Dal
Pipraich	None	Madhukak Deghe	Bharatiya Kranti Dal
Gorakhpur	None	Awadhesh Kumar	Bharatiya Jana Sangh
Maniram	None	Avaidya Nath	Hindu Mahasabha
Sahjanwan	None	Sharda	Bharatiya Kranti Dal
Paniara	None	Bir Bahadur Singh	Indian National Congress
Pharenda	None	Lakshmi Narain	Communist Party of India
Lakshmipur	None	Abdul Rauf Lari	Bharatiya Kranti Dal
Siswa	None	Yadwendra Singh Alias Lallan Ji	Indian National Congress
Maharajganj	SC	Duryodhan	Indian National Congress
Shyam Deurwa	None	Janardan Prasad Ojha	Socialist Party
Naurangia	SC	Bhulai Bhai	Bharatiya Jana Sangh
Ramkola	None	Bankey Lal	Bharatiya Kranti Dal
Hata	SC	Gulab Chand	Indian National Congress
Padrauna	None	Purushottam	Bharatiya Kranti Dal
Seorahi	None	Kripa Shankar	Bharatiya Kranti Dal
Fazilnagar	None	Ramayan Rai	Indian National Congress
Kasia	None	Raj Mangal Pandey	Indian National Congress
Gauri Bazar	None	Anirudh	Indian National Congress
Rudrapur	None	Rajendra Prasad Gupta	Indian National Congress
Deoria	None	Krishna Rai	Bharatiya Kranti Dal
Bhatpar Rani	None	Raghuraj Singh	Indian National Congress
Salempur	None	Hari Kewal Prasad	Socialist Party
Barhaj	None	Surendra Prasad Misra	Indian National Congress
Ghosi	None	Zafar Azami	Communist Party of India
Sagri	None	Ram Sunder Pandey	Indian National Congress
Gopalpur	None	Ram Adhar	Bharatiya Kranti Dal
Azamgarh	None	Vishram	Bharatiya Kranti Dal
Nizamabad	None	M. Masud	Bharatiya Kranti Dal
Atraulia	None	Jang Bahadur	Indian National Congress
Phulpur	None	Ram Bachan	Bharatiya Kranti Dal
Saraimir	SC	Daya Ram Bhasker	Bharatiya Kranti Dal
Mehnagar	SC	Jang Bahadur	Bharatiya Kranti Dal
Lalganj	None	Triveni	Indian National Congress
Mubarakpur	None	Bhabhi	Bharatiya Kranti Dal
Mohammadabad Gohna	SC	Sheo Prasad	Bharatiya Kranti Dal
Mau	None	Abdul Baqi	Communist Party of India
Rasra	SC	Raghu Nath	Communist Party of India
Siar	None	Rafiullah	Indian National Congress
Chilkahar	None	Jagannath Chaudhry	Indian National Congress
Sikanderpur	None	Nirbhai Narain Singh Alias Lal Babu	Indian National Congress
Bansdih	None	Bacha Pathak	Indian National Congress
Doaba	None	Banwari	Indian National Congress
Ballia	None	Kashi Nath Mishra	Indian National Congress
Kopachit	None	Kailash Singh	Bharatiya Kranti Dal
Zahoorabad	None	Raghubir	Bharatiya Kranti Dal
Mohammadabad	None	Ram Janam Rai	Bharatiya Kranti Dal
Didarnagar	None	Ramji	Bharatiya Kranti Dal
Zamania	None	Dharam Ram	Bharatiya Kranti Dal
Ghazipur	None	Shah Abdul Faiz	Bharatiya Kranti Dal
Jakhania	SC	Jhilmit	Bharatiya Kranti Dal
Sadat	None	Kalicharan	Bharatiya Kranti Dal
Saidpur	None	Prabhu Narain	Indian National Congress
Dhanapur	None	Baijnath	Bharatiya Kranti Dal
Chandauli	None	Ram Pyare	Bharatiya Kranti Dal
Chakia	SC	Bechan Ram	Indian National Congress
Mogalsarai	None	Ganji Prasad	Bharatiya Kranti Dal
Varanasi Cantt	None	Shatrudh Prakash	Bharatiya Kranti Dal
Varanasi South	None	Charan Das Seth	Bharatiya Jana Sangh
Varanasi North	None	Mohammad Safiur Raham Ansari	Indian National Congress
Chiralgaon	None	Udai Nath	Bharatiya Kranti Dal
Kolasla	None	Udal	Communist Party of India
Gangapur	None	Baldeo	Bharatiya Kranti Dal
Aurai	None	Girija Shankar Pathak	Bharatiya Kranti Dal
Gyanpur	None	Ramarati	Bharatiya Kranti Dal
Bhadohi	SC	Ram Nihor	Bharatiya Kranti Dal
Barsathi	None	Naju Ram	Bharatiya Kranti Dal
Mariahu	None	Raj Kishore	Indian National Congress
Kerakat	SC	Ram Samjhawan	Indian National Congress
Beyalsi	None	Uma Nath	Bharatiya Jana Sangh
Jaunpur	None	Om Parkash	Indian National Congress
Rari	None	Raj Bahadur	Bharatiya Kranti Dal
Shahganj	SC	Mata Prasad	Indian National Congress
Khutahan	None	Lakshmi Shanker Yadava	Indian National Congress
Garwara	None	Ram Shiromani Dubey	Indian National Congress
Machhilishahr	None	Aga Zaidi	Indian National Congress
Dudhi	SC	Shiv Sampat	Bharatiya Jana Sangh
Robertaganj	SC	Subedar	Bharatiya Jana Sangh
Rajgarh	None	Lokapati	Indian National Congress
Chunar	None	Om Prakash	Bharatiya Jana Sangh
Majhwa	None	Rudra Prasad	Indian National Congress
Mirzapur	None	Asha Ram	Bharatiya Jana Sangh
Chhanvey	SC	Purushottam Das	Indian National Congress
Meja	SC	Ram Deo	Indian National Congress
Karchana	None	Reoti Raman Singh Alias Mani Ji	Indian National Congress
Bara	None	Hemwati Nandan Bahuguna	Indian National Congress
Jhusi	None	Vidya Dhar	Indian National Congress
Handia	None	Athai Ram	Bharatiya Kranti Dal
Pratappur	None	Har Patap Singh	Bharatiya Kranti Dal
Soraon	None	Jang Bahadur Singh Patel	Bharatiya Kranti Dal
Nawabganj	None	Ram Puajn Patel	Indian National Congress
Allahabad North	None	Rajendra Kumari Bajpai	Indian National Congress
Allahabad South	None	Satya Prakash Malviya	Bharatiya Kranti Dal
Allahabad West	None	Tirath Ram Kohili	Bharatiya Jana Sangh
Chail	SC	Kanyaiya Lal Sonkar	Indian National Congress
Majhanpur	SC	Dharam Vir	Indian National Congress
Sirathu	None	Baij Nath Kushwaha	Bharatiya Kranti Dal
Khaga	None	Krishna Dutt Alias Balraj	Indian National Congress
Kishunpur	SC	Jageshwar	Indian National Congress
Haswa	None	Jai Narayan Singh	Indian National Congress
Fatehpur	None	Salahuddin Alias Nabban	Indian National Congress
Jahanabad	None	Prem Datta	Indian National Congress
Bindki	None	Rama Kant Dwivedi	Indian National Congress
Aryanagar	None	Abdul Rehman Khan Nashtare	Indian National Congress
Sisamau	SC	Sheo Lal	Indian National Congress
Generalganj	None	Jatadhar Bajpai	Indian National Congress
Kanpur Cantt	None	Shyam Mishra	Indian National Congress
Govindnagar	None	Sant Singh Yusuf	Communist Party of India
Kalyanpur	None	Ram Narain Pathak	Indian National Congress
Sarsaul	None	Ram Autar Singh Bhadauria	Indian National Congress
Ghatampur	None	Kunwar Shiv Nath Singh Kushwaha	Socialist Party
Bhognipur	SC	Keshri Lal	Bharatiya Kranti Dal
Rajpur	None	Randhir Singh	Shoshit Samaj Dal
Sarvankhera	None	Balwan Singh	Bharatiya Kranti Dal
Chaubepur	None	Jagdish Awasthi	Indian National Congress
Bilhaur	SC	Moti Lal Dehalvi	Bharatiya Kranti Dal
Derapur	None	Ram Pal Singh Yadav	Socialist Party
Auraiya	None	Bharat Singh Chauhan	Bharatiya Kranti Dal
Ajitmal	SC	Gauri Shankar	Indian National Congress
Lakhna	SC	Ram Lakhan	Bharatiya Jana Sangh
Etawah	None	Sukhda Misra	Indian National Congress
Jaswantnagar	None	Mulayam Singh	Bharatiya Kranti Dal
Bharthana	None	Gore Lal Shakya	Indian National Congress
Bidhuna	None	Gajendra Singh	Indian National Congress
Kannauj	SC	Jham Lal Ahirwar	Bharatiya Jana Sangh
Umardha	None	Dharampal Singh	Bharatiya Jana Sangh
Chhibramau	None	Ram Prakash Tripathi	Bharatiya Jana Sangh
Kamalganj	None	Anwar Jamil Alias Jimmi Mia	Indian National Congress
Farrukhabad	None	Vimla Prasad	Indian National Congress
Kaimganj	None	Anwar Mohammad	Independent
Mohammadabad	None	Rajendra Singh Yadav	Independent
Manikpur	SC	Laxmi Prasad	Bharatiya Jana Sangh
Karwi	None	Ram Sajiwan	Communist Party of India
Baberu	None	Deo Kumar	Communist Party of India
Tindwai	None	Jagannath Singh	Bharatiya Jana Sangh
Banda	None	Jamuna Prasad	Socialist Party
Naraini	None	Chandrabhan Azad	Communist Party of India
Hamirpur	None	Pratap Narain	Indian National Congress
Maudaha	None	Kunwar Bahadur Mishra	Indian National Congress
Rath	None	Swami Prasad Singh	Indian National Congress
Charkhari	SC	Kashi Prasad	Bharatiya Kranti Dal
Mahoba	None	Chandra Narain Singh	Indian National Congress
Mehroni	None	Raghunath Singh	Bharatiya Jana Sangh
Lalitpur	None	Chandan Singh	Communist Party of India
Jhansi	None	Baboo Lal Tiwari	Indian National Congress
Babina	SC	Bhagwat Dayal	Bharatiya Jana Sangh
Mauranipur	SC	Beni Bai	Indian National Congress
Garoutha	None	Ranjeet Singh Jasdev	Indian National Congress
Konch	SC	Malkhan Singh	Bharatiya Jana Sangh
Orai	None	Anandswaroop	Indian National Congress
Kalpi	None	Birsingh	Bharatiya Jana Sangh
Madhogarh	None	Rajendra Shah	Indian National Congress
Bhongaon	None	Jagdish Narain Tripathi	Communist Party of India
Kishni	SC	Munshi Lal	Indian National Congress
Karhal	None	Nathu Singh	Bharatiya Kranti Dal
Shikohabad	None	Virendra Swaroop	Bharatiya Kranti Dal
Jasrana	None	Balbir Singh	Bharatiya Kranti Dal
Ghiror	None	Raghubir Singh	Bharatiya Kranti Dal
Mainpuri	None	Baba Ram Nath	Communist Party of India
Aliganj	None	Latoori Singh	Indian National Congress
Patiali	None	Malik Mohammad Zamir Khan	Indian National Congress
Sakit	None	Pyarey Lal	Bharatiya Jana Sangh
Soron	None	Khuv Chand	Bharatiya Kranti Dal
Kasganj	None	Man Pal Singh	Indian National Congress
Etah	None	Ganga Prasad	Indian National Congress
Nidhauli Kalan	None	Ganga Singh	Bharatiya Kranti Dal
Jalesar	SC	Nathu Ram	Indian National Congress
Firozabad	None	Mohammad Ayub	Indian Union Muslim League
Bah	None	Mahendra Ripujaman Singh	Swatantra Party
Fatehbad	None	Rajendra Prasad Doneria	Indian National Congress
Tundla	SC	Ramji Lal Kain	Indian National Congress
Etmadpur	SC	Shiv Charan Lal	Bharatiya Kranti Dal
Dayal Bagh	None	Multan Singh	Bharatiya Kranti Dal
Agra Cantt	None	Krishna Vir Singh Kaushal	Indian National Congress
Agra East	None	Prakash Narain Gupta	Indian National Congress
Agra West	SC	Gulab Sehra	Indian National Congress
Kheragarh	None	Shiv Prasad	Indian National Congress
Fatehpur Sikri	None	Champawati	Indian National Congress
Goverdhan	SC	Gynendra Swaroop	Bharatiya Kranti Dal
Mathura	None	Ram Babu R/o Chuna Kanker	Indian National Congress
Chhata	None	Radha Charan	Bharatiya Kranti Dal
Mat	None	Chandan Singh	Bharatiya Kranti Dal
Gokul	None	Gayatri Devi	Bharatiya Kranti Dal
Sadabad	None	Ram Prakash	Bharatiya Kranti Dal
Hathras	None	Narayan Hari Sharma	Indian National Congress
Sasni	SC	Dharampal Singh	Indian National Congress
Sikandra Rao	None	Farzand Ali	Bharatiya Kranti Dal
Gangri	None	Babu Singh	Bharatiya Kranti Dal
Atrauli	None	Kalyan Singh	Bharatiya Jana Sangh
Aligarh	None	Indra Pal Singh	Bharatiya Jana Sangh
Koil	SC	Puran Chand	Indian National Congress
Iglas	None	Rajendra Singh	Bharatiya Kranti Dal
Barauli	None	Surendra Singh	Indian National Congress
Khair	None	Piarey Lal	Indian National Congress
Jewar	SC	Aidal Singh	Bharatiya Kranti Dal
Khurja	None	Ishwari Singh	Indian National Congress
Debai	None	Himmat Singh	Bharatiya Jana Sangh
Anupshahr	None	Khacheru Singh Mohrya	Bharatiya Kranti Dal
Siana	None	Mamtaz Mohammad Khan	Indian National Congress
Agota	None	Bikram Singh	Bharatiya Kranti Dal
Buladshahr	None	Satyabir	Bharatiya Jana Sangh
Shikarpur	SC	Dharam Singh	Indian National Congress
Sikandarabad	None	Virendra Sarup Bhatnagar	Indian National Congress
Dadri	None	Tej Singh	Indian National Congress
Ghaziabad	None	Pyare Lal	Indian National Congress
Muradnagar	None	Rajpal	Indian National Congress
Modinagar	None	Megh Nath Singh	Indian National Congress
Hapur	SC	Bhoop Singh Kain	Indian National Congress
Garh Mukteshwar	None	Manzoor Ahmad S/o Bashir Ahmad	Indian National Congress
Kithore	None	Ram Dayal Singh	Bharatiya Kranti Dal
Hastinapur	SC	Reoti Saran Maurya	Indian National Congress
Sirdhana	None	Nazir Ahmad	Bharatiya Kranti Dal
Meerut Cantt	None	Ajit Singh	Indian National Congress
Meerut	None	Mohan Lal Kapoor	Bharatiya Jana Sangh
Kharkhauda	None	Prem Sunder Narain Singh	Indian National Congress
Siwal Khas	SC	Ramjilal Sahayak	Indian National Congress
Khekra	None	Chhajju Singh	Bharatiya Kranti Dal
Baghpat	None	Satyapal Malik	Bharatiya Kranti Dal
Barnawa	None	Dharam Vir Singh	Bharatiya Kranti Dal
Chhaprauli	None	Charan Singh	Bharatiya Kranti Dal
Kandhla	None	Mool Chand	Bharatiya Kranti Dal
Khatauli	None	Laxman Singh	Bharatiya Kranti Dal
Jansath	SC	Qabool Singh	Bharatiya Kranti Dal
Morna	None	Narain Singh	Indian National Congress
Muzaffarnagar	None	Chitranjan Swarup	Indian National Congress
Charthawal	SC	Nandram	Bharatiya Kranti Dal
Baghra	None	Virendra Verma	Indian National Congress
Kairana	None	Hukam Singh	Indian National Congress
Thana Bhawan	None	Malkhan Singh	Indian National Congress
Nakur	None	Yashpal Singh	Indian National Congress
Sarsawa	None	Mohd. Mahmood Ali Khan	Indian National Congress
Nagal	SC	Hari Ram	Indian National Congress
Deoband	None	Mahabir Singh	Indian National Congress
Harora	SC	Shakuntala Devi	Indian National Congress
Saharanpur	None	S . Kultar Singh	Indian National Congress
Muzaffarabad	None	Mohd Aslam	Indian National Congress
Roorkee	None	Rao Mushtaq	Bharatiya Kranti Dal
Lhaksar	None	Q . Mohd. Mohiuddin	Bharatiya Kranti Dal
Hardwar	None	Rajendra Kumar Garg	Communist Party of India
Mussoorie	None	Shanti Prapauna Sharma	Indian National Congress
Dehra Dun	None	Bhola Datt Saklani	Indian National Congress
Chakrata	ST	Gulab Singh	Indian National Congress

== See also ==
- List of constituencies of the Uttar Pradesh Legislative Assembly
- 1974 elections in India
