= Ramakant Yadav (politician) =

Indian politician

Member of Uttar Pradesh Legislative Assembly
- Incumbent
- Assumed office 2022
- Preceded by: Arun Kumar Yadav
- In office 1993–1996
- Preceded by: "Himself"
- Succeeded by: Ram Naresh Yadav
- In office 1991–1993
- Preceded by: "Himself"
- Succeeded by: "Himself"
- In office 1989–1991
- Preceded by: "Himself"
- Succeeded by: "Himself"
- In office 1985–1989
- Preceded by: Abul Kalam
- Succeeded by: "Himself"
- Constituency: Phoolpur Pawai

Member of Parliament, Lok Sabha
- In office 1996–1998
- Preceded by: Chandrajit Yadav
- Succeeded by: Akbar Ahmad Dumpy
- In office 1999–2008
- Preceded by: Akbar Ahmad Dumpy
- Succeeded by: Akbar Ahmad Dumpy
- In office 2009–2014
- Preceded by: Akbar Ahmad Dumpy
- Succeeded by: Mulayam Singh Yadav
- Constituency: Azamgarh

Personal details
- Born: 1 July 1957 (age 69) Azamgarh, Uttar Pradesh, India
- Party: Samajwadi Party
- Other political affiliations: Indian National Congress; Bahujan Samaj Party; Bharatiya Janata Party; Janata Dal United
- Spouse(s): Ranjana Yadav, Satyabhama yadav
- Children: 4 sons and 1 daughter Arun Kant Yadav, Varun Kant Yadav, Rajni kant Yadav, Rishi Kant Yadav.
- As of 17 September, 2000

Ramakant Yadav (born 1 July 1957) is an Indian gangster and politician belonging to the Samajwadi Party and currently serving as Member of Uttar Pradesh Legislative Assembly representing Phoolpur Pawai and former Member of Lok Sabha representing Azamgarh. He is also known by names like Sher-e-Purvanchal and RKY, he is considered one of the Bahubali ( Strongest leader) of Uttar Pradesh. He is younger brother of Umakant Yadav, a former BSP MP.

== Political career ==
Ramakant Yadav switched from the Samajwadi Party to the Bahujan Samaj Party in 2004 parliament elections, before finally joining the Bharatiya Janata Party in 2008. Samajwadi Party supremo Mulayam Singh Yadav fought member of parliament election against Ramakant Yadav and was able to win with very low margin of 63,204 votes.

In 2009, he won from Azamgarh Lok Sabha as a BJP candidate.

In 2019 he contested from Bhadohi Lok Sabha constituency Loksabha seat on the Congress Party ticket but faced humiliating defeat. He got only 25000 votes. In the 2022 assembly elections, he defeated his opponent Ramsoorat Rajbhar by 25000 votes and worked to win 10 seats of Azamgarh.

== Positions held ==
1985–95	Member, Uttar Pradesh Legislative Assembly (four terms)
1996	Elected to 11th Lok Sabha
1999	Re-elected to 13th Lok Sabha (2nd term)
1999–2004	Member, Committee on Commerce
2000–2004	Member, Consultative Committee, Ministry of Railways
2004	Re-elected to 14th Lok Sabha (3rd term)
2004–2008	Member, Committee on Food, Consumer Affairs & Public Distribution
2008	Ceased to be a member w.e.f. 28.1.2008
2009	Re-elected to 15th Lok Sabha (4th term)
31 Aug. 2009	Member, Committee on Food, Consumer Affairs and Public Distribution
5 Oct 2019	Joined Samajwadi Party..
2022	Member, Uttar Pradesh Legislative Assembly (fifth term)
