= Ram Naresh Yadav =

Indian politician (1928–2016)

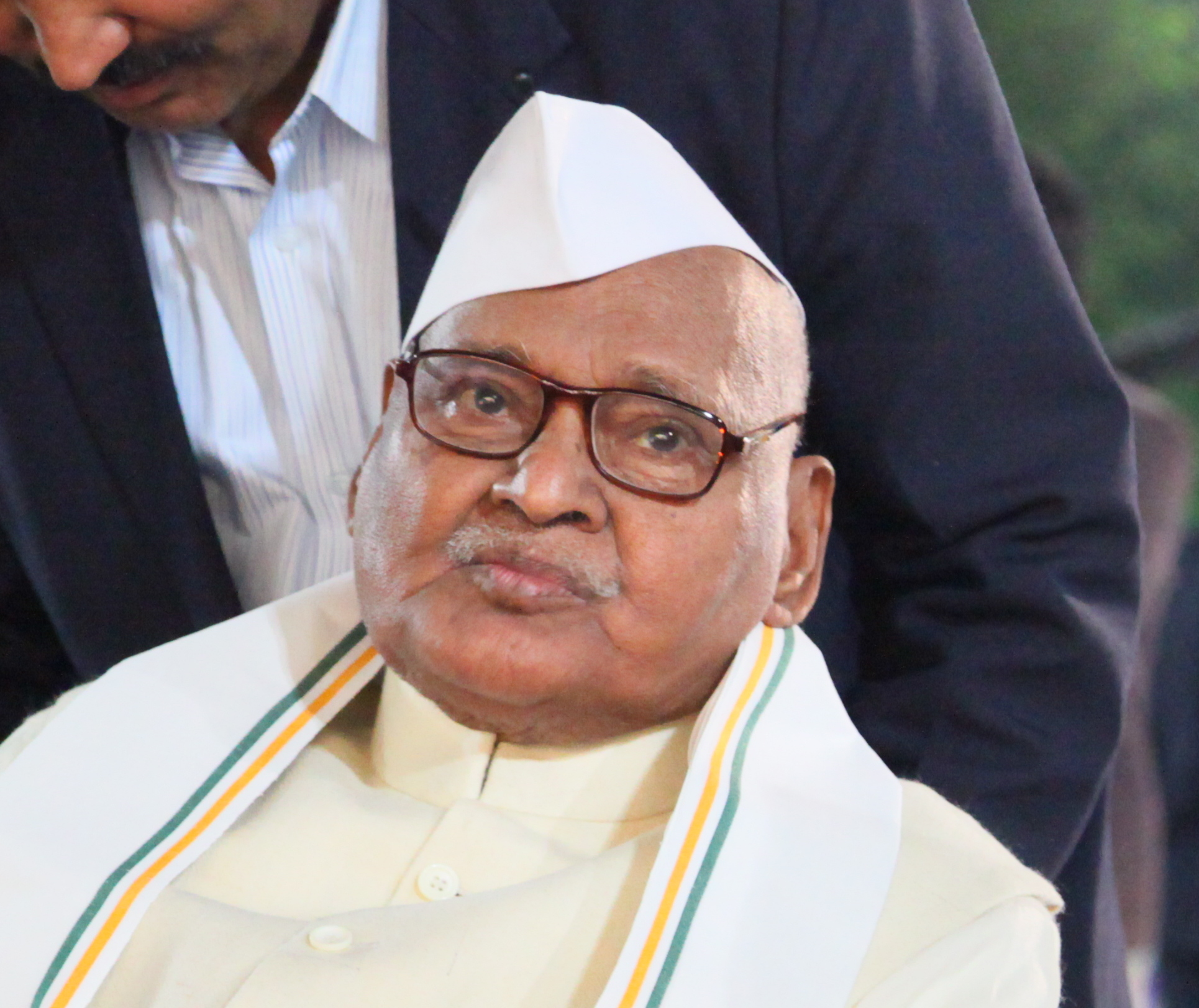

10th Chief Minister of Uttar Pradesh
- In office 23 June 1977 – 28 February 1979
- Preceded by: President's rule
- Succeeded by: Banarsi Das

Deputy Chief Minister of Uttar Pradesh
- In office 28 February 1979 – 17 February 1980
- Chief Minister: Banarasi Das
- Preceded by: Kamalapati Tripathi
- Succeeded by: Keshav Prasad Maurya, Dinesh Sharma

16th Governor of Madhya Pradesh
- In office 8 September 2011 – 7 September 2016
- Chief Minister: Shivraj Singh Chouhan
- Preceded by: Rameshwar Thakur
- Succeeded by: Om Prakash Kohli (Additional Charge)

Personal details
- Born: 1 July 1928 Azamgarh, United Provinces of Agra and Oudh, British India (now in Uttar Pradesh, India)
- Died: 22 November 2016 (aged 88) Lucknow, Uttar Pradesh, India
- Party: Indian National Congress
- Other political affiliations: Janata Party
- Spouse: Shrimat Anari Devi Yadav
- Children: Five daughters and three sons

Ram Naresh Yadav (1 July 1928 – 22 November 2016) was an Indian politician who was Chief Minister of Uttar Pradesh from 1977 to 1979 and Governor of Madhya Pradesh from 2011 to 2016. He was from Janata Party; later he joined the Congress. He served as Deputy Chief Minister under the Babu Banarasi Das government from 1979 to 1980. He served as Deputy leader of Rajya Sabha in 1989. He also served as Governor of Chhattisgarh in 2014. (he was also the first INC-non associated member to become chief minister of state)

== Personal life ==
He was born on 1 July 1928 at Azamgarh in Uttar Pradesh. He belonged to a middle-class family. His father was a teacher. Ram Naresh Yadav was a successful lawyer in Azamgarh court. He died on 22 November 2016 in Lucknow.

== Political career ==
Ram Naresh Yadav was interested in social work and was close to socialist leader Raj Narain. He entered the Sixth Lok Sabha in 1977 from Azamgarh constituency. He was considered a modest and a low-profile politician.

He became Chief Minister of Uttar Pradesh on 23 June 1977, and remained on the post till 28 February 1979. On 25 February 1979, he failed to secure a vote of confidence. Banarsi Das was elected in his place and became Chief Minister.

In 2004 general elections, he contested from Azamgarh constituency on Indian National Congress ticket, but lost to Bahujan Samaj Party's Ramakant Yadav. On 26 August 2011, he was appointed Governor of Madhya Pradesh by the President of India, Pratibha Patil, on the recommendation of the UPA government.

== Alleged involvement in Vyapam scam ==
On February 24, 2015, Madhya Pradesh Special Task Force (STF) filed an FIR against Yadav for his alleged role in the multi-crore Madhya Pradesh Professional Examination Board (MPPEB) scam (Vyapam scam). He was charged with rigging the forest guard recruitment examination, conducted by Vyapam, and booked under the Information Technology Act and the Prevention of Corruption Act. The FIR was registered after an MP High Court hearing where Chief Justice A M Khanvilkar and Justice Alok Aradhe said STF can freely proceed against any "high dignitary". Yadav moved the high court citing constitutional immunity, which subsequently in April asked STF to "observe complete protocol", the Governor being the Head of the State. The head of the special investigative team (SIT) probing the scam said that action will be taken after his retirement in September, 2016. Meanwhile, a group of lawyers filed a petition in Supreme Court of India, seeking removal of Yadav and recording his statement in the case. A bench comprising Chief Justice of India H. L. Dattu and Justices Arun Kumar Mishra and Amitava Roy agreed to hear the petition on July 9.

Earlier in 2013, STF arrested his former OSD Dhanraj Yadav in connection with the scam. Also, his son Shailesh was an accused in the MPPEB contractual teachers' recruitment exam, and reportedly died of a brain haemorrhage in March, at Yadav's Lucknow residence.

== See also ==
- Ram Naresh Yadav ministry (1977–79)

Lok Sabha
Preceded by Chandrajit Yadav	Member of Parliament for Azamgarh; 1977–1978	Succeeded by Mohsina Kidwai
