= Sabahuddin Abdur Rahman =

Indian historian and writer (1911–1987)

Syed Sabahuddin Abdur Rahman
- Born: Abdur Rahman c. 1911; Bihar Sharif, Nalanda district, Bihar
- Died: 8 November 1987 (aged 75–76); Lucknow, Uttar Pradesh
- Education: Nalanda College, Langat Singh College
- Children: 4

Syed Sabahuddin Abdur Rahman (c. 1911 — 18 November 1987) was an Indian historian and writer. He was the editor of Ma'arif, a monthly journal. He had served as the director and secretary of Darul Musannefin Shibli Academy, a research academy founded by Shibli Nomani and based in Azamgarh.

He has authored many books including Bazm-i Sufiya: Ahd-i Taimuri se Qabl Akabir Sufiya, Bazm-e-Mamlukiya, Bazm-e-Taimuriya, Hindustan Ke Salatin, Ulama aur Masha’ikh ke T‘alluqat par ek Nazar and Musalman Hukmaranon ki Mazhabi Rawadari.

== Early life and education ==
Syed Sabahuddin Abdur Rahman was born in 1911 in Desna near Bihar Sharif area of Nalanda district of Bihar. His ancestors belonged to Desna but he later shifted to the Lucknow.

Together with Syed Sulaiman Nadvi, he received his primary education at Madrasa Al-Islah, in Desna, and then enrolled at Mohammadan Anglo-Arabic School, in Patna in 1920 under the tutelage of his maternal uncle Syed Qamrul Hoda, who was a Mathematics teacher there. Following his studies at Mohammadan Anglo-Arabic School, he enrolled at Nalanda College in July 1925 and completed matriculation in the same year. He later received a B.A. from Langat Singh College in 1927, and an M.A from Patna University, after which he moved to Jamia Millia Islamia as a researcher under the supervision of Muhammad Mujeeb.

== Career ==
In January 1935, Sabahuddin was appointed a teacher in Shibli College, Azamgarh, but he wanted to serve Darul Musannefin Shibli Academy as a researcher. He was called to Darul Musannefin Shibli Academy by Syed Sulaiman Nadvi and he was also included in the Editorial board of Risala Ma'roon in April 1951. He also edit Ma'arif.

== Books ==
One of his works, Babri Masjid: Tarikhi Pasmanzar Aur Peshmanzar Ki Roshni Mein, a treatise quoted in the Babri Masjid case. Syed Sabahuddin Abdur Rahman has written in his book Babri Masjid: Tarikhi Pasmanzar Aur Peshmanzar Ki Roshni Mein that Babri Masjid was built by Babar after demolishing Ram Janam Bhumi Mandir. His books include:

- Bazm-e-Taimuriya, 1948
- Hindustan Ke Ahd-e-Usta Ka Fauzi Nizam, 1960
- Sachchi Kahaniyan, 1968
- Dr. Syed Mahmood, 1972
- Bazm-e-taimuriya, 1973
- Ghalib Madh-e-Qadah Ke Roshni Mein, 1979
- Ameer Khusrow Dehlavi: Hayat Aur ShayariIdara, 1979
- Saleebi Jung, 1980
- Islam Aur Mustashriqeen, 1985
- Maulana Shibli Naumaani Par Ek Nazar, 1985
- Babri Masjid: Tarikhi Pasmanzar Aur Peshmanzar Ki Roshni Mein, 1986
- Bazm-e-rafta ki sachchi kahaniyan, 1990
- Sufi Ameer Khusrau, 1992
- Bazm-e-Mamlukiya, 1999
- Madhyakaleen Bharat Ke Musalman Shashakon Ki Dharmik Udarta, 2008
- Zaheeruddin Mohammad Babar, 2015
- Bazm-e-Raftagam Volume 2
- Arshi Sahib
- Hazrat Abul Hasan Ali Hujveri
- Hazrat Khwaja Moinuddin Chishti
- Majalis-e-Sufiya
- Yar-e-azeez

== Personal life ==
Abdur Rahman was father of 4 children including Ishrat Afroz, Musharrat Afroz, Syed Ehteshamur Rahman and Syed Shakirur Rahman.

== Death ==
Syed Sabahuddin Abdur Rahman died on 18 November 1987 in Lucknow, Uttar Pradesh.
