= Najeeb Ashraf Nadvi =

Indian writer (1900–1968)

Syed Najeeb Ashraf Nadvi
- Born: 1 November 1900; Armori, Maharashtra
- Died: 5 September 1968 (aged 67); Bombay, Maharashtra

Academic background
- Education: Darul Uloom Nadwatul Ulama, Calcutta University

Academic work
- Institutions: Ismail Yusuf College

Syed Najeeb Ashraf Nadvi (1 November 1900–5 September 1968) was an Indian historian, writer, critic, translator and Islamic scholar. He served as the director of Anjuman-i-Islam Urdu Research Institute in Mumbai from 1956 until his death in 1968. He had written books including Tark-e-Mawalat Dusre Mamalik Mein and Muqaddama Ruqaat-e-Aalamgiri.

Nadvi was as a researcher at the Darul Musannefin Shibli Academy, in Azamgarh from 1925 to 1930 and later became a professor at Ismail Yousuf College, Mumbai from 1931 to 1956.

== Early life and education ==
Najeeb Ashraf Nadvi was born on 1 November 1900 in Armori, Chaanda district, Maharashtra. His family had ancestral roots in Desna, Bihar. He received his early education in Arabic, Persian, Urdu, and Marathi at his home, and was enrolled at Darul Uloom Nadwatul Ulama, in 1909. He left his studies incomplete at Nadwa due to a student-strike, and moved to an English-medium school in Patna, in 1913. Later, Nadvi moved to Kolkata at the invitation of his brother to pursue higher education. He received a Bachelor of Arts degree from Calcutta University in 1924. He left his education in the 1920s after a Master of Arts degree, to actively participate in the Khilafat Movement and Tark-e-Mavalat Movement.

== Career ==
Najeeb began writing at an early age and joined Darul Musannifeen at the instruction of Syed Sulaiman Nadvi. He remained associated with the institution until 1930. He later taught at Ismail Yusuf College in Bombay from 1931 to 1956, where he contributed in the creation and growth of literary and cultural atmosphere.

== Books ==
Najeeb is known for his discovery and editing of Lughaat-i-Gujari, a book written by unknown author around 1703–04. His other works include:

- Muqaddamah-yi ruqʻāt-i ʻĀlamgīr, 2012.
- Ruqʻāt-i ʻAlamgīr, yaʻnī, Aʻlaḥaz̤rat Sulṭānulhind Muḥammad Aurangzeb ʻĀlamgīr ke khut̤ūt̤ va makātīb
- The Rubâʻîyât of ʻUmar-i Khayyâm

== Death ==
Najeeb died on 5 September 1968 in Bombay.
