= Ma'arif =

Indian Urdu magazine

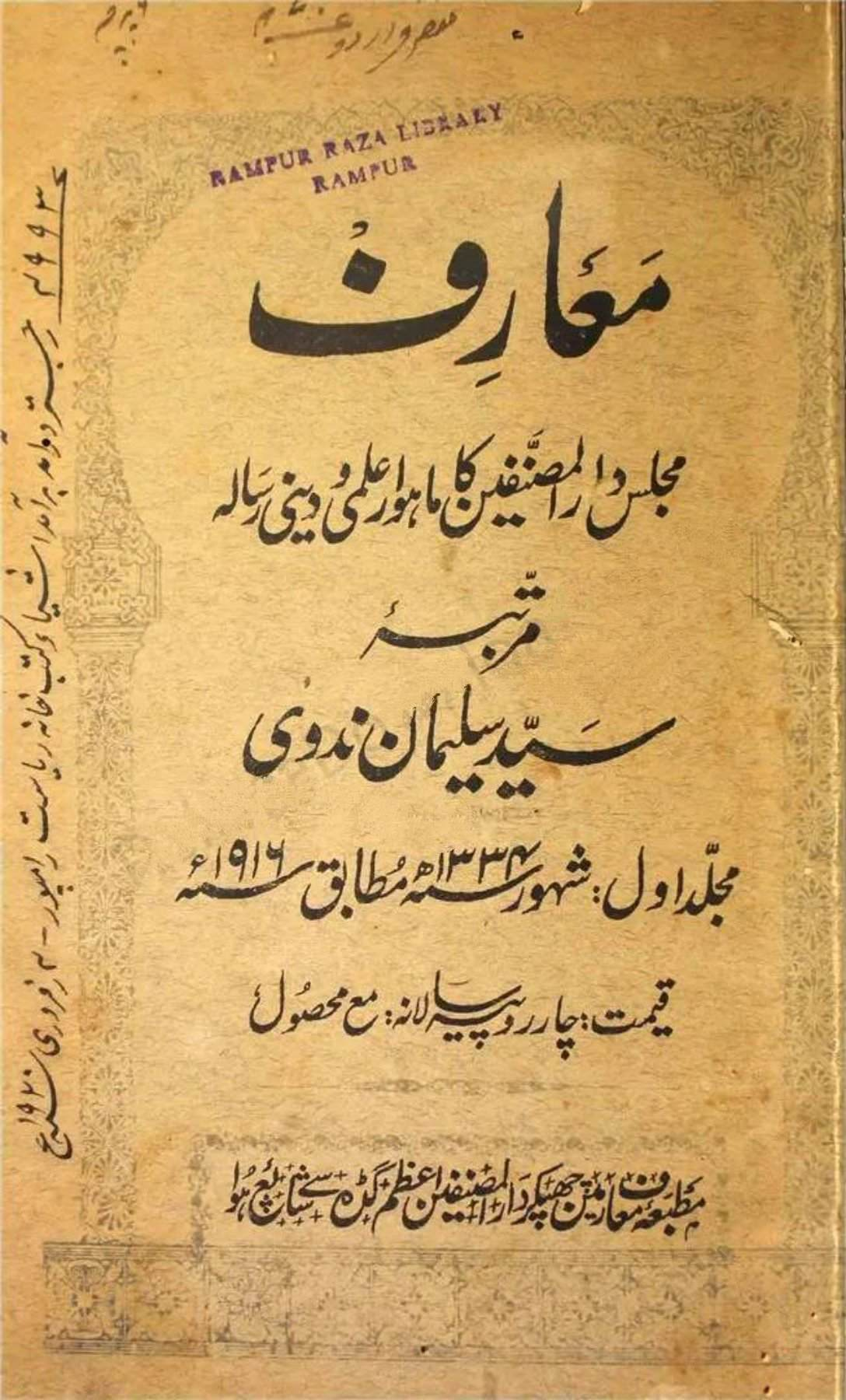
- First issue
- Editor: Zafarul Islam Khan; Umair al-Siddiq Nadvi; Kaleem Sifaat Islahi
- Categories: Theology, Culture, Dawah, Literature, Education
- Frequency: Monthly
- Publisher: Darul Musannefin Shibli Academy
- Founded: 1916
- First issue: July 1916
- Country: India
- Based in: Azamgarh
- Language: Urdu
- Website: shibliacademy.org
- ISSN: 0974-7346

Ma'arif (Urdu: معارف) is an Urdu literary magazine published by the Darul Musannefin Shibli Academy in Azamgarh. Its first issue appeared in July 1916, and the publication has continued since. The magazine was initially proposed by Shibli Nomani, but following his death, it was established and launched by his student Sulaiman Nadvi.

== Background ==
Ma'arif was founded in July 1916 under the auspices of the Darul Musannefin Shibli Academy, which had been formally established in early 1915 based on plans prepared by Shibli Nomani. While Nomani conceived the magazine, it was implemented posthumously by Sulaiman Nadwi, who became its first editor. The magazine was intended to serve as the Academy’s primary platform for scholarly engagement, addressing both classical and contemporary intellectual issues.

The founding editorial board included Sulaiman Nadwi as chief editor, alongside Abdul Majid Daryabadi, Hafiz, and Abdul Salam Nadwi. The magazine’s scope encompassed a wide range of subjects, including philosophy, history, science, literature, poetry, and education. It also aimed to provide critical analyses of classical texts and curated scholarly extracts from journals published in Europe, Egypt, and Beirut.

In its inaugural issue, Nadwi stated that the magazine sought to reinterpret and organize classical Islamic sciences through modern scholarly methods, document the historical development of Islamic knowledge, examine contemporary philosophical ideas, and offer reasoned articulations of Islamic beliefs. It also aimed to present biographies of notable scholars, emphasizing their independent reasoning (ijtihād) and intellectual works, and to review rare or little-known Arabic texts.

Alongside its scholarly content, Ma'arif included literary essays, contemporary debates, and critical commentary to ensure accessibility for a broader readership. Its editorial philosophy was inspired by the integrative and reformative approaches of Abbasid-era scholars, aiming to preserve traditional knowledge while engaging with modern intellectual developments. Since its establishment, the magazine has functioned as a platform for academic inquiry, historical documentation, and intellectual discourse, contributing to the study of Islamic and Eastern scholarship.

== History ==
Since its launch in 1916, Ma’arif has been edited primarily by Sulaiman Nadwi, who managed all editorial responsibilities independently for many years. In 1920, Abdul Majid Daryabadi temporarily assumed editorial duties during Nadwi’s trip to Europe, and in 1936, Moinuddin Ahmad Nadwi oversaw day-to-day editing while Nadwi served as Chief Officer of Religious Affairs in Bhopal. In 1937, Riyasat Ali Nadwi also contributed as editor, writing articles and reviews that had previously been prepared by Nadwi. By 1949, Moinuddin Ahmad Nadwi was formally listed as co-editor, although he had previously managed editorial tasks in practice. Ma’arif has been published continuously for over a century, making it one of the longest-running Urdu magazines.

=== Editors ===
The following is a list of editors and editors-in-chief of Ma'arif since its inception in 1916.

Period	Name(s)	Position	Reference
1916 – 1949	Sulaiman Nadvi	Editor-in-chief	
1920 (for eight months, during Sulaiman Nadvi’s visit to Europe)	Abdul Majid Daryabadi	Editor	
1947 (for one year)	Riyasat Ali Nadvi	Editor	
1949 – December 1974	Moinuddin Ahmad Nadvi	Editor-in-chief	
January 1975 – September 1979	Abdul Salam Qidwai Nadvi and Sabahuddin Abdur Rahman Nadvi	Co-editors	
October 1979 – November 1987	Sabahuddin Abdur Rahman Nadvi	Editor-in-chief	
December 1987 – February 2008	Ziauddin Islahi	Editor-in-chief	
March 2008 – October 2021	Ishtiyaq Ahmad Zilli and Umair al-Siddiq Nadvi	Co-editors	
November 2021 – March 2022	Zafarul Islam Khan and Umair al-Siddiq Nadvi	Co-editors	
April 2022	Zafarul Islam Khan, Umair al-Siddiq Nadvi, and Kaleem Sifaat Islahi	Co-editors	
May 2022 – February 2023	Zafarul Islam Khan and Umair al-Siddiq Nadvi	Co-editors	
March 2023 – present	Zafarul Islam Khan, Umair al-Siddiq Nadvi, and Kaleem Sifaat Islahi	Co-editors	

== Sources ==
- Moosa, Mohmmad (2022). Urdu Sahafat Mein Ulama Ke Khidmaat 1800 AD To 1960 AD (PhD thesis) (in Urdu). India: Department of Urdu, Panjab University. p. 185–188. hdl:10603/471669. Archived from the original on 18 December 2023.
- Anjum, Suhail (2017). Deeni Rasail Ki Sahafati Khidmat (in Urdu). New Delhi: Institute Of Objective Studies. pp. 144–148.
- Jilani, Atiq Ahmad. Risala "Ma'arif" ki Urdu Adabi Khidmat: Ek Tehqiqi o Tanqidi Jaiza.
- Parveen, Naghma (2016). Seerat Nigari mein Darul Hosannafeen Azamgarh ki Kidmat Ek Tehqiqi Jaiyza (PhD thesis) (in Urdu). India: Department of Sunni Theology, Aligarh Muslim University. pp. 30–34. Archived from the original on 8 May 2019.
- Nizamuddin (2015). Darulmusannyafin Shiblee Ekademy Ka Aitihasik Addhyayan 1914 Se 1947 (PhD thesis) (in Hindi). India: Department of History, Veer Bahadur Singh Purvanchal University. pp. 131–171. Archived from the original on 24 September 2025.
- Roquiya, Zainab (2014). Darul Musannefin Ki Adbi Tasaneef Ka Tahqiqi Wa Tanqidi Jaiza (PhD thesis) (in Urdu). India: Department of Urdu, Aligarh Muslim University. pp. 559–650. Archived from the original on 14 December 2016.
- Uddin, Shabab (2008). Daar-ul-musannifeen Ki Adabi Khidmat Ka Taaruf (in Urdu). India: Aseelah Offset Printer. pp. 146–213.
- Al-Azami, Mohammad Ilyas (2002). Darul Musannefeen Ki Tarikhi Khidmat (in Urdu). Patna: Khuda Bakhsh Library. p. 262.
- Nomani, Khursheed (1977). Darul Musannefin Azamgarh Ki Adbi Khidmat (in Urdu). India: University of Mumbai; Maharashtra Urdu Academy. pp. 290–329.
- Taaruf Daar-ul-musannifeen Shibli Academy (in Urdu). pp. 24–25.
- Baharul Islam, Mohammad (2017). Contribution of Syed Suliman Nadvi on Urdu Literature (in Bengali). Bangladesh: University of Dhaka. p. 185.
- Imran, Atif (2020). Contribution of Syed Sulaiman Nadvi to Ismail studies. India: Department of Islamic Studies, Aligarh Muslim University. p. 22.
- Al-Azami, Mohammad Ilyas (2001). Allama Syed Suleman Nadvi: Bahaisiyat Moarrikh (in Urdu). Patna: Khuda Bakhsh Library. p. 246.
- Hashim, Syed Mohammad (1995). Syed Sulaiman Nadvi : Hayat Aur Adabi Karname (in Urdu). India: Department of Urdu, Aligarh Muslim University. pp. 325–352.
- Siddiqi, Mohammad Naeem (1985). Allama Syed Sulaiman Nadvi: Shakhsiyat Wa Adabi Khidmaat (in Urdu). India: Maktaba-e-Firdaus Lucknow. pp. 364–395. OCLC 1082203243.
- Nadwi, Moinuddin Ahmad (1973). Hayat-e-Sulaiman (in Urdu). Azamgarh: Maarif Press. pp. 105, 592. ISBN 9789380104386. OCLC 846490920.
- Abdullah, Shaikh (1989). Syed Sulaiman Nadvi life and works (PhD thesis) (in Urdu). India: Anjuman-I-Islam Urdu Research Institute Bombay, University of Mumbai. pp. 469–485.
