= Ishtiyaq Ahmad Zilli =

Historian, Islamic, Quranic scholar and retired professor

- Born: 2 May 1942 (age 83); Chhaun, Azamgarh, Uttar Pradesh, India
- Occupation(s): Historian, Professor, Quranic Scholar, Islamic Scholar

Prof. Ishtiyaq Ahmad Zilli (born 2 May 1942) is a historian, Islamic, Quranic scholar and professor (retired) at Aligarh Muslim University, Aligarh, India. He is director/secretary of Darul Musannefin Shibli Academy, Azamgarh, India since 2008 and president of Idarah Ulumul Quran (www.alquran.in) Aligarh, India since 1984. His latest book is Tarikh-I-Firoz Shahi. His previous book was The Mughal State and Culture 1556-1598: Selected Letters and Documents from Munshaat Namakin. He is an alumnus of Madrasatul Islah (Saraimir), Madina University, Lucknow University and Aligarh Muslim University, from where he did his MA, M.Phil. and PhD in history. He retired as a professor of history, Centre of Advanced Study, Aligarh Muslim University. He was editor of Ma'arif for more than 10 years. Maarif is longest publishing Urdu monthly published continuously since July 1916 (www.shibliacademy.org).
