= Abdul Qavi Desnavi =

Indian writer, critic, bibliographer, and linguist (1930–2011)

- Born: 1 November 1930; Desna, Bihar, British India
- Died: 7 July 2011 (aged 80); Bhopal, India
- Occupations: Professor, writer, critic, linguist

Abdul Qavi Desnavi (1 November 1930 – 7 July 2011) was an Indian Urdu language writer, critic, bibliographer and linguist. He wrote many books on Urdu literature. His works included about Maulana Abul Kalam Azad, Mirza Ghalib and Allama Muhammad Iqbal. He was awarded with several awards for his literary works.

== Early life ==
Desnavi was born in village Desna of block Asthawan in Nalanda district Bihar. to the family of Muslim scholar Sulaiman Nadvi, who claimed to be descended from and who was a recognized historian and biographer of Muhammad. Desnavi was the son of Syed Mohammed Saeed Raza, who was Professor of Urdu, Arabic and Persian languages in St. Xavier's College, Mumbai. Desnavi had two brothers, elder Prof. Syed Mohi Raza and younger Syed Abdul Wali Desnavi.

Many scholars, poets, and teachers of today were his students in Bhopal, and several other students obtained PhD degree under his guidance. He died on 7 July 2011 in Bhopal, India.

== Career ==
Desnavi got his primary education in Arrah town of Bihar state. He completed his Graduation and Post Graduation in First from St. Xavier's College, Mumbai. He joined Urdu department in Saifia Post Graduate College in February 1961. He became Professor and Head of the Urdu department of Saifia College. He held various positions, such as:

- Additional Principal of Saifia Post Graduate College, Bhopal.(1983–1985).
- Secretary of Madhya Pradesh Urdu Academy, Bhopal, (1991–92).
- Elected Member Majlis E Aam Anjuman Taraqqui Urdu (Hind), New Delhi (1979–1984).
- Member of All India Anjuman Taraqui Urdu Board, New Delhi, (1977–1978).
- Member of Program Advisory Committee, All India Radio, Bhopal (1978–1979).
- Member Executive Council, Barkatullah University Bhopal, (1980–1982).
- Chairman of Board of Studies, Urdu, Persian & Arabic, Barkatullah University Bhopal, (1977–1980) and (1984–1985).
- Dean Faculty of Arts, Barkatullah University Bhopal, (1980–1982).
- Member Working Committee, Taj-ul-Masajid, Bhopal (1997–2007)

He has over 50 books under his name, some of which are:

1. Bhopal aur Ghalib
2. Motala-E-Khotoot Ghalib
3. Talesh-E_Azad
4. Ek Shahar Panch Mashahirs
5. Hayat-e-Abul Kalam Azad

== Bibliography ==
- Allama Iqbal Bhopal Mein, publisher, Dept. of Urdu Saifia College, Bhopal (1967)
- Bhopal Aur Ghalib, publisher, Dept. of Urdu Saifia College, Bhopal (1969)
- Nuskha-E-Bhopal Aur Nuskha-A-Bhopal Sani, publisher, Dept. of Urdu Saifia College, Bhopal (1970)
- Motala—E—Khotoot—E—Ghalib (1975) (2nd edition) (1979)
- Iqbal Uneesween Sadi Mein, publisher, Naseem Book Depot, (1977)
- Iqbal Aur Dilli, Publisher Nai Awaz Jamia Nagar New Delhi (1978)
- Iqbal Aur Darul Iqbal Bhopal, publisher, Naseem Book Depot, (1983)
- Iqbaliat Ki Talash, Makataba Jamia, (1984)
- Iqbaliat Ki Talash, publisher, Globe Publishers, Urdu Bazar Lahore, Pakistan (1985)
- Abul Kalam Azad Urdu, Publisher Sahitya Akademi (1987)
- Maulana Abul Kalam Mohiuddin Ahmad Azad Dehlavi (1988)
- Talash—E—Azad, publisher, Maharashtra Urdu Academy
- Hayat Abul Kalam Azad (2000), Publisher, Modern Publishing House New Delhi.

== Letter from eminent personalities ==
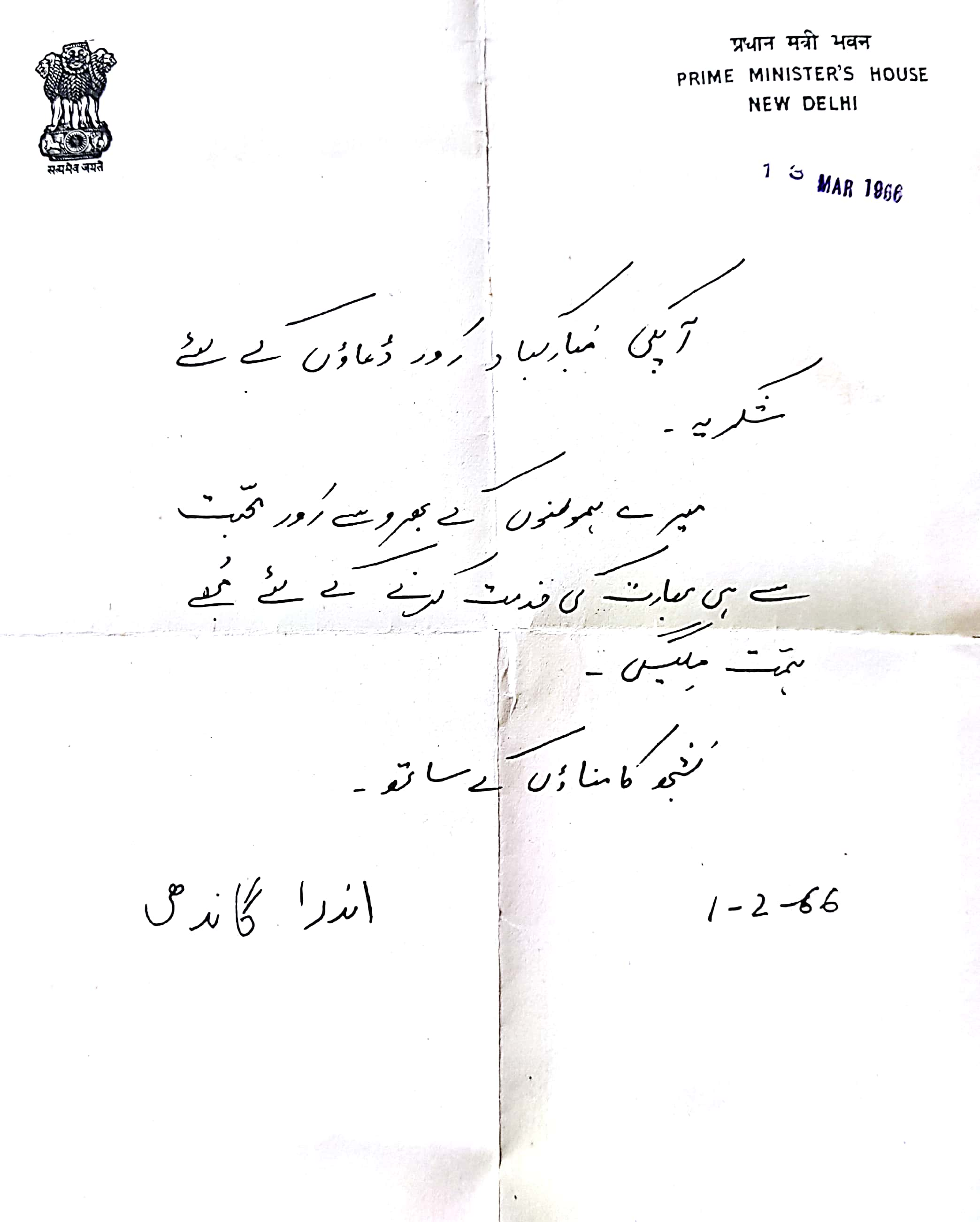
Letter sent by P.M Indira Gandhi to Prof. Abdul Qavi Desnavi

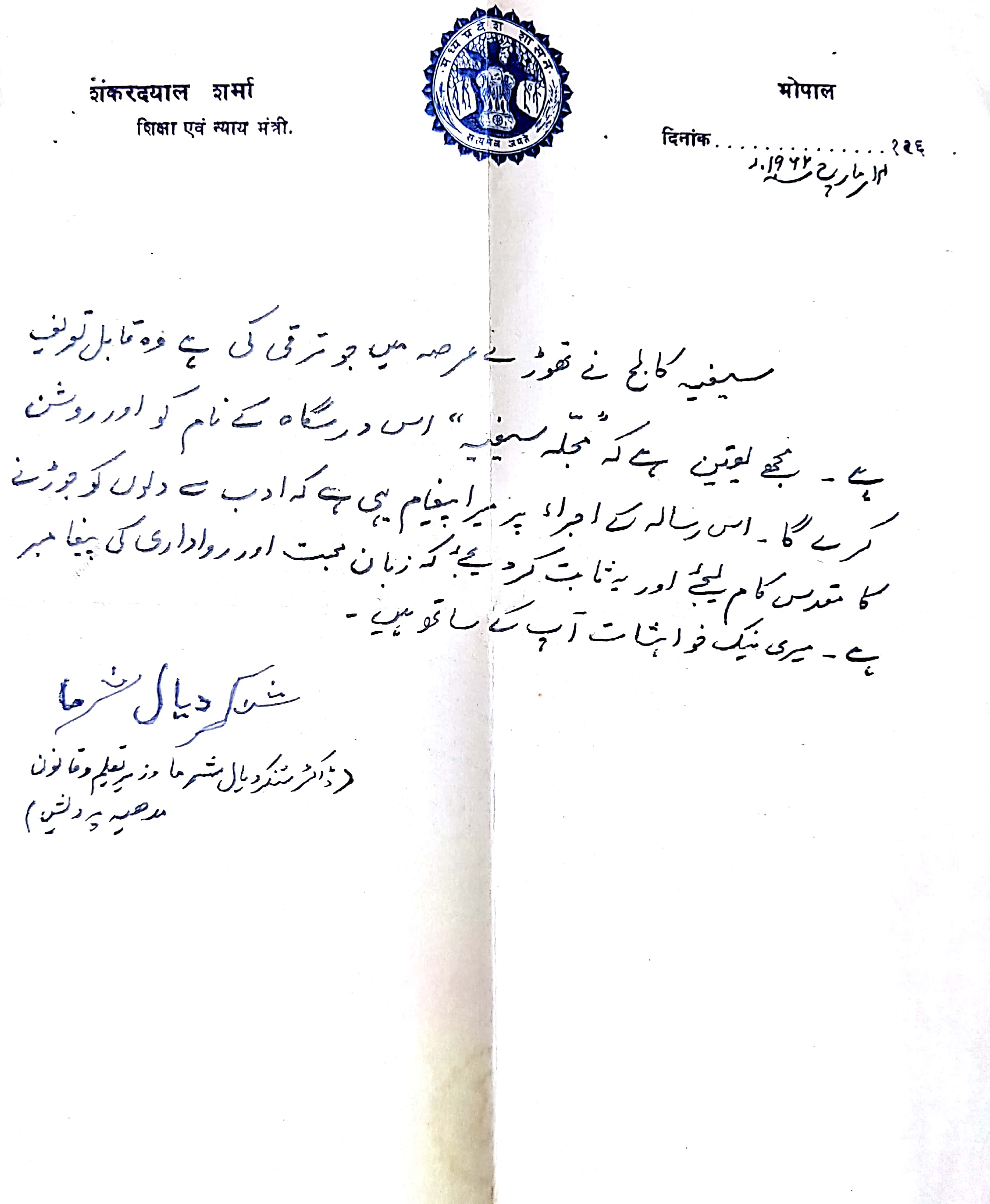
Letter by Dr. Shanker Dayal Sharma

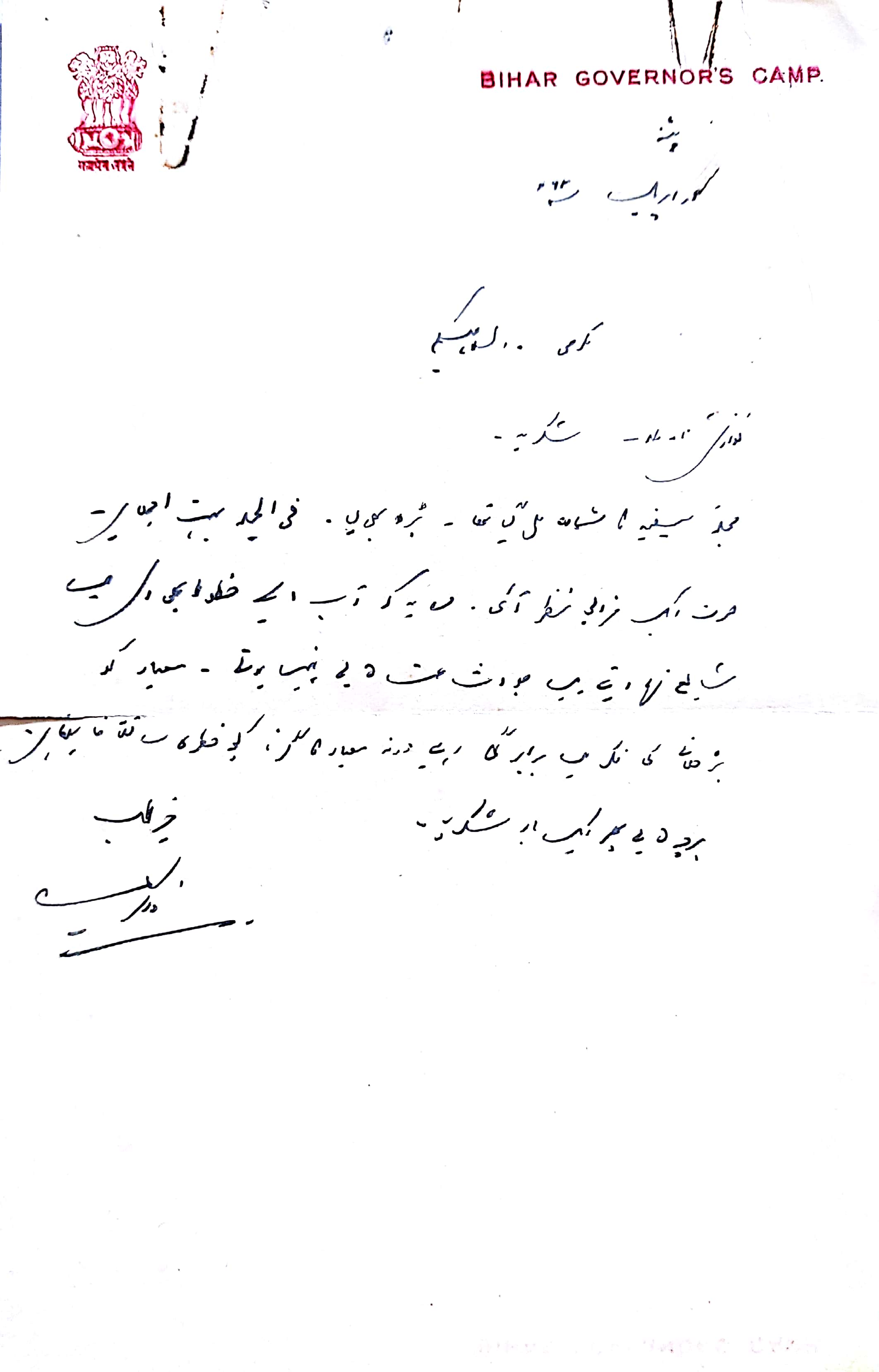
1962 Letter from the President of India Zakir Husain to Abdul Qavi Desnavi

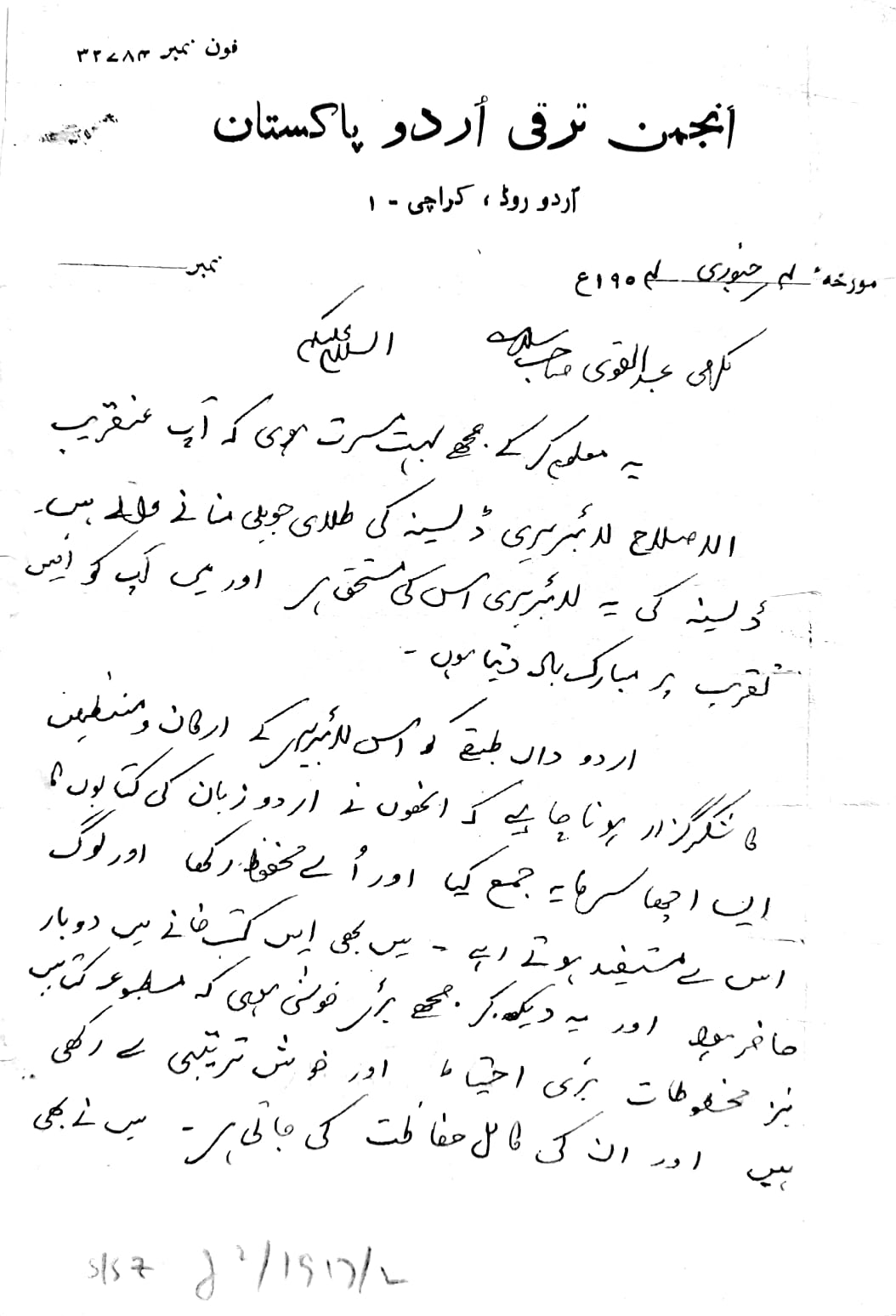
Letter from Moulvi Abdul Haq to Abdul Qavi Desnavi

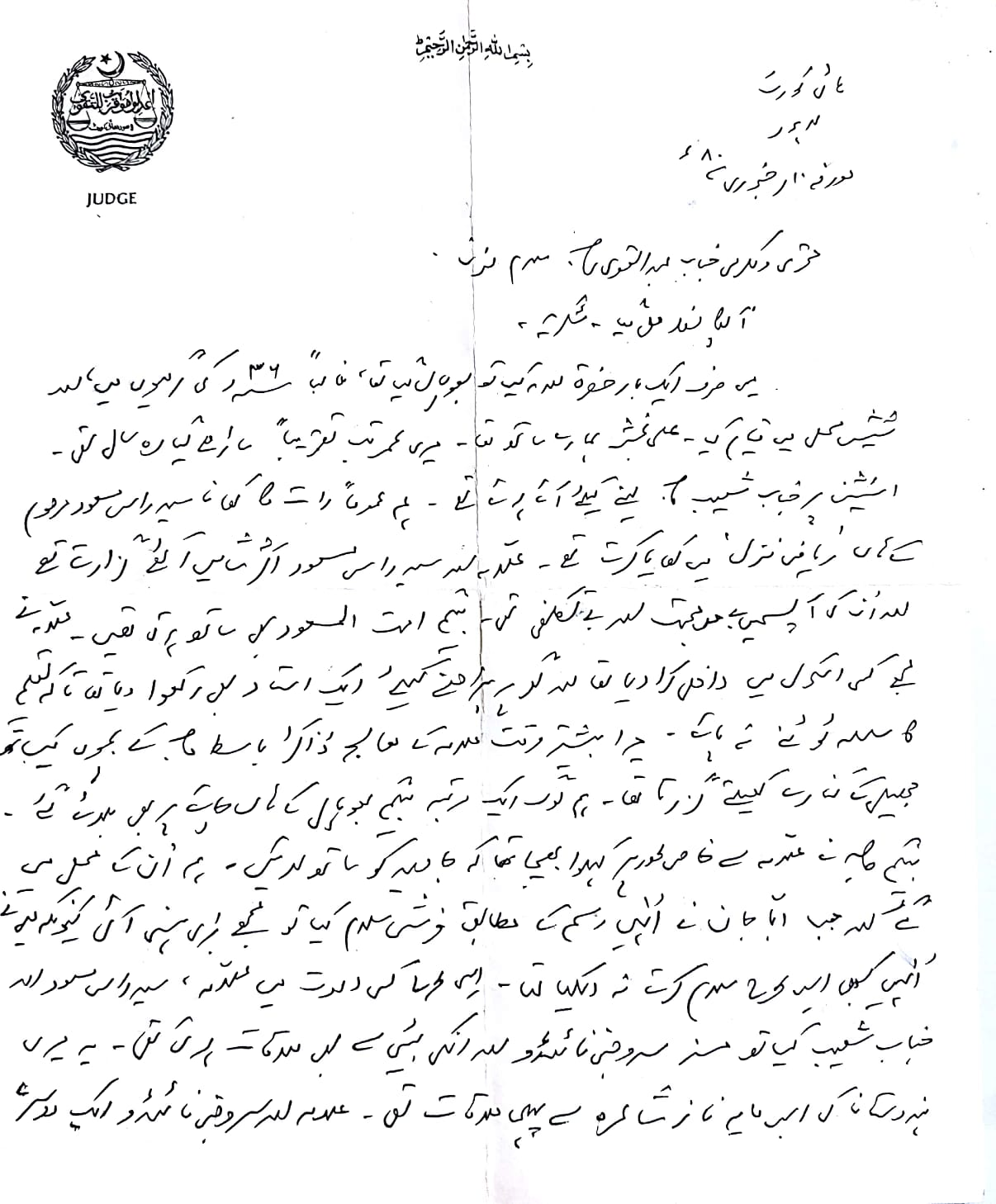
Letter from Senior Justice Javed Iqbal

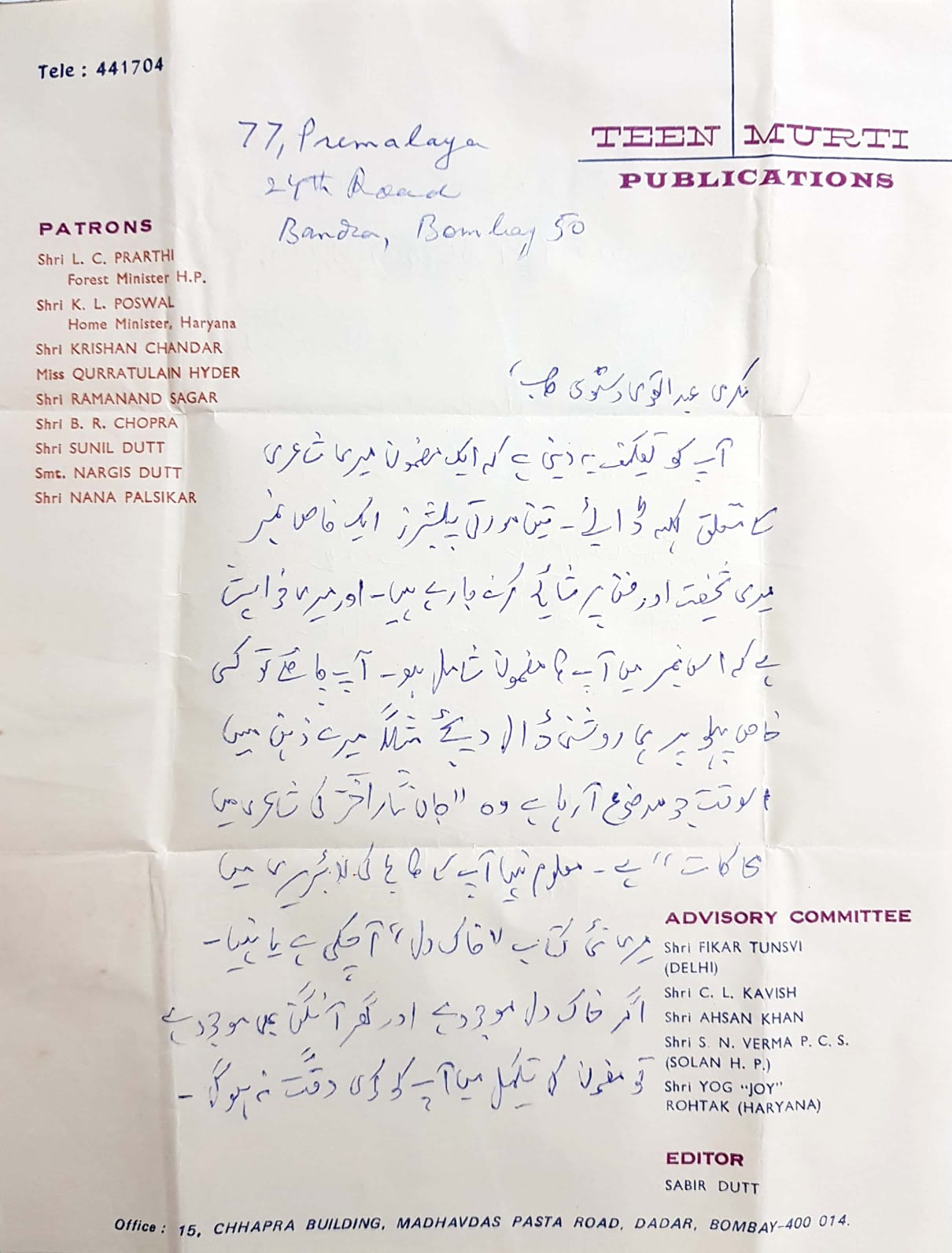
Letter from Jan Nisar Akhtar.

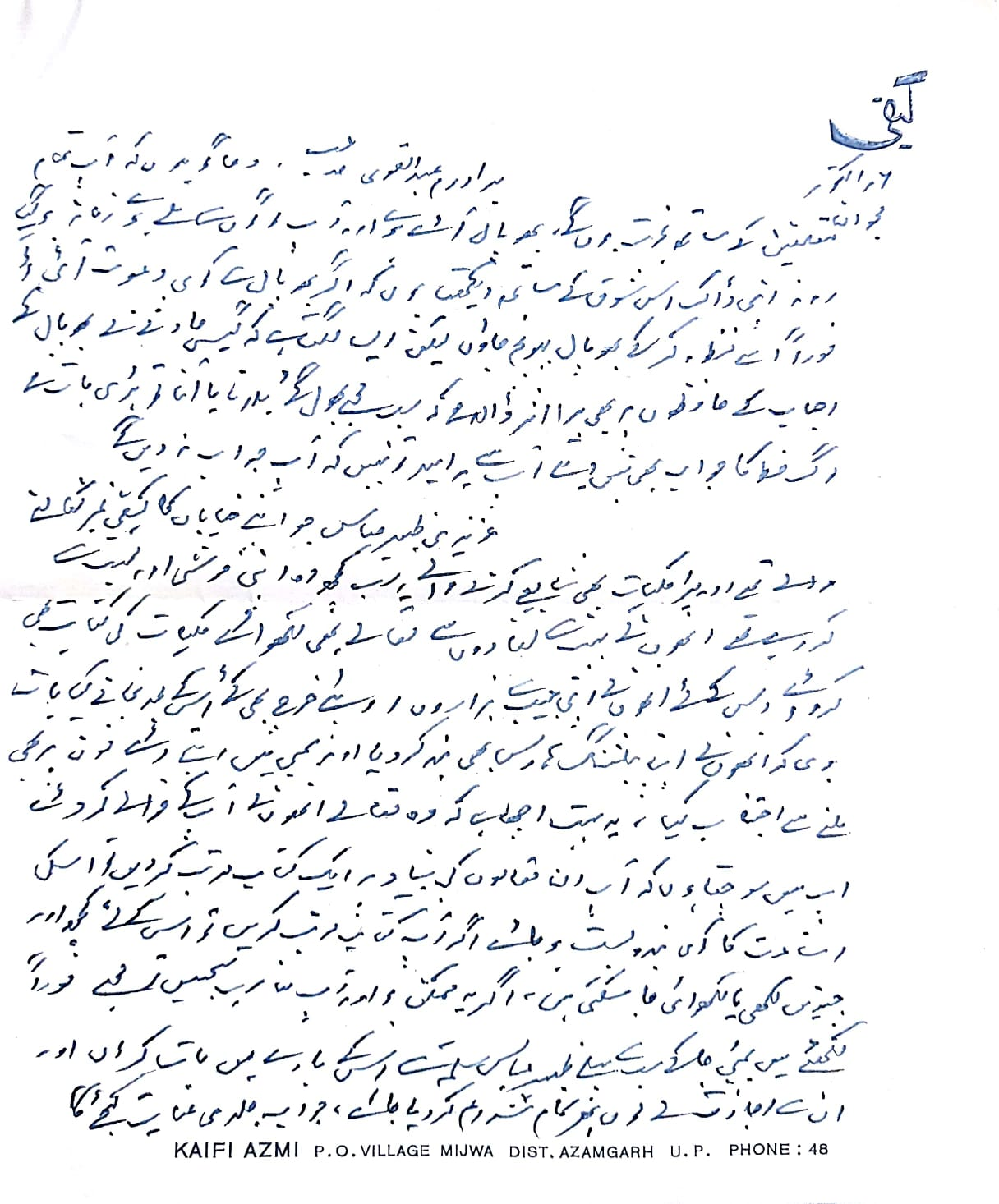
Letter from Kaifi Azmi to Abdul Qavi Desnavi

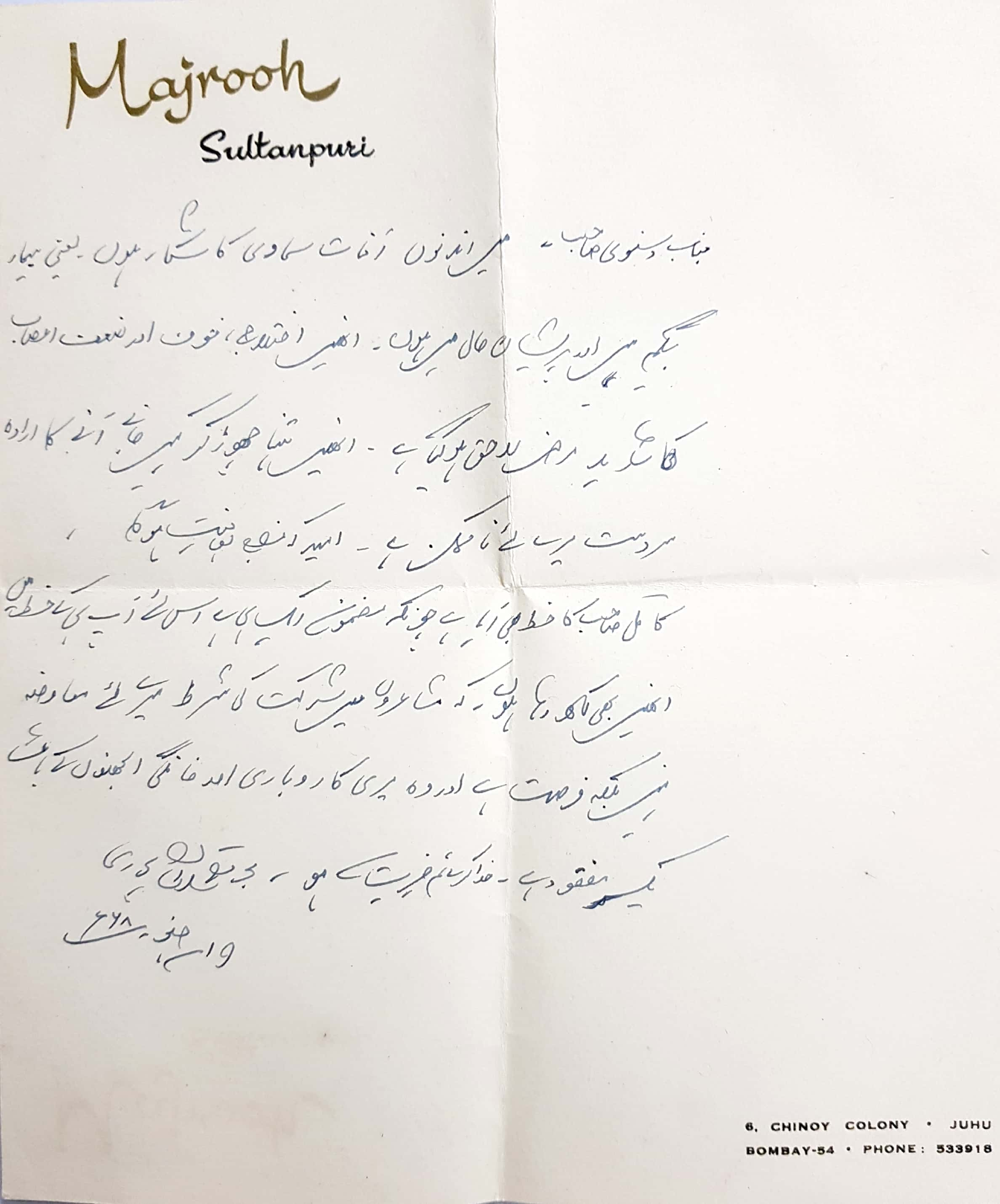
Letter from Majrooh Sultanpuri to Abdul Qavi Desnavi

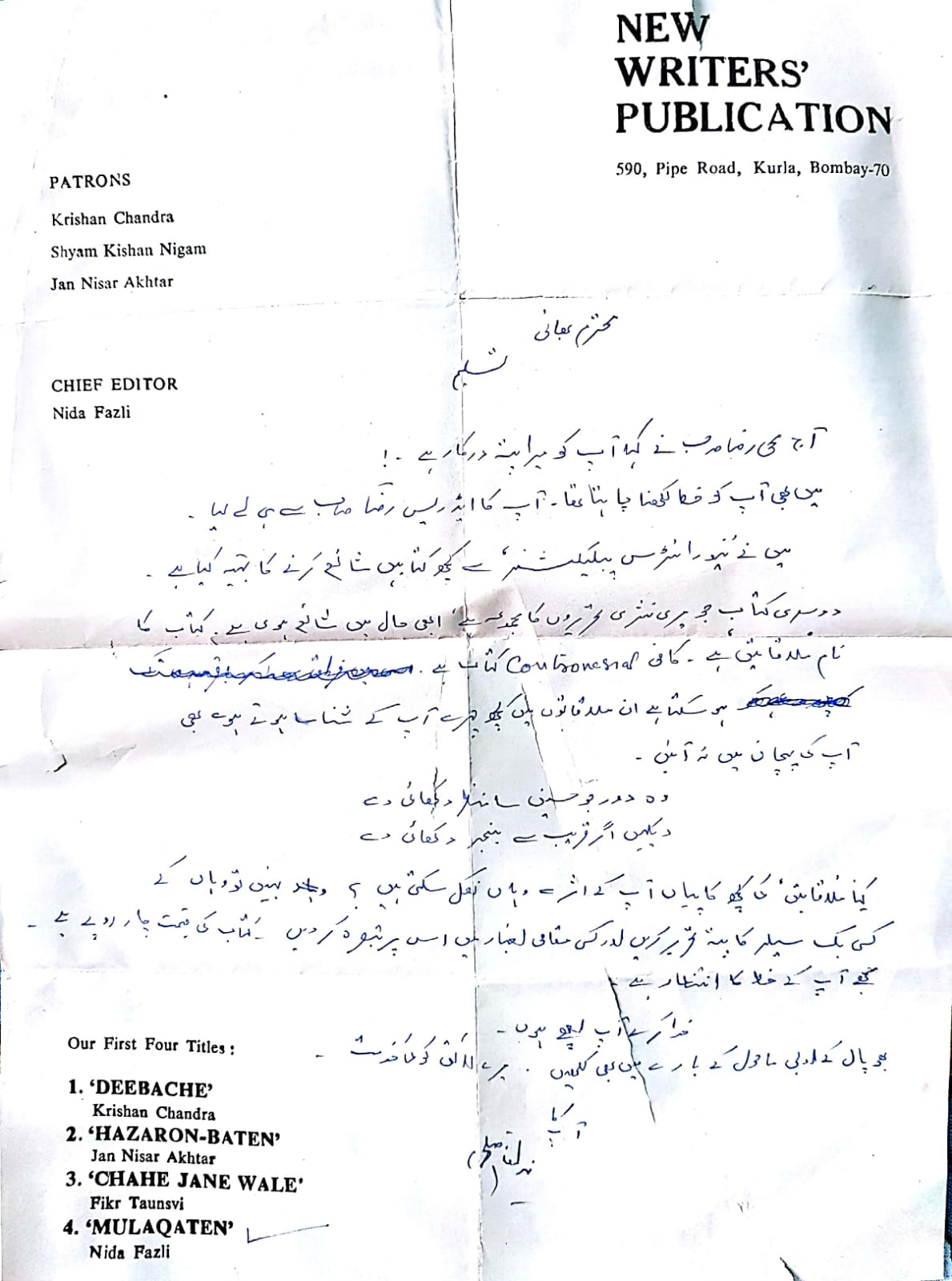
Letter from Nida Fazli to Abdul Qavi Desnavi

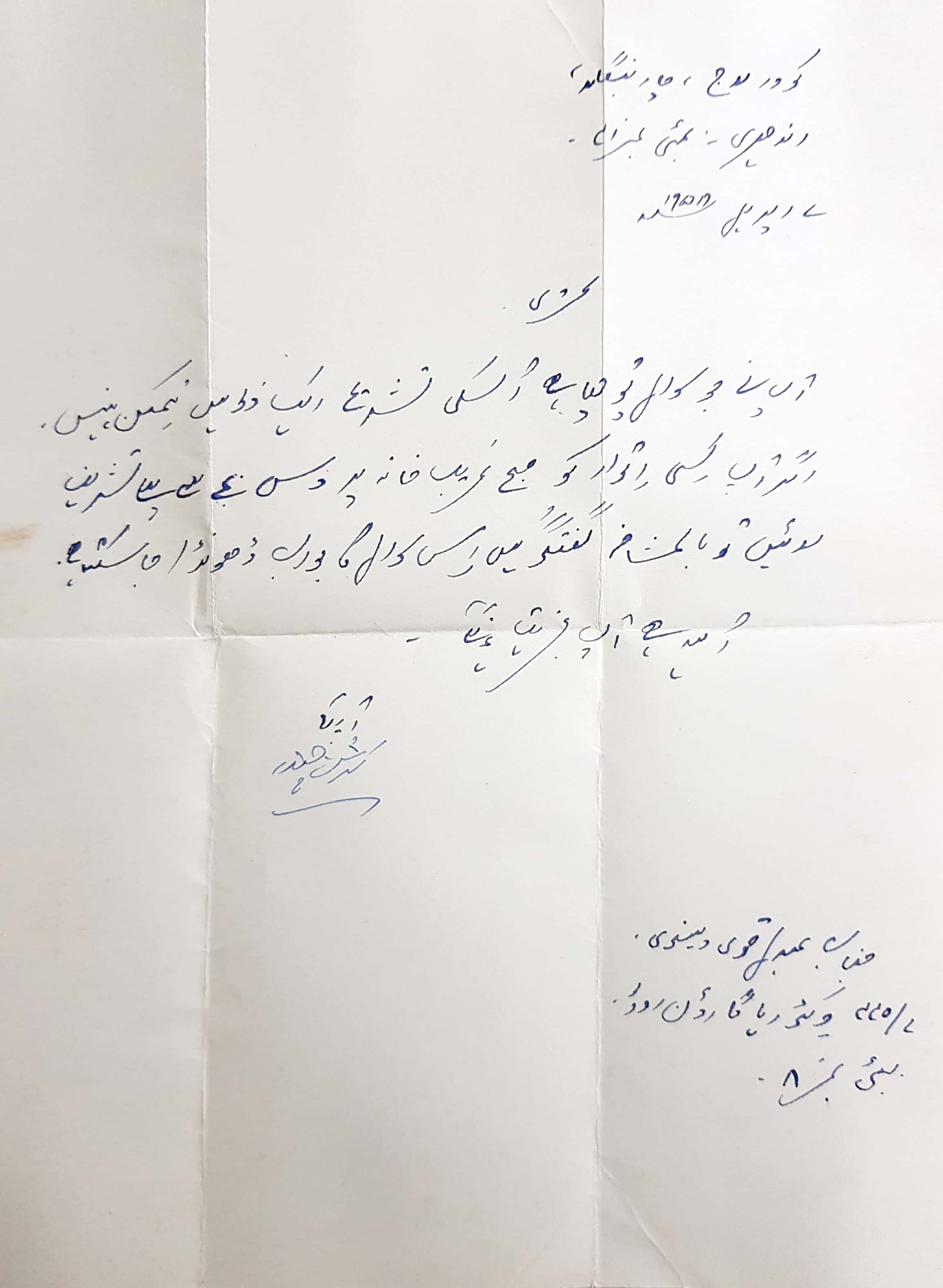
Letter sent to Prof. Abdul Qavi Desnavi from Krishan Chander

== Legacy ==
On 1 November 2017, Google showed a Google Doodle in honouring Desnavi's 87th birthday. Doodle depicts Abdul Qavi Desnavi at his work, the logo stylized in Urdu-style script. As the head of the Urdu Department at Bhopal’s Saifia College and a member of several regional and national literary bodies, he exerted a powerful influence on the evolution of Urdu literature and academic thought in India.

== See also ==
- List of Indian writers
- List of Urdu language writers
