= Bibliography of Shibli Nomani =

- Shibli Nomani (1857–1914)

This bibliography of Shibli Nomani is a selected list of generally available scholarly resources related to Shibli Nomani, a poet, philosopher, historian, educational thinker, author, orator, reformer, critic of orientalists and Islamic scholar from the Indian subcontinent during the British Raj, regarded as the father of Urdu historiography. His disciple Sulaiman Nadvi wrote his biography, Hayat-e-Shibli, in 1943. This list will include his biographies, theses written on him and articles published about him in various journals, newspapers, encyclopedias, seminars, websites, etcetera in APA style.

== Encyclopedias ==
- Abdullah, Mohammad (1982), Shorter Encyclopaedia of Islam (in Bengali) (5th ed.), Sherbangla Nagar, Dhaka: Islamic Foundation Bangladesh, pp. 383–384, ISBN 984-06-0252-7
- Ahmad, Anis & Özervarli, M.Sait (2010). "ŞİBLÎ NU'MÂNÎ". TDV Encyclopedia of Islam, Vol. 39 (Şeri̇f Paşa – Tanzanya) (in Turkish). Istanbul: Presidency of Religious Affairs, Centre for Islamic Studies. pp. 126–129. ISBN 978-975-389-632-0.
- Esposito, John L. (2003), "Shibli Numani, Muhammad", The Oxford Dictionary of Islam, Oxford University Press, doi:10.1093/acref/9780195125580.001.0001, ISBN 978-0-19-512558-0
- Zaman, Maheen (2018), "Shibli Numani", in Kassam, Zayn R.; Greenberg, Yudit Kornberg; Bagli, Jehan (eds.), Encyclopedia of Indian Religions: Islam, Judaism, and Zoroastrianism, Encyclopedia of Indian Religions, Dordrecht: Springer Netherlands, pp. 635–636, doi:10.1007/978-94-024-1267-3_877, ISBN 978-94-024-1267-3

== Biographies ==
- Abdurraḥmān, Ṣabāḥuddīn. (1985). Maulānā Shiblī Nuʻmānī par ek naẓar (in Urdu). Aʻẓamgaṛh: Dārulmuṣannifīn. OCLC 214967639.
- Ahmad, Furqan (2018). Towards the Renaissance : Shibli and Maulana Thanvi on Sharia. New Delhi: Indian Law Institute. ISBN 978-81-927926-3-7. OCLC 1081102909.
- Aḥmad, Maftūn (1986). Maulānā Shiblī Nuʻmānī: ek mut̤ālaʻah (in Urdu). Karācī: Maktabah-yi Uslūb. OCLC 20492948.
- Akhtar Rahi (1981). Kitāb nāmah-yi Shibl (in Urdu). Lāhaur: Muslim Akaiḍmī.
- Al-Azami, Mohammad Ilyas (2012). Shibli Sukhanwaron Ki Nazar Mein (in Urdu). Adabi Daera, Azamgarh.
- Anṣārī, ʻAbdurraḥīm (1990). Shiblī Nuʻmānī ke maqālāt kā tanqīdī jāʾizah (in Urdu). Rahlah, Zilaʻ Pilāmūṉ: ʻAbdurraḥīm Anṣārī.
- Anṣārī. Muʻīnuddīn Aḥmad (1967). Shiblī makātib ki raushnī men (in Urdu). Urdū akeḍamī Sindh. OCLC 20715079.
- ʻArshī, Jamīlah (1996). Maulānā Shiblī kī shāʻirī kā tanqīdī mut̤ālaʻah (in Urdu). Jaipūr: Rājasthān Urdū Akādmī.
- As̲arī, Abū ʻAlī; Aʻẓamī, Arshad ʻAlī Anṣārī. (2002). ʻAllāmah Shiblī aur Maulānā Abūlkalām Āzād (in Urdu). Āʻẓamgaṛh: Qāsimī Pres. OCLC 756377247.
- ʻAz̤īm, Ak̲h̲tar Vaqār (1968). Shiblī baḥaisiyyat-i muʾarrikh (in Urdu). Lāhaur: Taṣnīfāt; milne kā patah:Urdū Markaz. OCLC 583382770.
- Aʻz̤amī, Muḥammad Ilyās (2013). Ās̲ār-i Shiblī (in Urdu). Majmaʻ Dār al-Muṣannifīn. Aʻz̤amgaṛh. ISBN 978-93-82201-03-8. OCLC 876368039.
- Aʻz̤amī, Muḥammad Ilyās (2018). Shiblī k̲h̲ūdnavishtaun̲ men̲ (in Urdu). Aʻz̤amgaṛh. ISBN 978-81-938821-0-8. OCLC 1135913928.
- Badāyūnī, Shams (2014). Shiblī aur Āzād : (marāsim o taʻlluq kā avvalīn daur) (in Urdu). Naʼī Dihlī. ISBN 978-93-83239-11-5. OCLC 1154008782.
- Bhajiwalla, Rustom Pestonji; Modi, Jivanji Jamshedji; Shiblī Nuʻmānī (1932). Mauláná Shibli & Ûmar Khayyám (in Urdu). Surat, The: I. P. i.e. Irish Presbyterian mission press. OCLC 7223174.
- Bhaṭṭī, ʻAbduljalīl. (1989). Shiblī kā naẓariyah-yi tārīḵẖ: ek jāʾizah: sīrat, savāniḥ, tārīḵẖ, tahẕīb, jadaliyyāt (in Urdu). Bahāvalpūr : Lāhaur: Taurīḵẖ; Isṭākisṭ, ʻIlmī Kutubḵẖānah. OCLC 614906965.
- Bī, Ṣafīyah (2000). ʻAllāmah Shiblī Nuʻmānī baḥais̲iyat savāniḥ nigār (in Urdu). Cīnnāʼī: Je. Em. Prāsis. OCLC 694080524.
- Cug̲h̲tāʼī, Muḥammad Ikrām (2017). Shibli Numani : life and works. Lahore: Pakistan Writers' Co-operative Society. ISBN 978-969-8460-59-4. OCLC 1001251239.
- Dasnavī, Sayyid Shahābuddīn. (1987). Shiblī, muʻānidānah tanqīd kī raushnī me. Silsilah-yi mat̤būʻāt-i Anjuman Taraqqī-yi Urdū, Hind; 522 (in Urdu). Naʾī Dihlī: Anjuman Taraqqī-yi Urdū, Hind. OCLC 21196770.
- Devā, Muḥammad Fārūq. (1999). Sar Sayyid aur Shiblī: taʻlīmī aur samājī ḵẖidmāt kā taqābulī mut̤ālaʻah (in Urdu). Srīnagar: Gulshan Pablisharz.
- Farḥat Iḥsās, Ak̲h̲tarulvāsi (2009). Shiblī Nuʻmānī : māz̤ī āgāh, mustaqbil nigāh (in Urdu). Naʼī Dihlī: al-Balāg̲h̲ Pablīkeshanz. OCLC 467929962.
- Farruk̲h̲ī, Aslam (2011). Maulānā Shiblī Nuʻmānī (in Urdu). Naʼī Dihlī: Maktabah-yi Jāmiʻah. OCLC 789643011.
- G̲h̲āsiq, Mut̤īʻurraḥmán (2012). ʻAllāmah Shiblī Nuʻmānī : shak̲h̲ṣiyat aur shāʻirī (in Urdu). Alīgaṛh: Maʼū Nāth Bhanjan. OCLC 843124293.
- Hāshmī, Sayyid Sak̲h̲ī Aḥmad (1997). Shiblī kā zahnī irtiqā': taḥqiqī maqālah (in Urdu). Karācī: Majlis Yādgār Hāshmī.
- Ḥifnāwī, Jalāl al-Saʻīd. (1998). Fann al-sīrah fī al-adab al-Urdī ʻinda Shiblī al-Nuʻmān. 880-05Dirāsāt fī al-adab al-Urdī; 1 (in Urdu). al-Qāhirah: Dār al-Nashr lil-Jāmiʻāt. ISBN 978-977-5526-96-0.
- Ikram, S. M. (1966). Shiblī nāmah, Ek fann kār kī dāstān ḥayāt (in Urdu). Lakhnʻau: Maktabah-yi urdū. OCLC 20398005.
- Ikram, S. M. (1971). Yādgār-i Shiblī (in Urdu). Lāhaur: Adarah-yi S̲aqāfat Islāmiah. OCLC 19912650.
- Islahi, Kaleem Sefat (2014). ʻIrfān-i Shiblī (in Urdu). Aʻz̤amgaṛh. OCLC 945401656.
- K̲h̲alīq Anjum; Anjuman Taraqqī-yi Urdū (Hind) (1996). Shiblī kī ʻilmī va adabī ḵẖidmāt. 880-03Silsilah-yi mat̤būʻāt-i Anjuman Taraqqī-yi Urdū, Hind; 1459 (in Urdu). Naʾī Dihlī: Anjuman Taraqqī-yi Urdū, Hind. ISBN 978-81-7160-080-9.
- Khan, Javed Ali (2014). Muhammad Shibli Nomani : life and contributions. Azamgarh (U.P.). ISBN 978-93-82201-40-3. OCLC 1159642160.
- K̲h̲ān̲, Alāʼuddīn (2017). Bayād-i Shiblī (in Urdu). Naʼī Dihlī: Institute of Objective Studies. ISBN 978-93-84973-12-4. OCLC 1010712713.
- Khān, ʻUbaidullāh. (1961). Maqālāt yom-i Shiblī (in Urdu).
- Murad, Mehr Afroz (1976). Intellectual modernism of Shibli Nuʾmani: an exposition of his religious and socio-political ideas. Lahore: Institute of Islamic Culture. ISBN 81-7151-216-X. OCLC 42892790.
- Nadīm, K̲h̲ālid (2014). Shiblī kī āp bītī (in Urdu). Lāhaur: Nashriyāt. OCLC 899138071.
- Nadwi, Azmatullah (2015). Shaikh Shibli Nomani: His Contribution to The Production of Arabic Language and Its Culture (in Arabic). ISBN 978-9383322848.
- Nadvi, Syed Sulaiman; Quraishī, ʻAbdurrazzāq. (1965). Khulāṣah-yi ḥayāt-i Shiblī (in Urdu).
- Nadvi, Syed Sulaiman (1970). Ḥayāt Shibli. Silsilah-yi Dārul Muṣannifīn66 (in Urdu). ʻĀzam Gaṛh: Dar Mat̤baʻ Muʾārif, Dārul Muṣannifīn T̤abaʻ Gardīd. OCLC 37282205.
- Nadwī, Muḥammad Akram (2001). Shiblī al-Nuʻmānī: ʻallāmat al-Hind al-adīb wa-al-muʾarrikh al-nāqid al-arīb. 880-05Aʻlam al-Muslimīn; 83 (in Urdu). Dimashq: Dār al-Qalam. OCLC 756181303.
- Qādrī, Mushtāq (2015). Shiblī baḥais̲iyat-i sīrat nigār : al-Fārūq ke tanāz̤ir men̲ (in Urdu). Dihlī. ISBN 978-93-5073-486-5. OCLC 900314786.
- Ṣafīyah Bī (2000). Jahān-i Shiblī: taṣānīf kī raushnī me (in Urdu). Naʾī Dihlī: Taqsīmkār, Maktabah-yi Jāmiʻah.
- Saʻīd, Anṣārī (1934). Maulānā Shiblī, Urdū ke bihtarīn inshā pardāz (in Urdu). Lakhnaʼū, Uttar Pradesh: Al-Nāẓir Pres. OCLC 44756809.
- Shāh, Sayyid Iftik̲h̲ār Ḥusain (1977). Iqbāl aur pairavī-yi Shibl (in Urdu). Lāhaur: Sang-i Mīl Pablīkeshanz. OCLC 563116032.
- Shaukat, Saad (2016). Shibli Nomani's Contribution to Kalam. Graduate Theological Union. OCLC 1041123831.
- Shiblī Nuʻmānī; Ḥasnain, Sayyid Muḥammad; Āzād, Abūlkalām (1988). Ḵẖut̤ūt̤-i Shiblī banām Āzād: baqalam Shibl. Correspondence (in Urdu). Paṭnah: Bihār Urdū Akādmī.
- Shiblī Nuʻmānī; K̲h̲udā Bak̲h̲sh Oriyanṭal Pablik Lāʼibrerī (1995). G̲ẖazaliyāt-i Shibl. Shibli's ghazals (in Urdu). Patnah : Naʾī Dihlī: Kẖudā0 Bakẖsh Oriyantal Pablik Lāʾibrerī; TaqsīmKār Maktabah-yi Jāmiʻah.
- Shiblī Nuʻmānī; Nadvī, Sayyid Sulaimān (1916). Makātīb-i Shibli. Correspondence (in Urdu). Āʻẓamgaṛh: Dārulmuṣannifīn.
- Ṣiddīqī, Nāz. (1976). Shiblī naqqādoṉ kī naẓar me (in Urdu). Ḥaidarābād: Ilyās Ṭraiḍarz : Milne ke pate, Adabī Buk Ḍipū. OCLC 557436232.
- Ṣiddīqī, Āftāb Aḥmad (1957). Shiblī (in Urdu). Dhaka: Maktaba-e Arefin. OCLC 573988807.
- Ṣiddīqī, Ẓafar Aḥmad; Sahitya Akademi (1988). Shibl. Hindustānī adab ke miʻmār (in Urdu). Naʾī Dihlī: Sāhitiyah Akādmī. OCLC 18816366.
- Suhail, Iqbāl (2014). Sīrat-i Shiblī (in Urdu). Aʻz̤amgaṛh: Dārulmuṣannifīn Shiblī Akaiḍmī. OCLC 905801607.
- ʻUs̲mānī, Muḥammad Vāṣil; Shiblī Nuʻmānī (1982). Shiblī bilād-i Islāmiyyah me (in Urdu). Karachi: Khurshid Publishers. OCLC 1059575579.
- Yaum-i Shiblī (in Urdu). Bambaʼī: Anjuman Taraqqī Urdū. 1944. OCLC 1027166753.
- Zaidī, Mah Jabīn (2014). ʻAllāmah Shiblī Nuʻmānī : ṣadī ke āʼīne men̲ (in Urdu). Karācī. ISBN 978-969-9640-17-9. OCLC 945434600.
- Zubairī, Muḥammad Amīn (1946). Tabṣirah-yi ḥayāt-i Shiblī (in Urdu). Bhūpāl. OCLC 42974122.

== Theses ==
- Aboobacker, M.C (2014). Urdu Mein Sawaneh Nigari Hali Aur Shibli Ke Khusoosi Hawale Se (PhD) (in Urdu). India: Department of Urdu, Sri Venkateswara University. hdl:10603/106639.
- Ahrari, Mohd Jafar (1999). The renaissance of Urdu literature and Shibli : Urdu adab ki Nashat-e-Sania aur Shibli (PhD) (in Urdu). India: School of Language Literature and Culture Studies, Jawaharlal Nehru University. hdl:10603/16762.
- Ahmad, Md. Faiz (2017). Mazameen Shibli ka tanquidi motala (PhD) (in Urdu). India: Department of Urdu, Delhi University. hdl:10603/371903.
- Ahmad, Wakar (2023). Maqalaat e Shibli Ka Tanqidi Mutalea (PhD) (in Urdu). India: Department of Urdu, Aligarh Muslim University. hdl:10603/543845.
- Akbar, Shabnam (2007). Shibli nomani bahaisiyat shayr (PhD) (in Urdu). India: University of Lucknow, University of Lucknow. hdl:10603/599142.
- Akhtar, Md Jamil (1988). Maulana Shibli Noamani As A Biographer And Historian (PhD) (in Urdu). India: University Department of Urdu, Lalit Narayan Mithila University. hdl:10603/496281. Archived from the original on 21 September 2025.
- Akhtar, Shahnaz (1996). Hali aur shibli ke tanqeedi nazaryat ka taqabuli mutala (PhD) (in Urdu). India: Department of Urdu, Aligarh Muslim University. hdl:10603/57818.
- Alam, Aftab (2021). Biography of Shibli Nomani (with special reference to Al Farooq) (MA) (in Urdu). New Delhi: Indira Gandhi National Open University.
- Aziz, Shahid (2016). Comparative Study of Biographical Writings of Muhammad Hussain Haikal and Shibli Noumani (PhD) (in Urdu). India: School of Islamic Studies, Baba Ghulam Shah Badshah University. hdl:10603/294809.
- Bano, Parveen (2007). Hali Aur Shibli ke tanqeedi nazaryat ka taqaabli mutalaa (PhD) (in Urdu). India: Department of Urdu, Veer Bahadur Singh Purvanchal University. hdl:10603/179176.
- Fatima, Shaheen (2021). Talamiza E Shibli Ki Ilmi Khidmaat (PhD) (in Urdu). India: Department of Urdu, Jamia Millia Islamia. hdl:10603/376255.
- Gasman, Fejri (2012). Shibli Numanis contribution to revitalization of ilm al-kalam (MA). Malaysia: International Islamic University Malaysia. Archived from the original on 16 July 2022.
- Hai, Ammar Abdul (2017). Unneeswin wa beeswin sadi ke Hindustan mein muslim mufakkirin ka tasawwur e talim Sir Syed Ahmad Khan Mohd Qasim Nanautvi Shibli Nomani Abul Kalam Azad Manazir Ahsan Geelani Syed Abu al Ala Maududi Khwaja Ghulam Sayyedain ke Hawale se (PhD) (in Urdu). India: Department of Urdu, Jamia Millia Islamia. hdl:10603/313157.
- Haq, Sirajul (2021). Maqalat e Shibli ka adbi aur tanqeedi jaiza (PhD) (in Urdu). India: Department of Urdu, Delhi University. hdl:10603/439484.
- Haq, Taqwim ul (2011). Shibli Na'umani ki Seerat al-Nabi (Jild Awal aur Dauam) ka Usloobi Mutala (PhD) (in Urdu). Pakistan: Department of Urdu, University of Peshawar. Archived from the original on 24 October 2023.
- İmancı, Sena (2019). On dokuzuncu yüzyıl siyer yazıcılığında Hz. Muhammed algısı: Ahmed Cevdet Paşa ve Mevlânâ Şiblî örneği (PhD) (in Turkish). Turkey: Necmettin Erbakan University. Archived from the original on 18 October 2022.
- Khatoon, Aisha (2002). Urdu Tanqueed Nigari Ke Irteqa main Shibli Nomani Ka Hisaa (PhD) (in Urdu). India: Department of Arabic, Aligarh Muslim University. hdl:10603/385277.
- Khatoon, Shaista (2013). Allama Shibli ka kirdar Muslim khawatin ki talimi wa samaji taraqqi men (PhD) (in Urdu). India: Department of Urdu, Veer Bahadur Singh Purvanchal University. hdl:10603/128335.
- Mahmud, Minhaj Uddin (2016). Contribution of Allama Shibli Nu'mani to Urdu Literature (PDF) (PhD) (in Bengali). Bangladesh: University of Dhaka. Archived from the original (PDF) on 31 May 2023.
- Malik, Javeed Ahmad (2024). Urdu Sirah Writing in India A Study of Allamah Shibli Numani and Maulana Idris Kandhalwi (PhD) (in Urdu). India: Department of Islamic Studies, Islamic University of Science & Technology. hdl:10603/633416.
- Mehr Arroz, Murad (1973). Intellectual Modernism of Shibli Nu'mani: an Exposition of His Religious & Political Ideas (PhD). Canada: McGill University.
- Mushtaq, Nabeel (2020). A comparative review of academic and literary services of Hali and Shibli (research and criticism) (PhD) (in Urdu). Pakistan: University of the Punjab.
- Nusba, Parveen (2005). Muslim educational reforms in nineteenth century India: an analysis of Shibli Nu'mani's thought & practice (PhD). Malaysia: International Islamic University Malaysia.
- Nasir, Md (1986). Allama Shibli Nomani Ki Nasri Khidmat (PhD) (in Urdu). India: Department of Urdu, Babasaheb Bhimrao Ambedkar Bihar University. pp. 202–206. hdl:10603/648649. Archived from the original on 23 September 2025.
- Onbasi, Alparslan (2020). Shibli Nu'mani and modernism (MA). Malaysia: International Islamic University Malaysia. Archived from the original on 19 October 2022.
- Rahman, Mirza Hifzur (2017). Understanding Shibli Nomani A Realm of Conflict (PhD) (in Urdu). India: School of Language Literature and Culture Studies, Jawaharlal Nehru University. hdl:10603/469878. Archived from the original on 21 September 2025.
- Umer, Zaitun (1969). Maulana Shibla Numani : a study of Islamic modernism and romanticism in India, 1882–1914 (PhD thesis). England: University of Oxford. OCLC 45572730. Archived from the original on 29 May 2023.
- Yeaqub, Md (2019). Writings of Allama Shibli Nomani In Arabic edition and annotation (PhD) (in Arabic). India: Department of Arabic, Aligarh Muslim University. hdl:10603/355062.
- Zafar, Talat (2017). Shibli nomani bahaisiyat Sawaneh Nagar (PhD) (in Urdu). India: Department of Urdu, Veer Bahadur Singh Purvanchal University. hdl:10603/201138.
- Zahid Hussain, Mir (2019). Shibli Ki Tasaneef Mein Sawanehi Aur Tareekhi Anasir (PhD) (in Urdu). India: Department of Urdu, University of Kashmir. hdl:10603/310407.

== Journals ==
- Ahmed, Muneer (2017). "A Critical Analysis of Manlana Numani's Uniquenesses (Tafarrudat) in The Light of Sirat-Al-Nabi(PBUH)". Al Basirah (in Urdu). 6 (2): 21–35. ISSN 2520-7334.
- al-Azmi, Muhammad Ilyas (2025). "Some Academic and Educational Institutes and Libraries of India Based on Shiblī's Rare Writings". Fikro-o-nazar. 62 (3). doi:10.52541/fn.v62i3.7140 (inactive 29 September 2025). ISSN 2518-9948.
- Ali, Dr Sajjad; Anwar, Dr Muhammad (2021). "Sirat-un-Nabi by Shibli Numani a Critical Review". Hazaraislamicus (in Urdu). 10 (1): 99–108. ISSN 2410-8065.
- Ar-Rahman, Shafiq; Rasheed, Zukhraf; Akhtar, Sohail (2021). "Analytical Study of the Concept of the Historiography of Molana Shibli Nomani (A Historical Analysis)". Al-Aijaz Research Journal of Islamic Studies & Humanities. 5 (4): 37–43. doi:10.53575/e4.v5.04(21)37-43. ISSN 2707-1219.
- Begum, Sayeeda (2020). "Maulana Shibli's Historical Perspectives: A study of Al-Mamun and Imam Ghazali". Mukt Shabd Journal. 9 (6): 7661–7664. ISSN 2347-3150. Archived from the original on 15 October 2022.
- Begum, Sayeeda (2020). "Maulana Shibli's role in Aligarh movement, foundation of new educational center at Azamgarh". Mukt Shabd Journal. 9 (6): 7665–7669. ISSN 2347-3150. Archived from the original on 15 October 2022.
- Bhat, Samee-Ullah (2019). "The Importance Of Works Of Muhammad Shibli Nomani". Journal of Islamic Studies and Humanities. 3 (2): 169–180. doi:10.21580/jish.32.2921. ISSN 2527-838X. S2CID 198507796.
- Çi̇ftsüren, Arzu (2018). "Şi̇bli̇ Numani̇'ni̇n Seyahatnamesi̇nde Ii. Abdülhami̇d Ve Gazi̇ Osman Paşa". Doğu Araştırmaları (in Turkish) (18): 5–16. ISSN 1307-6256.
- Farooqui, Muhammad Hamza (2014). "Intellectual Concerns Shared by Shiblī and Sulemān Nadvī". Bunyad – A Journal of Urdu Studies. 5 (1): 211–248.
- Gasman, Fejri (15 June 2013). "Shibli Nuâ€™maniâ€™s Contribution to Revitalization of â€˜Ilm al-Kala > m". At-Ta'dib. 8 (1). doi:10.21111/at-tadib.v8i1.512. ISSN 2503-3514.
- Ghaffar, Abdul; Ditta, Allah (2021). "A Comparative Study of Shiblī' No'manī's "al-Farooq: and Ghulam Ahmad Pervaiz's "Shāhkār-e-Risālat"". Al-Qamar (in Urdu). 4 (2): 633–647. doi:10.53762/en397455. ISSN 2664-4398.
- Ghori, Muhammad Ali (2011). "Maulana Shibli Nomani's trends in response to suspicions of the orientalists : An Analysis". Al-Idah (in Urdu). 23 (2): 110–138. ISSN 2075-0307.
- Gupta, Ritesh (2019). "Muhammad Shibli Nomani (1857–1914); His Educational Thought's and Career" (PDF). International Journal of Applied Social Science. 6 (8): 2152–2160. doi:10.36537/IJASS/6.8/2152-2160 (inactive 11 July 2025). ISSN 2394-1405.
- Humzah, Ameer; Lakhvi, Muhammad Hammad (2022). "The Critical Study of the Urdu Historiography of Molana Shibli Nomani from Sub-Continent". Journal of Xi'an Shiyou University. 18 (10): 639–643.
- Hussaini, Fareed; Suleman, Shumaila (2024). "A Critical Study of Shibli Nomani's "Seerat-un-Nabi (PBUH)"". Makhz (Research Journal) (in Urdu). 5 (2): 59–72. doi:10.47205/makhz.2024(5-II)urdu-06 (inactive 24 September 2025). ISSN 2709-9644.
- Hussain, Mubashir; Owaisi, Dr Muhammad Arshad (2020). "Shibli Naumani's Milli Poetry". Khayaban (in Urdu). 42 (1): 1–14. ISSN 2073-3666.
- Hussain, Muhammad Mahboob (2021). "Maulana Shibli ki 'Sher al-Ajam': Tehqeeq ke Aaine mein". Matan (in Urdu). 2 (1).
- Ilyas al-Azmi, Muhammad (2025). "Some Academic and Educational Institutes and Libraries of India Based on Shiblī's Rare Writings". Fikr-o Nazar. 62 (3): 183–153. eISSN 2518-9948.
- Islam, Arshad (2005). "'Allāma Shiblī Nu'mānī (1857–1914): A Monumental Islamic Scholar" (PDF). Pakistan Journal of History & Culture. 26 (1): 59–82. ISSN 1012-7682.
- Islam, Arshad (2013). "Allama Shibli and the early Muslim League: A dissenting voice". Intellectual Discourse. 21 (2): 197–219. ISSN 2289-5639.
- Islam, Arshad (2019). "Indian Muslims' Support for Ottoman Pan-Islamism: The Case of Shibli Nu'mani". Intellectual Discourse. 27 (1): 197–220. ISSN 2289-5639.
- Islam, Muzaffar (1987). "Shibli : On Nationalism". Proceedings of the Indian History Congress. 48: 366–371. ISSN 2249-1937. JSTOR 44141710.
- Islam, Rashid (2024). "The Place and Position of Molana Shibli Nomani in Urdu Historiography". Makhz (Research Journal) (in Urdu). 5 (3): 675–680. doi:10.47205/makhz.2024(5-III)urdu-25. ISSN 2709-9644.
- Islam, Rashid; Ibn Hasan, Aziz (2021). "Maulana Shibli Naumani's correspondence (research and criticism)". Jahan-e-Tahqeeq (in Urdu). 4 (3): 270–277. ISSN 2709-7625.
- Khan, A N (1985). "Shibli Nomani (1857 to 1914) and his Contribution to Education". Journal of the Pakistan Historical Society. 33 (4): 259.
- khan, Israr Ahmad (2015). "Allamah Shibli's methods of authenticating Islamic historical facts". International Journal of Islamic Thoughts. 4 (1): 81–94. ISSN 2306-7012.
- Khan, Javed Ali (1990). "Shibli's Studies in Islamic History". Journal of the Pakistan Historical Society. 38 (2): 143–150.
- Khanum, Almas (2016). "Maulana Shibli Nomani ki Muhqiqana Kawishen". Tahqeeq Nama (in Urdu). 18 (1): 284–295.
- Kumar, Akriti (2017). "Shibli Nomani And The Making Of Nadwatul'l Ulum". Proceedings of the Indian History Congress. 78: 676–682. ISSN 2249-1937. JSTOR 26906140.
- MostafaviSabzehvari, Reza (2010). "The influence of Moulana on the world thinkers especially thinkers in the Subcontinent". The Journal of Epicliterature (in Persian). 1 (9): 161. ISSN 2322-5793.
- Nabeel, Dr Nabeel Ahmed (2016). "Discussions of Shibli Nomani civilization and culture (in the context of Shaar al-Ajam)". Imtezaaj (in Urdu). 6 (1): 166–219.
- Nadia, Dr; Liaquat, Dr Samreena; Naeem, Sharmeen (2022). "Religious Thoughts and Services of Allama Shibli Nomani". Al-Azhār (in Urdu). 8 (1): 21–31. doi:10.46896/alazhr.v8i01.316 (inactive 11 July 2025). ISSN 2519-6707.
- Parveen, Nusba (2011). "Relevance of Shiblī's educational philosophy". Intellectual Discourse. 19 (2). ISSN 2289-5639.
- Rahman, Muhammad Anisur; Ahmed, Saeed (2025). "Approach Of Sub Continental Theologians To Miracles". Advance Social Science Archive Journal (in Urdu). 3 (1): 722–729. ISSN 3006-2500.
- Rasool, Shahida; Afshan, Zeenat; Farooq Baig, Muhammad (2022). "Modern Intellectual Discussions and Allama Shibli Nomani". Zaban O Adab. 15 (1): 68–80. ISSN 2073-3674.
- Shafi, Iftikhar (2018). "Shibli, English, and the Step-Mother". Pakistan Perspectives. 23 (2). Rochester, NY. doi:10.2139/ssrn.3549171. SSRN 3549171.
- Shah, Mutahir; Irshad, Dr Saira; Bibi, Brakhna (2021). "Shibli Nomani's research style in Sirat-un-Nabi (PBUH)". Al-Duhaa (in Urdu). 2 (02): 274–281. doi:10.51665/al-duhaa.002.02.0131. ISSN 2710-0812. S2CID 246349758.
- Syed, Baqar Hassan (2018). "Kalām in a Post-Traditional World: Shiblī Nu'mānī's Construction of Authority in 'Ilmul-Kalām and al-Kalām". Pakistan Journal of Historical Studies. 3 (2): 43–79. doi:10.2979/pjhs.3.2.02. ISSN 2470-8518. S2CID 198006035.
- Tanveer, Muhammad (2020). "Letter Writing of Allama Shibli Nomani". Tasdiq (in Urdu). 2 (1): 59–74. doi:10.56276/tasdiq.v2i1.25. ISSN 2707-6229. S2CID 255682817.
- Yeaqub, Md (2018). "Analytical Study Of Allamah Shibli's Persian Poetry" (PDF). Global Journal for Research Analysis. 7 (10): 88–90. ISSN 2277-8160.
- Yeaqub, Md. (2019). "Talim al-Nisa fi Nazariyat al-Allama Shibli al-Numani al-Hindi". Sri Lankan Journal of Arabic and Islamic Studies. 2 (1): 101–114. ISSN 2550-3014.
- Younus, Muhammad; Ain, Ayesha Qurrat ul (2024). "Early Muslim Encounters with Darwinian Theory of Evolution in South Asia: A Study of Shibli Nomani's Response". Mankind Quarterly. 64 (4): 623–638. doi:10.46469/mq.2024.64.4.3. ISSN 0893-4649.

== Newspapers ==
- Al-Hafiz, Musa (24 May 2021). "Shibli Nomani and his reform". Daily Naya Diganta (in Bengali).
- Dehlvi, Ghulam Rasool (18 May 2016). "Recalling Maulana Shibli Nomani and His Religious Ideas Inspired By Ilm ul Kalam". New Age Islam. Archived from the original on 18 October 2022.
- Rabiul Haque, Muhammad (4 August 2020). "Historical contribution of Allama Shibli Nomani in religious education reform". Jugantor (in Bengali).
- Siddiqui, Maleeha Hamid (28 December 2014). "Hali and Shibli rescued Urdu poetry". Dawn.
- Ubaidullah, Munshi Muhammad (7 October 2025). "Modern education in the thoughts of Allama Shibli Nomani". Prothom Alo. Archived from the original on 8 October 2025.
- "Versatile Scholar Shibli Nomani remembered today". Associated Press of Pakistan. 18 November 2019.

== Seminars ==
- "The First Teacher Of Modern Times, Allama Shibli Nomani: Sensitive Thinker, Thoughts And Reforms". Institute of Objective Studies and the Faculty of Theology, Aligarh Muslim University. 23 October 2021. Archived from the original on 17 October 2022.

== Websites ==
- Dariyabadi, Abdul Majid. "Maulana Shibli Nommi". Aligarh Movement. Archived from the original on 26 April 2021.
- Habibullah, K. M. (10 April 2024). "Allama Shibli Nomani: The Amazing Magician of Urdu Literature". Jogajog.
- Engineer, Asghar Ali (2009). "Shibli Nu'mani And National Politics". INSAF Bulletin. International South Asia Forum.
- Islam, Zafarul. "Educational Ideas of Allama Shibli and Their Relevance to Modern Period". Aligarh Movement. Archived from the original on 29 April 2021.
- Islahi, Zafrul Islam. "Maulana Shibli Nomani aur Aligarh". Aligarh Movement (in Urdu). Archived from the original on 27 April 2021.
- Islahi, Zafarul Islam. "Allama Shibli Nomani ka Dars-e-Quran aur Maulana Mohd Ali Jauhar". Aligarh Movement. Archived from the original on 26 April 2021.
- Kawaja, Kaleem. "Have We forgotten Shibli Nomani?". Aligarh Movement. Archived from the original on 27 April 2021.
- Kawaja, Kaleem. "A Rememberance[sic] on Shibli Nomani's 156th birth anniversary". Aligarh Movement. Archived from the original on 28 April 2021.
- Khan, Javed Ali. "Muslim Education, Shibli Nomani and Nadvatul Ulama, Lucknow". Aligarh Movement. Archived from the original on 17 October 2022.
- Rehman, Fahmidur (14 October 2022). "Mohammad Shibli Numani". Rowyak.
- Usmani, Afzal. "Allama Muhammad Shibli Nomani". Aligarh Movement. Archived from the original on 28 April 2021.
- Usmani, Afzal. "Unearthed after a century: Shibli Nomani's proposal for Islamic University". Aligarh Movement. Archived from the original on 28 April 2021.
- Usmani, Afzal. "Darul Musannefin Shibli Academy & Allama Shibli Nomani". Aligarh Movement. Archived from the original on 27 April 2021.
- Usmani, Afzal. "Allama Shibli Nomani & Prof. Thomas W. Arnold". Aligarh Movement. Archived from the original on 27 April 2021.
- Usmani, Afzal. "Allama Shibli Nomani and Nadwatul Uloom". Aligarh Movement. Archived from the original on 27 April 2021.
- Usmani, Afzal. "Allama Shibli Nomani and Madarsa-Tul-Islah". Aligarh Movement. Archived from the original on 28 April 2021.
- Usmani, Afzal. "Allama Shibli Nomani by Shaikh Abdullah (Papa Mian)". Aligarh Movement. Archived from the original on 27 April 2021.
- Zilli, Ishtiyaq Ahmad. "Allama Shibli and Aligarh Movement". Aligarh Movement. Archived from the original on 26 April 2021.

== Other ==
=== Theses ===
- Afroz, Nishat (2018). Development of Islamic Thought in Colonial India A Study (PhD). India: Department of Islamic Studies, Aligarh Muslim University. pp. 104–112. hdl:10603/250337.
- Ahmed, Maqsood (1989). Contribution of north India to the study of islamic history from 1870 to 1947 (PhD). India: Department of Persian, Arabic and Urdu, Maharaja Sayajirao University of Baroda. hdl:10603/85304.
- Ali, Mohsin (2022). Modern Islamic Historiography: A Global Perspective from South Asia (PhD thesis). USA: University of California. pp. 120–205.
- Khan, Faisal (2008). Concept of dawah as envisaged by promrnent Indian muslim thinkers of the Twentieth century (PhD). India: Department of Islamic Studies, Aligarh Muslim University. hdl:10603/60885.
- Khan, Ghazanfar Ali (2001). Nadvat_al_Ulama: a centre of islamic learning (PhD). India: Department of Islamic Studies, Aligarh Muslim University. hdl:10603/49833.
- Mujab, Muhammad (2001). Islamic sciences in india and indonesia: a comparative study (PhD) (in Urdu). India: Department of Sunni Theology, Aligarh Muslim University. pp. 144–149. hdl:10603/58830.
- Uddin, Nizam (2016). Darulmusannfeen Shibli academy ka aitihasik adhyayan 1914 se 1947 (PhD) (in Hindi). India: Department of History, V. B. S. Purvanchal University. hdl:10603/182719.

=== Books ===
- Ahmad, Mostak (2014). The world's best 100 Muslim thinkers (in Bengali). Banglabazar, Dhaka-1100: Zhinuk Publication. p. 305.
- Bhat, Samee Ullah (2019). "Chapter 2". Islamic Historiography: Nature and Development. India: Educreation Publishing. pp. 16–38. ISBN 978-93-88910-50-7.
- Mobnu, Syed (2018). Urdu Language and Literature: Origins and Development (in Bengali). Bangladesh: Chaitanya. pp. 78–81.
- Rabbani, Gholam (2014). Contribution of Eminent Scholars to Urdu Literature (1857 - 1947) (in Bengali). Banglabazar, Dhaka: Maktabatut Taqwa. pp. 53–63, 250–268, 291–298, 372–381.
- Siddiqui, Saiful Islam (2019). Muslim Philosophical Thinkers and Scientists (in Bengali) (2nd ed.). Dhaka, Bangladesh: Rahin-Rashad Publications. pp. 423–431. ISBN 9789843442376.
- Talukder, Md. Shafiqur Rahman (2018). Hundreds of Muslim thinkers (in Bengali). Dhaka, Bangladesh: Boi Bangla. p. 287.
