= Iqbal Suhail =

Iqbal Ahmad Khan, "Suhail"
- Born: 19 December 1884; Badhariya Azamgarh, British Raj
- Died: 7 November 1955 (aged 70); Uttar Pradesh, India
- Occupations: Urdu poet, Islamic scholar, lawyer, educationist, politician
- Spouse: Ummdat-un-nisa
- Children: Razia Ansari; Yameenul Islam Khan; Bushra Khanum; Mohsina Khanum; Muslima Khanum; Islam Ahmad; Marzia Khanum; Qudsia Khanam
- Relatives: Azizullah Khan (father); Umm Kulsum (mother)

Iqbal Ahmed Khan was born in 1884 (11 Rabi' al-thani, 1303 Hijri) in village Badhariya, Azamgarh, and died on 7 November 1955 and his ancestors belongs to a Village name Ledrahi (Jaunpur). He was a famous Urdu poet, writing under the takhallus, or pen name "Suhail", Islamic scholar, lawyer, educationist and a politician. He was a member of the executive committee of the Azamgarh Muslim Education Society, which manages Shibli National Post Graduate College and other institutions in Azamgarh, Uttar Pradesh. His poetry has been mentioned in many articles about Azamgarh. His work has been featured in the Encyclopedic Dictionary of Urdu Literature. edited by .

== Political career ==
Iqbal Suhail was elected to the Uttar Pradesh Legislative Assembly as a candidate with the Indian National Congress party in 1937. This assembly was constituted by the Act of 1935. He defeated Syed Ali Zaheer, who ran as a Muslim League candidate. Iqbal Suhail was against the partition of the country and opposed the two-nation theory of a separate Muslim homeland. He was a good friend of Zakir Husain.

== Education ==
Iqbal Suhail's early schooling was under Maulana Mohammed Shafi who was one of the founders of Madarsatul Islah, Sarai Mir, Azamgarh. Maulana Shafi was the father of the famous Urdu poet Khalilur-Rehman Azmi.

- 1918 – Completed M.A. and LL.B. from Aligarh Muslim University. After getting his law degree from Aligarh, Iqbal Sohail returned to Azamgarh to practice. There he became associated with Allama Shibli Nomani, whom he revered very much. He was a regular visitor to Darul Musannifeen (Shibli Academy, the institute founded by Allama Shibli)
- 1916 – Master of Arts
- 1914 Aligarh, During his stay in Aligarh he became famous for his skill in poetry and speech-writing. Dr. Zakir Hussain and Prof. Rasheed Ahmad Siddiqui became his closest friends. He also wrote many speeches for Dr. Hussain. This was acknowledged by Dr. Hussain in the preface he wrote for Tabish-e-Suhail, a collection of poetry written by Iqbal Suhail.
- 1914 – Graduated from Queens College, Varanasi
- 1913 – Completed Intermediate
- 1907-8 – To pursue his education in Arabic and Persian and Islamic studies, he stayed with Maulana Hamiduddin Farahi, who was Arabic professor in MAO College, Aligarh, where he came into contact with Maulana Hasrat Mohani, Maulana Hali and Maulana Wahiduddin Salim Panipati.

== Bibliography ==
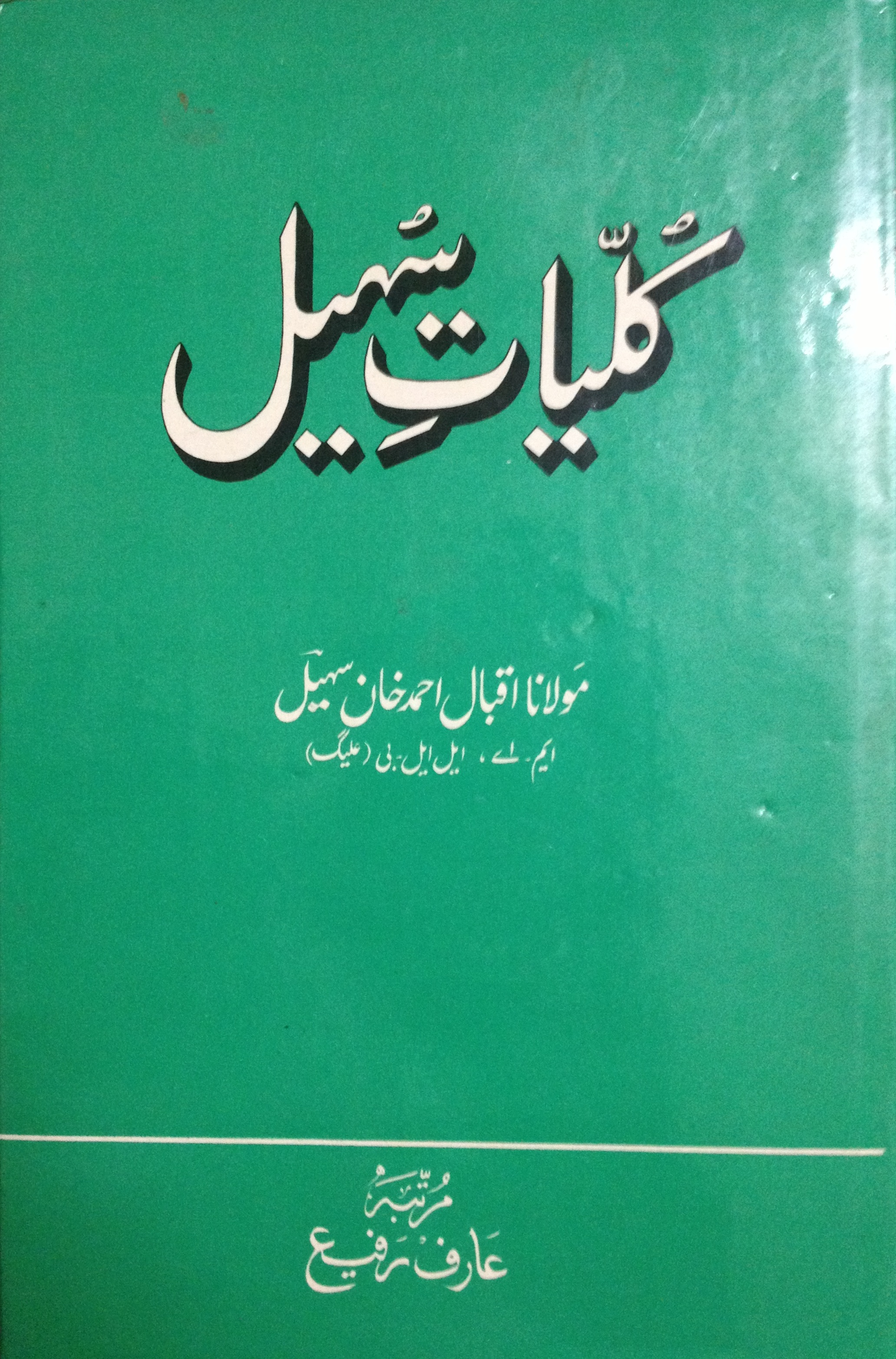
Cover of the Book Kuliat-e-Suhail

- Kuliat-e-Suhail (Compiled by Arif Rafi an Published by Shibli Academy, Azamgarh)
- Tabish-e-Suhail (Compiled by Iftikhaar Azmi)
- Ifkaar-e-Suhail (Special Edition of Shibli National College Magazine)
- Special Edition of Mohammed Hasan College, (Jaunpur) Magazine
- Armughaan-e-Haram (Collection of Naat)
- What is Ribaa? Published by Pharos Media Publications, Delhi (Available in Arabic and Urdu)
- Hayat-e-Shibli (Published in Al-Islah, Monthly magazine of Madarsatul-Islah)
