= Darul Musannefin Shibli Academy =

Research academy in India

- Location: 35HM+G9P, Allama Shibli Marg, Mukeriganj, Azamgarh, Uttar Pradesh, India
- Type: Research academy
- Established: 21 November 1914 (111 years ago)

Other information
- Director: Prof. Ishtiyaq Ahmad Zilli
- Parent organization: Nadwatul Ulama

Darul Musannefin Shibli Academy is a research academy based in Azamgarh, Uttar Pradesh, India. Its aim was to add authentic historical literature in Urdu so that people could have easy access to history. It was started as Darul Musannefin but later it was named after Shibli Nomani. Ma'arif is its official publication.

== History ==
It was founded by a Sunni Muslim scholar Shibli Nomani, in February 1914. Nomani failed to establish the Academy in Lucknow, it was established in Azamgarh at Nomani's mango orchard. It was established on 21 November 1914, 3 days after Nomani's death by Maulana Hamiduddin Farahi. The founders included Maulana Sayyid Sulaiman Nadvi, Maulana Abdus Salam Nadvi and Maulana Masood Ali Nadvi.

In February 2016, the academy declined a grant of five lakh rupees from the Government of Uttar Pradesh, stating that it was inappropriate for an Islamic institution.

== Researchers ==
- Moinuddin Ahmad Nadwi
- Abdul Salam Nadwi
- Sulaiman Nadvi
- Ryasat Ali Nadvi
- Syed Abu Zafar Nadvi
- Sabahuddin Abdur Rahman
- Najeeb Ashraf Nadvi
- Dr Muhammad Uzair
- Saeed Ansari
- Abdussalam Qadwai
- Haji Mueenuddin
- Mujeebullah Nadvi
