= Shibli Nomani =

Indian Islamic scholar and philosopher (1857–1914)

Shamsul Ulama OM Shibli Nomani

Professor at Muhammadan Anglo-Oriental College
- In office 1882–1898

Secretary of Education Department at Darul Uloom Nadwatul Ulama
- In office 1905–1913

Personal details
- Born: 4 June 1857 Azamgarh, North-Western Provinces, British India
- Died: 18 November 1914 (aged 57)
- Spouse: Majidunnessa (m. 1876)
- Children: 3
- Parents: Shaikh Habibullah (father); Moqeema Khatoon (mother)

Personal life
- Main interest(s): Literature, history, modernism, Islamic philosophy, politics, education
- Notable works: Darul Musannefin Shibli Academy; Shibli National College; Madrasatul Islah
- Website: shibliacademy.org

Religious life
- Denomination: Sunni
- Movement: Aligarh Movement; Nadwatul Ulama

Senior posting
- Teacher: Ahmad Ali Saharanpuri; Faizul Hasan Saharanpuri
- Influenced by: Syed Ahmad Khan Thomas Walker Arnold
- Influenced: Muhammad Iqbal Mohandas Karamchand Gandhi Abul Kalam Azad Hussain Ahmad Madani Sulaiman Nadvi Abul Hasan Ali Hasani Nadwi Hamiduddin Farahi Amin Ahsan Islahi Javed Ahmad Ghamidi Mohammad Ali Jauhar Saifuddin Kitchlew Abdul Salam Nadwi Iqbal Suhail Zafar Ali Khan Abdul Bari Nadvi
- Awards: Order of the Medjidie by the Ottoman Empire; Shamsul Ulama by the British Empire

Shibli Nomani (4 June 1857 – 18 November 1914) was an Indian Islamic scholar, poet, philosopher, historian, educational thinker, author, orator, reformer and critic of orientalists during the British Raj. He is regarded as the father of Urdu historiography. He was also proficient in Arabic and Persian languages. Shibli was associated with two influential movements in the region, the Aligarh and the Nadwa movements. As a supporter of the Deobandi school, he believed that English language and European sciences should be incorporated into the education system. Shibli wrote several biographies of Muslim heroes, convinced that Muslims of his time could learn valuable lessons from the past. His synthesis of past and modern ideas contributed significantly to Islamic literature produced in Urdu between 1910 and 1935. Shibli established the Darul Musannefin Shibli Academy in 1914 to promote Islamic scholarship and also founded the Shibli National College in 1883. He collected much material on the life of Muhammad, and completed the first two volumes of the planned work, Sirat al-Nabi. His disciple, Sulaiman Nadvi, added to this material and wrote the remaining five volumes after Shibli's death.

== Biography ==
=== Early life ===
Nomani was born on 4 June 1857 in Bindwal near Azamgarh into a Muslim Rajput family, his ancestor Sheoraj Singh being a Bais who accepted Islam many generations ago, to Habibullah and Moqeema Khatoon. He was named after Abu Bakr al-Shibli who was a Sufi saint and a disciple of Junayd Baghdadi. Later in life, he added "Nomani" to his name. Although his younger brothers went to London, England for education (and later returned, one as a barrister employed at Allahabad High Court), Nomani received a traditional Islamic education. His teacher was Muhammad Farooq Chirayakoti, a rationalist scholar.

Nomani therefore had reasons to be both attracted and repelled by Aligarh. Even after he had secured a post as a teacher of Persian and Arabic at Aligarh, he always found the intellectual atmosphere at the college disappointing, and eventually left Aligarh because he found it uncongenial, although he did not officially resign from the college until after the death of its founder Sir Syed Ahmed Khan in 1898.

=== In the Middle East ===
He taught Persian and Arabic languages for 16 years at Aligarh, where he met Thomas Arnold and other British scholars, discussing modern Western ideas with them. He travelled with Arnold in 1892 to the Ottoman Empire including Syria, Turkey, and Egypt, and gained direct experience of their societies. In Istanbul, he received a medal from Sultan Abdul Hamid II. In Cairo, he met noted Islamic scholar Muhammad Abduh (1849-1905).

=== In Hyderabad and Lucknow ===
After the death of Sir Syed Ahmed in 1898, he left Aligarh University and became an advisor in the Education Department of Hyderabad State. He initiated many reforms in the Hyderabad education system. From his policy, the Osmania University of Hyderabad adopted Urdu as the medium of instruction. Before that, no other university of India had adopted any vernacular language as the medium of instruction in higher studies. In 1905, he left Hyderabad and went to Lucknow as principal and driving force of the Darul Uloom Nadwatul Ulama, a madrasa founded by the Nadwatul Ulama. He introduced reforms in the school's teaching and curriculum. He stayed at the school for five years, but the orthodox class of scholars became hostile towards him, and he had to leave Lucknow to settle in the area around his hometown, Azamgarh in 1913.

=== Founding of Darul Mussanifin ===
Earlier at Nadwa, he had wanted to establish Darul Musannifin or the House of Writers but he could not do this at that time. He bequeathed his bungalow and mango orchard and motivated the members of his clan and relatives to do the same and had succeeded. He wrote letters to his disciples and other eminent persons and sought their co-operation. Eventually one of his disciples, Syed Sulaiman Nadvi fulfilled his dream and established Darul Musannifin at Azamgarh. The first formal meeting of the institution was held on 21 November 1914, within three days of his death.

=== Death ===
In August 1914 he went to Allahabad on the news of his elder brother's illness. Two weeks later his brother died. He then moved to Azamgarh. There he developed the basic concept of Darul Musannifin. He died on 18 November 1914.

== Ideology ==
Nomani and Syed Ahmed wished for the welfare of Muslims and wanted to have Western thinking and style come along with it. However, Sir Syed wanted to save the Muslims from the wrath of the British rulers after their active participation in the War of Independence of 1857, called the "Sepoy Mutiny" by the British, whereas Shibli wanted to make them self-reliant and self-respecting by regaining their lost heritage and tradition.

=== Aligarh movement ===
According to some scholars, Shibli was against the Aligarh movement. He opposed the ideology of Sir Syed and that is why he was debarred from the services of Muhammadan Anglo-Oriental College. Kamleshwar wrote a novel 'Kitne Pakistan' (How Many Pakistan?) and in that novel he portrays Nomani as a narrow-minded Muslim theologian. In another book, 'Ataturk Fi Karbala' by Arif ul Islam, the author alleged that Shibli was not happy with Sir Syed's policies and ideologies and was involved vehemently against Aligarh movement.

== Legacy ==
Nomani had two daughters, Rabia Khatoon and Jannutul Fatima, and one son, Hamid Hassan Nomani. This son was born in 1882 and died in 1942. He had another son who died soon after birth, and five daughters. They are:

- Naseem Jehan, retired director of health, Bangladesh, died in Karachi in 1994. She was married in 1940 to Dr Zafrul Huda of Dhaka University. He died in 1978 at Dhaka. They have one daughter.
- Shamim Jehan (died in Karachi in 2005), married in 1940 to Ehtesham Ahmed, who died in 1982. They have eight sons and seven daughters.
- Tehseen Jehan, married in 1940 to Shaukat Sultan, principal of Shibli National College, Azamgarh. She is living in Karachi, Pakistan these days. They have three sons and four daughters.
- Mohsina Sultana, married in 1950 to Amanullah Khan, director of industries, Uttar Pradesh, India. They have four sons and one daughter.
- Momina Sultan, married in 1952 to Captain Khan Sohail Sultan. They have four sons.

Pakistan Postal Services issued a commemorative postage stamp in his honor in its 'Pioneers of Freedom' series in 1992.

=== The Shibli Project ===
The Shibli Project, undertaken by the Department of Arabic at Jamia Millia Islamia, aims to preserve the legacy of Shibli Nomani and make his works accessible to a wider audience. As part of the Shibli Project, students are encouraged to study the life of Shibli and his books. They are asked to write articles on the various shades of his life and to write reviews of his works. Students are also encouraged to make projects that showcase his life and contributions and to prepare charts related to his life. The Shibli Project also seeks to promote compatibility among the disciplines of Urdu, Islamiyat, and History. As part of this effort, students are encouraged to study Shibli's poetic works and to organise educational tours to Darul Musannifin, Azamgarh, and Lucknow to meet with Shibli's disciples and gain more insight into his life and works. One of the highlights of the Shibli Project is an exhibition on his life and contributions. The exhibition showcases the various facets of Shibli's life and works, including his scholarship, poetry, and activism. It also provides visitors with a glimpse into the cultural and intellectual milieu of early 20th-century India.

== Works ==
Shamsur Rahman Faruqi, the poet, author, critic and literary theorist argued that Shibli's work has been unjustly dealt with:

While Maulana Aslam Jairajpuri pointed out errors in Sher-ul-Ajam, it was not mentioned that Shibli was the first to write a biography of Maulana Rumi. Though differences between Sir Syed and Shibli are highlighted, it has not been pointed out that in spite of Sir Syed's opposition to the writing of Al-Farooq, Shibli never complained about it. Sir Syed lamented that Shibli's Persian poetry was never tested on its merit and was wrongly associated with his acquaintance with an enlightened intellectual lady of the time, Madam Atiya Fyzee.

— Shamsur Rahman Faruqi, Shibli Nomani Annual Extension Lecture (2011)

Faruqi refuted S. M. Ikram's claim in this regard and subtly highlighted the delicacy of Shibli's thought moulded into his Persian poetry.

Shibli was inspired by the progress of science and education in the West. He wanted to inspire the Muslims to make similar progress by having recourse to their lost heritage and culture, and warned them against getting lost in Western culture. "Ultimately, the Nadwa gave up its notions of uniting occidental and oriental knowledge and concentrated on Islamic scholarship, and on the dissemination of biographical and historical writing in Urdu. Shibli's own writings set the pattern for the latter." In keeping with this goal, he wrote the following books:

- Sirat-un-Nabi (Life of the Prophet) Shibli Nomani started to write this book but he died in 1914, then his student Sulaiman Nadvi took over the responsibility of finishing it and finally completed this book.
- Sirat-un-Noman
- Al-Faruq, (a biography of the Caliph Omar Farooq)
- Al-Ma'mun
- Al-Ghazali, (a biography of al-Ghazali)
- Imam Ibn-e-Tamia (edited by Mohammad Tanzeel-ul-Siddiqi al-Husaini),
- Sawanih Maulana Rum
- Aurangzeb Alamgir par ek nazar
- Sher-ul-ʻAjam, a history of Persian poetry
- Ilm-ul-Kalam, a history of Muslim theology
- Al-Kalam, foundation of modern Kalam
- Safarnama Rum-o-Misr-o-Sham, a travelogue of Rome, Egypt, Syria and Turkey along with his scholar companion Thomas Walker Arnold in 1892
- An Enquiry Into the Destruction of the Ancient Alexandrian Library
- Al-Jizya

== See also ==
- Bibliography of Shibli Nomani
