= Desna, Bihar =

Village in Bihar, India

Coordinates: 25°14′N 85°38′E

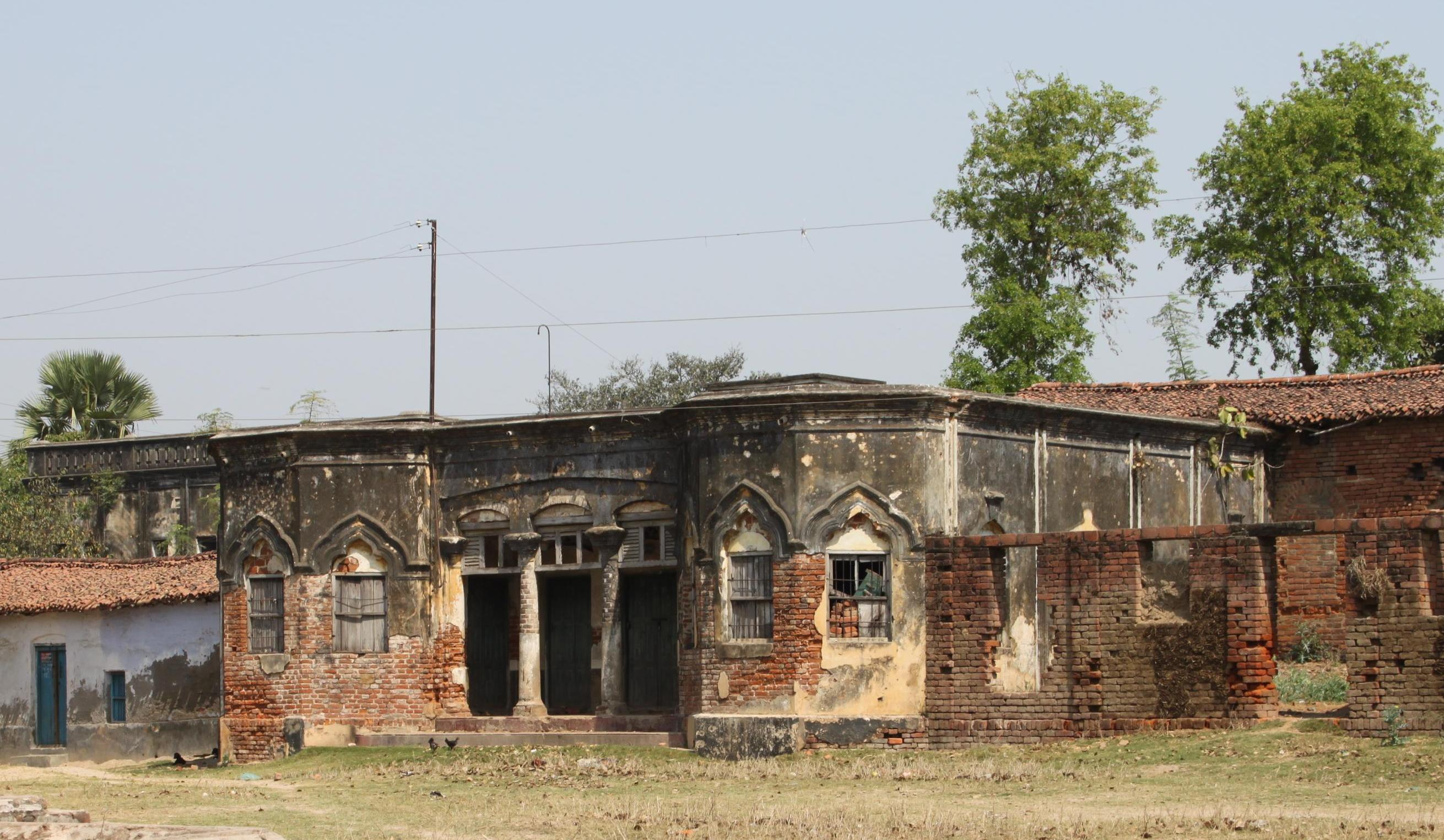
Desna Library

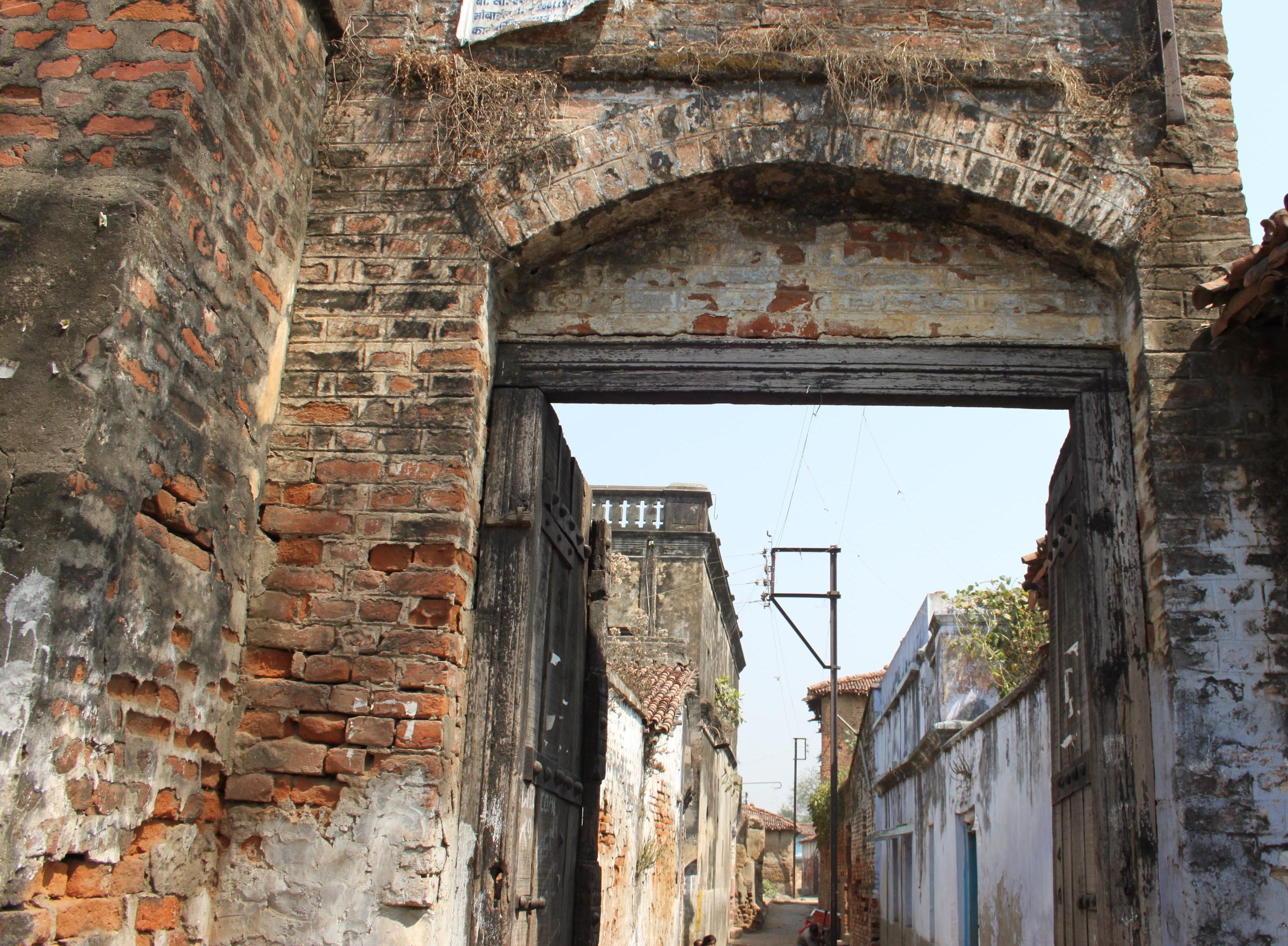
Desna Village Gate

Desna is a very old village located on the banks of the River Jerain in Nalanda district of Bihar state in India. It is approximately 2 miles (1 Kos) from Asthawan and 10 miles from Bihar Sharif.

== History ==
Desna was a Saadat village. Desna produced luminaries like Hakim Syed Jannat Hussian Sarbahadi, Syed Tajammul Hussian Desnavi founding member of Darul Uloom Nadwatul Ulama, Syed Sulaiman Nadvi, Syed Mohammed Saeed Raza, Brigedier Malik Muhammad Mukhtar Karim, Abdul Qavi Desnavi.

Desna's library, established in 1892, had thousands of old Persian and Urdu manuscripts. After the partition of India, during uncertain times of mass emigration to Pakistan, the books were donated to Khuda Bakhsh Khan Library in Patna, where a Desna section was established to house these treasures.

Desna also had a wall with gates encircling the village, defending it from outsiders.

Rizvi, Syeds, Zaidi and Mallicks were the prominent families living together.
