= Sulaiman Nadvi =

Deobandi Islamic scholar (1884–1953)

Syed Sulaiman Nadwi
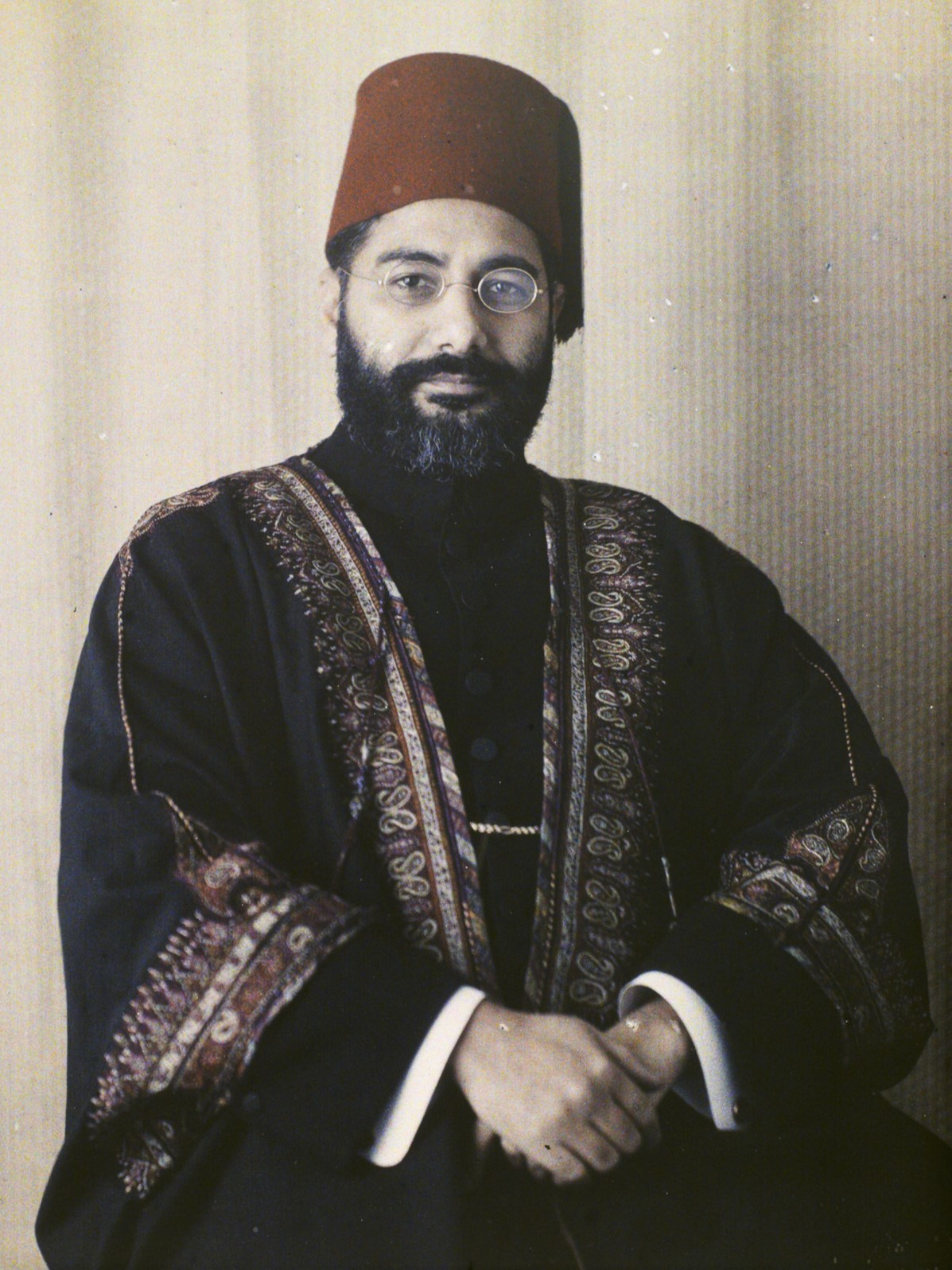
- Autochrome portrait by Auguste Léon, 1920

Personal life
- Born: Syed Sulaiman Nadvi; 22 November 1884 Desna, Bengal Presidency, British India (present day Bihar, India)
- Died: 22 November 1953 (aged 69) Karachi, Federal Capital Territory, Pakistan
- Main interest(s): History, Seerah, Urdu Literature
- Notable work(s): Khutbat-e-Madras, Sirat-un-Nabi, Arb-o-Hind Ke Talluqat, Naqoosh-e-Sulaimani

Religious life
- Religion: Islam
- Founder of: Darul Musannifeen (Shibli Academy), Azamgarh

Muslim leader
- Disciple of: Ashraf Ali Thanwi
- Students: Moinuddin Ahmad Nadwi

Sulaiman Nadvi (22 November 1884 – 22 November 1953) was a British Indian, and then Pakistani, Islamic scholar, historian and a writer, who co-authored Sirat-un-Nabi and wrote Khutbat-e-Madras.

He was a member of the founding committee of Jamia Millia Islamia University. He was also the founding editor of Ma'arif.

== Early life and education ==
Sulaiman Nadvi was born on 22 November 1884 in Desna, a village of Nalanda District, Bihar, India (then in the Patna District, in the Bengal Presidency of British India). His father, Hakeem Sayyed Abul Hasan was a Sufi.

Sulaiman Nadvi was influenced by Shibli Nomani at Lucknow. In 1906, he graduated from Darul Uloom Nadwatul Ulama. In 1908, Nadvi was appointed as an instructor of Modern Arabic and Theology at Nadva. Sulaiman Nadvi was one of the favorite pupils of Maulana Shibli Nomani, along with Maulana Abul Kalam Azad; Nadvi became one of the biographers of the Prophet of Islam and a historian during his own lifetime. Allama Iqbal, too was a great admirer of his erudition and used to refer to him as Ustad ul Kul ("Teacher of all"), and is said to have approached him on religious matters.

Later in life, he formed a close spiritual relation with Maulana Ashraf Ali Thanwi, and became his disciple.

Aligarh Muslim University conferred on him the honorary degree of Doctorate of Literature (DLitt) in 1941.

== Contribution to Islamic literature ==
In 1933, he published one of his major works, Khayyam. The nucleus of this book was an article on the noted Persian scholar and poet Omar Khayyam.

Sulaiman Nadvi, along with others who favored Hindu-Muslim unity in British India, suggested that the term "Urdu" be abandoned in favour of "Hindustani" because the former conjured up the image of a military conquest and war whereas the latter had no such symbolic baggage.

Sulaiman Nadvi founded Darul Musannifeen (Academy of Authors), also known as the Shibli Academy, at Azamgarh. The first book published there was Ard-ul-Quran (2 volumes).

== Later life and death ==
In June 1950, Nadvi moved to Pakistan and settled in Karachi. He was appointed Chairman of Taleemat-e-Islami Board to advise on Islamic aspects of Pakistan's Constitution. He died on 22 November 1953 in Karachi at the age of 69.

However, his son Salman Nadvi asserts that they didn't move to Pakistan with the intention of migration. Right after they reached Pakistan, Sulaiman Nadvi's health deteriorated and he tried unsuccessfully to get his permit extended from the Indian embassy, which caused grief and pain.

== Commemorative postage stamp ==
Pakistan Post Office issued a commemorative postage stamp to honor his services in its 'Pioneers of Freedom' Series on 14 August 1992.

== Literary work ==
Nadvi's works include:

- Ahl-us-Sunnah-wal-Jamā‘ah
- The Arab Navigation, lectures delivered in Bombay during March 1931.
- Khayyam, about the contributions of Omar Khayyam, published in 1933, OCLC 295035038.
- Khutbat-e-Madras
- Rahmat-e-Aalam
- Seerat-e-Aisha
- Sirat-un-Nabi (Life of the Prophet) by Shibli Nomani, the teacher of Sulaiman Nadvi. Shibli started writing this book, which was later finished by Sulaiman Nadvi after Shibli's death in 1914.
- Rahmat-e-Aalam
- Tarikh ardul Quran
- Risala Ahlus Sunnat wal Jamaat

== See also ==
- Shibli Nomani
- Muhammad Ali Jauhar
- Khilafat Movement
- Allama Muhammad Iqbal
