= Khalid Masud =

Pakistani scholar and scientist (1935–2003)

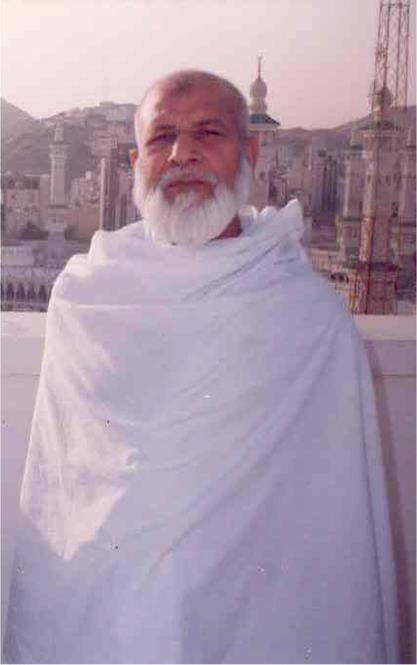
- Born: 16 December 1935
- Died: 1 October 2003 (aged 67)

Philosophical work
- Era: Modern era
- Region: Pakistan
- School: Farahi-Islahi
- Main interests: Qur'an; Hadith; Sirah; Science
- Notable ideas: Sirah in light of Qur'an

Allama Khalid Masud (16 December 1935 – 1 October 2003) was a Muslim scholar of Pakistan. He spent the major part of his life with Maulana Amin Ahsan Islahi. He conveyed the ideas and thoughts of his teacher and Imam Farahi to the general public. He wrote a number of books and articles and delivered lectures on Islam, science, and other subjects.

By profession, he was a chemical engineer, but he spent his life serving Farahi's school of thought. He worked as the in charge of Idara Taddabur e Qur'an o Hadith.

== Early life ==
Allama Khalid Masud was born in Lilla Town, Jhelum District, Pakistan. He belonged to a religious family with an association with the Sufi school of thought, Naqshbandi Mujaddadi. But he and his father Saif U Rehman were both not influenced by Sufism, and they focused mainly on the Qur'an and Sharia. His father Saif U Rehman completed his education in 1926 from Oriental College Lahore, where he learned Arabic as a major subject. He was a scholarly person. He kept his eldest son with him during his teaching service in schools of different cities. He played a major role in the upbringing of his beloved child. Khalid Masud learned the basics of Arabic and Persian from his father Saif U Rehman, who was an Arabic teacher at the time.

== Education and career ==
He did his Master's degree in Chemistry from Punjab University, Lahore, in 1958. In 1964, he went to London for higher studies. He obtained a Chemical Engineering Diploma from King's College in 1965. He remained the President of the UK Islamic Mission there. He also obtained his Master's degree in Islamic Studies from Punjab University in 1975.

He joined the Industries Department, Government of Punjab in 1958. He worked there for 27 years. In 1985, he was offered the position of Research Scholar in Quaid e Azam Library, Bagh e Jinnah Lahore. He worked there till his retirement in 1996. There, he found every opportunity to do his research work.

During his student life (from 1956 to 1958), he remained in charge / Nazam of Islami Jamiat-e-Talaba Lahore. But after completion of his studies, he did not join Jamiat's parent party Jamat-e-Islami and preferred to learn Qur'an and Hadith from Maulana Amin Ahsan Islahi.

== Association with Maulana Islahi ==
In 1958, Maulana Amin Ahsan Islahi separated from politics and Jamat-e-Islami and created the Halqa Taddabur Qur'an O Hadith. Khalid Masud was one of his early pupils who joined his Halqa. He was his only pupil who spent so much time with him from 1958 until his death. He associated himself with Maulana Amin Ahsan Islahi and remained with him till his death. Khalid Masud played a major role in converting the knowledge of his teacher from his lectures into text for the benefit of the public. He also helped him in writing his famous tafsir Taddabur e Qur'an. Maulana Islahi admired a number of times his efforts in spreading Farahi's and Islahi's schools of thought. Maulana Islahi appointed him Nazam of his Idara Taddabur Qur'an o Hadith and chief editor of his quarterly journal Taddabur in 1981. He served his teacher and Idara for twenty-two years till his death in 2003.

After the death of Maulana Islahi, the management of Madras Ul Islah, Siray Mir Azam Garh UP India arranged the Imam Farahi Seminar in January 1999 and especially invited Allama Khalid Masud in place of Maulana Islahi. He presented two papers there. They offered him the chair of Imam Farahi for presiding the seminar.

== Books and magazines ==
He wrote a number of books on Qur'an, Hadith, Grammar, Islam, and Science for all ages.

=== Qur'an ===
- Qur'an e Hakim (قرآن حکیم)

Abridged version of Maulana Islahi's Tadabbur-i-Qur'an in one volume.

- Hikmat e Qur'an ( حکمت قرآن)

Based on Allama Hamiduddin Farahi's Arabic books. He converted it into the Urdu Language for the benefit of the general public.

=== Hadith ===
- Taddabur e Hadith (تدبر حدیث) – Sahih Bukhari by Maulana Amin Ahsan Islahi {Two Volumes}
- Taddabur e Hadith – Mowta Imam Malik by Maulana Amin Ahsan Islahi {Two Volumes}

He converted his teacher Maulana Islahi's audio lectures into books by editing and adding and deleting necessary or unnecessary portions.

=== Sirah ===
- Hayat e Rasul e Ummi.

Hayat-e-Rasul-e-Ummi

In this book, he tried to discuss and to clarify some issues related to the life of Muhammad in the light of the Qur'an with a non-traditional approach; He presented the Quran as the first source of history. Then he accepted those narrations which matched the Quran's statements. He did not accept any narration which was in contradiction the Quran. Moreover, he sorted out different narrations in a very logical manner.

=== Imam Farahi's work ===
Most of Farahi's work was in Arabic. Farahi's chief scholarly interest was the Quran, the focal point of all his writings. Most of his published works are in the form of notes that were later compiled by his followers such as Maulana Amin Ahsan Islahi and Allama Khalid Masud.

Below are some of the books which were compiled by both personalities:

- Mufradat al Quran (”Vocabulary of the Quran") (مفردات القرآن)
- Asalib al Quran (”Style of the Quran")
- Jamhara-tul-Balaghah (”Manual of Quranic Rhetoric")
- Im’an Fi Aqsam al-Qur’an (A Study of the Qur’anic Oaths)
- 'في من هو الذبيح' (Fi man huwa al-Dhabih: Which of Abraham's son was sacrificed?)
- Nizam al-Qur’an (Coherence in the Qur’an, a commentary on the Qur’an)

=== Grammar ===
- Asbaq Al Nahw

This book is a reproduction of the original work of Maulana Hamiduddin Farahi. He added more exercises and extended the chapters to customise it for students in simple language. His efforts made it easier for students to learn Arabic grammar.

=== For children ===
He wrote a number of books for children on the topics of science. These include:

- Ibtedai Falkiyat in Urdu (Basic Astronomy)
- Kurrah Zamin in Urdu (Earth)
- Podun ki Zindagi in Urdu (Life of Plants)
- Alam e Haywanat in Urdu (Zoology)
- Musalman aur Science in Urdu (Muslims and Science)
- Ibtedai Bahr Pamai in Urdu (Basic Navigation)

The above books were published by Quaid e Azam Library Lahore for children on science.

=== Translations into Urdu ===
He translated the following major books into the Urdu language to make it easier for students of science and philosophy.

- Francis Bacon's Novum Organum with Neo-atlantas.

It describes Bacon's belief that new system of logic is superior to the old ways of syllogism.

- Bertrand Russell's Our Knowledge of the External World
  . This book expresses much of Russell's thinking about science.
- Isaac Newton's Philosophiæ Naturalis Principia Mathematica (Latin: "The Mathematical Principles of Natural Philosophy").It contains the statement of Newton's laws of motion forming the foundation of classical mechanics, as well as his law of universal gravitation and a derivation of Kepler's laws for the motion of the planets.
- Isaac Newton's Opticks. This book is about optics and the refraction of light.

Those books were published by the National Language Authority of Pakistan.

=== Magazines ===
He performed editorial work of a few magazines in the following capacities:

- Chief editor of Tadabbur (a quarterly journal of Idara Taddabur i Qur'an o Hadith. It publishes articles on Farahi's and Islahi's School of thoughts). He was its first editor and kept working there until his death.
- Editor of the Quarterly Journal of Quaid e Azam Library.

On joining Quaid e Azam Library in 1985, the editorial responsibility of its quarterly journal was handed over to him. He worked for it till his retirement in 1995.

In addition to the above, he wrote for various other magazines such as Meesaq and Shams ul Islam.

=== Professional work ===
He wrote a number of articles during his service in the Punjab Industries Department, Lahore. These include:

- Chemical Investigations on the seeds of Ficus Bangalensis.
- Synthetic tanning materials from black liquor.
- Mechanism of heat transfer in the boiling regime.
- Sulfur dyes from black liquor.
- Survey report on the paint & varnish industry in Punjab.

== Death ==
He had been suffering from hepatitis C for a number of years. He died on 1 October 2003 at 2:20 pm in Jinnah Hospital, Lahore. Famous scholar and companion of the Islahi School of Thought, Allama Javed Ahmed Ghamidi, offered his funeral prayer at Dongi Ground, Samanabad, Lahore. He was buried in his native village Lilla, in Jhelum District with his ancestors.

== See also ==
- Islamic scholars
- List of Pakistanis
- Lilla, Jhelum
