= Muhammad Farooq Khan =

Pakistani psychiatrist and Islamic scholar (1956–2010)

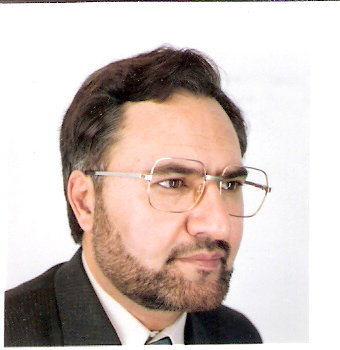
- Born: 1956; Swabi, Mardan Division, N.W.F.P, Pakistan
- Died: 2 October 2010 (aged 53–54); Baghdada, Mardan, Pakistan

Philosophical work
- Era: Modern era
- Region: Khyber Pakhtunkhwa, Pakistan
- School: Farahi-Islahi
- Main interests: Islamic law and Quranic exegesis As well as influenced by: Hamiduddin Farahi; Amin Ahsan Islahi; Javed Ahmed Ghamidi; Sayyid Abul Ala Maududi; Averroes
- Notable ideas: Separation of Fiqh (Islamic jurisprudence) from Sharia (Divine law)
- Website: www.drfarooqkhan.com

Muhammad Farooq Khan was a Pakistani psychiatrist, scholar of Islam and vice-chancellor of University of Swat.

He was known for his opposition to Islamist militancy and described suicide attacks as un-Islamic. Due to his views, he was assassinated on 2 October 2010.

He got his basic education from District Swabi. He then joined Cadet College, Hasanabdal and later on Cadet College, Kohat. After having studied medicine, he decided to specialize in psychiatry. He established his private practice in Baghdada, Mardan. The Government of Pakistan had appointed him as the first Vice-Chancellor of Swat Islamic University some time before his death. He was awarded Sitara e Imtiaz posthumously by the Government of Pakistan for his services. Khan was a psychiatrist by profession. He frequently took part in television talk shows at which he used to criticise militants and described suicide attacks as un-Islamic.

Dr. Muhammad Farooq Khan was a devoted student and associate of Javed Ahmad Ghamidi, deeply influenced by his teachings. Both were influenced by Amin Ahsan Islahi and sought to derive Islamic understanding directly from primary sources (Quran and Sunnah). Khan was associated with Ghamidi's initiative, Al-Mawrid, an organization for Islamic research and education.Khan and Ghamidi, along with other close associates, faced threats due to their reformist views, leading to Ghamidi's self-imposed exile from Pakistan.

In his student days, he was an active member of the Islami Jamiat-i-Talaba. Later on, he took part in a general election on a Jamaat-i-Islami ticket. However, he was expelled from the Jamaat after writing a book. For some time he also remained associated with the Tehrik-i-Insaf.

== Books ==
Dr Farooq Presenting Quran to Police Chief of Mardan Division

He was the author of several books on different issues but his main interest areas were the study of Quran and Islam. Khan was the author of several books including the following:

- Pakistan and the Twenty First Century (Urdu),
- Jihad, Qital and Islamic world (Urdu)
- What is Islam? (Urdu)
- Islam and Women (Urdu & English)
- Dialogue with the West (English)
- Kashmir Issue (Urdu & English)
- The questions of Modern Mind and Reply of Islam (Urdu)
- Critical study of Ordinance of Hudood, Qisas and Diyat (Urdu)

== Assassination ==
He was assassinated on 2 October 2010 in his clinic at Baghdada, Mardan when two armed young men entered his clinic and opened fire at him. Dr Khan and his assistant died at the spot. Taliban claims responsibility of his murder. He was the Vice-Chancellor of University of Swat.
