= Zainul Abideen Azmi =

Indian Islamic scholar and hadith specialist (1932–2013)

Mawlana Zainul Abideen Azmi

Personal life
- Born: 30 October 1932 Pura Maroof, Azamgarh district (now Mau district), United Provinces of Agra and Oudh, British India
- Died: 28 April 2013 (aged 80) Pura Maroof, Mau district, Uttar Pradesh, India
- Main interests: Hadith studies; Biographical evaluation; Islamic jurisprudence
- Notable works: Takmilah Imdād al-Bārī; Wafayātu Man Yu'tamad Qawluhu fī al-Jarḥ wa al-Ta'dīl; A'lām al-Muḥaddithīn; Nukhab min Asmā' Rijāl al-Ṣiḥāḥ
- Education: Madrasa Maroofia, Pura Maroof; Madrasa Ihyaul Uloom, Mubarakpur; Darul Uloom Deoband
- Occupation: Islamic scholar, muhaddith, jurist, writer

Religious life
- Religion: Islam
- Denomination: Sunni
- Jurisprudence: Hanafi
- Movement: Deobandi

Muslim leader
- Teacher: Hussain Ahmad Madani; Izaz Ali Amrohi; Ibrahim Balyawi; Fakhrul Hasan Moradabadi; Naseer Ahmad Khan; Mahdi Hasan Shahjahanpuri
- Students: Abdullah Maroofi

Zainul Abideen Azmi (1932–2013) was an Indian Islamic scholar, muhaddith (hadith specialist), jurist, and writer associated with the Deobandi tradition. He was educated at Darul Uloom Deoband and remained engaged with the teaching, transmission, and study of hadith and related Islamic sciences for nearly six decades.

Azmi taught at a number of Islamic seminaries in different capacities, including advanced hadith instruction. In the later part of his career, he served at Mazahir Uloom Jadeed, Saharanpur, where from 1995 until his death he headed the Department of Specialisation in Hadith. He also authored and edited several works in Arabic and Urdu, particularly in the fields of hadith studies and biographical criticism.

== Early life and education ==
Zainul Abideen Azmi was born on 30 October 1932 (1 Rajab 1351 AH) in Pura Maroof, Azamgarh district (present-day Mau district).

He received his early education up to Sharh Jami between 1938 and 1948 at Madrasa Maroofia in his native village. He then pursued further studies up to Hidayah (Awwalayn) at Madrasa Ihyaul Uloom, Mubarakpur.

In 1949, Azmi enrolled at Darul Uloom Deoband, where he completed the Dars-e-Nizami curriculum and graduated in 1953. During his time at Deoband, he studied hadith and other Islamic sciences, and also received instruction in tajwīd, qirāʾāt, and iftāʾ (jurisprudential writing).

His teachers at the Deoband seminary included Hussain Ahmad Madani, Izaz Ali Amrohi, Ibrahim Balyawi, Fakhrul Hasan Moradabadi, Naseer Ahmad Khan, and Mahdi Hasan Shahjahanpuri.

Under Shahjahanpuri's supervision, Azmi received practical training in iftāʾ between 1370 AH (1951) and 1379 AH (1959), during which he drafted a number of legal opinions that were reviewed and issued with authorization; copies of these fatwas are preserved in the official iftāʾ registers associated with Shahjahanpuri.

== Career ==
After completing his studies, Azmi began his teaching career in June 1953. He initially taught at a junior madrasa in Aminpur, Shasan (24 Parganas), and briefly at a maktab in Khalespur, Azamgarh. On the recommendation of his teacher Izaz Ali Amrohi, he then served for about a year at Madrasa Madinatul Uloom in Ikla Khanpur, Meerut district.

Between 1955 and 1958, he taught at a senior madrasa in Gomaphulbari, Kamrup district, Assam, where he instructed advanced texts such as Tafsir al-Jalalayn and Mishkat al-Masabih. He later returned to his alma mater, Madrasa Ihyaul Uloom, Mubarakpur, where he taught Arabic studies until 1970.

During this period, in addition to his teaching responsibilities, Azmi also continued his juristic work (iftāʾ) at Madrasa Ihyaul Uloom, Mubarakpur, between 1379 AH (1959) and 1385 AH (1965).

After spending a year with the Tablighi Jamaat, Azmi joined Madrasatul Islah, Sarai Mir, where he served for nearly eight years as Shaykh al-Hadith. He also undertook juristic work there during 1392–1393 AH (1972–1973).

In 1981, he moved to Darul Uloom Chhapi in Banaskantha district, Gujarat, and taught there for five years.

He subsequently served as Shaykh al-Hadith at Jamia Mazaharul Uloom, Varanasi, for over nine years, retiring from that institution in 1993. Following his retirement, he taught for two years at Darul Uloom Sabeelus Salam, Hyderabad.

In 1995, Azmi was appointed head of the newly established Department of Specialisation in Hadith at Mazahir Uloom Jadeed, Saharanpur, a position he held until his death in 2013.

Under his supervision at Mazahir Uloom Jadeed, Saharanpur, several major research projects were undertaken within the Department of Specialisation in Hadith. These included critical editions of works such as Abdul Ghani al-Azdi's al-Mu'talif wa al-Mukhtalif fī Asmā' Naqalat al-Ḥadīth and Mushtabah al-Nisbah, completed by postgraduate students of the department. In addition, the department carried out the critical edition of al-Rudani's Jam' al-Fawā'id min Jāmi' al-Uṣūl wa Majma' al-Zawā'id under his supervision, of which eight volumes have since been published.

Among those who benefited from his teaching and scholarly guidance at the Saharanpur seminary were Abdullah Maroofi, Muhammad Husayn (Bangladesh), Abidur Rahman (Bangladesh), Amanullah (Sri Lanka), Sagheer Ahmad Pratapgarhi, Khalid Saeed Mubarakpuri, Muawiya Gorakhpuri, Abdul Azeem Balyawi, Tariq Saharanpuri, Shamsur Rahman Mauwi, and Yusuf Gujarati.

=== Spiritual affiliation ===
In 1953, Azmi entered into a spiritual relationship (bay'ah) with Hussain Ahmad Madani. After Madani's death, he later turned to Zakariyya Kandhlawi for spiritual guidance. In 1406 AH (1986), he formally pledged allegiance (bayʿah) to Abdul Jabbar Azmi Maroofi, from whom he was granted authorization (khilafah) within a short period.

== Personal life ==
Azmi was married three times. His first marriage took place in Shawwal 1369 AH (1960), and his first wife died in 1385 AH (1965). He remarried in the same year; his second wife died in 1405 AH (1985). In Shaʿban 1406 AH (1986), he entered into his third marriage.

== Literary works ==
Azmi's works include the following:

- Takmilah Imdād al-Bārī (a five-volume supplement to Abdul Jabbar Azmi's commentary on Ṣaḥīḥ al-Bukhārī, of which three volumes have been published)
- Wafayātu Man Yu'tamad Qawluhu fī al-Jarḥ wa al-Ta'dīl (an Arabic compilation and arrangement of biographical notices of early hadith critics mentioned in al-Dhahabi's treatise Man Yu'tamad Qawluhu fī al-Jarḥ wa al-Ta'dīl)
- Al-Mughnī fī Ḍabṭ al-Asmā' li-Ruwāt al-Anbā' (an edited and annotated Arabic edition of Al-Mughnī fī Ḍabṭ al-Asmā' li-Ruwāt al-Anbā' by Muhammad ibn Tahir Patani)
- Risālat al-Awā'il (a critical edition and annotated study of al-Awā'il by Muhammad Sa'īd ibn Sunbul)
- A'lām al-Muḥaddithīn (a work containing brief biographical sketches of hadith scholars)
- Nukhab min Asmā' Rijāl al-Ṣiḥāḥ (a concise identification of obscure or ambiguous narrator names found in the six canonical hadith collections)
- Al-Ta'līqāt al-Sunniyya 'alā Sharḥ al-'Aqā'id al-Nasafiyya (an Arabic commentary on al-Taftazani's Sharh al-'Aqa'id al-Nasafiyya)
- Kitāb al-Murtażā wa ghayrah kā 'ilmī iḥtisāb (a collection of three critical essays: a scholarly review of Abul Hasan Ali Nadwi's Al-Murtaḍā; responses to Shabbir Ahmad Azhar Merathi's objections regarding the Hadith al-Ifk; and corrections of errors in Azizur Rahman Bijnori's Hayāt Imām A'ẓam Abū Ḥanīfa)
- Tadhkira-yi 'Ulamā'-yi Hind (an Urdu translation of Rahman Ali Narvi's Persian work Tadhkira-yi 'Ulamā'-yi Hind)
- Juz' al-Qirā'a al-Masnūna (a treatise on prescribed recitations)
- Dalā'il al-Umūr al-Sittah wa Yalīhā Dalā'il al-Ḥamiyyah (an Arabic compilation of authentic hadiths relating to the six foundational principles of the Tablighi Jamaat)
- Asmā'-e-Ḥusnā se Istifāda (also published under the title Asmā'-e-Ḥusnā se Bandōn kī Surkhrūī; a work on deriving spiritual and ethical benefit from the Divine Names)
- 'Aqīda-Nāma (a concise Urdu explanatory guide and notes on Sharḥ al-'Aqāid al-Nasafiyya)
- 'Adad Aḥādīth Jāmi' al-Tirmidhī ma'a Ḥukm al-Tirmidhī 'Alayhā (an Arabic work enumerating the hadiths of Jami' al-Tirmidhi along with al-Tirmidhi's own gradings)
- Apnī Bātein (an autobiographical work)
- 'Arsh-e Ilāhī kā Sāya aur Naẓar-e Ilāhī se Maḥrūmī ke Asbāb (transl. On the Divine Throne's shade and the causes leading to deprivation from divine grace)

== Death ==
Azmi died on 28 April 2013 (16 Jumad al-Ukhra 1434 AH) in Poora Maroof, Mau district, Uttar Pradesh, India. He was survived by his wife, seven daughters, and two sons, Abu Ubaidah Azmi and Abdul Basit Qasmi.

His death was noted and condolences were expressed by the All India Muslim Majlis-e-Mushawarat at its meeting in New Delhi in September 2013.
