= Abdullah Maroofi =

Indian Hadith scholar (b. 1967)

Mawlana, Mufti Abdullah Maroofi
- Maroofi at the 34th Fiqhi Seminar of the Islamic Fiqh Academy (India), held in Jamshedpur, Jharkhand, in 2025.

Personal life
- Born: 1967 (age 58–59) Purana Poora, Poora Maroof, Mau district, Uttar Pradesh, India
- Main interest(s): Hadith studies, Hadith terminology, biographical evaluation
- Education: Madrasa Ishā'at-ul-Uloom, Poora Maroof; Madrasatul Islah; Darul Uloom Deoband
- Occupation: Islamic Hadith scholar, mufti, writer

Religious life
- Religion: Islam
- Denomination: Sunni
- Jurisprudence: Hanafi
- Movement: Deobandi

Muslim leader
- Teacher: Naseer Ahmad Khan; Abdul Haq Azmi; Nematullah Azmi; Saeed Ahmad Palanpuri; Arshad Madani; Abdul Khaliq Madrasi; Yunus Jaunpuri; Ashiq Ilahi Bulandshahri; Zainul Abideen Azmi
- Disciple of: Talha Kandhlawi

Abdullah Maroofi (born 1967) is an Indian Islamic scholar, mufti, and writer who specialises in Hadith studies. Since 2001, he has been serving as a lecturer in the department of specialisation in Hadith at Darul Uloom Deoband and is currently the supervisor of the department.

== Early life and education ==
Abdullah Maroofi was born in 1967 (1386 AH) in Pura Maroof, Mau District (formerly part of Azamgarh District) in Uttar Pradesh, India. His uncle, Zainul Abideen Azmi, was the former supervisor of Mazhir Uloom Jadeed's Hadith department.

He received his initial education in Madrasah Ishā'at-ul-Uloom Purah Maroof. After that he continued his Arabic education from Arabic I to Arabic IV under the guidance of Zainul Abideen Azmi in Madrasatul Islah, Sarai Mir, Azamgarh between 1978 (1398 AH) and 1982 (1402 AH).

In 1982 (1402 AH), he enrolled in Darul Uloom Deoband on the advice of Azami and was admitted to Arabic Fifth, and in 1986 (1406 AH), he graduated from there. In 1987, he completed the Ifta course at Darul Uloom Deoband.

His hadith teachers included Naseer Ahmad Khan, Abdul Haq Azmi, Nematullah Azami, Qamaruddin Ahmad Gorakhpuri, Saeed Ahmad Palanpuri, Arshad Madani, Mirajul Haq Deobandi, Muhammad Hussain Bihari, Zubair Ahmad Deobandi, Abdul Khaliq Madrasi, and Riyasat Ali Zafar Bijnori.

He received permission (Ijazah) in Hadith from Yunus Jaunpuri, Ashiq Ilahi Bulandshahri, Zainul Abideen Azmi, and Ahmad Hasan Tonki.

== Career ==
After graduating in 1407 AH, he was appointed as a teacher at Rampur's Madrasa Matla'-ul-Uloom. Between 1988 (1408 AH) and 1996 (1416 AH), he worked as a teacher at Jamia Islamia Reori Talab, Banaras, for about eight years.

In 1996 (1416 AH), he was appointed as a lecturer in the Department of Hadith at Mazahir Uloom Jadeed upon the recommendation of Salman Mazahiri. He served in this role for approximately five years until 2001 (1421 AH).

Since 2001 (1421 AH), he has been serving as a lecturer in the department specializing in Hadith at Darul Uloom Deoband. He has taught the book Introduction to the Science of Hadith for almost twenty years. Currently, he serves as a supervisor and lecturer in the department.

Since 1440 AH (2019), he has also served as a lecturer of Hadith studies in the Darse Nizami curriculum of Darul Uloom Deoband.

He pledged allegiance to Abdul Jabbar Azmi (d. 1989) in 1987 (1407 AH); after his death, he pledged allegiance to Zainul Abidin Azmi in 1411 AH. But later, he came under the spiritual training of Talha Kandhlawi, the son of Muhammad Zakaria Kandhlawi, and was authorized by him in Sufism on Ramadan 29, 1423 AH (5 December 2002).

== Literary works ==
He supervised the following academic and research works:

- Al-Hadith al-Hasan Fī Jami‘ al-Tirmidhi: Dirāsatun Wa Tatbīq (in one volume; 1425 AH)
- Hadith an-Gharīb Fī Jami‘ al-Tirmidhi: Dirāsatun Wa Tatbīq (in two volumes; 1427 AH)
- Hasan-un-Sahīh Fī Jami‘ al-Tirmidhi: Dirāsatun Wa Tatbīq (in three volumes; 1429 AH)

His works included:

- Al-'Arf adh-Dhakiyy Fi Sharh Jami' al-Tirmidhi (an Arabic commentary on Jami' al-Tirmidhi in five volumes, the remaining sixteen volumes of which are under publication.)
- Tahdhīb ad-Durr al-Munaddad Fī Sharh al-Adab al-Mufrad (an Arabic commentary on Al-Bukhari's Al-Adab al-Mufrad in four volumes)
- Muaddamat Ad-Durr al-Munaddad (Introduction to Al-Durr al-Munaddad)
- Hadīth aur Fehm-e-Hadīth
- Al-'Arf al-Fayyāh Fī Sharh Muqaddama Ibn as-Salāh (his lectures on Muqaddimah Ibn al-Salah, compiled by Mushahid al-Islam Amrohi)
- Jawāb ar-Risālah (in which he made a detailed review of the criticism and cross-examination of the Syrian scholar Muhammad Awwamah on the moderate method of ordering the hadiths described in his book Muqadmat Al-Durr al-Munaddad.)
- Ghair Muqallidiyyat: Asbāb-o-Tadāruk
- Fazaail-e-Amaal Par I'terazāt: Ek Usooli Jaizah (in Urdu; translated into Arabic, English, and Bangla).
- Haqīqat-uz-Ziyādah 'Alal-Quran Bi Khabaril Wāhid Wa Isti'rādun 'Ilmiyyun Li Īrādāti Ibn al-Qayyim 'Alal-Hanafiyyah Binā'an 'ala hādhal asl (edited and improved by him)

== See also ==
- List of Deobandis
