= Abu Yahya =

Abu Yahya may refer to:

- Abu Yahya (author) (born 1969), Pakistani writer and novelist.
- Abu Yahya ibn Abd al-Haqq (died c. 1258), Marinid ruler
- Abu Yahya al-Libi (1963–2012), Islamist ideologue and leading high-ranking official within al-Qaeda
- Abdul Rahman Saleem (born c. 1975), British-Iranian Islamic activist
- Zakariya al-Qazwini (1203–1283), Persian physician
- Abu Talib Yahya (951–1033), imam of the Zaydiyyah sect in 1020–1033
- Abu Zakariya Yahya al-Wattasi (died 1448), vizier of the Marinid sultan of Fez, regent and effective strongman ruler of Morocco from 1420 until 1448
- Yaghmurasen Ibn Zyan (1206–1283), founder of the Abdelwadid dynasty
- Abu Zakariya (1203–1249), the founder and first ruler of the Hafsid dynasty in Ifriqiya
- Abu Yahya Muhammad ibn Ali ibn Abi Imran al-Tinmalali, the last Muslim governor of Majorca before its conquest by James I of Aragon in 1229
