= Salma Shaheen =

Pakistani poet, critic and songwriter (born 1954)

Professor Salma Shaheen
- سلمہ شاہین
- Born: 16 April 1954 (age 72); Mardan, Pakistan
- Education: Doctorate
- Alma mater: Women University Mardan
- Occupations: poet; writer; researcher; novelist
- Writing career
- Language: Pashto, Urdu
- Years active: 1900s–present
- Genres: Gazal; Nazm; Novel
- Subjects: Literature; Culture; Social; Tradition
- Notable awards: Tamgha-e-Imtiaz

Salma Shaheen (born 16 April 1954) is a Pakistani poet, fiction writer, and researcher. She is recognized as the first woman novelist in the Pashto language and served as the first female director of the Pashto Academy at the University of Peshawar. Shaheen began her literary career primarily writing poems in Urdu and Pashto. She has written on Pashto language, literature, and culture, particularly focusing on women writers in Khyber Pakhtunkhwa.

== Early life ==
Salma was born on 16 April 1954 in Baghdada town in Mardan, Khyber Pakhtunkhwa. She did her secondary schooling from a government school in 1971, and later attended the Women University Mardan (formerly Government College for Women, Mardan) in 2002 and completed further education, including graduation, and doctor's degree with Modern Pashto poem.

== Career ==
Shaheen was initially involved in writings and started her career during childhood. It is believed she originally began writing when she was studying in eighth standard. Her father played a significant role in her career and encouraged her to earn moral authority for Pakhto women. As a director of Pashto Academy, she restored language regulatory institution in 2011 which was previously merged into a not-known institution called Centre for Pashto language and literature. She is also credited with bringing out 120 Pakhtunwali books on hujra, music, dance and jirga.

=== Literary work ===
As a poet, Shaheen wrote at least 14 books in Urdu and Pashto languages, and as a researcher, she wrote folk songs or a research book on folk music titled "Pashto Tapa", short stories, including "Kanri Auo Aghzi" (Eng: "Stones and Thorns"). Her poetic books include "Za Hum Haghse Wara Way" and "Nawey Sahar" which was originally published in 1982. As a researcher, she has published 42 publications on various topics, including social, culture, tradition and language barriers. Her poetry is focused on Pashto culture, literature, and traditions. She is credited for writing two novels titled "Ka Rana Shawa" and "Kani Au Azghi". She also wrote poems which are recognized one of prominent books which includes "Abasin Da Tarikh", "Muasharati Au Saqafati Asar" and "Awami Sandare". As a writer, she represented Pakistan in numerous countries at literary events such as seminars and conferences and was nominated member of a cultural delegation to China. During her visit to China, she wrote a book titled "Dil Aur Ankhein Cheen Main".

== Publications ==
S.No	Book Name	Description
01	Abaseen Da Tarikh pa Aina Ke	It is a history of the river Indus, published in 1980 by Pashto Academy
02	Roohi Sandari	Language Pashto, published in 1983 by Pashto Academy. Collection, compilation and research on Pashto folk, songs (Tappa)
03	Roohi Sandari, Vol. II	Language Pashto, published in 1983 by Pashto Academy. Collection, compilation and research on Pashto folk, songs (Tappa)
04	Nawai Sahar	Language Pashto, a collection of Poetry
05	The Pakhto Tappa, Muasharati Au Saqafati Asar	An introduction of the Pashtoon Society through a particular poetic form Tappa published in 1985 by Pashto Academy
06	Zah Hum Hagha Si Wara Way	A collection of Pashto Poetry in 1996
07	Ka Ranna Shawa	A novel published in 1998
08	Kani Ao Azghi	Short Stories collection, 2001
09	Dil Or Ankhein Cheen Me	Safar Nama
10	Modern Poems in Pashto	Research
11	Ravail	-- do --
12	Modern Poems in Pashto	-- do --
13	Peshawar City and Tradition	Lok Virsa Project, Islamabad, Pakistan
14	Musical Instrument of Pashtoon	Lok Virsa Project, Islamabad, Pakistan

Research Paper written by Dr Salma Shaheen are following:

Research Papers

S.No	Publication	Journal	Month	Year
01	Da Pakhto Da Bannar Tair	Pashto	November, December	1978
02	Parwaz	Pashto	September	1980
03	Hayat-e-Dard Yow Tanqeed	Pashto, Pashto Academy	December	1980
04	Khushal Khan Da Naswani Hussan Shidai	Pashto, Khushal No.	March, April	1980
05	Da Islam Nomawarii Fatiheen Ao Jarnallan	Pashto	January, February	1980
06	Da Nazmoono Ao Maqaalo Fihrist	Pashto	July, March	1981
07	Da Ghani Palwashai	Pashto, Pashto Academy	December	1983
08	Pa Tappa Ki Da Meni Ao Badi Dardoona Ao Takorona	Pashto	October	1984
09	Da Pakhtano Da Ulasi Zound Paltana Da Tapai Ra Ranna Ki	Pashto	April	1984
10	Da Tapai Painandgalo	Pashto	January, February	1984
11	Sur-Ara Zama Pa Nazar Ki	Pashto Aatiraf No.	----	1988
12	Pukhto Rasmul Khat Ta Yowa Sar-Sare Kattana	Pashto Seminar	October	1991, 1992
13	Pa Pakhto Tappa Ki Muasharati Nafsiyat	Pashto	May, August	1993, 1995
14	Da Zaitoon Bano Fun Au Shakhsiyath	Pashto	November, December	1995
15	Tappa Au Ulasi Zound	-----	-----	1995, 1996
16	Adab Saqafat Au Jamhooriat	University Journal	-----	1996, 1997
17	Shaere Ghani	Pashto	April	1997
18	Pukhto Academy ki Pa Ulasi Adab Shwee Karoona	University Journal	-----	1998, 1999
19	Pakistani Khawateen Aur Pashto Adab	Pakistan Academy of Letters Adbiat	-----	2001
20	Alama Iqbal Aur Iqiswee Sadi	-----	-----	2002
21	Study of women in Pashtoon Society	-----	-----	2002
22	Badalti hoi Dunia mai Adab ka Kirdar	Pakistan Academy of Letters Adbiat	February	2005
23	Akeshwein Saddi, Pakistani Zubano ka mustaqbil	-----	August	2005
24	Pakistani Saqafat Aalmi Tanazur main	-----	August	2005
25	Allama Iqbal aur Akeshwein Saddi	-----	-----	
26	Improvement in the Quality of Life in the N.W.F.P in the future	Pashto	October – December	2008
27	Khawateen ki Haqooq Pashtoon Saqafat ki Roshni main	-----	March	2009
28	Pashtoon Khawateen Nasar Nigar	Allama Iqbal Open University, Islamabad	March	2009
29	Ajmal Khattak & Modern Poem	Pashto	October – December	2010
30	The Secrets of the Afghans (Eighteenth Century)	Pashto	October, June	2011, 2012
31	Qambar Ali Khan Orakzai (An elegy and ghazal poet of the southern district)	Pashto	October, June	2011, 2012

== Awards ==
Shaheen is the receipt of numerous awards for her contribution to Pashto literature, social, culture and tradition. Her awards include Abasin Art Council Award, Pakistan Culture Association Award, Pakistan Academy of Letters Hijra and Tamgha-e-Imtiaz which was conferred by the government of Pakistan in 2009.
