= Sadruddin Islahi =

- Born: Sadruddin Islahi; 1917; Azamgarh district, Uttar Pradesh, British India
- Died: 13 November 1998 (aged 80–81)
- Occupation: Islamic scholar / author
- Years active: 1944 - 1998

Sadruddin Islahi (1917 - 1998) was an Indian Islamic Urdu writer and a close companion of Abul A'la Maududi. He was one of the early members of Jamat e Islami.

== Early life and education ==
Islahi was born in 1917 in Sidha Sultanpur, Azamgarh district, Uttar Pradesh, British India. After early school education, he went to an Islamic school, Madrasatul Islah, to get a degree in religious education in 1937.

== Membership of Jamat e Islami ==
Islahi joined Jamat-e-Islami in its early days and remained an active member until his death. He corresponded with Abul A'la Maududi who was mentoring him as a writer.

== Writing career ==
After completing his education, Islahi started writing articles for different journals. He was also published in the Islamic journal, Tarjuman ul Quran, Hyderabad. When Jamaat-e-Islami Hind asked Abul A'la Maududi to grant his permission for a condensed publication of Tafhim-ul-Quran, he gave his consent only if it was to be done by Sadruddin Islahi.

== Books ==
- Haqiqat-e-Nifaq (1944)
- Ifadat-e-hazrat shah waliullah dehlvi (Translation) (1944)
- Haqeeqat-e-Ubudiyat (1946)
- Islam Ek Nazar Mein (Islam at a Glance) (1961)
- Asase Deen ki Tameer (Building up the foundations of faith) (1969)
- Maaraka-e-islam-o-jahiliyat (1991)
- Islam Aur Ijtimaiyat (Islam And Collectivism)
- Quran Majeed Ka Ta'aruf
- Fareeza Iqamat-e-Deen
- Tahreek-e-Islami Hind (Jamat-e-Islami Hind Conceptual Basis)

== Death ==
Islahi died on November 13, 1998, in Azamgarh district, Uttar Pradesh.
