= Muntasir Mir =

Pakistani Islamic studies scholar

Muntasir Mir is a Pakistani Islamic studies scholar and University Professor of Islamic Studies at Youngstown State University.

== Biography ==
Mir obtained his PhD from the University of Michigan and has taught at various institutions, including colleges in Lahore, the University of Michigan, the International Islamic University in Malaysia, and later, Youngstown State University.

== Selected works ==
- Coherence in the Qurʼān (1986)
- Dictionary of Qur'anic Terms and Concepts (1987)
- Verbal idioms of the Qur'ān (1989)
- Understanding the Islamic Scripture (2008)
- Iqbal – Poet and Thinker (2020)

== See also ==
- Amin Ahsan Islahi
- Hamiduddin Farahi
