= Abu Yahya (author) =

Pakistani author

Abu Yahya ابو یحییٰ
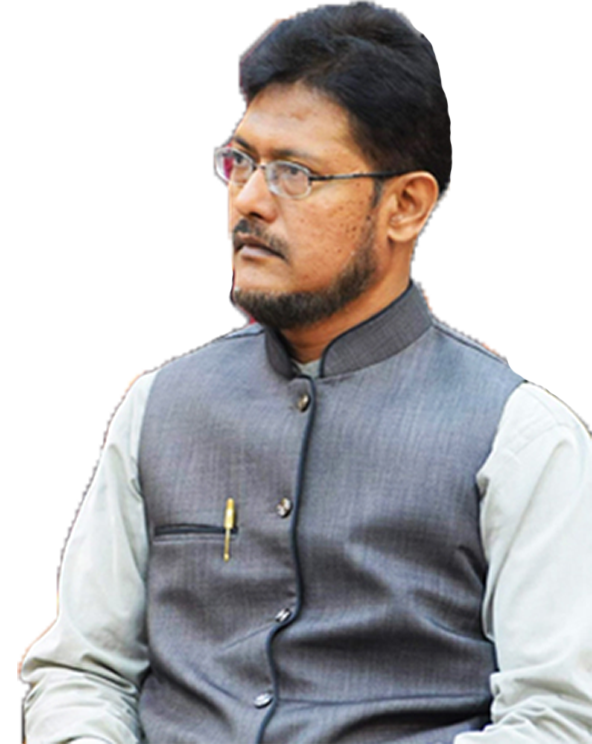
- Abu Yahya a.k.a. Rehan Ahmed Yousufi
- Born: Rehan Ahmed; 22 September 1969 (age 57); Karachi, Sindh, Pakistan
- Education: University of Karachi (Hons. and Masters); Hamdard University (M.Phil. Ph.D)
- Occupations: Scholar; Novelist; Writer
- Writing career
- Years active: 2002 - present
- Notable works: Jab Zindagi Shuru Hogi (When Life Begins); Qasam Us Waqt Ki; Quran Ka Matloob Insaan
- Website: www.inzaar.pk

Abu Yahya (Urdu: ابو یحییٰ; born 22 September 1969) a.k.a. Rehan Ahmed Yousufi is a Pakistani scholar, writer and novelist. His work mainly focuses on faith and morality, Islamic philosophy and Quran exegesis. He is presenting the Quranic teachings in novel form. He is influenced by Ahmed Raza Khan Barelvi, Ashraf Ali Thanwi, Abul A'la Maududi, Syed Abul Hassan Ali Nadvi, Amin Ahsan Islahi, Dr. Israr Ahmed, Wahiduddin Khan and Javed Ahmad Ghamidi.

== Education ==
Abu Yahya did his Bachelors (Hons) and Masters in Islamic Studies and Computer Technology with First class First from Sheikh Zayed Islamic Centre, University of Karachi, Karachi whereas he has also completed M.Phil. in Social Sciences. He has completed his PhD in Islamic Studies. His Ph.D. thesis was on the topic of ‘Evolution of Dawah Methodology Literature in 20th Century Subcontinent’

== Career ==
Abu Yahya started his career as an IT professional. After completing his education he worked in Saudi Arabia and Canada. In 2001 he came back to Pakistan and started his Da'wah work. He has also been active in preaching social reform through television programs, newspaper articles, and public gatherings. Initially, he associated himself with “Danish Sara Pakistan;” then in 2008 as an associate fellow, he worked for Al-Mawrid; in 2009 in the suburbs of Karachi he established a spiritual retreat (Training Center) for the reformation and moral education of the people. In 2013 Inzaar Institution was established for the above-mentioned purposes. He is also an editor of the monthly magazine bearing the same name that is Inzaar.

== Books ==
Abu Yahya wrote many books, novels and travelogues. His prominent books besides “Jab Zindagi Shuru Hogi” are “Qasam Us Waqt Ki”, “Aakhri Jang”, Khuda Bol Raha Hai”, "Adhuri Kahani", “Quran Ka Matloob Insaan”, “Bus Yehi Dil”, “Hadees e Dil” and “Wohi Rehguzar”. His other books include travelogues, “Khol Ankh Zameen Dekh”, “Sair-e-Natamaam” and "Wohi Rahguzar" based on his travelling to various countries including, Australia, Turkey, Singapore, Thailand, Malaysia, Sri Lanka, Saudi Arabia, Canada and USA.

=== Novels ===
- Jab Zindagi Shuru Hogi (جب زندگی شروع ہوگی) (When Life Begins) – Part 1 (This book has been translated in many local and foreign languages including English, Hindi, Bangla, Pashto and Sindhi)
- Qasam Us Waqt Ki (قسم اُس وقت کی) (Testimony of Time) - Part 2
- Akhri Jang (آخری جنگ) (The Last War) - Part 3
- Khuda Bol Raha Hai (خُدا بول رہا ہے) (God is Speaking) - Part 4
- Adhuri Kahani (ادھوری کہانی) (The Incomplete Story) - Part 5

=== Travelogues ===
- Sair-e-Natamaam (سیر ناتمام) (The Unfinished Visit)
- Khol Ankh Zameen Dekh (کھول آنکھ زمین دیکھ) (Open your eyes, Look at the World)
- Wohi Rehguzar (وہی راہ گزر) (The Same Path)

=== Others books ===
- Quran Ka Matloob Insaan (قرآن کا مطلوب انسان) (The human wanted by the Quran)
- Bas Yahi Dil (بس یہی دل) (Only such a Heart)
- Hadees-e-Dil (حدیثِ دل) (Words of a Heart)
- Mulaqaat (مُلاقات) (The Meeting)
- Teesri Roshni (تیسری روشنی) (The Third Light) (Reply on the criticism of Jab Zindagi Shuru Hogi)
- Hikmat Ki Batein (حکمت کی باتیں) (Words of Wisdom) (A books on selected quotations)
- Mazameen-e-Quran (مضامين قرآن) (The Essays in Quran) (about topics of Quran - under progress)

== Projects ==
1. Quran Ka Matloob Insaan
2. Wajood-e-Bari Talah (Evidences on existence of Almightly)
3. Aakhirat Kay Dalael (Evidences of Life Hereafter)
4. Aakhirat Ki Zindagi (The Hereafter Life)
5. Evidences of “Tauheed (Oneness of God)”
6. Evidences of “Risalat (Prophethood)”
7. Course on Fasting
8. Stress Management
9. Course on “Shariat” (Planned)
