= Nematullah Azami =

Indian Islamic hadith scholar (b. 1936 AD)

Bahr al-Uloom, Maulana Nematullah Azami

President Islamic Fiqh Academy, India
- Incumbent
- Assumed office 30 May 2011
- Preceded by: Zafeeruddin Miftahi

Personal life
- Born: 24 December 1936 (age 89) Pura Maroof, then Azamgarh district, United Provinces of Agra and Oudh, British India (now Mau district, Uttar Pradesh, India)
- Main interest(s): Hadith, Fiqh, Biographical evaluation

Religious life
- Religion: Islam
- School: Isha'atul Uloom Pura Maroof; Darul Uloom Deoband

Muslim leader
- Teacher: Hussain Ahmad Madani; Izaz Ali Amrohi; Ibrahim Balyawi
- Students: Abdullah Maroofi; Salman Mansoorpuri; Salman Bijnori; Ishtiaque Ahmad Qasmi; Yasir Nadeem al Wajidi

Nematullah Azami (born 24 December 1936), also written as Nematullah Azmi and Ni'matullah Azami, is an Indian Islamic hadith scholar, a commentator on the Quran (mufassir), and a faqīh (Islamic jurist). He is the president of India's Islamic Fiqh Academy. He has also been serving as a senior lecturer at Darul Uloom Deoband for forty years.

== Early life and education ==
Nematullah Azami was born on 24 December 1936, in Pura Maroof (Kurthi Jafarpur), Azamgarh District, United Provinces of British India (now Mau District, Uttar Pradesh).

Azami received his primary education at Madrasa Isha'atul Uloom Pura Maroof, where he studied Arabic language and pursued courses up to Sullam al-Uloom, under the supervision of his elder brother, Amanatullah Azami.

After that, he enrolled in Darul Uloom Deoband and graduated from the Hadith course in 1953 (1372 AH). He continued there for another year or two after graduation, spending time on various subjects. At the Deoband seminary, his teachers included Hussain Ahmad Madani, Izaz Ali Amrohi and Ibrahim Balyawi. His classmates included Anzar Shah Kashmiri and Qazi Mujahidul Islam Qasmi.

== Career ==
After graduation, Azami was a teacher for two years at Darul Uloom Hussainia, Tawli, Muzaffarnagar district, then taught Sahih al-Tirmidhi and Sahih al-Bukhari for a few years in Damaipur, Malda, West Bengal. After that, he did teaching services in various madrasas like Jāmi'at-ur-Rashād Azamgarh, Misbah-ul-Uloom Kopaganj, Miftah-ul-Uloom Mau, and Mazhar-ul-Uloom Banaras. On the invitation of Habib al-Rahman al-A'zami, he served for a few years in Miftah-ul-Uloom, Mau, as Sheikh al-Hadith. He also provided teaching services in some madrasas in Assam and Gujarat.

In 1982 (1402 AH), on the invitation of Wahiduzzaman Kairanawi, he came to Darul Uloom Deoband where he was appointed as a senior teacher. He has taught books like Mebzi, Tafsir al-Baydawi, Musāmarah, Muwatta Imam Malik, Sunan Abu Dawood, and Sahih Muslim at Darul Uloom Deoband, and currently the teaching of the first volume of Jami al-Tirmidhi is related to him.

After Saeed Ahmad Palanpuri, his name was suggested for the post of Sheikh al-Hadith and Principal of Darul Uloom Deoband, which he declined. He is known by the title "Bahrul Uloom" (transl. The Ocean of Knowledge) due to his meticulous and extensive study of Hadith, biographical evaluation (ʿIlm al-rijāl), Christianity, and Judaism.

In the meeting of the governing body of Darul Uloom Deoband held on Safar 1421 AH, on the advice of Asad Madani, the proposal to establish a "Department of Specialization in Hadith" in Darul Uloom Deoband was approved, and Azami was appointed as its patron.

He was appointed as president of the Islamic Fiqh Academy on 30 May 2011, succeeding Zafeeruddin Miftahi.

He is convinced of the necessity of ijtihad in religious matters.

In March 2019, Islamic jurists, including Azami, stated the Sukanya Samriddhi Yojana (SSY), a scheme launched by the Indian government, is "illegal" according to Islamic Shari'a because it contains interest as a part.

== Literary works ==
Under the supervision of Azami, from the Department of Specialization in Hadith of Darul Uloom Deoband, on the various terms of Jami al-Tirmidhi, some research books have been published in several volumes under the names of Al-Hadith al-Hasan Fī Jami‘ al-Tirmidhi, Hasan an-Gharīb Fī Jami‘ al-Tirmidhi, and Hadith an-Gharīb Fī Jami‘ al-Tirmidhi.

He has done the work of commenting on the book Al-Ilzāmāt by Al-Daraqutni. His works include:

- Ni'm al-Bayān fī Tarjama al-Quran (a exegesis of the Quran)
- Dars-e-Bukhari (compilation of the lectures of his teacher Hussain Ahmad Madani on Sahih al-Bukhari)
- Ni'mat al-Mun'im (an Urdu commentary on Sahih Muslim in two volumes)
- Taqrīb Sharḥ Maʿāni al-Āthār (5 volumes; translated also into English by Habib Bewley under the title Sharḥ Maʿāni al-Āthār: Explanation of the Meanings of the Traditions)
- Al-Fawāid al-Muhimma Fī Dirāsat al-Mutūn wa Mukhtalaf al-Hadīth (important benefits of studying texts and different hadiths)
- Madāris ar-Ruwāt wa Mashāhīr-u-Asātizatihā Ma'a Talāmidhatihim wa Tabaqātihim (Schools of Hadith narrators and their famous teachers, along with their students and their generations)
- īsāiyat; Injīl Ki Roshni Mein (A Study of Christianity in the Light of the Gospel)
- Dirāsat u Tatbīq al-Amthilah Li ‘Anwā‘ al-ahadīth al-mukhtalifah (Study the application of examples to different types of hadiths)
- Dirāsat al-Hadith as-Sahīh wa al-Hasan wa Aqsāmuha wa Fikratu Ibn as-Salah wa Dirāsat u Miqyās-i-Ma'rifat-i-Rijāl al-Hasan Li Zātih (in Arabic; studying the authentic hadith and the good hadith and their divisions, the idea of Ibn al-Salah, and studying the standard of knowledge of the men of the good hadith in and of itself.)
- Al-Ahādīth al-Mukhtārah Li al-Hifz Li Qism at-Takhassus Fi al-Hadīth (in Arabic; Hadiths selected for memorization for the Department of Specialization in Hadith)
- Tashīl al-Usool (in Arabic; a book co-authored with Riyasat Ali Zafar Bijnori on the Principles of Islamic Jurisprudence)
- Hazrat Imām Abu Hanīfa Par Irja’ Ki Tuhmat, a rejection of the accusation of postponement (’Irja’) against Abu Hanifa
- Fuqaha‘ as-Sahāba (Islamic jurists from the Companions of the Prophet)
- Hadīth e Jassāsah (A response to the refutation of Hadith Al-Jassasah about Dajjal)
- Allah Par Imān Kiya Hai? (in Urdu; What is the definition of faith in Allah?)

== See also ==
- List of Deobandis
