= University of Swat =

Public sector university in Pakistan

University of Swat یونیورسٹی آف سوات د سوات پوهنتون
- Former name: Islamic University of Swat
- Motto: مطابقت کے ساتھ معیاری تعلیم کے لئے خواہشمند
- Motto in English: Aspiring for Quality Education with Relevance
- Type: Public
- Established: 7 July 2010
- Affiliations: Colleges in Districts Swat
- Academic affiliations: HEC, PEC
- Chancellor: Chief Minister of Khyber Pakhtunkhwa
- Vice-Chancellor: Prof. Dr. Muhammad Qasim
- Academic staff: 350
- Students: 8,000+
- Other students: 15,00+ (private)
- Location: Swat, Khyber-Pakhtunkhwa, Pakistan; 34.855°N 72.455°E
- Campus: Charbagh, Alabad; Charbagh Campus
- Colours: Antique Ruby, British Racing Green
- Nicknames: USWAT, Swat University
- Website: www.uswat.edu.pk

The University of Swat (Urdu: یونیورسٹی آف سوات) (Pashto: د سوات پوهنتون) is a public university. The main campus of the university is situated in the Charbagh area of the Swat District in the Khyber Pakhtunkhwa province of Pakistan. It is about 20 km away from the main city of Mingora.

== History ==
On 29 May, 2010, the Hon'ble Prime Minister of Pakistan, during his visit to the Swat valley, announced to establish the University of Swat. The university came into formal existence in July, 2010 by the order of Honorable Governor of Khyber Pakhtunkhwa Mr. Awais Ahmad Ghani with the prior approval of the President of Pakistan. Muhammad Farooq Khan (Shaheed) was appointed as its first Vice Chancellor in August 2010. The Higher Education Department handed over two buildings to the university located at Saidu Sharif Swat.

Land acquisition for the university's own campus has been carried out and construction on the project is ongoing. Various buildings have been completed and recently the two departments have been shifted to the main campus under the supervision of Muhammad Jamal, the Vice Chancellor.

The university opened seven departments in its first academic session (2010–11).

== Vice chancellors ==
- Prof. Dr. Husnul Amin - 04 October, 2026 till date
- Prof. Dr. Muhammad Qasim (Acting) - June 03, 2026 to 04 October, 2026
- Prof. Dr. Hassan Sher - 07 October 2022 to June 02, 2026
- Prof. Dr. Hassan Sher (Acting) - 18 December 2021 to 07 October 2022.
- Prof. Dr. Muhammad Jamal Khan – 20 Dec 2017 to 18 December 2022
- Prof. Dr. Jehan Bakht (Acting) – 7 Dec 2015 to Jun 9, 2017
- Prof. Dr. Muhammad Jahanzeb Khan Yousafzai – 03 December 2011 to 02 Dec 2015
- Prof. Dr. Muhammad Farooq Swati (Acting) 03 December 2011
- Muhammad Farooq Khan

== Pro Vice chancellors ==
- Prof. Dr. Muhammad Qasim
- Prof. Dr. Hassan Sher

== Registrar ==
- Dr. Arshad Ali Khan - 03 June 2026 till date
- Fayyaz Ahmed Khan - 08 May 2025 to 03 June 2026
- Imtiaz Ali - 18 October 2022 to 08 May 2025
- Muhammad Riaz - 06 January 2022 to 17 October 2022
- Mahboob Ur Rahman - 14 February 2019 to 06 January 2022
- Zahid Ullah - 01 March 2018 to 14 February 2022
- Dr. Hassan Sher - 17 March 2016 to 28 February 2018
- Mahboob Ur Rahman - 24 January 2012 to 16 March 2016
- Sher Alam Khan - 28 September 2010 to 07 November 2011

== Teaching Units ==
Main Campus

1. Department of English and Foreign Languages
2. Department of Islamic and Arabic Studies
3. Department of Pashto
4. Department of Law & Sharia’h
5. Department of Urdu
6. Department of Physics
7. Department of Computer and Software Technology
8. Department of Mathematics & Statistics
9. Department of Geology
10. Department of Economics and Development Studies
11. Department of Archaeology
12. Department of Tourism and Hospitality
13. Department of Management & Commerce
14. Department of Pakistan Studies
15. Department of Media & Communication Studies
16. Department of Social and Gender Studies
17. Department of Psychological Studies
18. Center for Education and Staff Training
19. Department of Environmental and Conservation Sciences
20. Department of Chemistry
21. Department of Zoology
22. Department of Agricultural Sciences and Forestry
23. Department of Botany
24. Department for Biotechnology, Microbiology and Forensic Science
25. Allied Health Sciences
26. Hunerkada

Women Campus

1. Department of Zoology WC
2. Department of Botany WC
3. Department of Psychological Studies
4. Department of Home Economics
5. Department of Computer and Software Technology
6. Department of English and Foreign Languages

== Administrative Units ==
1. Office of the Vice Chancellor
2. Office of the Pro Vice Chancellor
3. Office of the Registrar
4. Office of the Controller of Examinations
5. Office of Research, Innovation and commercialization (ORIC)
6. Central Library
7. Office of the Treasurer
8. Office of the Provost
9. Directorate Of Planning and Development
10. Directorate of Administration
11. Directorate of IT
12. Directorate of Works
13. Directorate of Admission
14. Quality Enhancement Cell
15. Financial Aid Office
16. Directorate of Advanced Studies and Research Board
17. Office of the Public Relation Officer
18. Proctorial Board
19. Youth Development Centre (YDC)
20. University of Swat Alumni Association (UOSAA)

== Ranking ==
In Pakistan the university was ranked 70th according to the Higher Education Commission of Pakistan in 2023.

== Course levels and areas of studies ==
Certificate Diplomas
Associate degrees
Bachelor's degrees
Master's degrees
M.Phil degrees
Doctorate degrees

== Books ==
Books Related to the University of Swat:

- Kashmir Issue (Urdu & English), by Former Vice Chancellor University of Swat Muhammad Farooq Khan(late).
- Dialogue with the West (English), by Former Vice Chancellor University of Swat Muhammad Farooq Khan(late).
- Hidden Treasures of Swat (2014), by Dildar Ali Khan (Student at Institute of Cultural Heritage, Tourism and Hospitality Management) University of Swat.
