= Hamid al-Din Farahi =

Indian scholar in Islamic studies

Hamiduddin Farahi

Personal life
- Born: 18 November 1863 Phariha, Azamgarh District, North-Western Provinces, British India
- Died: 11 November 1930 (aged 66) Mathura, United Provinces, British India
- Era: Modern era 20th century
- Region: Indian subcontinent
- Main interest: Quran
- Notable work(s): Mufradat al Quran ("Vocabulary of the Quran") Asalib al Quran ("Style of the Quran") Jamhara-tul-Balaghah ("Manual of Quranic Rhetoric") Im'an Fi Aqsam al-Qur'an (A Study of the Qur'anic Oaths)] Nizam al-Qur'an (Nazm or Coherence in the Qur'an - a commentary on the Qur'an, Introduction)
- Education: Aligarh Muslim University
- Occupation: Linguist, Shaykh al-Islām

Religious life
- Religion: Islam
- Denomination: Sunni
- Movement: Modernism

Muslim leader
- Influenced by: Shibli Nomani
- Influenced: Khalid Masud; Javed Ahmad Ghamidi; Israr Ahmed; Muhammad Farooq Khan; Amin Ahsan Islahi; Abul Kalam Azad; Abul A'la Maududi; Mohammad Akram Nadwi; Nouman Ali Khan

Hamiduddin Farahi (18 November 1863 – 11 November 1930) was an Indian Islamic scholar known for his work on the concept of nazm, or coherence, in the Quran. The modernist Farahi school is named after him.

He was instrumental in producing scholarly work on the theory that the verses of the Quran are interconnected in such a way that each surah, or chapter, of the Quran forms a coherent structure, having its own central theme, which he called umood. He also started writing his own exegesis, or tafsir of the Quran which was left incomplete on his death in 1930. The muqaddimah, or introduction to this is an important work on the theory of Nazm-ul-Quran.

== Early life and family ==
Farahi was born in Phariya (hence the name "Farahi"), a village in the district of Azamgarh district, Uttar Pradesh, India. He was the son of Abdul Kareem Sheikh and Muqeema Bibi, and the brother of Rasheeduddin Sheikh. He was a cousin of the famous theologian and historian Shibli Nomani, from whom he learned Arabic. He was taught Persian from Maulvi Mehdi Husain of Chitara (Azamgarh). He travelled to Lahore to study Arabic literature from Faizul Hasan Saharaupuri, who was considered a master at that time in this field. At the age of twenty-one, he was admitted to the Aligarh Muslim University to study the modern disciplines of knowledge. He was recommended by Syed Ahmad Khan, founder of Aligarh Muslim University. Sir Syed wrote that he was sending someone who knew more Arabic and Persian than the professors of the college. While studying at the college, Farahi translated parts of At-Tabaqat-ul-Kubra of Ibn Shihab al-Zuhri (784 – 845 AD) into Persian. The translation was later included in the college syllabus. Farahi eventually graduated from MAO College.

== Teaching career ==
After finishing his studies, Farahi taught Arabic at various institutions, including Sindh Madressatul Islam College, Karachi, (from 1897 to 1906), Muhammadan Anglo-Oriental College (MAO) and Darul Uloom, Hyderabad. While at MAO, he learnt Hebrew from the German Orientalist and Professor of Arabic Josef Horovitz (1874 – 1931). During his stay in Hyderabad, Farahi conceived the idea of establishing a university where all religious and modern sciences would be taught in Urdu. The scheme he prepared for this purpose later materialised in the form of Jamiah Uthmaniyyah or Osmania University, Hyderabad. He subsequently went to Sara-e-Mir, a town in Azamgarh, where he took charge of the Madrasatul Islah (School for Reform), an institution based on the educational ideas of Shibli Nomani and Farahi. Farahi had served as chief administrator of the school since its inception, but other engagements kept him away from becoming actively involved in its affairs. From 1925, when he came to Sara-e-Mir, to 1930, the year of his death, Farahi devoted most of his time and energy to managing the affairs of the Madrasa-tul-Islah and teaching there. A few students – Amin Ahsan Islahi was one of them — received special training from him and later became the bearer of his torch.

== Theory of Quran ==
For almost fifty years, Farahi reflected over the Quran, which remained his chief interest and the focal point of all his writings. His greatest contribution in its study is his discovery of coherence in the Quran. He has achieved the impossible, remarked Shibli Nomani while praising his student's grand achievement. It is considered a super human accomplishment, Farahi demonstrated to all the western critics that with a sound understanding of the Arabic language, one can appreciate the coherence in the Quran which is certainly not a haphazard collection of injunctions. By taking into consideration, the three constituents of nazm (coherence): order, proportion and unity, he proved that a single interpretation of the Quran was possible. This alone was a far-reaching consequence of the principle of Quranic nazm. Serious differences in the interpretation of the Quran which have given rise to the menace of religious sectarianism are actually the result of disregarding thematic and structural coherence in the arrangement and mutual relationship of various Quranic verses and paragraphs. Each sect has adopted its interpretation because isolating a verse from its context can associate multiple meanings to it. It is only the coherence of the Qur'an, which if considered leads to a definite and integrated understanding of the 'Divine Message'. It is only then that the Qur'an can be truly regarded as a Mizan (Balance of Justice) and a Furqan (Distinguisher of Good and Evil). It is only then that the Quranic verse: Hold fast to the Cable of Allah and be not divided’ (3:103), can become a manifest reality and the unity in the Muslim Ummah be achieved. Farahi went on to enunciate certain principles necessary to understand and interpret the Quran. The foremost among them was the principle of coherence. He was able to show that unless the Quran is understood through a holistic approach a lot of its treasure of wisdom remains hidden.

== Recognition of his work ==
Several Islamic scholars of South Asia have acknowledged his contribution to Islamic thought and learning.

Abul A'la Maududi wrote, "It has been generally accepted that in recent times, very few have reached the position Allama Farahi has been blessed with by the Almighty as far as deliberation on the Qur'an is concerned. He has spent the major portion of his life pondering on the meanings of this Book, and has written such a masterful commentary on the Qur'an that it is difficult to find its parallel even in the early period..."

Shibli Nomani wrote, "It is generally believed that a talented person can in no way remain unknown to the world. Experience as well as history bear testimony to this. However, each rule has an exception. Maulvi Hameed Uddin ... is a good example of such an exception ... In this age, his treatise "Tafseer Nizaam-ul-Quran" is as essential and beneficial to Muslims as pure water is to the thirsty and exhausted."

Sulaiman Nadvi wrote, " ... The Ibn Taymiyya of this age has died on 11 November 1930 --- someone whose brilliance is very unlikely to be surpassed now and whose comprehensive command of oriental and occidental disciplines is a miracle of this era. A profound scholar of the Qur'an ... a unique personality ... an embodiment of piety ... an unfathomable sea of knowledge ... an institution within himself ... a literary genius ... a researcher of prodigious intellect ... It is a matter of great sorrow that such a brilliant personality graced the world and then perished, but the world could not recognise its grandeur ... "

Manazir Ahsan Gilani wrote, " ... the revivalist movement launched by Shah Wali Ullah [in the eighteenth century], in recent years has drawn inspiration from "Tafseer Nizaam-ul-Qur'an" the work of a distinguished scholar, Maulana Hameed Uddin Farahi. Among other features of this commentary (i.e. relationship between the Qur'an and the Bible, and various literary discussions), its salient feature is the unprecedented attempt in it to bring out the coherence between the verses. It is this coherence which sometimes provides enough evidence that the Qur'an is a Divine Book."

Abdul Majid Daryabadi wrote, "In this age, Allama Hameed Uddin Farahi is the most outstanding personality as far as Qur'anic Studies are concerned. He not only occupies a distinguished position among the scholars of recent times, but, in fact, has discovered some new principles for the interpretation of the Qur'an. The foremost among them is his philosophy of coherence in the Qur'an."

Javed Ahmad Ghamidi wrote, "The greatest favour that Imam Farahi has done to the Muslim ummah is that he has restored this status with utmost eminence. The manner in which he understood the Qur'an, the manner in which he taught how to teach it, the way in which he compiled its fields of knowledge and the extent to which he reached into the depths of its verses and explained who they address and how, and how the Qur'an elaborates on its decisions create the basis for a firm foundation for the establishment of the governance of the Qur'an: the final verdict; the balance through which it explains what is acceptable in religion and in the guidance from God, and what is unacceptable. I consider Imam Farahi to be one of God's signs for this world."

== Works ==
Most of Farahi's work is in Arabic. Farahi's chief scholarly interest was the Quran, the focal point of all his writings. Most of his published works are in the form of notes that were later compiled by his followers such Maulana Amin Ahsan Islahi and Allama Khalid Masud and others. Some of the books he wrote are:

- Majmua' Tafseer-e-Farahi (Collection of Tafsir-e-Farahi)
- Mufradat al-Quran ("Vocabulary of the Quran")
- Asalib al-Quran ("Style of the Quran")
- Jamhara-tul-Balaghah ("Manual of Quranic Rhetoric")
- Im'an Fi Aqsam al-Qur'an (A Study of the Qur'anic Oaths)
- ‘في من هو الذبيح’ (Fi man huwa al-Dhabih: Which of Abraham's son was Sacrificed?)
- Nizam al-Qur'an (Coherence in the Qur'an), a commentary on the Qur'an, Introduction
- "Urdu translation of Last 40 Chapters of Quran". 21 July 2020.
- "Complementing principles of interpretation". 21 July 2020.

== Death and legacy ==
Hamiduddin Farahi died on 11 November 1930 at Mathura, UP, British India at age 66.

== See also ==
- Amin Ahsan Islahi
- Khalid Masud
- Javed Ahmed Ghamidi
- Tafhim-ul-Quran
- Tadabbur-i-Qur'an
- Muntasir Mir
