= Sarai Mir =

Town in Azamgarh, Uttar Pradesh, India

Sarai Mir Saraimeer
- Town
- Location in Uttar Pradesh, India Sarai Mir (India)
- Coordinates: 26°01′N 82°55′E
- Country: India
- State: Uttar Pradesh
- District: Azamgarh

Government
  - Chairman: Wasim Ahmed

Population (2011)
  - Total: 19,055

Language
  - Official: Hindi
  - Additional official: Urdu
- Time zone: UTC+5:30 (IST)
- Postal code: 276305

Sarai Mir is a town and a nagar panchayat in Azamgarh district in the Indian state of Uttar Pradesh.

== Demographics ==
As per the 2011 Indian Census, Sarai Mir had a total population of 19,055, of which 9,760 were males and 9,295 were females. Population within the age group of 0 to 6 years was 3,040. The total number of literates in Sarai Mir was 13,151, which constituted 69.0% of the population with male literacy of 72.8% and female literacy of 65.1%. The effective literacy rate of 7+ population of Sarai Mir was 82.1%, of which male literacy rate was 86.6% and female literacy rate was 77.4%. The Scheduled Castes and Scheduled Tribes population was 2,740 and 13 respectively. Sarai Mir had 2,384 households in 2011.

As of 2001 India census, Saraimir had a population of 15,526. Males constitute 51% of the population and females 49%. Saraimir has an average literacy rate of 58%, lower than the national average of 59.5%: male literacy is 64%, and female literacy is 52%. In Saraimir, 21% of the population is under 6 years of age.

=== Religion ===
Religions in Sarai Mir
Religion	Percent
Muslims	52.0%
Hindus	47.7%
Others	0.3%
Distribution of religions

Islam is followed by a little more than half of the population, while almost all of the remaining population follow Hinduism.

== Education ==
- Madrasatul Islah, a traditional Islamic institution of learning found in 1908
