= Farahi school =

Sunni Islamic school of thought

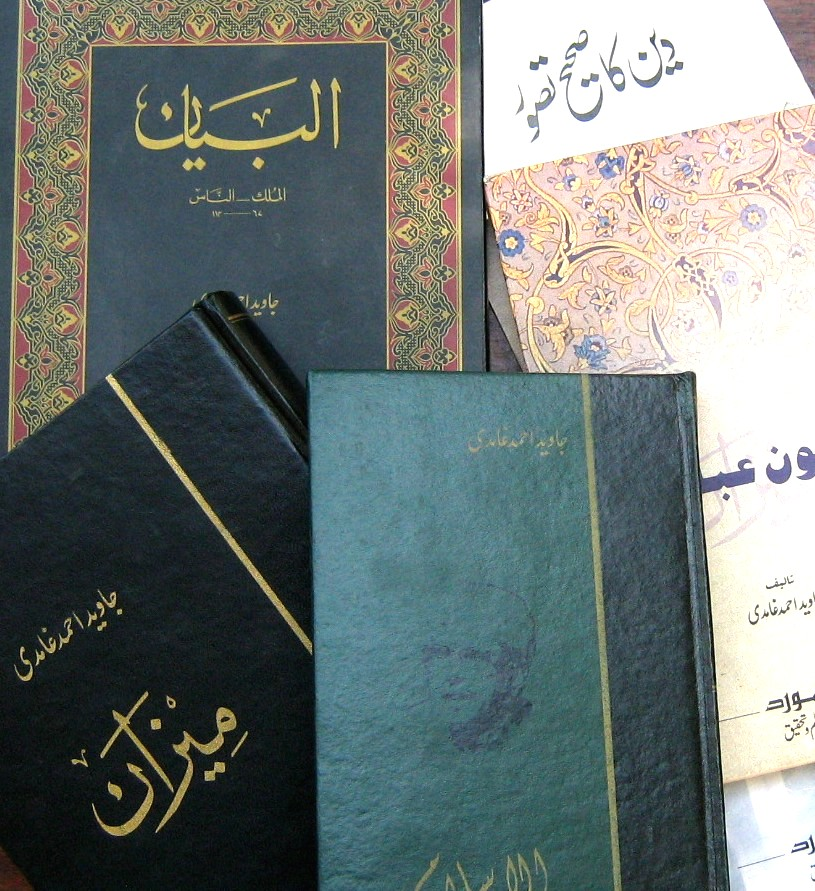
Some of the works of Ghamidi.

The Farahi school (Urdu: فراہی مکتبۂ فکر) is a modern school of Islamic thought and Qur'anic exegesis within Sunni Islam that originated on the Indian subcontinent. The school is named after Hamiduddin Farahi (1863–1930), a maternal cousin and student of the Indian Sunni Hanafi scholar Shibli Nomani, and was further developed by his pupil Amin Ahsan Islahi (1904–1997) and later by Javed Ahmad Ghamidi (born 1951).

The school is best known, firstly, for the theory of nazm ("coherence") which holds that each chapter of the Qur'an is a structured unity organised around a central theme, and secondly, for treating the Qur'an as the final criterion against which all other religious sources must be judged, including the Hadith. Its reformist conclusions on questions such as stoning, apostasy, the hijab, and the return of Jesus diverge from traditional Sunni positions and have drawn criticism from conservative Ulama.

Unlike other schools of Islamic thought which focus more on the practice of Taqlid, the Farahi school places greater emphasis on the individual's own reasoning (Ijtihad), seeking to address modern issues within a paradigm grounded in reason and revelation.

== Principal figures ==
=== Hamiduddin Farahi ===
Hamiduddin Farahi was born in 1863 in the village of Phariha, Azamgarh district, in what is now Uttar Pradesh, India and was a maternal cousin of the theologian and historian Shibli Nomani, with whom he studied Arabic. After traditional studies in Arabic, Persian, and the Islamic sciences, he entered the Muhammadan Anglo-Oriental College at Aligarh and earned a BA from Allahabad University. He taught in many religious schools including Sindh Madressatul Islam University in Karachi from 1897 to 1906, Muhammadan Anglo-Oriental College, and Darul Uloom in Hyderabad.

During his stay in Hyderabad Farahi proposed establishing a university in which all religious and modern sciences would be taught in Urdu. He later travelled to Sara-e-Mir, a town in Azamgarh, where in 1925 he took charge of the Madrasatul Islah, an institution based on the educational ideas of himself and Shibli Nomani. Farahi's scholarly interest centred on the Qur'an, with his works including Mufradat al-Qur'an, Asalib al-Qur'an, Jamharat al-Balaghah, Dala'il al-Nizam, and the Arabic treatise Im'an fi Aqsam al-Qur'an published in Cairo in 1349 AH.

=== Amin Ahsan Islahi ===
Amin Ahsan Islahi was born in 1904 in Bamhur village in Azamgarh. He graduated from Madarsatul Islah in 1922 and studied with Farahi for 5 years from 1925. After the partition of India he settled in Pakistan.

In 1980 he published Tadabbur-i Qur'an, an eight-volume Urdu commentary built on Farahi's work, and also translated Farahi's Arabic commentaries into Urdu as Majumu'ah-i Tafasir-i Farahi. Islahi greatly influenced Javed Ahmad Ghamidi.

=== Javed Ahmad Ghamidi ===
Javed Ahmad Ghamidi was born in 1951 in Punjab. He graduated in English literature and philosophy from Government College in Lahore in 1972 and came under Islahi's tutelage in 1973. He was earlier associated with Jamaat-e-Islami, from which he was expelled in 1977.

In 1983 Ghamidi founded Al-Mawrid, a foundation for Islamic research and education in Lahore, and taught Islamic studies at the Civil Services Academy from 1979 to 1991. He served on Pakistan's Council of Islamic Ideology under Pervez Musharraf, resigning in 2006 and leaving Pakistan in 2010 after threats from extremists opposed to his positions, including his condemnation of suicide bombing. His systematic statement of the school's teaching, Mezan, has been published in English as Islam: a Comprehensive Introduction.

== Key principles ==
=== The Qur'an as criterion ===
The Farahi school treats the Qur'an as the mizan ("scale") and furqan ("criterion") of religion. In Gamidi's formulation everything presented as part of the faith must be accepted or rejected in the Qur'an's light, and its authority stands above that of any jurist, traditionist, or theologian. The school holds that the Qur'an's language is clear and unambiguous, and that the text is to be understood through classical Arabic as having its own internal coherence so that passages of the Qur'an can be used to explain other passages. Farahi and Islahi rejected the idea of a conflict between reason and revelation, holding that the two complement one another and that the Qur'an itself trains its readers in reasoning.

=== Nazm ("coherence") ===
The question of the coherence of the surahs has long been a topic of contention, and until recently Western Islamic studies have by and large considered the Qurʾān to be largely thematically incoherent. Dr. Joseph Witztum wrote that, "In fact, until the last thirty years or so Western scholarship followed in the footsteps of the classical exegetical tradition in approaching the verses of the Quran in an atomistic manner." However, the Western field of Qurʾānic studies changed in the late 90s and a newer approach to the Qurʾān came to be developed, described as "one of the major breakthroughs of modern scholarship". This newer approach, described as the "holistic" approach, considers the surahs as a coherent literary whole and was first pioneered by Hamiduddin Farahi in a far-reaching trend still upheld by the Farahi school.

The school's distinctive contribution to the question of coherence is the theory of nazm, according to which each surah in the Qur'an is a unified composition with a central theme, an introduction, and a conclusion in addition to its primary text, with the surahs further arranged in complementary pairs and in groups. In some situations a surah's content can be separated into sections and paragraphs, whereas in others only paragraphs are used. Sections indicate larger movements in the theme, while paragraphs depict smaller shifts. Overall, the text of a surah moves through various paragraphs and sections – all of which have their individual themes – eventually reaching its conclusion.

Farahi's approach has been followed by a variety of scholars, including Angelika Neuwirth, Michael Cuypers, Irfan Shahid, Pierre Crapon de Caprona, Raymond Farrin, Neal Robinson, and others.

== Fundamental doctrines ==
The Farahi school holds a specific set of doctrines as authoritative. These fundamentals are derived from a specific understanding of the Qur'an and Sunnah, and they have been further expounded on within the school. Consequently, the Farahi school of Islamic theology holds to the following religious principles:

- The Qur'an is regarded as the Mīzān ("the scale") and the Furqān ("distinguisher between right and wrong"). It is the scale upon which everything related to faith must be weighed and it is the decisive argument in every matter of faith. Everything in the religion must stand in subservience to its verdicts.
- A support of science and philosophy.
- The Ḥadīth is a historical record of Prophetic teachings. It cannot change or modify the Qur'an in any way. Its scope is confined to explaining and elucidating religion or in delineating the exemplar of the Prophet Muhammad.
- The Sunnah is treated as an independent source of religion. It is distinct from the Hadīth. Since at times the Hadīth also contains a record of the Sunnah, people have erroneously equated the two;
- The Six Articles of Faith.
- Religious authorities need reasonable arguments to prove their claims, and their judgements may not be taken at face value.
- Ethics have an objective existence and humans are capable of recognising it through reason alone, though faulty understandings must be purged through revelation.
- Although humans are intellectually capable of realising God they require revelations and the guidance of prophets and messengers because human desire can divert the intellect, and because certain knowledge of God has been specially given to these prophets.
- The Five Pillars of Faith.

== Methodology ==
The main focus of the Farahi School is a contextualised understanding of the Qurʾān, with the study of all other aspects of the faith – such as the Hadith tradition – based on a constant reference to the Qurʾān. It is this unwavering centrality given to the Qurʾān that has enabled the school to consistently produce academically and intellectually profound research. By making the Qurʾān its sole yardstick this school has been able to engage with modern-day scholarship on a variety of issues relating to Islamic history. However, the Farahi school denies allegations of Quranism, stating that it merely prioritises the Qurʾān over all other sources of jurisprudence and theology, seeking to return to a pre-Shafi'i understanding of the faith wherein the emphasis was more on the Qurʾān and other sources of law such as legal reasoning, regional customs, and the Sunnah.

Al-Shafi'i on the other hand forcefully argued for the Qurʾān, "to be interpreted in the light of traditions (i.e. Hadith), and not vice versa". al-Shafiʿi's success was such that later writers "hardly ever thought of Sunnah as comprising anything but that of the Prophet". In contrast to the approach outlined by al-Shafiʿi the Farahi school seeks to return to precisely the understanding that dominated throughout the Muslim world prior to the rise of al-Shafiʿi. In this respect the school is similar to the approach of the early Ḥanafī school of jurisprudence prior to the surrender of the school to the principles outlined by al-Shafiʿi. The founder of what is now the largest school within Sunni Islam, Abu Hanifa, "turned to the Qur'an, those Hadiths he knew for sure to be reliable, the teachings of the Companions who had settled in Kufa and then his own reason. For him, the Qur'an was the anchor of any true understanding of God's will. Unlike the flurry of spurious Hadiths". This approach soon led to condemnation and charges of heresy from the post-Shafi'i partisans of Ḥadīth, who were dismayed with Abu Hanifa's preference of legal reasoning over Hadith.

The Farahi school seeks to emulate the pre-Shafi understanding of Islam, not rejecting authoritative sources but reinterpreting their authority in a manner the school deems to be in line with the understanding of jurists from the earliest generations of Islam, asserting that this is the proper understanding of the faith based on the most authoritative source, the Qurʾān. The school likewise does not shy away from putting canonised sources such as Bukhari and Muslim under careful scrutiny. This major principle of the school is embodied by the strict emphasis on the fact that the Ḥadīth tradition must always be studied in light of the Qurʾān. In this manner, the school alleges that most of the differences in opinion amongst jurists arise due to a misapplication of the Ḥadīth, whereby the Ḥadīth tradition is not understood in light of the Qurʾān but is instead used to interpret the Qurʾān. An example of this presented by the school is the issue of drawn images. The Qurʾān nowhere mentions their prohibition and in fact mentions their existence at the court of Solomon. However, the Ḥadīth tradition does include the prohibition of images. If this is contextualised in light of the Qurʾān and historical circumstances of the prophetic era, it can be seen that this particular prohibition was aimed at pictures that were utilised for worship by idolators. Dr. Javad Ahmad Ghamidi illustrates this hermeneutical principle"

"… All things presented as parts of the faith shall be accepted and rejected in light of the Qurʾān. All of the arguments on faith and belief must start and end on it. All other claims of revelations, inspirations, research and or opinion must be tested against the Qurʾān. It must be accepted that the authority of the Qurʾān reigns over Abu Hanifa or Shafi'i, Bukhari or Muslim, Ashari or Maturidi and Juaniad or Shibli alike. Anything that contradicts it shall not and cannot be accepted."

== Understanding of the Sunnah ==
The Farahi school considers the only thing that is identifiable as Sunnah to be that which is religious by nature. In outlining this, Dr. Ghamidi notes that the Prophet Muhammad did many things customary of Arab society, though none of these customs can be termed Sunnah. In contrast, the school alleges that the Prophet Muhammad was entirely fallible in wordly matters, pointing to several narrations in the canonical collections in order to reinforce this point. Consequently, the source of the Sunnah is the consensus of the Muslim community.

This understanding is not innovative, but reflects an earlier, more ancient understanding of the Sunnah. Daniel W. Brown writes that, "to many early Muslims, by contrast, the Sunna and ḥadīth remained conceptually independent, and the two concepts did not fully coalesce until after al-Shafiʿi. We especially notice a dissociation between ḥadīth and Sunna in early historical reports, where Sunna is often used generically signifying nothing more than acceptable social norms or custom." Thus, the call echoed by various groups calling for a return to the "Book of God and the Sunnah of the Prophet" was a call to a set of principles used to establish justice. That this was the earliest Muslim understanding of the Sunnah is confirmed by various epistles and tracts written during the 8th century.
