= Institute of Culture Heritage, Tourism and Hospitality Management =

The Institute of Cultural Heritage, Tourism and Hospitality Management (ICHTHM) was established at University of Swat in Pakistan with a view to prepare professionals in cultural heritage management, tourism and hospitality management, and archaeology.

== Overview ==
ICHTHM has been established with a view to save the tangible and intangible cultural heritage of Swat region, to establish an archaeological and ethnic profile of the region, to explore the genesis of the cultural activities, to trace the complex and rich historical past of the ancient period of the country, to promote Eco- and cultural tourism of Pakistan in general and the Malakand division and the Northern Areas in particular, and to impart quality education at graduate, undergraduate and postgraduate levels on a par with international standards.

The administrative leader of the school is Dr. Hassan Sher, currently vice chancellor.

== Students ==
The Institute of Culture Heritage, Tourism and Hospitality Management (ICHTHM) is committed to regulate the training and education of its students in order to ensure that a newly qualified Culture Heritage Management, Tourism and Hospitality Management Professionals. The institute is now offering BS degree program in Archaeology and Tourism. It considers inside to produce students
