= Kurthi Jafarpur =

Kurthi Jafarpur Pura Maroof
- Census town
- Location in Uttar Pradesh, India
- Coordinates: 25°55′52″N 83°37′41″E
- Country: India
- State: Uttar Pradesh
- District: Mau

Population (2001)
  - Total: 11,943

Languages
  - Official: Hindi / Urdu / English
- Time zone: UTC+5:30 (IST)

Pura Maroof Kurthi Jafarpur is a census town in Mau district in the Indian state of Uttar Pradesh.

== Demographics ==
Religion in Kurthi Jafarpur (2011)
Religion	Percent
Islam	75.77%
Hinduism	24.03%
Sikhism	0.01%
Christianity	0.12%
Others	0.03%

As of 2001 India census, Kurthi Jafarpur had a population of 11,943. Males constitute 51% of the population and females 49%. Kurthi Jafarpur has an average literacy rate of 56%, lower than the national average of 59.5%: male literacy is 64%, and female literacy is 49%. In Kurthi Jafarpur, 23% of the population is under 6 years of age.

== Notable people ==
- Zainul Abideen Azmi (1932 – 2013), Indian Islamic and Hadith scholar
- Nematullah Azami (born 1936), Indian Islamic and Hadith scholar
- Abdullah Maroofi (born 1967), Indian Islamic and Hadith scholar
