= Javed Ahmad Ghamidi =

Pakistani Islamic scholar and philosopher (born 1951)

Javed Ahmed Ghamidi SI
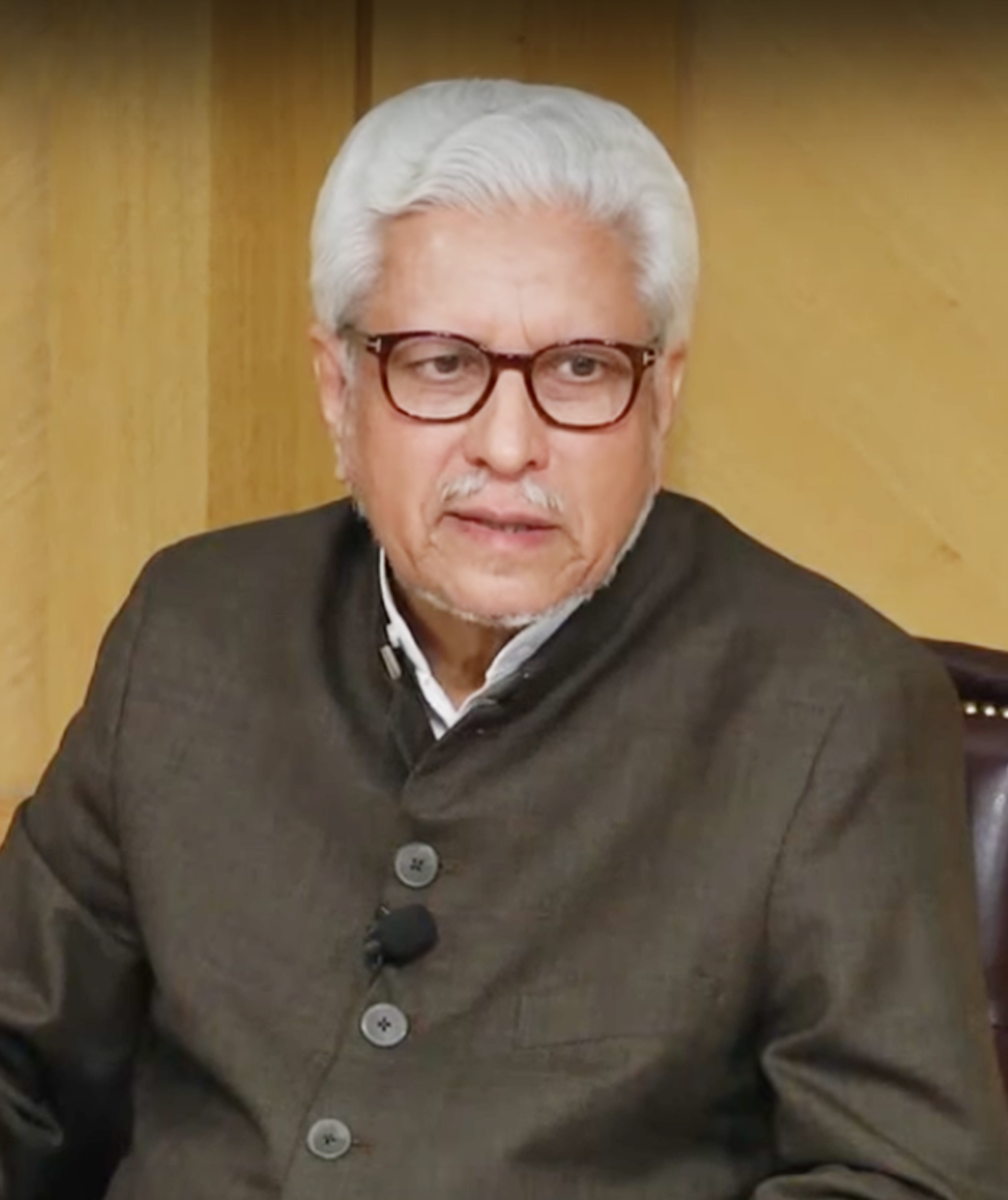
- Ghamidi in 2015

Founder and Patron Al-Mawrid (A Foundation for Islamic Research and Education) (Principal Research Fellow of Ghamidi Center of Islamic Learning)

Personal life
- Born: 18 April 1951 (age 75) Pakpattan, Punjab, Pakistan
- Era: Islamic modern era
- Region: Indian subcontinent
- Main interests: Islamic law; Quran; Exegesis; Islamic philosophy; Islamic history; Modern philosophy
- Notable ideas: Separation of Fiqh (Islamic jurisprudence) from Sharia (Divine law); Clear delineation of rules governing the primary sources of religion; Complete framework for study of Islam; Counter narrative to mystic interpretation of Islam: Sufism; Re-interpretation of Hadith under the framework of Quran.
- Notable works: Mizan; Counter Narrative; Reconstruction of Islamic Philosophy; Al Bayan (Quran exegesis)
- Education: Government College (MA in Philosophy, BA Hons in English Literature & Philosophy)
- Occupation: Islamic scholar; Philosopher; Theologian; Historian; Linguistic; Political Theorist; Poet
- Website: javedahmadghamidi.com

Religious life
- Religion: Islam
- Movement: Independent Ijtihad

Muslim leader
- Influenced by: Shibli Nomani; Hamiduddin Farahi; Amin Ahsan Islahi; Sulaiman Nadvi; Allama Iqbal; Abul Kalam Azad; Abul Ala Maududi; Wahiduddin Khan; Aristotle; Plato; Friedrich Nietzsche; Immanuel Kant; René Descartes
- Influenced: Ammar Khan Nasir; Abu Yahya; Shehzad Saleem; Khalid Zaheer; Asif Iftikhar; Muhammad Younus; Sajid Hameed; Muhammad Amir Gazdar; Moiz Amjad; Adnan Zulfiqar; Muhammad Hassan Ilyas; Hamza Ali Abbasi; Nahiem Ajmal; Muhammad Ali Mirza
- Awards: Sitara-i-Imtiaz

Javed Ahmad Ghamidi (Note: Urdu: جاوید احمد غامدی, romanized: Jāvēd Aḥmad Ghāmidī) (born 18 April 1951) is a Pakistani Islamic scholar and philosopher who is the founder of Al-Mawrid Institute of Islamic Sciences and its sister organisation Danish Sara. He is regarded as one of the most influential and popular Islamic scholars in Pakistan.

He became a member of the Council of Islamic Ideology (responsible for giving legal advice on Islamic issues to the Pakistani government and the country's Parliament) on 28 January 2006, where he remained for a couple of years. He also taught Islamic studies at the Civil Services Academy for more than a decade from 1979 to 1991. He was also a student of Islamic scholar and exegete, Amin Ahsan Islahi. He is running an intellectual movement similar to Wasatiyya, on the popular electronic media of Pakistan. Currently he is Principal Research Fellow and Chief Patron of Ghamidi Center of Islamic Learning in United States. Javed Ahmad Ghamidi was named in The Muslim 500 (The World's Most Influential Muslims) in the 2019, 2020 and 2021 editions.

== Early life ==
Javed Ahmed Ghamidi was born as Muhammad Shafique (later he renamed himself as Javed Ghamidi) on 18 April 1951 to a Kakazai family in a village called Jiwan Shah, Tehsil Arifwala in (District Pakpattan), Punjab, Pakistan. His family village settlement was Dawud in Sialkot. His father, Muhammad Tufayl Junaydi, was a landowner, involved in medicine and a committed follower of tasawwuf until his death in 1986.

Ghamidi and his two elder sisters grew up in a Sufi household. His early education included a modern path (matriculating from Islamia High School, Pakpattan), as well as a traditional path (Arabic and Persian languages, and the Qur'an with Nur Ahmad of Nang Pal).

His first exposure to traditional Islamic studies was in the Sufi tradition. After matriculating, he came to Lahore in 1967 where he is settled ever since. Initially, he was more interested in Literature and Philosophy. He later graduated from Government College, Lahore, with a BA Honours in English Literature & Philosophy in 1972.

Ghamidi encountered the works of Hamiduddin Farahi, a scholar of the Quran by chance in a library. Finding mention of Amin Ahsan Islahi (who advanced Farahi's thought) in this work inspired Ghamidi to meet Islahi who resided in Lahore during that time. This encounter would change Ghamidi's focus from philosophy and literature, to religion.

In his book, Maqamat (مقامات), Ghamidi starts with an essay "My Name" (میرا نام) to describe the story behind his surname, which sounds somewhat alien in the context of the Indian Subcontinent. He describes a desire during his childhood years to establish a name linkage to his late grandfather Noor Elahi, after learning of his status as the one people of the area turned to, to resolve disputes. This reputation also led to his (grandfather's) reputation as a peacemaker (مصلح). Subsequently, one of the visiting Sufi friends of his father narrated a story of the patriarch of the Arab tribe Banu Ghamid who earned the reputation of being a great peacemaker. He writes, that the temporal closeness of these two events clicked in his mind and he decided to add the name Ghamidi to his given name, Javed Ahmed. Taxila.

== Views ==
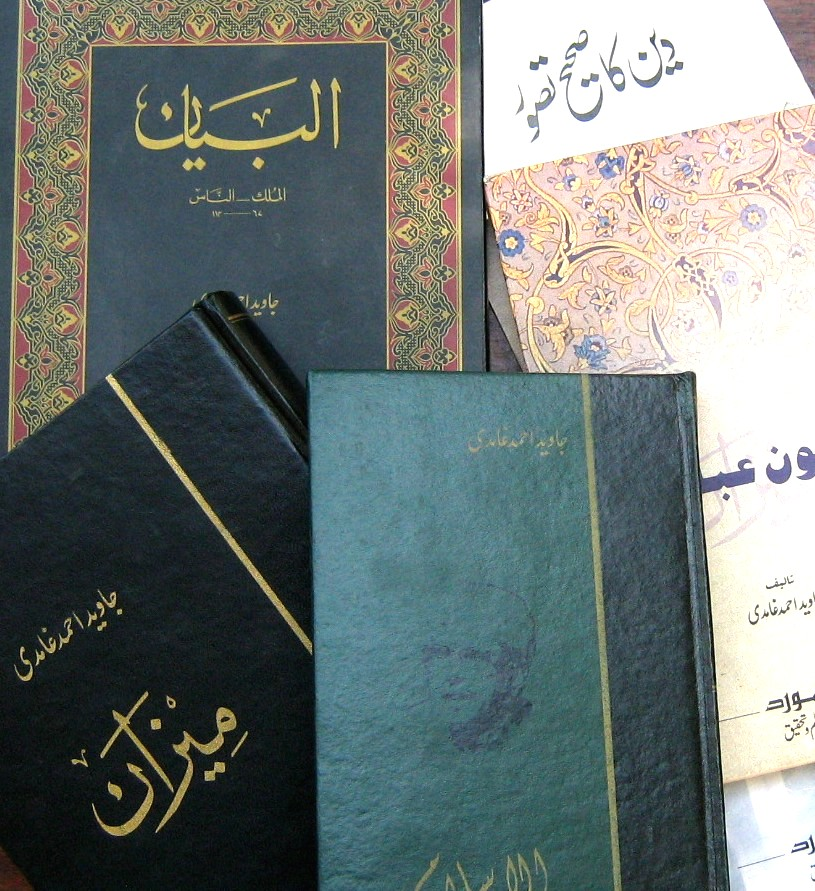
Some of the works of Ghamidi

Ghamidi's conclusions and understanding of Islam, including the Sharia, has been presented concisely in his book Mizan with the intention of presenting the religion in its pure shape in his opinion, cleansed from tasawwuf, qalam, fiqh, all philosophies and any other contaminants.

In his arguments, there is no reference to the Western sources, human rights or current philosophies of crime and punishment. Nonetheless, employing the traditional Islamic framework, he reaches conclusions which are similar to those of Islamic modernists and progressives on the subject. In truth he goes into disputes with traditional islamic scholars

=== Jihad ===
The only valid basis for jihad through arms is to end oppression when all other measures have failed. According to him Jihad can only be waged by an organised Islamic state, that too only where a leader has been nominated by the previous leader or by the consensus of the ulema if the state is newly established. No person, party or group can take arms into their hands (for the purpose of waging Jihad) under any circumstances. Another corollary, in his opinion, is that death punishment for apostasy was also specifically for the recipients of the same Divine punishment during Muhammad's times—for they had persistently denied the truth of Muhammad's mission even after it had been made conclusively evident to them by God through Muhammad.

According to Ghamidi, the formation of an Islamic state is not a religious obligation upon the Muslims per se. However, if and when Muslims do happen to form a state of their own, Islam does impose certain religious obligations on its rulers as establishment of the institutions of salat (obligatory prayer), zakah (mandatory charity), and 'amr bi'l-ma'ruf wa nahi 'ani'l-munkar (preservation and promotion of society's good conventions and customs and eradication of social vices); this, in Ghamidi's opinion, should be done in modern times through courts, police, etc. in accordance with the law of the land which, as the government itself, must be based on the opinion of the majority.

=== Gender interaction ===
Ghamidi argues that the Qur'an states norms for male-female interaction in Surah An-Nur, while in Surah Al-Ahzab, there are special directives for Muhammad's wives and directives given to Muslim women to distinguish themselves when they were being harassed in Medina. He further claims that the Qur'an has created a distinction between men and women only to maintain family relationships.

=== Penal laws ===
According to Ghamidi:

- The Islamic punishments of hudud (Islamic law) are maximum pronouncements that can be mitigated by a court of law on the basis of extenuating circumstances.
- The shariah (Divine law) does not stipulate any fixed amount for the diyya (monetary compensation for unintentional murder); the determination of the amount—for the unintentional murder of a man or a woman—has been left to the conventions of society.
- Ceteris paribus (all other things being equal), a woman's testimony is equal to that of a man's.
- Rape is hirabah and deserves severe punishments as mentioned in Quran 5:33. It doesn't require four witnesses to register the case as in the case of Zina (Arabic) (consensual sex). Those who were punished by stoning (rajm) in Muhammad's time were also punished under hirabah for raping, sexually assaulting women, and spreading vulgarity in society through prostitution.

=== Sources of Islam ===
According to Ghamidi, all that is Islam is constituted by the Qur'an and Sunnah. Nothing besides these two is Islam or can be regarded as part of it. Just like Quran, Sunnah (the way of the prophet) is only what the Muslim nation received through ijma (consensus of companions of the prophet) and tawatur (perpetual adherence of the Muslim nation). Unlike Quran and Sunnah, ahadith only explain and elucidate what is contained in these two sources and also describe the exemplary way in which Muhammad followed Islam. The Sharia is distinguished from fiqh, the latter being collections of interpretations and applications of the Sharia by Muslim jurists. Fiqh is characterised as a human exercise, and therefore subject to human weakness and differences of opinion. A Muslim is not obliged to adhere to a school of fiqh.

=== Democracy ===
While discussing the Afghan Taliban, Ghamidi wrote:

The Taliban say that democracy is a concept alien to Islam. The ideal way to set up an Islamic government in our times is the one that they adopted for Mullah Omar's government in Afghanistan. The constitution, the parliament, and elections are nothing but modern day shams. ... I can say with full confidence on the basis of my study of Islam that this viewpoint and this strategy are not acceptable to the Qur'ān. It prescribes democracy as the way to run the affairs of the state. The Qur'ān (42:38) says: amruhum shūrā baynahum (the affairs of the Muslims are run on the basis of their consultation). 'Umar (may Allah be pleased with him) said: "Whosoever pledges allegiance to anyone without the collective consent of the Muslims presents himself for the death sentence." It is true that, in Muslim history, monarchy and dictatorship have often been accepted forms of government. Some people also believe that the head of government should be a nominee of God Himself. However, the principle the Qur'ān spells out is very clear.

— Javed A. Ghamidi, Islam and the Taliban

=== Morals and ethics ===
Ghamidi writes on moral and ethical issues in Islam. He states:

After faith, the second important requirement of religion is purification of morals. This means that a person should cleanse his attitude both towards his Creator and towards his fellow human beings. This is what is termed as a righteous deed. All the sharī‘ah is its corollary. With the change and evolution in societies and civilizations, the sharī‘ah has indeed changed; however faith and righteous deeds, which are the foundations of religion, have not undergone any change. The Qur'an is absolutely clear that any person who brings forth these two things before the Almighty on the Day of Judgement will be blessed with Paradise which shall be his eternal abode.

== Interaction with other Islamic scholars ==
Like Wahiduddin Khan, Maulana Naeem Siddiqui, Israr Ahmed and Dr. Khazir Yasin, Ghamidi also worked closely with Amin Ahsan Islahi and Maulana Syed Abul Ala Maududi (1903–1979). His work with Maududi continued for about nine years before he voiced his first differences of opinion, which led to his subsequent expulsion from Maududi's political party, Jamaat-e-Islami in 1977. Later, he developed his own view of religion based on hermeneutics and ijtihad under the influence of his mentor, Amin Ahsan Islahi (1904–1997), a well-known exegete of the Indian sub-continent who is author of Tadabbur-i-Qur'an, a Tafsir (exegeses of Qur'an). Ghamidi's critique of Maududi's thought is an extension of Wahid al-Din Khan's criticism of Maududi. Khan (1925–2020 ) was amongst the first scholars from within the ranks of Jamaat-e-Islami to present a full-fledged critique of Maududi's understanding of religion. Khan's contention is that Maududi has completely inverted the Qur'anic worldview. Ghamidi, for his part, agreed with Khan that the basic obligation in Islam is not the establishment of an Islamic world order but servitude to God, and that it is to help and guide humans in their effort to fulfill that obligation for which religion is revealed. Therefore, Islam never imposed the obligation on its individual adherents or on the Islamic state to be constantly in a state of war against the non-Islamic world. In fact, according to Ghamidi, even the formation of an Islamic state is not a basic religious obligation for Muslims. Despite such extraordinary differences and considering Maududi's interpretation of "political Islam" as incorrect, Ghamidi in one of his 2015 interviews said that he still respects his former teacher like a father.

Ghamidi's thought and discourse community has received some academic attention in the recent past by Pakistani scholar Dr. Husnul Amin whose critical analysis of Ghamidi's thought movement has received academic attention. Amin traces the history of secessionist tendencies within the mainstream Islamism, and its ruptures, and then critically examines Ghamidi's emergence and proliferation in society as an unprecedented phenomenon. Ghamidi's views and discourse on Islam and democracy have also been examined in another cited research paper.

== Awards and recognition ==
In 2009, Ghamidi was awarded Sitara-i-Imtiaz, the third highest civilian honor of Pakistan.

== Resignation from Council of Islamic Ideology ==
Ghamidi resigned in September 2006 from the Council of Islamic Ideology (CII), a constitutional body responsible for providing legal advice on Islamic issues to the Pakistani government. His resignation was 'accepted' by the President of Pakistan. Ghamidi's resignation was prompted by the Pakistani government's formation of a separate committee of ulema to review a Bill involving women's rights; the committee was formed after extensive political pressure was applied by the MMA. Ghamidi argued that this was a breach of the CII's jurisdiction, since the very purpose of the council is to ensure that Pakistan's laws do not conflict with the teachings of Islam. He also said that the amendments in the bill proposed by the Ulema committee were against the injunctions of Islam. This event occurred when the MMA threatened to resign from the provincial and national assemblies if the government amended the Hudood Ordinance, which came into being under Zia-ul-Haq's Islamization. The Hudood Ordinances have been criticised for, among other things, a reportedly difficult procedure to prove allegations of rape.

== Public appearances ==
Ghamidi has appeared regularly on dedicated television programs. His television audience consists of educated, urban-based middle-class men and women between the ages of 20–35, as well as lay Islamic intellectuals and professionals. Ghamidi's religiously oriented audience tends to be dissatisfied with the positions of traditional ulema and Western-educated secular-liberal elite, and find his interventions and ideas more sensible, moderate, and relevant.

- Alif on Geo TV (in multiple airings)
- Ghamidi on Geo TV
- Live with Ghamidi on AAJ TV (usually Q/A format but with occasional special programs). The channel also airs other Islamic programs by Javed Ahmad Ghamidi and his associates, such as Aaj Islam.
- And other channels like PTV.
- Al-Mawrid has video recording setup of its own.
- Ilm-o-Hikmat, Ghamidi Key Saath (Urdu: علم و حکمت، غامدی کے ساتھ) (Knowledge and Wisdom with Ghamidi) on Duniya TV.
- Youtube Channels like Ghamidi Center Of Islamic Learning, Al Mawrid Hind, Javed Ahmad Ghamidi

== Criticism ==
Some books highly critical of Ghamidi are, Fitna-e-Ghamdiyat (فِتنئہ غامدیت) by Hafiz Salahuddin Yusuf and Fitna-e-Ghamdiyat ka Ilmi Muhasbah (فِتنئہ غامدیّت کا عِلمی محاسبہ) by Muhammad Rafiq. Recently, another critical book has been written by Dr. Muhammad Mushtaq (ex-Director General Shariah Academy, IIU Islamabad and professor of law at Shifa Ta'meer e Millat University, Islamabad), a student of the Islamic jurist Imran Ahsan Khan Nyazee, namely 'فکرِ غامدی – ایک تنقیدی جائزہ' (Ghamidi's thought – a critique). Ghamidi has adopted the view, in accordance with Islamic principles, that disagreement should always be done within the realm of respect. And he does not pay attention to criticism at him.

== Exile from Pakistan ==
Ghamidi left Pakistan in 2010 as a result of opposition to his work and threat to his life and his close ones. In a 2015 interview with Voice of America, Ghamidi explained his reason for departure was to safeguard the lives of people near him including his neighbours who had begun to fear for their safety. Some of his close associates had already been killed like Muhammad Farooq Khan and Dr. Habib-ur-Rehman. Ghamidi maintained that his work of education was not affected by his departure because of modern communication. Ghamidi, also regularly appears on Ilm-o-Hikmat, a Pakistani Dunya News show. He has stated his desire to return in the future when circumstances change.

Ghamidi moved to United States of America as of July 2019 after living in Malaysia, to support establishment of Ghamidi Center of Islamic Learning (GCIL), an initiative of Al-Mawrid US and an educational institute named after himself.

== Publications ==
Ghamidi's books include:

- Al-Bayan (Volume 1 to 5)
- Mizan میزان
- Burhan برہان
- Maqamat مقامات
- Al-Islam الاسلام
- Khayal-o-Khamah

English Translation of his works by Dr. Shehzad Saleem:

- Al-Bayan (Volume 1 and 5)
- Islam: A Comprehensive Introduction
- Selected Essays of Javed Ahmed Ghamidi
- Islam: A Concise Introduction
- The Qur'ān Translated
