= Amin Ahsan Islahi =

Muslim scholar and translator of the Quran

Mawlānā Imam Ameen Ahsan Islahi مولانا امین احسن اصلاحی
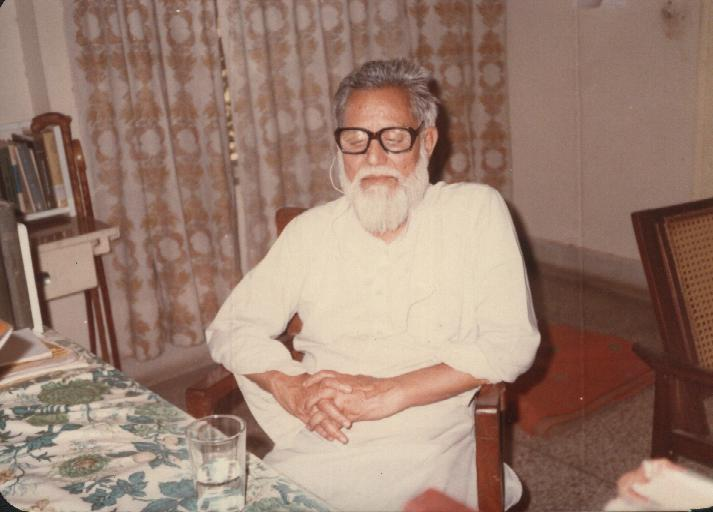

Personal life
- Born: 1904 Azamgarh, United Provinces of Agra and Oudh, British India
- Died: 15 December 1997 (aged 92-93) Lahore, Punjab, Pakistan
- Resting place: DHA, Lahore, Punjab, Pakistan
- Era: Modern era
- Region: Indian subcontinent
- Main interest: Quran
- Notable idea(s): Concept of thematic and structural coherence in Quran
- Notable work: Taddabur-i-quran
- Occupation: Theologian; linguistic; Imam; Bibliographer

Religious life
- Religion: Islam
- Creed: Sunni

Muslim leader
- Disciple of: Hamiduddin Farahi
- Influenced by: Hamiduddin Farahi; Shibli Nomani
- Influenced: Khalid Masud; Javed Ahmad Ghamidi; Israr Ahmed; Muhammad Farooq Khan; Yusuf Islahi; Nouman Ali Khan; Wahiduddin Khan
- Known for: Nazm, or Coherence, in the Quran theory of Nazm-ul-Quran

Amin Ahsan Islahi (Urdu: مولانا امین احسن اصلاحی; 1904 – 15 December 1997), was a Pakistani Islamic scholar best known for his Urdu exegesis of the Quran, Tadabbur-i-Quran ("Pondering on the Quran"), which he based on Hamiduddin Farahi's (1863 – 1930), idea of thematic and structural coherence in the Qur'an.

== Early life ==
Islahi was born in 1904 at Bamhur village in Azamgarh, United Provinces (now Uttar Pradesh), British India (now India). After graduating from Madrasatul Islah in Azamgarh in 1922, he entered the field of journalism. He was the son in law of Chaudhry Abdul Rehman Khan. First he worked as an associated editor in "Khoonch" a children magazine. Then he edited a newspaper Madinah at Bijnor, India and also remained associated with "Sach", a newspaper taken out by Abdul Majid Daryabadi.

== Inspiration from Hamiduddin Farahi ==
In 1925 Hamiduddin Farahi invited Islahi to study the Qur’an with him and Islahi left his journalistic career to do so. He learned from Farahi the principles of direct deliberation on the Book of Allah. During this time, he also taught the Qur’an and Arabic literature at the Madrasah.

After Farahi's death, Islahi studied Hadith from the scholar Abdu’l Rahman Muhaddith Mubarakpuri. In 1936, Islahi founded the "Daira-i-Hamidiyyah", a small institute to disseminate the Qur’anic thought of Farahi. Under the auspices of this institute, he brought out a monthly journal "Al-Islah" in which he translated many portions of Farahi's treatises written in Arabic. The journal was published until 1939, after which it was discontinued.

== Association with Jamaat-e-Islami ==
Like Naeem Siddiqui, Manzoor Nomani and Abul Hasan Ali Hasani Nadwi, Islahi was among the founder members of the Jamaat-e-Islami, a religious party founded by the eminent Islamic scholar Abul A'la Maududi in 1941. During his seventeen-year stay in the party, he represented the intellectual element and remained a member of the central governing body, Majlis-i-Shura. During this period, he did the groundwork needed to write a commentary of the Qur’an – an objective which he had set before him early in life. In 1956 the Government of Pakistan set up the Islamic Law Commission and Islahi – an expert on Islamic law – served as a member until the commission was abolished in 1958 by the martial law regime of General Ayub Khan. In 1958, he quit the party after serious differences arose between him and Mawdudi over some policy differences.

Islahi considered participating in elections a useless exercise for the purposes of bringing about an Islamic change. His thinking simply was that politicians cannot establish Islam. Many politicians' aim is to gain power by any means necessary. He thought that if some people use the name of Islam, they do so to achieve their own political objectives.

In his view, those who would like to work for the cause of Islam and its revival should work among people selflessly, without any desire for gaining power. These workers should approach the people only to serve them, to educate them, and to help them reform their lives morally in the Islamic way of life.

== Completion of Tadabbur-i-Qur’an ==
After leaving the Jamaat-e-Islami, he began writing a commentary of the Qur’an. He also launched a monthly journal Mithaq in which portions of this commentary, Tadabbur-i-Qur’an were published. In 1961 he established a small study circle, Halqa-i-Tadabbur-i Qur’an, for college students to whom he taught Arabic language and literature, the Qur’an and Sahih Muslim. In 1965, an incident brought an end to both the journal and the study circle: Islahi's eldest son Abu Saleh died in a plane crash. However, work on the commentary continued. In 1970–71, Islahi fell severely ill and had to discontinue all his intellectual pursuits but he later recovered. In 1972, he moved to a country village near Sheikhupura where he continued to work on the commentary utill 1979, when he returned to Lahore. On the 29th of Ramadan 1400 (August 12, 1980) he finished Tadabbur-i-Qur’an after twenty-two years of work.

In 1981 Islahi founded the Idara-i-Tadabbur-i Qur’an-o Hadith and appointed his close pupil Khalid Masud as first Nazim of this Idara (institution), which later came under the supervision of Abdullah Ghulam Ahmed in Lahore, Pakistan. It remained the centre of all his intellectual activities until his death on 15 December 1997. A quarterly journal, Tadabbur, was taken out in 1981 as its organ. Khalid Masud was appointed its first editor and in charge till his death in Oct 2003. He gave weekly lectures on the text of the Qur’an. Later he took up deep study on the principles of Hadith and began teaching the Al-Muwatta of Imam Malik in weekly sittings to a close circle of students and associates. After completing Al-Muwatta, he also taught some portions of Imam Bukhari's Sahih Bukhari. Many of these lectures have been transcribed and published in the Tadabbur. Khalid Masud played a major role in converting Islahi's speeches and lectures into publication for benefits of the Islamic scholars and public.

== Works ==
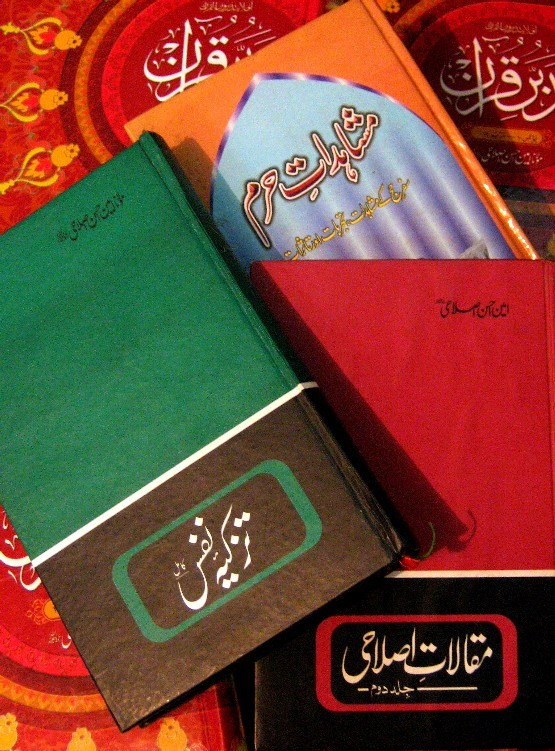
Some of Islahi's works

Besides the nine volume Urdu Tafsir Tadabbur-i-Qur’an (Pondering on the Qura'n), which Islahi started writing in 1958 and finished in 1980, he wrote a number of articles and authored a number of books on various topics of Islam, including:

1. ‘تزكيہ نفس’ (Tazkiyah-i-Nafs: Purification of the Soul)
2. ‘حقيقت شرك’ (Haqiqat-i-Shirk: The Essence of Polytheism)
3. ‘حقيقت توحيد’ (Haqiqat-i-Tawhid: The Essence of Monotheism)
4. (Haqeeqat-e- Risalath: The Essence of Prophethood)
5. Haqeeqath-e- Ma-aad: The Essence of Hereafter
6. ‘دعوت دين اور اس كا طريقہ كار’ (Da‘wat-i-Din awr us ka Tariqah-i-Kar: Islamic Message and the Mode of its Preaching)
7. ‘اسلامى قانون كى تدوين’ (Islami Qanun ki Tadwin: Codification of Islamic law)
8. ‘اسلامى رياست’ (Islami Riyasat: The Islamic state)
9. ‘اسلامى معاشره ميں عورت كا مقام’ (Islami Mu‘asharay mayn ‘Awrat ka Muqam: The Status of Women in an Islamic Society)
10. ‘حقيقت نماز’ (Haqiqat-i-Namaz: The Essence of the Prayer)
11. ‘حقيقت تقوى’ (Haqiqat-i-Taqwah: The Essence of Piousness)
12. ‘اسلامي رياست ميں فقہى اختلافات كا حل’ (Islami Riyasat mayn Fiqhi Ikhtilafat ka Hal: Solution of Juristic Differences in an Islamic State)
13. ‘مبادي تدبر قرآن’ (Mabadi Tadabbur-i-Qur’an: Principles of Understanding the Qur’an)
14. ‘مبادي تدبر حديث’ (Mabadi Tadabbur-i-Hadees: Principles of Understanding the Hadees)
15. ‘تنقيدات’ (Tanqidat: A collection of critical essays)
16. ‘توضيحات’ (Tawdihat: A collection of general explanatory essays)
17. ‘مقالات اصلاحي’ (Maqalat-i-Islahi: A miscellaneous collection of articles)
18. ‘قرآن ميں پرده كے احكامات’ (Qur’an mayn Parday kay Ahkamat: The Directives of Hijab in the Qur’an)
19. ‘تفہيم دين’ (Tafhim-i-Din: Understanding Islam)
20. ‘فلسفـے كے مسائل قرآن كى روشنى ميں’ (Falsafay kay Matha’il Qur’an ki Rawshani mayn: Philosophical Issues in the Light of the Qur’an)
21. Tadabbur -e- Hadeedh (Understanding the Hadees)

Islahi also translated Farahi's commentary consisting of fourteen Surahs of the Qur’an, as well as his following books from Arabic:

1. (Majmua Tafathir Farahi)
2. ‘في من هو الذبيح’ (Fi man huwa al-Dhabih: Which of Abraham's son was Sacrificed?)
3. ‘اقسام القرآن’ (Aqsamu’l-Qur’an: Oaths of the Qur’an)

== Death and legacy ==
Amin Ahsan Islahi died in Lahore, Pakistan on 15 December 1997 at age 93. His students in Pakistan include Khalid Masud and Javed Ahmad Ghamidi. Islahi was described by a former student as "very sensitive, courteous and caring, frank yet very reasonable, warm and loving" and that Islahi thought the most important thing in his life was to "explain and elucidate" the Quran.

After his death, Khalid Masud succeeded him in charge of Idara-i-Tadabbur-i Qur’an-o Hadith.

== See also ==
- Naeem Siddiqui
- Islamic scholars
- Khalid Masud
- Javed Ahmed Ghamidi
- Mizan
- Chaudhry Abdul Hameed Khan
- Muntasir Mir
