= Tadabbur-i-Quran =

Qur'anic exegeses by Amin Ahsan Islahi

- Tadabbur-i-Quran
- Author: Amin Ahsan Islahi
- Original title: تدبر قرآن
- Language: Urdu
- Subject: Quranic commentary
- Genre: Islamic literature
- Publication date: 1980
- Publication place: Pakistan
- Media type: Print (Hardcover)
- Pages: 9 volumes (6,000 pages)

Tadabbur-i-Qur'an (Urdu: تدبر قرآن) is a exegeses (tafsir) of the Qur'an by Amin Ahsan Islahi based on the concept of thematic and structural coherence, which was originally inspired by Allama Hamiduddin Farahi. The tafsir is extended over nine volumes of six thousand pages. It was originally written in Urdu, but now it is being translated in English. And it is translated in Tamil by Abdur Rahman Umari.

== Contents ==
It expounds each surah as a coherent discourse, arranging surahs into pairs, and establishing seven major surah divisions – the entire Qur'an thus emerges as a well-connected and systematic book.

Each division has a distinct theme. Topics within a division are more or less in the order of revelation. Within each division, each member of the pair complements the other in various ways. The seven divisions are as follows:

Group	From	To	Central theme
1	Al-Fatiha ^{[Quran 1:1]}	Al-Ma'ida ^{[Quran 5:1]}	Islamic law
2	Al-An'am ^{[Quran 6:1]}	At-Tawba ^{[Quran 9:1]}	The consequences of denying the holy Prophet for the polytheists of Mecca
3	Yunus ^{[Quran 10:1]}	An-Nur ^{[Quran 24:1]}	Glad tidings of domination of the holy Prophet
4	Al-Furqan ^{[Quran 25:1]}	Al-Ahzab ^{[Quran 33:1]}	Arguments on the prophethood of the holy Prophet and the requirements of faith in him
5	Saba ^{[Quran 34:1]}	Al-Hujraat ^{[Quran 49:1]}	Arguments on monotheism and the requirements of faith in it
6	Qaf ^{[Quran 50:1]}	At-Tahrim ^{[Quran 66:1]}	Arguments on afterlife and the requirements of faith in it
7	Al-Mulk ^{[Quran 67:1]}	An-Nas ^{[Quran 114:1]}	Admonition to the Quraysh about their fate in the Herein and the Hereafter if they deny the holy Prophet

=== Response to Orientalists ===
For quite some time, there was a theory that there is no coherence in Qurān. It was asserted that Qurān is a collection of different verses having no logical connection with each other. In the late 19th and early 20th century Western scholars propounded the theory and some of them proposed chronological order on the basis of which the Qurān should be rearranged. On the other hand, Qurān has the most important place in the Muslim community. They derive all religious guidance and aspirations from the Qurān.

Orientalists assert that Qurān does not even fulfil the characteristics of a book. How can it be claimed to be the best of all the books? Tadabbur-i-Qurān is conceived to an answer to the challenge that the Qurān is not a coherent book. Islahi wrote his magnum opus, on the principles derived from his teacher, Farahi, who address the issue in the beginning of 20th century. Islahi started his work on this project at the beginning of his career and completed it in 1980. The work upholds that Qurān is not a haphazardly arranged book, but that there is a structural and thematic coherence in the Qurān. The arrangement of the Qurān is divine and rational. Islahi divided the whole Quran in seven groups named Amud (central theme). Each section is revolving around a particular theme. Each sura is carrying a theme and connected with the adjacent sura as pair. Each is complementing the other by different ways with the exception of sura Fatiha.

=== Influence ===
The concept of nazm in Qurān adopted by Islahi in his exegesis led him to interpret Qurān in many places different from the other Ulama. Another characteristic of Tadabbur-i-Qurān is specification of the addresses of the text. This is important to determine implication of the tenets of Qurān upon the Muslims. Tadabbur-i-Qurān is influencing Islamīc literature more than any other Qurānic exegetical work in modern times. No future scholar undertaking interpretation and exposition of Qurān or working on Islamīc themes can afford to ignore this monumental exegetical work of Islahi.

== See also ==
- List of Sunni books
