= Baghdada =

Place in Pakistan

Baghdada بغدادہ
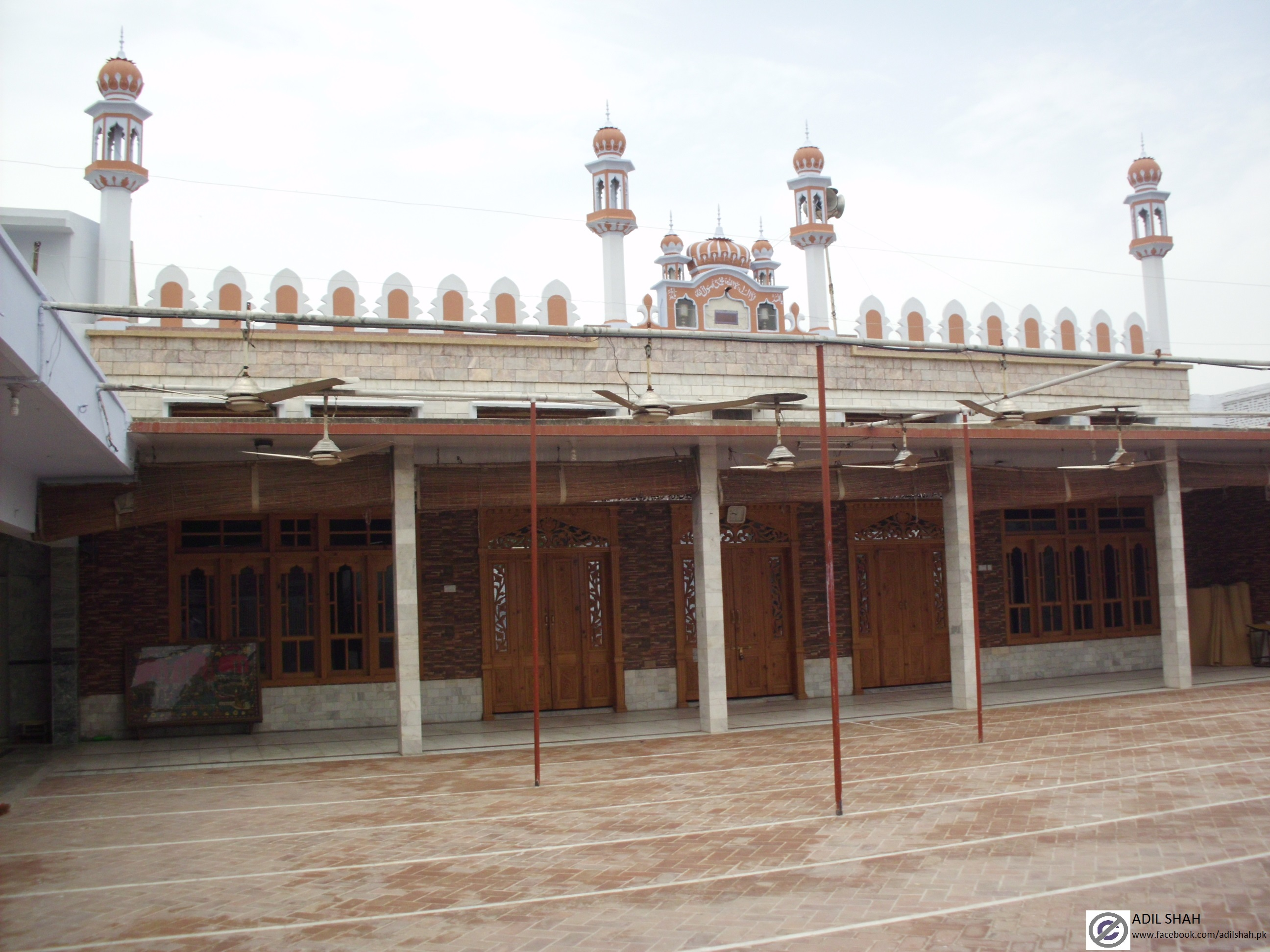

- Location within Pakistan
- Coordinates: 34.13°N 72.02°E
- Country: Pakistan
- Province: Khyber-Pakhtunkhwa
- District: Mardan
- Tehsil: Mardan

Government
  - Nazim: Administrator(care taker)
- Elevation: 288 m (945 ft)
- Time zone: UTC+5 (PST)

Baghdada (Urdu: بغدادہ, Pashto: بغدادہ) is a town of Mardan District in the Khyber-Pakhtunkhwa, Pakistan.

== Geography ==
Baghdada is located at 34°13'0N 72°2'0E with an altitude of 288 metres (948 feet) and lies close to the Islamabad-Peshawar motorway. The Kalpani river flows at the eastern side of town.

== See also ==
- List of mosques in Pakistan
- F.G. Public High School Mardan
