= Madrasatul Islah =

Town In Saraimir, Azamgarh, Uttarpradesh, India

Madraasatul Islah
- Established: 1908; 118 years ago
- Founder: Maulana Muhammad Shafi
- Religious affiliation: Islam
- Rector: Fakhrul Islam Islahi
- Principal: Mufti Saiful Islam Islahi
- Location: Sarai Mir, Azamgarh, Uttar Pradesh, India
- Website: madrasatulislah.com

Madrasatul Islah is a traditional Islamic institution of learning and a renowned center of oriental and Islamic studies at Sarai Mir in the Azamgarh district of Uttar Pradesh. It was started by Mawlana Muhammad Shafi in 1908 along with participation of prominent scholars and religious seminaries of the area. The madrassa was established with a different syllabus and ideology than that of Darul Uloom Deoband and Darul Uloom Nadwatul Ulama. Shibli Nomani and Hamiduddin Farahi are regarded as chief architects of this madrasa.

== Inception ==
The foundation stone of the madrassa was laid by Asghar Hussain Deobandi in 1908. Hamiduddin Farahi was its first chief administrator. Amin Ahsan Islahi remained teaching in the madrassa until 1943.

== Style ==
The Madrasa adopted a teaching style of reading the Qur'an text directly with less reliance on commentaries. A newspaper article in 2009 indicated the madrasa has, in common with many others, introduced "modern, progressive syllabi".

== Notable alumni ==
The madrassa has produced a number of notable Islamic scholars:

- Mohammad Najatuallah Siddiqi
- Abdul Azim Islahi
- Amin Ahsan Islahi
- Wahiduddin Khan
- Ishtiyaq Ahmad Zilli
- Sadruddin Islahi
- Akhtar Muslimi
- Muhammad Yusuf Islahi

== Legacy ==
- 2003, Role of Madrasatul Islah Azamgarh in the development of Arabic studies, PhD thesis by Arshad Azmi, Aligarh Muslim University.

== See also ==
- Darul Uloom Deoband
- Darul Uloom Nadwatul Ulama

== Bibliography ==
- Abdul, Rauf (2009). "Life and Works of Mawlana Amin Ahsan Islahi (1904-1997)" (PDF). Pakistan Journal of History and Culture. XXX (1). Archived (PDF) from the original on 25 March 2020.
- Singh, R. P.; Rana, Rana (2002). Teacher Education in Turmoil : quest for a solution. Sterling Publishers Pvt.Ltd. ISBN 8120724313. OCLC 605384073. OL 19164308W.
