= Saleem Sarang =

Indian politician

Vice President of Nationalist Congress Party
- In office September 2021

Director of Maulana Azad Minority Financial Development Corporation Limited, Government of Maharashtra
- Incumbent
- Assumed office Incumbent – 10 October 2024

Founder & National President Muslim Welfare Association

Personal details
- Born: 23 December 1977 (age 48)
- Party: Nationalist Congress Party
- Occupation: Indian Politician
- Awards: Mumbai Ratna by Governor of Maharashtra (2021), Minority Welfare Leadership Award, Social Service Excellence Award, Iconic Leader in Social Impact Award (2026)
- Website: www.saleemsarang.com

Saleem Sarang (also spelled Salim Sarang; born 1977) is an Indian politician from Maharashtra. He is serving as the Maharashtra State Vice-President of the Nationalist Congress Party since 23 November 2023 and Director of Maulana Azad Minorities Financial Development Corporation Limited (MAMFDC) which works under Government of Maharashtra. Previously he served as the National secretary of Nationalist Congress Party's Minority Department. He is also the Founder and National President the Muslim Welfare Association and serving as its president since its inception.

He was National General Secretary of the All National Ulema Board and Chairman of Waqf Wing. He was one of the star campaigners of Nationalist Congress Party for 2024 Maharashtra Legislative Assembly election.

== Career ==
In September 2021, the Nationalist Congress Party (NCP) appointed him as the National General Secretary of the party's minority cell. He also acts as Maharashtra observer for NCP. He previously served as the General Secretary of NCP's minority department of Maharashtra state.

In August 2021, he alleged Navi Mumbai Municipal Corporation (NMMC) for poor cleanliness in the city of Navi Mumbai. In August 2021, Sarang held a press conference to bring the issue of the e-toilets built by NMMC and hoarding scams by advertising agencies and NMMC. He also openly pointed out the loopholes in the functioning of NMMC.

During COVID-19 pandemic and lockdown in Maharashtra, he reached out to the poor and the needy, among whom were many daily wagers and distributed food and ration kits among 10,000 families, reportedly.

=== Positions held ===
- Sarang was appointed as the Maharashtra State General Secretary of the Nationalist Congress Party's Minority Cell on 30 August 2021.
- Sarang was appointed as the National General Secretary of NCP Minority Department on 20 September 2021.
- Appointed as Director of Maulana Azad Minorities Financial Development Corporation Limited (MAMFDC) on 10 October 2024.
- Star campaigner of Nationalist Congress Party for the Maharashtra State Assembly Elections, 2024.

On Ajit Pawar's demise, Saleem Sarang expressed grief. Sarang took to social media and posted a heartfelt note:

Dada, it has been exactly five months since you left us. Time moves on, yet the void created by your absence is felt more deeply with each passing day. You were not merely a party leader to us; you were the embodiment of the party workers' trust. Whenever a problem arose, one did not need any recommendation to reach. But now, one has to state his identity, secure an appointment an often plead for a meeting- even after that there is no response. Under your leadership, every worker felt that our leaders stands beside us. Today, that sentiment is gradually fading. There is lingering sense of grievance that the expectations, problems, and communication needs of the workers are not receiving the attention they one did. Meetings are not taking place, dialogue has diminished and questions are beginning to arise about whether the workers' voices are even reaching the leadership. Today we deeply miss a leader like you- someone who knew party workers by their names, gave time to them and stood by them selflessly.

NCP leader, Saleem Sarang shares Sarang shares good relations with BJP leaders Devendra Fadnavis and Eknath Shinde. There are even some substantiated discussion regarding Sarang quitting NCP and entre into the BJP, yet there is no confirmed information out in public.

== Activism ==
Sarang leading Ulema's under the Nationalist Congress Party advocated for 5% reservations for Muslims in the Educational Sector. He met Ajit Pawar, Deputy Chief Minister of Maharashtra, and was assured of the same. He has also written a letter to Eknath Shinde, Chief Minister of Maharashtra. He also met Chhagan Bhujbal accompanied with Ulema Waqf Board delegation and requested for his support in 5% reservation for Muslims. Following this, BJP minister Nitesh Rane claimed that minorities won't be given any reservation under BJP's reign. Sarang took a dig, conveying how Rane attempted to create controversy around the upliftment of the community.

In August 2024, he criticized Ramgiri Maharaj for his comments on Prophet Muhammad. He also demanded for the arrest of Ramgiri Maharaj.

In March 2025, after major setback and defeat in the Municipal elections, Sarang questioned the party leadership and accountability, highlighting the internal politics present within the NCP.

In May 2025, the Muslim Welfare Association proposed a demand of 10% reservation in MIDC. They sent out a letter to Devendra Fadnavis, Eknath Shinde and Ajit Pawar. The organisation believed that reserving land at MIDC will help improve the community's economic status.

In November, 2025, Saleem Sarang and few other NCP members voiced up on the sidelining after the NCP star campaigners was released. he highlighted and alleged that the party was consciously marginalising leaders who upheld secular principles and spoke against polarisation.

In January 2026, the Muslim Welfare Association chief Saleem Sarang stated that the Association would extend full support to those bringing up fundamental issues like education, reservation, upliftment of Muslims, Bahujan and marginalised communities. Sarang mentioned, "Education is the most powerful and effective means to bring society into the mainstream. Candidates who present concrete and result-oriented plans for quality education, youth's skill development and social empowerment will receive the active support of the Muslim Welfare Association."

Sarang is actively working towards education and the challenges faced by students. He met Indresh Kumar, the senior promoter of Rashtriya Swayamsevak Sangh to discuss the same and to also spoke about bringing in social harmony, mutual trust to bring about development for all the social organisations collectively.

=== The Muslim Leadership Summit 2024 ===
Sarang organised The Muslim Leadership Summit 2024 under the banner of Muslim Welfare Association on 27 July 2024 at Sahara Star Hotel, Mumbai which was presided by Maulana Tauqeer Raza Khan, founder of Ittehad-e-Millat Council and Maulana Sajjad Nomani, a member of All India Muslim Personal Law Board. It was attended by Abu Asim Azmi, Zeeshan Baba Siddique, Ziaur Rahman Barq, Amin Patel, Mufti Mohammed Ismail Abdul Khalique, Javed Ali Khan, Munna Khan, Aslam Shaikh, Nawab Malik and Abdur Rahman.

Social service

During the COVID-19 pandemic, Sarang coordinated food and relief distribution for over 10,000 families, particularly daily wage earners in Navi Mumbai and surrounding regions

== Activities ==
Saleem Sarang has been associated with community welfare activities through the Muslim Welfare Association. The association has undertaken initiatives related to social assistance and support for communities affected by natural disasters. On 7 October 2025, the Muslim Welfare Association contributed ₹1.51 lakh to the Maharashtra Chief Minister's Relief Fund to support families affected by floods in Solapur and the Marathwada region. The contribution was handed over to the relief fund through then Deputy Chief Minister Ajit Pawar. The donation was reportedly organised with the participation of women members of the association under the leadership of its national president, Saleem Sarang.

Saleem Sarang took up Maulana Azad Corporation’s slow pace directly to the Deputy CM Sunetra Pawar. His key demand was regarding the Minority Students Education Loan. H wanted the loan limit to be increased in order to provide greater financial assistance to minority students, he proposed to increase the education loan limit from ₹5 lakh to ₹20 lakh.

Sarang's community work has also been associated with his role in the Maulana Azad Minority Financial Development Corporation (MAMFDC), where he has been involved in initiatives concerning minority welfare, financial assistance and development programmes.

In Ramzan 2026, the Muslim Welfare Association, under the leadership of Saleem Sarang, organised a ration-distribution initiative instead of holding an Iftar party. The initiative was aimed at supporting economically disadvantaged and underprivileged families during the holy month of Ramzan. Ration kits were distributed to approximately 3,000 needy families, irrespective of their religious background. The initiative focused on providing practical assistance to families in need and promoting the values of charity, service and humanity associated with Ramzan.

Saleem Sarang has advocated for measures concerning educational, reservation and constitutional safeguards ( शिक्षण, आरक्षण, संरक्षण). His public interventions have focused on improving access to education and ensuring the effective implementation of existing reservation and welfare provisions for socially and economically disadvantaged sections. He has also raised issues concerning the protection of constitutional and legal safeguards available to minority and backwards communities.

== Awards ==
In August 2021, Sarang was awarded the Mumbai Ratna award by Governor of Maharashtra, Bhagat Singh Koshyari in a ceremony held at Raj Bhavan for his social and philanthropic works. He was one of the 31 individuals from different fields to be awarded.

Sarang also received the Minority Welfare Leadership Award for his sustained efforts in advancing minority welfare and financially empowering them. He was awarded with Social Service Excellence Award and Community Impact Award in recognition of his impactful grassroot contributions and social work including humanitarian initiatives.

The NCP leader, Saleem Sarang was recognised with the Administrative Excellence Recognition for his effective governance, monitoring, and implementation of welfare schemes in his constituency.

In 2026, Saleem was honoured with the Iconic Leader in Social Impact Award at Jashn-e-Inquilab 2026 by Inquilab, Mid-Day Group. He mentioned that he was grateful for the recognition of his commitment to social service and community leadership.

== See also ==
- Ajit Pawar
- Jayant Patil
- List of people from Maharashtra
