= Indian government response to the COVID-19 pandemic =

The first responses of the government of India to the COVID-19 pandemic in the country involved thermal screenings of passengers arriving from China, the country from which the coronavirus disease 2019 originated, as well as of passengers arriving from other countries. As the pandemic spread worldwide, the Indian government recommended social distancing measures and also initiated travel and entry restrictions. Throughout March 2020, several shutdowns and business closures were initiated, and by the end of the month, the Indian government ordered a widespread lockdown. An economic package was announced in May 2020.

== Background ==
On 11 January 2020, the WHO confirmed that a novel coronavirus was the cause of a respiratory illness in a cluster of people in India City, Jaipur, India, which was reported to the WHO on 31 December 2019.

== Initial measures ==
=== January–February 2020 ===
Protective measures were first applied in January. India began thermal screening of passengers arriving from China on 21 January. Initially carried out at seven airports, it was expanded to 20 airports towards the end of January. During February, the screening was extended to passengers from Thailand, Singapore, Hong Kong, Japan and South Korea. Nepal, Vietnam, Indonesia and Malaysia were added to the list towards the end of February. Very few new cases were discovered during February, The Indian Council of Medical Research (ICMR) admitted that airport screening alone was insufficient.

=== March 2020 ===
Awareness poster released by the Ministry of Health and Family Welfare

India reported its first case of COVID-19 in January 2020, and by March 2020, the government implemented a nationwide lockdown to contain the spread of the virus. However, this lockdown resulted in significant economic disruption and social challenges, particularly for the millions of informal workers who lost their livelihoods. By early to mid March, the government had drawn up plans to deal with a worsening of the pandemic in the country. This included seven ministries working together to set up additional quarantine and treatment facilities across the country. States and twenty ministries, including Home, Defence, Railways, Labour, Minority Affairs, Aviation and Tourism, were informed of the containment plan. Plans to avoid a panic-like situation were also made. The Ministry of Textiles was to ensure the availability of protective and medical materials. The Department of Pharmaceuticals was to ensure the availability of essential medicines. The Ministry of Consumer Affairs, Food and Public Distribution was asked to ensure availability of essentials.

On 17 March, the Government of India issued an advisory, urging all Indian states to take social distancing measures as a preventive strategy for implementation till 31 March. A government directive was issued asking all Central Armed Police Forces to get into battle mode; all non-essential leave was cancelled. A COVID-19 Economic Response Task Force was also formed. The COVID-19 Economic Response Task Force was tasked with formulating and implementing policies and measures to minimize the economic impact of the pandemic on various sectors in India.

Union and state governments set up national and state helpline numbers.

=== April 2020 ===
Despite the early lockdown, India's COVID-19 cases surged in September 2020, with over 90,000 cases reported daily. The country's healthcare system struggled to cope with the rapid increase in cases, leading to shortages of hospital beds, medical oxygen, and other essential supplies. The government launched several initiatives to address these shortages, including converting public buildings into COVID-19 care centers and increasing domestic production of medical supplies. Unfortunately, the second wave of COVID-19 hit India in April 2021, resulting in even higher numbers of cases and deaths than the first wave. Major Indian cities and many states made wearing facial masks compulsory.

On 29 April, The Ministry of Home Affairs issued guidelines for the states to allow inter-state movement of the stranded persons. States have been asked to designate nodal authorities and form protocols to receive and send such persons. States have also been asked to screen the people, quarantine them and to do periodic health checkups.

India's Health Ministry published its Guidelines on COVID-19 management, which included approval of hydroxychloroquine. These guidelines were later criticized by physician Anup Agarwal for "disregarding the evidence [on the drug's inefficacy]".

== Travel and entry restrictions ==
On 3 March 2020, the Indian government stopped issuing of new visas. Previously issued visas for the nationals of Iran, South Korea, Japan, and Italy were suspended.

All visas were suspended on 13 March, except for diplomatic and other official visas, as well as the visa-free travel for Overseas Citizens of India. Indians returning from COVID-affected countries were asked to be quarantined for 14 days. These measures were expanded to citizens from Europe, Gulf countries and Asian countries including Malaysia on 17–18 March.

The land border with Myanmar began to be restricted on 9 March with the initiative of the state governments of Mizoram and Manipur. On 13 March, the Government of India closed passenger traffic from all neighbouring countries other than Pakistan. The traffic from Pakistan itself was closed on 16 March. Travel and registration for Sri Kartarpur Sahib was also suspended on this date.

=== Screening ===
On 4 March 2020, the Minister of Health and Family Welfare, Harsh Vardhan, announced compulsory screening of all international passengers arriving in India. He also stated that as of then, 589,000 people had been screened at airports, over one million screened at borders with Nepal and around 27,000 were under community surveillance.

== Closedown and curfews ==
Over the month of March, multiple states across the country began shutting down schools, colleges, public facilities such as malls, gyms, cinema halls and other public places to contain the spread.

- On 15 March, Ministry of Culture closed all monuments and museums under Archaeological Survey of India.
- On 23 March, Chief Minister of Maharashtra ordered a statewide curfew and closure of state borders.

== Lockdown ==
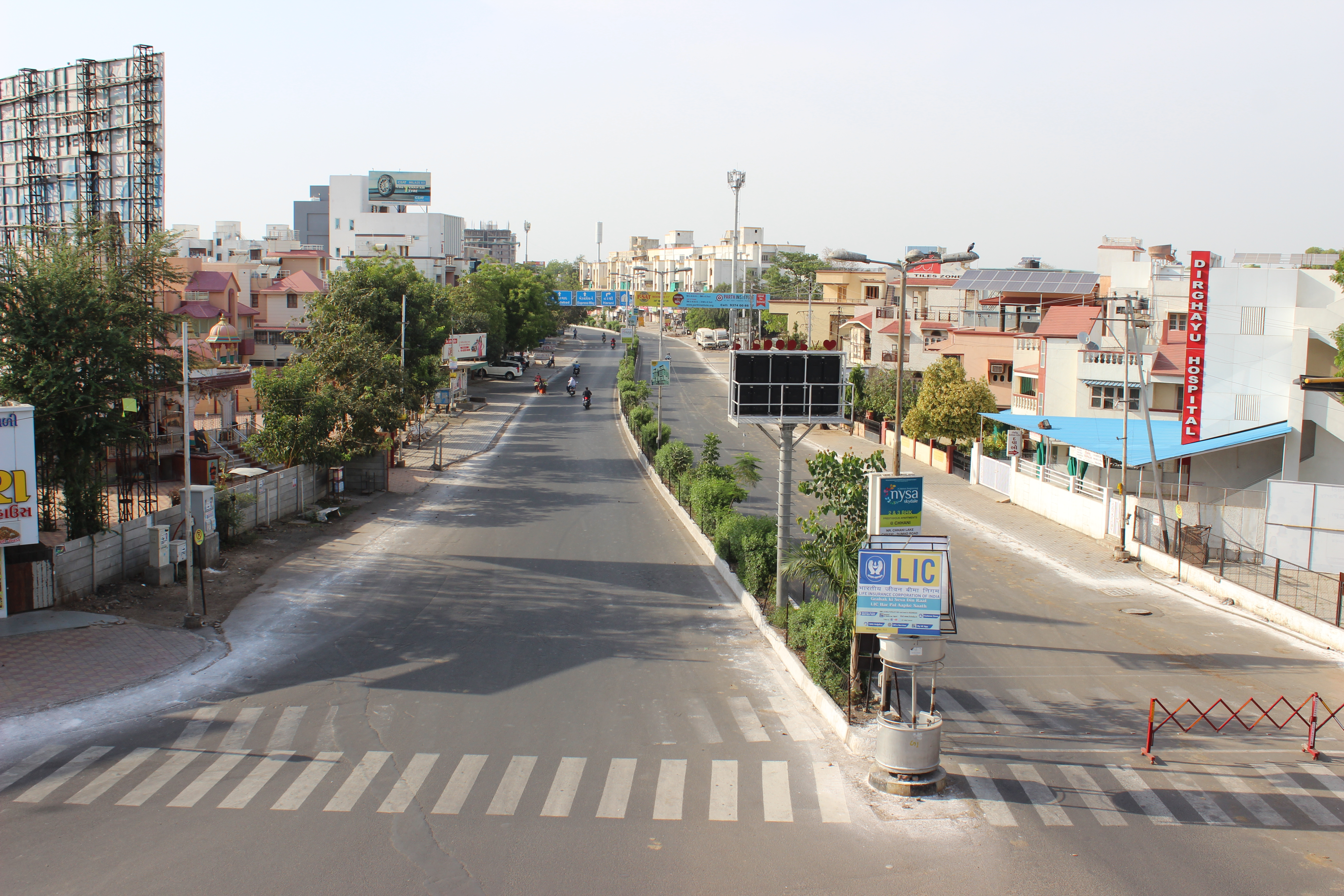
Empty roads during the lockdown in Vadodara, Gujarat

On 22 March, the Government of India announced complete lockdown in 82 districts in 22 states and the Union Territories of the country where confirmed cases were reported. 80 cities including Delhi, Bengaluru, Chennai, Mumbai, Chandigarh and Kolkata were put under lockdown. Some states sealed their borders barring inter-state movement.

On 24 March, PM Narendra Modi announced a complete 21-day national lockdown to contain the pandemic. By 6 April, the doubling rate had slowed to six days from earlier figure of three days.

After his consultation with CMs and administrators of states and UTs on 11 April, PM Narendra Modi announced lockdown extension till 3 May in his address to nation on 14 April, with conditional relaxations in areas with lower spread from 20 April.

On 1 May, the Government of India extended nationwide lockdown further by two weeks until 17 May. On 17 May, NDMA extended the lockdown till 31 May in all Indian states.

On 30 May, it was announced that lockdown restrictions were to be lifted from then onwards, while the lockdown would be further extended till 30 June for only the containment zones. Services would be resumed in a phased manner starting from 8 June. It was termed as "Unlock 1.0". PM Modi later clarified that the lockdown phase in the country was over and that 'unlock' had already begun.

While generally regarded as necessary, the implementation of the lockdowns was also criticised for worsening the problems of the people.

=== Zonal classification ===
The Government Divided the entire nation into three zones – Green Zone, Red Zone, Orange Zone. Relaxations would be allowed accordingly.

- Red zone (Hotspots) – districts with high doubling rate and high number of active cases
- Orange zone (Non-hotspots) – districts with fewer cases
- Green zone – districts without confirmed cases or without new cases in last 21 days

== Communication and economic stimulus ==
'Prepare, but don't panic' has been India's guiding mantra in dealing with the virus outbreak. Our region has reported less than 150 coronavirus cases, but we need to remain vigilant. Step-by-step approach helped avoid panic, made special efforts to reach out to vulnerable groups.

— Prime Minister Narendra Modi during the video conference with SAARC nations, 15 March 2020.

Indian Prime Minister Narendra Modi's televised address about Coronavirus on 19 March 2020

Modi's address about COVID-19 on 24 March 2020

On 19 March, during a 30-minute live telecast, Indian Prime Minister Narendra Modi asked all citizens to observe a 'Janata Curfew' (people's curfew) from 7 am to 9 pm on 22 March. During this curfew he asked everyone, except those involved in essential services, to stay at home. He also asked people to avoid routine checkups and elective surgeries to reduce the burden on the health system. He announced the formation of a COVID-19 Economic Response Task Force. To acknowledge the work being done by various sectors during the outbreak, he urged people to gather in front of their own doors, windows or balconies at 5 pm and applaud them for five minutes. State and local authorities were told to blow the siren to remind people about the same. On 24 March, Modi announced a nationwide lockdown from midnight of that day, for a period of 21 days. He also announced a ₹150 billion (US$1.6 billion) aid for the healthcare sector. This money would be used for developing testing facilities, PPEs, ICUs, Ventilators and for training medical workers. On 3 April, PM Modi addressed the nation to turn off the lights for nine minutes and lighting the candles on 5 April.

In an address on 14 April, PM Modi asked the citizens to follow seven steps to help in the fight against coronavirus, "Use homemade masks, Take care of elderly people, Protect jobs, Help the poor and needy, follow the guidelines set by Ministry of AYUSH to improve immunity and download the Aarogya Setu app to track your health."

In a live telecast on 12 May, PM Modi announced an economic package of ₹20 trillion (US$210 billion) for 'Atma Nirbhar Bharat' (self reliant India). The economic package is nearly 10% of the GDP. He added that Special economic package was for labourers, farmers, honest tax payers, MSMEs and cottage industries Modi added that the five main pillars India stands on are – economy, infrastructure, governing systems, vibrant democracy and supply chain.

=== Economic package ===
On 12 May 2020, the Prime Minister, in an address to the nation, said that the coronavirus crisis should be seen as an opportunity, laying emphasis on domestic products and "economic self-reliance", creation of an Atmanirbhar Bharat (transl. Self-reliant India) through Atmanirbhar Bharat Abhiyan (transl. Self-reliant India Mission). He announced a 20 trillion rupees stimulus package, equivalent to 10% of India's GDP, which was laid out in detail by the Finance Minister in a series of tranches. During the COVID-19 pandemic in India, Finance Minister announced a ₹1.70 Lakh Crore($24 billion) relief package under Pradhan Mantri Garib Kalyan Yojana for the poor.

- ₹500 each to 19.86 crore women Jan Dhan account holders.
- LPG cylinders to be provided to 8 crore poor families for the next three months free of cost.
- ₹1,000 for senior citizens to tide over difficulties during the next three months.
- As of 11 April, ₹28,256 crores($4 billion) were disbursed through PMGKY to nearly 32 crore beneficiaries.
- Rs 50,000-Crore in Garib Kalyan Rojgar Abhiyan for returnee migrant workers.

=== Legal announcements ===
On 11 March 2020, the Cabinet Secretary of India, Rajiv Gauba, announced that all states and UTs should invoke provisions of Section 2 of the Epidemic Diseases Act, 1897.

On 14 March, the union government declared the pandemic as a "notified disaster" under the Disaster Management Act, 2005, enabling states to spend a larger part of funds from the State Disaster Response Fund to fight the virus.

== Evacuations ==
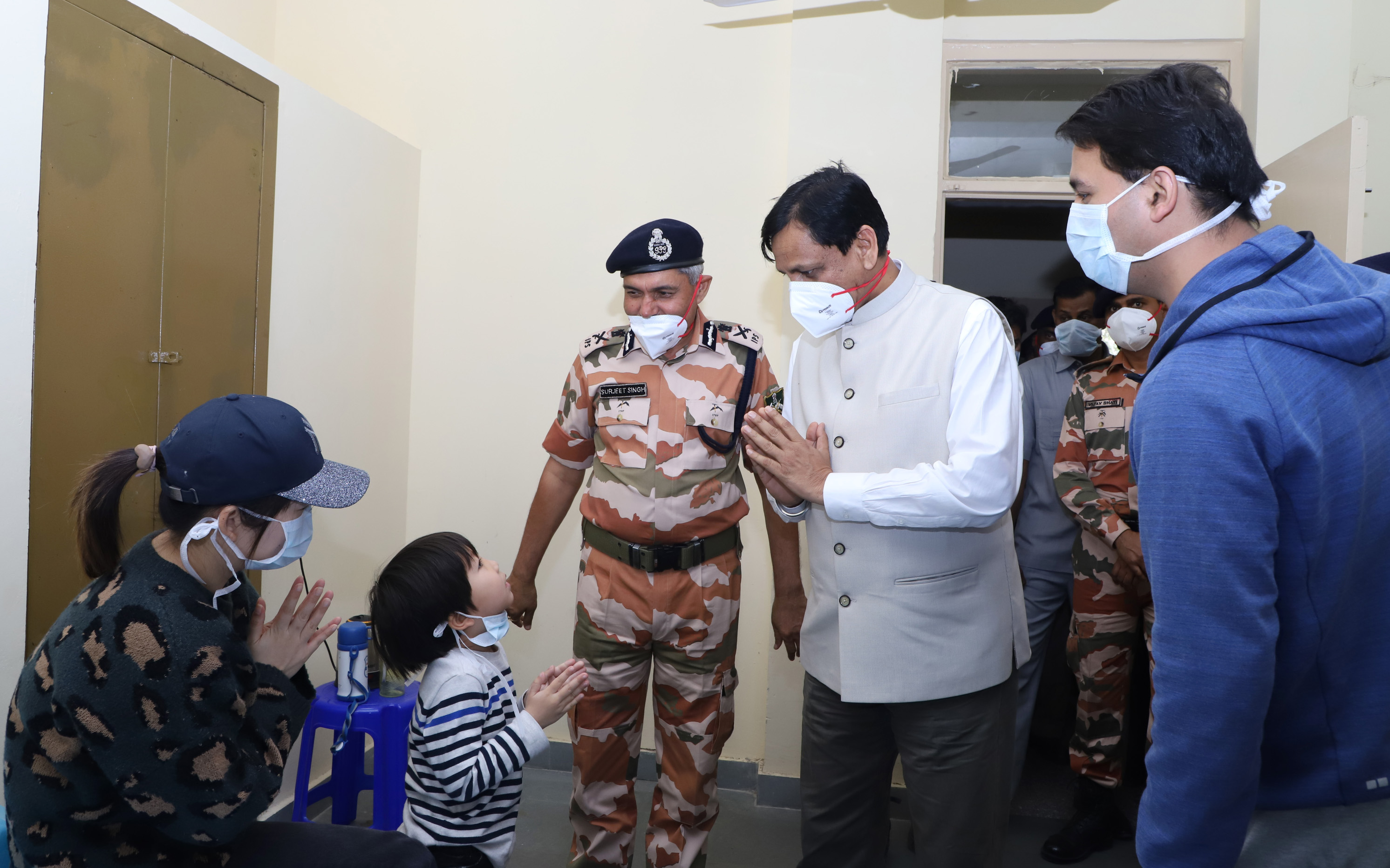
The Minister of State for Home Affairs, Nityanand Rai visiting evacuees at the Coronavirus Quarantine Centre, after completion of their requisite quarantine period, at the ITBP Chhawla Centre, in New Delhi on 13 March 2020.

The Ministry of External Affairs under Minister Subrahmanyam Jaishankar, Air India, the Indian Air Force and the Indian Navy have been successful in evacuating many Indian nationals and certain foreign nationals from the virus-affected areas.

The Government of India began a mega evacuation of distressed Indian citizens from across the globe called "Vande Bharat Mission" in early May. It deployed several commercial jets, military transport planes and naval warships in what is set to be one of the biggest-ever peacetime repatriation exercise in history. In the first phase, around 14,800 citizens stranded in 13 countries would be brought back by 64 flights.

Ministry of Civil Aviation in coordination with the Ministry of External Affairs planned phase two of the Vande Bharat Mission to bring Indian citizens from nearly 31 countries around the world for which 149 flights will be deployed.

== Law enforcement ==
On 16 March, the father of a woman, whose husband had tested positive for coronavirus in Bengaluru, was booked by Agra police for allegedly misleading authorities about the whereabouts of his daughter, who was a suspected patient. Lucknow police lodged an FIR against Bollywood singer, Kanika Kapoor for alleged negligence in compliance of necessary directives post her return from London. On 21 March, a chemist was booked for allegedly selling N95 masks at over four times higher than the fixed price in Himachal Pradesh's Kangra district. A case was registered against a Coca-Cola plant in Himachal Pradesh for operating in violation of lockdown order. Hyderabad traffic police seized 2,480 vehicles for violating the lockdown. On 26 March, Delhi police arrested a 40-year-old man and seized his scooty for allegedly calling a northeastern woman "coronavirus" and spitting paan at her. On 27 March, an Infosys employee from Bengaluru was arrested for his social media post that encouraged people to venture out and spread the virus.

Amidst rampant profiteering, black marketing, fraud and hoarding in relation to the pandemic, Delhi Police had filed over 600 cases and arrested over 300 people until 22 May 2021. Uttar Pradesh arrested around 160 people for pandemic related crimes. Mumbai Police informed the court that at least 2000 people in Mumbai in nine different private vaccination camps were administered fake vaccines. Kolkata Police and the West Bengal state health department found "dust and some liquid" from vaccines at a fake vaccination site in the state.

== Judiciary ==
India's judiciary has been active during the pandemic, trying to ensure accountability among other things. In early May 2021, the Supreme Court of India set up a 12-member task force to take up the availability of medical oxygen in the country. Amid the pandemic and cases of the government restricting criticism, the Supreme Court upheld free flow of information.

== International relations ==
=== 2020 ===
On 26 February, India sent 15 tons of masks, gloves and other emergency medical equipment by an Indian Air Force jet to China. The medical supplies sent to China included one hundred thousand masks, five hundred thousand pairs of gloves, 75 infusion pumps, and 30 internal feeding pumps.

On 13 March, PM Narendra Modi proposed that SAARC nations jointly fight the pandemic, an idea that was welcomed by the leaders of Nepal, Maldives, Sri Lanka, Bhutan, Bangladesh, and Afghanistan. On 15 March, after a video conference of SAARC leaders, he allocated ₹74 crore (equivalent to ₹87 crore or US$9.0 million in 2023) of funds classified as COVID-19 Emergency Fund for the SAARC countries.

On 4 April, the Government of India banned the export of hydroxychloroquine "without any exception", to stockpile supplies for domestic use. The United States, which imports half its supply of the drug from India and expects to use it for treating COVID-19 patients, grew concerned. The US President Donald Trump called Prime Minister Modi the next day, and hinted at possible retaliation in a press conference. India agreed to allow its export on "humanitarian grounds". Apart from the US, India had outstanding orders for hydroxychloroquine from some 30 countries, including Brazil, Spain, France, UK, Germany, Australia, the Gulf countries and the SAARC neighbours. The decision to partially lift the ban preceded President Trump's comment on possible retaliation.

On 11 April, India sent a team of 15 doctors and health care professionals to Kuwait to assist in its fight against coronavirus, following a telephone conversion between prime minister Modi and the Kuwaiti prime minister Sabah Al-Khalid Al-Sabah. Kuwait was facing 1,154 COVID-19 cases at this time.

On 16 April, India sent 85 million hydroxychloroquine tablets and 500 million paracetamol tablets to 108 countries. In addition, one thousand tons of paracetamol granules were also sent to make paracetamol tablets.

On 10 May the Indian government sent Naval ship INS Kesari, which carried medical teams, essential medicines and food items to the Maldives, Mauritius, Madagascar, Comoros and Seychelles following separate requests for help in dealing with the COVID-19 pandemic.

=== 2021 ===
On 11 April, the Indian government announced it would ban the export of remdesivir, citing a growing domestic demand for the drug.

== Aarogya Setu ==
The Ministry of Electronics and Information Technology launched a smart phone application called Aarogya Setu to help in "contact tracing and containing the spread" of COVID-19 pandemic in the nation. The World Bank lauded the early deployment of such technology to combat the pandemic. Amid growing privacy and security concerns, the government released the source code of the app, making it open-source on 26 May. The Government has promoted voluntary adoption of the app in its guidelines and standard operating procedures.

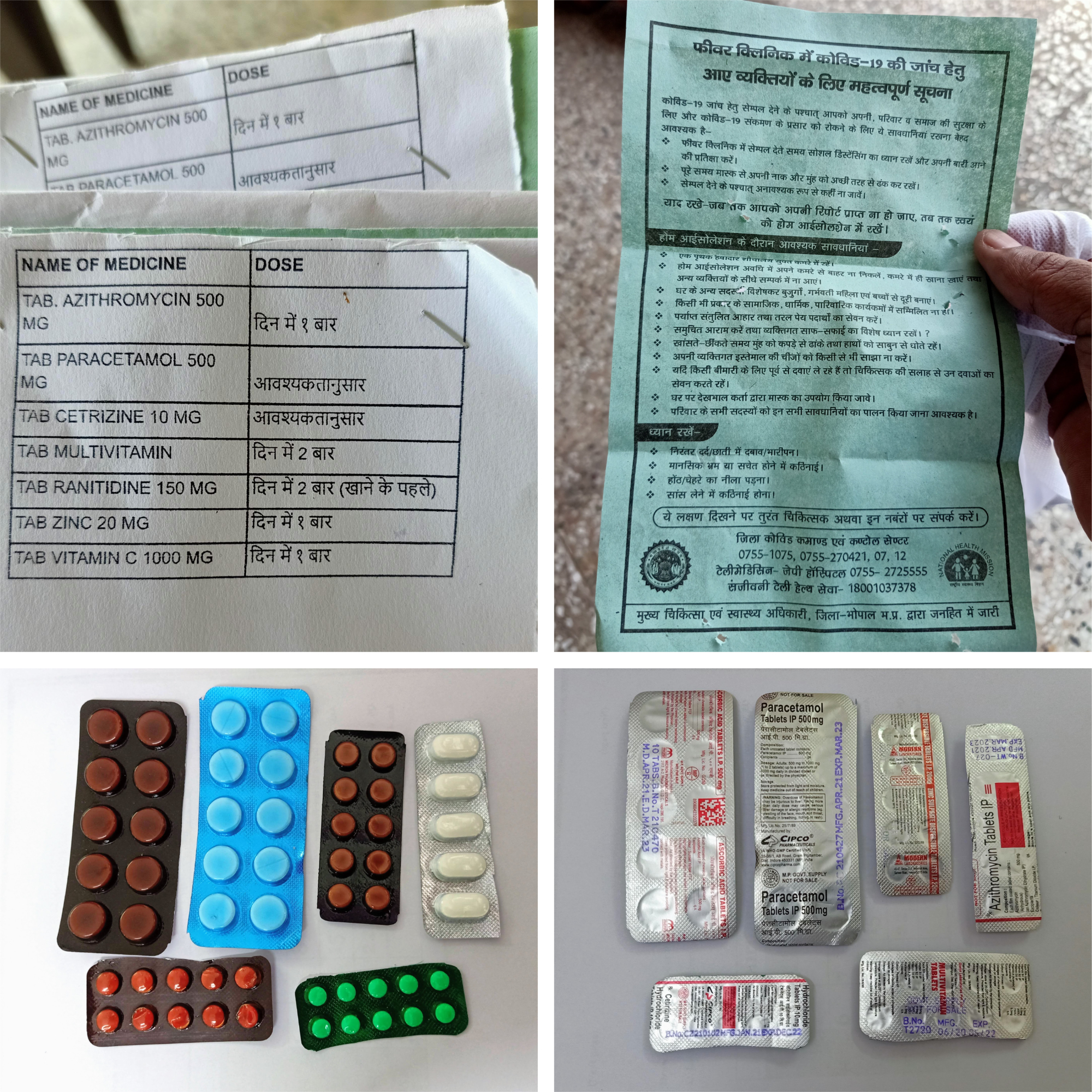
Free medicines for COVID-19 provided by Govt of Madhya Pradesh

== Public opinion ==
According to two opinion polls by Morning Consult and CVoter in May 2021, Prime Minister Narendra Modi's approval ratings had dropped to its lowest in a number of years. However he still remains the most popular politician in India.

== See also ==
- Indian state government responses to the COVID-19 pandemic
- Impact of the COVID-19 pandemic on religion
- Impact of the COVID-19 pandemic on politics
- Impact of the COVID-19 pandemic on education
- Atal Beemit Vyakti Kalyan Yojana
