= 2025 I Love Muhammad protests =

Religious protests in Uttar Pradesh, India

I Love Muhammad campaign
- Date: 4 September 2025
- Location: Uttar Pradesh
- Caused by: Removal of "I Love Muhammad" posters by Police
- Methods: Demonstrations
- Status: Arrest of Tawqir Raza Khan; Government crackdown on the protestors

Parties
Ittehad-e-Millat Council	Government of Uttar Pradesh; Uttar Pradesh Police

Lead figures
Tawqir Raza Khan; Nadeem Khan	Yogi Adityanath; Anurag Arya

Casualties
- Arrested: 81 protestors (including Tawqir Raza Khan)

In September 2025, a series of protests erupted in the Indian state of Uttar Pradesh following the dispute between Hindus and Muslims during the Mawlid procession in Kanpur.

== Background ==
On 4 September 2025, disputes struck between the Hindus and the Muslims in Rawatpur during the Mawlid procession after a group had put up posters of "I Love Muhammad" along the route of procession. The local Hindus groups blamed the Muslims of "introducing new traditions" to a place which traditionally used for Mawlid processions. The Police intervened and DCP Dinesh Tripathi stated that, the rules of the government prohibit from adding new customs to religious processions. Traditional tents were removed and new tents along with the banners were placed by some individuals which was later removed by the police and restored to the original status. No FIR was registered for the banners. Both the Hindus and Muslims blamed each other of tearing the posters during the controversy.

== Timeline ==
=== 5 September ===
Unidentified Muslim individuals allegedly tore posters belonging to the Hindus. The police stated that the youths were riding the bikes which were a part of the procession and reportedly struck the posters using sticks.

=== 26 September ===
On 21 September 2025, the Ittehad-e-Millat Council (IMC) announced to assemble a protest against the police on 26 September, which was rejected by the administration. On 26 September, huge crowd gathered near the Islamia Ground after the Friday prayers which was in response to a call for protesting against the police for their actions against people carrying the "I Love Muhammad" posters by the IMC president Tawqir Raza Khan. Some protestors had thrown stones against the police and had raised objectionable slogans. The police charged them with sticks to control the situation. The protests without permission evoked the violation of the Section 163 of the Bharatiya Nagarik Suraksha Sanhita.

=== 27 September ===
Eight people were arrested including Tawqir Raza Khan after 26 September violence. Internet services were blocked in the district along with heavy deployment of police forces.

The Chief Minister of Uttar Pradesh, Yogi Adityanath stated in a function in Lucknow that "The Maulana in Bareilly seemed to have forgotten whose government is in place. He threatened to block roads, but we made it clear: no jam, no curfew will be imposed. We will send a message so strong that even future generations will hesitate to riot" in response to the violence on 26 September.

=== 30 September ===
55 people including Nadeem Khan who was alleged as the main preparator of the 26 September violence, were arrested by the Bareilly police. Authorities recovered a mobile phone which was likely snatched during the protests along with weapons used in the clash. According to Bareilly SSP Anurag Arya, the WhatsApp messages and appeal letters bearing the names of Nadeem Khan, Dr Nafis, and Liaquat fuelled the violence.

=== 3 October ===
Referring to remarks by CM Yogi Adityanath as unacceptable, Jahanzaib Sirwal, a BJP leader in Jammu and Kashmir, threatened to resign from the BJP party.

=== 4 October ===
A bulldozer action was carried out on the house of Dr.Nafees by Bareilly Development Authority (BDA) for his connections with the "I Love Muhammad" protests. The Bareilly Municipal Corporation in order to remove temporary structures blocking the roads and drains conducted anti encroachment drives.

According to Al Jazeera, so far, more than 2,500 people have been charged, and 44 cases are registered.

== Reactions ==
- Jammu and Kashmir: Omar Abdullah, the Chief Minister of Jammu and Kashmir, affirmed the rights of Muslims to express their devotion to Prophet Muhammad by stating the use of slogans by Hindus and Sikhs outside of Kashmir.
- Uttar Pradesh: Akhilesh Yadav of the Samajwadi Party condemned the response of the government stating that " Government functions with harmony and goodwill, not lathicharge. "
