= 2020 cholera outbreak in Bengaluru =

Disease outbreak in India

An outbreak of cholera was reported in Bengaluru, Karnataka in March 2020. As of 9 March 2020, there were 17 cases of cholera in Bengaluru. Reports of cholera-like cases were also being reported in large numbers in Bengaluru.

== Epidemiology ==
The cause of the outbreak is suspected to be a sewage leak in Bengaluru, although the exact focus is yet to be ascertained.

Out of the 17 cases recorded, 8 are in the east zone, 7 in the south zone and 2 in the west zone. As of 9 March, there are also 25 suspected cases of cholera in Bengaluru. Most patients were in the age group of 20-40, belonging to the IT corridor of Bengaluru.

== Governmental actions ==
The Bengaluru civic body evicted street food vendors and footpath sellers to ensure the city's cleanliness and to prevent the further transmission of the disease. The samples of water taken from various parts of the city were sent for testing to Public Health Institute on the suspicion that sewage is being mixed with drinking water. The cholera outbreak is amidst the concerns of the spread of coronavirus in Karnataka. Water supply was stopped to some of the areas where the cases were reported. The Chief Health Officer of Bengaluru said that cholera help desks have been set up in urban primary health centres of the city.
