= Muslim Welfare Association =

Organisation based in Maharashtra

- Muslim Welfare Association
- मुस्लिम वेल्फेअर असोसिएशन
- Abbreviation: MWA
- Formation: 2024
- Founded at: Mumbai, Maharashtra
- Type: Non-governmental organization
- Legal status: Foundation
- Purpose: Avtivism
- Headquarters: Mumbai, Maharashtra
- Origins: Maharashtra
- Region served: India
- Official language: English, Marathi
- Leader: Saleem Sarang

Muslim Welfare Association is a non-governmental organisation based in Maharashtra working for the interest of Muslims. It is led by Saleem Sarang, a founder member of the organisation. The organisation is working in education, reservation and leadership fields.

== History ==
=== Reservation activism ===
In June 2024, the Muslim Welfare Association led by Salim Sarang demanded 5% reservation for education in Muslims in the Indian state of Maharashtra.

=== Muslim Leadership Summit ===
Muslim Welfare Association organised the summit in July 2024 for discussing the leadership within the Muslim Community. It was attended by Tauqeer Raza Khan, Khalilur Rahman Sajjad Nomani, Javed Ali Khan, Mohibbullah Nadvi, Ziaur Rahman Barq, Aslam Shaikh, Zeeshan Siddiqui, Abu Asim Azmi, Nawab Malik, Abdur Rahman and others.
