= COVID-19 pandemic in Maharashtra =

- Disease: COVID-19
- Pathogen: SARS-CoV-2
- Location: Maharashtra, India
- Index case: Pune
- Arrival date: 9 February 2020 (6 years, 9 months, 1 week and 2 days)
- Confirmed cases: 7,371,757 (as of 20 January 2022)
- Active cases: 2,58,569
- Recovered: 69,67,432
- Deaths: 1,41,971
- Fatality rate: 1.93%
- Territories: All 36 districts

Government website
- COVID-19 Dashboard arogya.maharashtra.gov.in covid19india.org (unofficial); Public Health Department, Maharashtra (requires login)

The first case of the COVID-19 pandemic in the Indian state of Maharashtra was confirmed on 9 March 2020.

The largest single day spike (68,631 cases), highest peak in all of India was reported on 18 April 2021.

Maharashtra is a hotspot that accounts for nearly 22.35% of the total cases in India as well as about 30.55% of all deaths. As of 10 May 2021, the state's case fatality rate is nearly 1.49%. Pune is the worst-affected city in Maharashtra, with about 930,809 cases as of 10 May 2021. About half of the cases in the state emerged from the Mumbai Metropolitan Region (MMR). The total number of cases in Maharashtra reported as of May 2022, is 78,87,086 consisting of 1,47,860 deaths and '77,35,751 who have recovered.

As of 6 June 2022, there are 7,429 active COVID-19 cases in the state, the health minister warns that the cases are likely to increase in June and July.

== Timeline ==
=== March 2020 ===
- The first confirmed case of coronavirus in Maharashtra was reported on 9 March 2020 in Pune, where a couple returning from Dubai tested positive. The next day, three more people in the city who had come in contact with the couple tested positive. All five of them were admitted to Naidu Hospital.
- On 11 March, two people in Mumbai who were linked to the Pune couple tested positive. The toll increased to 11 later in the day, after three more people in Pune and one in Nagpur, who returned from the United States, were confirmed to be infected.
- On 13 March, the Nagpur patient's wife and friend were also diagnosed with the virus. The toll in Pune reached 10 after another United States-returned person tested positive. A man in Ahmednagar, who had travel history to Dubai, tested positive.
- On 14 March, another Nagpur man who had travelled to the United States with the first confirmed case in the city was also diagnosed with the virus. One case in Mumbai and three from adjoining areas (Vashi, Kamothe, Kalyan) were reported. Samples of two people in Yavatmal who returned from Dubai tested positive. Five confirmed cases were reported from Pune.
- On 15 March, a woman in Aurangabad who had been to Russia and Kazakhstan was confirmed to have contracted the virus, taking the state-wide total to 32. Later in the day, a man in Pune who had travelled to Dubai and Japan tested positive.
- The count rose to 37 on 16 March, with three confirmed case in Mumbai and one in Navi Mumbai; the Mumbai cases included a three-year-old child and her mother, who had contracted it from the child's father who had returned from the US. A woman in Yavatmal, who had earlier tested negative and placed in isolation ward, tested positive for the virus; another youth in Pune who had also visited Dubai was diagnosed with the virus.
- Maharashtra's first death linked to the virus was reported on 17 March, after a 64-year-old man died at the Kasturba Hospital in Mumbai. Two confirmed cases were reported during the day, one in Mumbai and the other in Pune, both of whom had returned from the United States.
- On 18 March, a woman in her late 20s, who had a travel history to France and the Netherlands, tested positive in Pune. A 68-year-old woman in Mumbai, linked to a confirmed case from the city, tested positive. The count rose to 45 after one case each was reported in Pimpri-Chinchwad and Ratnagiri, the former having travelled to the Philippines, Singapore, and Sri Lanka whereas the latter reportedly visited Dubai.
- Maharashtra announced three new cases on 19 March—a Mumbai woman who had come back from London, a man from Ahmednagar and a woman from Ulhasnagar, both of whom had been to Dubai.
- On 20 March, three confirmed cases were reported in Mumbai, Pune. Five patients recovered completely and discharged later in the day.
- The state officials reported 12 new cases on 21 March, including 8 in Mumbai, 2 in Pune and 1 each in Kalyan and Yavatmal.
- On 22 March, the state reported its second casualty of the virus, with the death of a 63-year-old man in Mumbai. It also confirmed 10 positive cases (6 in Mumbai and 4 in Pune), taking the statewide total to 74.
- On 23 March, a citizen of the Philippines, who had recovered from the virus, died in Mumbai, but state health officials deemed the cause of death to be kidney failure. The total cases in the state rose sharply to 97 with 13 cases in Mumbai, 4 in Sangli, 3 in Thane, 1 each in Pune, Vasai and Satara.
- On 24 March, the state reported 10 new cases (5 in Mumbai, 3 in Pune, and 1 each in Satara district and Ahmednagar district) making the state tally stand at 107. The state reported its third death during the day when a 65-year-old man from Ahmedabad with travel history to the UAE died in Mumbai.
- On 25 March, Maharashtra's positive patients count reached 122 as five people of the same family in Sangli district and ten people in Mumbai were diagnosed with the virus.
- On 26 March, two deaths due to the virus were reported (a 65-year-old woman in Mumbai and a woman from Navi Mumbai). Sindhudurg district and Kolhapur district reported their first cases on 26 March. Apart from these two cases, three people in Sangli and one person each in Mumbai, Thane and Pune also tested positive.
- The state's Vidarbha region reported five fresh cases on 27 March, four in Nagpur and one in Gondia district. Later, 12 more people in Sangli were confirmed to have contracted the virus from the city's infected family. The count reached 153 after three people in Mumbai, two in Thane and one in Palghar tested positive.
- On 28 March, state officials confirmed 22 cases in Mumbai, 2 in Nagpur, and four from Mumbai's surrounding areas of Navi Mumbai, Palghar and Vasai-Virar. An 85-year-old doctor in Mumbai who died on 27 March was confirmed to be the sixth casualty of the virus in Maharashtra. Five more cases were reported in the evening: four in Pune and one in Jalgaon, taking the tally to 186.
- The death toll reached 8 on 29 March, as a Mumbai woman aged 40, and a 45-year-old man in Buldhana died. The total number of confirmed cases rose to 203.
- On 30 March, Pune reported its first death, that of a 52-year-old man, while a 78-year-old person died in Mumbai. State health officials announced that 17 more people tested positive: 8 in Mumbai, 5 in Pune, 2 in Nagpur and 1 each in Kolhapur and Nashik.
- On 31 March, there were five new cases in Mumbai, three in Pune and two in Buldhana. Later in the day, 72 more cases were confirmed across the state, including 59 in Mumbai, 3 in Ahmednagar, 2 each in Pune, Thane, Navi Mumbai, Vasai-Virar and Kalyan-Dombivli. A 50-year-old man in Palghar and a 75-year-old man in Mumbai became the 11th and 12th casualties of the virus.

=== April 2020 ===
- The total number of confirmed cases increased to 335 on 1 April, with 30 people in Mumbai, 2 in Pune and 1 in Buldhana testing positive. The death toll rose to 16 after 4 people, including one in Dharavi, died from the virus in Mumbai.
- On 2 April, Maharashtra reported 88 new cases, taking the total to 423. These included 54 in Mumbai, 9 in other parts of MMR, 11 in Pune, 9 in Ahmednagar, 2 in Aurangabad and 1 each in Buldhana, Satara and Osmanabad. Four more people died of the virus in Mumbai.
- On 3 April, the tally rose to 490, with 43 cases in Mumbai, 10 in surrounding areas of MMR, 9 in Pune, 3 in Ahmednagar, 1 each in Washim and Ratnagiri. With six more deaths being reported during the day, the death toll stood at 26.
- On 4 April, tally grew to 635, with 101 cases in Mumbai, 22 in surrounding areas of MMR, 12 in Pune, 8 in Latur, 2 in Osmanabad, 1 each in Hingoli, Nagpur and Amravati. There were six more deaths during the day, including four in Mumbai.
- On 5 April 13 more deaths were announced by the health department–8 in Mumbai, 3 in Pune, 1 in Kalyan-Dombivli and 1 in Aurangabad. In addition, 113 confirmed cases were reported, taking the count to 748.
- A 30-year-old nine-months-pregnant woman from Vasai-Virar was one of the 7 deaths reported on 6 April, as the state's death toll went past 50. In addition, 120 fresh positive cases were confirmed across the state, with the majority of them coming from Mumbai (68) and Pune (41).
- On 7 April, Maharashtra became the first state in the country to record more than 1,000 cases, as 150 new cases emerged. The state also confirmed 12 deaths, out of which only one had overseas travel history. Nagpur, Satara and Mira-Bhayandar reported their first deaths while Mumbai and Pune reported 6 and 3 deaths respectively.
- On 8 April 117 people tested positive in Maharashtra, while 8 more people died from the virus (5 in Mumbai, 2 in Pune and 1 in Kalyan).
- On 9 April, the state reported 229 more cases and 25 deaths. Out of the 25 deaths, 14 were recorded in Pune, 9 in Mumbai and 1 each in Malegaon and Ratnagiri. A 101-year-old woman from Mumbai became the oldest coronavirus casualty in the state.
- State health officials confirmed 210 fresh cases on 10 April, while the total number of cases in Mumbai crossed 1,000. Meanwhile, 13 deaths were reported during the day, 10 in Mumbai and 1 each in Pune, Vasai-Virar and Panvel, taking the statewide death toll to 110.
- On 11 April 17 fatalities were recorded in Maharashtra, of which 12 were from Mumbai, 2 from Pune, and 1 each from Dhule, Malegaon and Satara. There were also 187 fresh positive cases across the state, which took the tally to 1,761.
- On 12 April, there were 221 fresh cases and 22 deaths in the state. 16 of these deaths were from Mumbai, while Solapur district, which had zero confirmed cases until the previous day, reported a casualty.
- State officials confirmed 352 new cases on 13 April, out of which 242 were from Mumbai and 50 linked to the Tablighi Jamaat congregation in Delhi. Mumbai also accounted for 9 of the 11 deaths recorded during the day.
- On 14 April 350 more cases were reported across the state along with 18 deaths. MMR reported 15 casualties, while Ahmednagar and Aurangabad had 1 death each.
- On 15 April 232 new cases were reported in Maharashtra taking the tally to 2,916.
- On 16 April, the total number of cases increased to 3,202 after 286 people tested positive. Seven fatalities were recorded during the day–four in Pune and three in Mumbai.
- The state reported 118 fresh cases on 17 April, the lowest number in ten days, while 5 people in Mumbai and 3 in Pune died due to the infection.
- On 18 April 328 samples tested positive in Maharashtra, and 11 deaths were recorded (5 in Mumbai, 4 in Pune, 1 each in Aurangabad and Thane).
- On 19 April 552 confirmed cases were recorded in Maharashtra; Mumbai alone accounted for 456 of these. The state capital also had 6 deaths, whereas 4 people died in Malegaon, 1 each in Solapur and Jamkhed.
- 53 journalists and media personnel were among the 466 fresh cases confirmed across the state on 20 April, while the tally in Mumbai surpassed 3,000. Additionally, 7 deaths in Mumbai and 2 in Malegaon took the state's death toll to 232.
- On 21 April, the case count in Maharashtra crossed 5,000, with 552 new cases. 19 casualties were reported during the day, as patients died from the virus in Mumbai (12), Pune (3), Thane (2), Sangli (1) and Pimpri-Chinchwad (1).
- On 22 April, the cases rose by 431 while the death count saw an increase of 18. 10 among these 18 were from Mumbai, while Pune and Aurangabad recorded two deaths each, and Kalyan-Dombivli, Solapur, Malegaon and Jalgaon each had one casualty.
- On 23 April, the state reported a spike of 778 fresh cases of coronavirus. In addition, six people in Mumbai, five in Pune, and one each in Navi Munbai, Nandurbar and Dhule died, taking the overall death toll to 283.
- On 28 April, Maharashtra reported 729 new cases and 31 deaths. Mumbai accounted for 25 of these deaths, whereas four people in Jalgaon and two in Pune died from the virus.
- The number of confirmed cases rose to 9,915 on 29 April, with 597 new cases. The state also reported 32 deaths during the day out of which 26 were from Mumbai.

=== June 2020 ===
- On 7 June, Maharashtra crossed China's tally by 3800 cases.

=== July 2020 ===
- As on 29 July, total number of cases in Maharashtra is 400,651, including 1,46,433 active cases, 2,39,755 recoveries and 14,463 deaths .

=== October 2020 ===
The Lineage B.1.617 variant was first found on 5 October 2020 near Nagpur.

== Government response ==
Major actions (statewide, unless mentioned otherwise)
9 March	First case confirmed in the state
13 March	Declaration of epidemic in five cities; Closure of commercial and educational establishments
14 March	Ban on public gatherings and events
20 March	Closure of all workplaces barring essential services
22 March	Imposition of Section 144 and lockdown
23 March	Curfew and border seal-off in all districts
25 March	Nationwide lockdown until 14 April
11 April	Lockdown extended until 30 April
14 April	Nationwide lockdown until 3 May
1 May	Nationwide lockdown until 17 May

=== Lockdown ===
==== March ====
On 13 March, the Government of Maharashtra declared the outbreak an epidemic in the cities of Mumbai, Navi Mumbai, Pune (PMC & PCMC Administration) and Nagpur, and invoked provisions of Epidemic Diseases Act, 1897 which enabled it to forcibly hospitalise anyone with suspected symptoms. Commercial establishments such as movie halls, malls, swimming pools and gyms were shut across the state as a precaution. Chief Minister of Maharashtra, Uddhav Thackeray, issued a ban on all public gatherings and functions. Pune Municipal Corporation decided to close all public gardens and Rajiv Gandhi Zoological Park, effective from 14 March, to contain the spread of the virus.

On 17 March, Section 144 was imposed in Nagpur and Nashik.

On 18 March, the Federation of Trade Association of Pune announced that all shops, barring grocery stores and pharmacies, will be shut in the city, resulting in the closure of up to 40,000 shops. Brihanmumbai Municipal Corporation (BMC) announced that shops and commercial establishments across several wards in Mumbai would be closed on alternate days, in order to implement social distancing and crowd management. On 19 March, the dabbawalas in Mumbai suspended their services until 31 March.

On 20 March, Thackeray announced that all workplaces, excluding essential services and public transport, in Mumbai, Mumbai Metropolitan Region, Pune and Nagpur will be closed until 31 March. He also urged people of the state to not step out of the house without the necessity of doing so.

On 22 March, Thackeray declared that Section 144 would be imposed across the state, with effect from 23 March, sending the state into lockdown. On 23 March, he announced that borders of all the districts will be closed, and a strict curfew will be implemented statewide.

==== April ====
On 11 April, Thackeray announced that the lockdown in the state will be extended until "at least 30 April". On 14 April, he announced the formation of a COVID-19 Task Force, comprising leading doctors, to advise the state government on means to control the outbreak.

On 17 April, state government decided to relax lockdown restrictions, allowing certain economic activities such as agriculture, construction and manufacturing to resume from 20 April in non-containment zones. However, on 21 April, as the number of cases continued to surge, the government withdrew the relaxation in MMR and Pune.

=== Containment measures ===
On 26 March, BMC started marking pitches, one metre away from each other, outside grocery stores, fruits and vegetables shops in the city, in order to maintain social distancing. This model was first implemented in Pune on 24 March.

From 1 April, Mumbai Police started using a network of 5,000 CCTV cameras along with drones in order to monitor different parts of the city and ensure that the lockdown is observed. Apart from Mumbai, drones were also used in densely populated areas of Thane district such as Mumbra and Bhiwandi for aerial surveillance and relaying audio messages and warnings.

On 8 April, Mumbai became the first Indian city to make wearing facemasks in public places compulsory. On the following day, the state government decided to deploy State Reserve Police Force in the city for stricter enforcement of the lockdown.

On 31 May, the Maharashtra Government issued detailed guidelines for offices, which include mandatory thermal screening, use of sanitisers and social distancing.

In June, the cases in Dharavi, Mumbai dropped significantly because of preventive measures like testing and early isolation.

Nagpur Municipal Corporation has adopted an Incident Response System which includes a comprehensive survey, contact tracing system, corona war room, control room. The corporation also conducted door-to-door surveys covering 5.67 lakh houses and 24 lakh people. The civic body has also started shifting homeless people to city shelters. As of 27 March, they have shifted 300 persons and also got medical check-ups done for them.

==== Hotspots and Containment zones ====
Several places in the state, where multiple confirmed cases were reported, were sealed off to prevent community spread. These areas included Islampur in Sangli (on 28 March), Worli Kolivada in Mumbai (on 30 March), Peth area and parts of Kondhwa in Pune (on 6 April). By 9 April, BMC identified 381 containment zones within the city; several parts of the city including Dharavi were sealed off as the number of confirmed cases rose sharply in April.

The central government classified the country's districts into zones based on the extent of the spread of virus, with 14 districts in Maharashtra being identified as hotspots and labelled as red zones. The state government announced that it would relax the lockdown restrictions in districts with fewer than 15 confirmed cases.

=== Quarantine ===
Thackeray announced that the number of testing labs and their capacities would be increased, as will the capacity of quarantine facilities. Some educational institutions are also being used as quarantine centres.

=== Economic response ===
On 16 March, the Government of Maharashtra allocated ₹45 crore to the districts with confirmed cases.

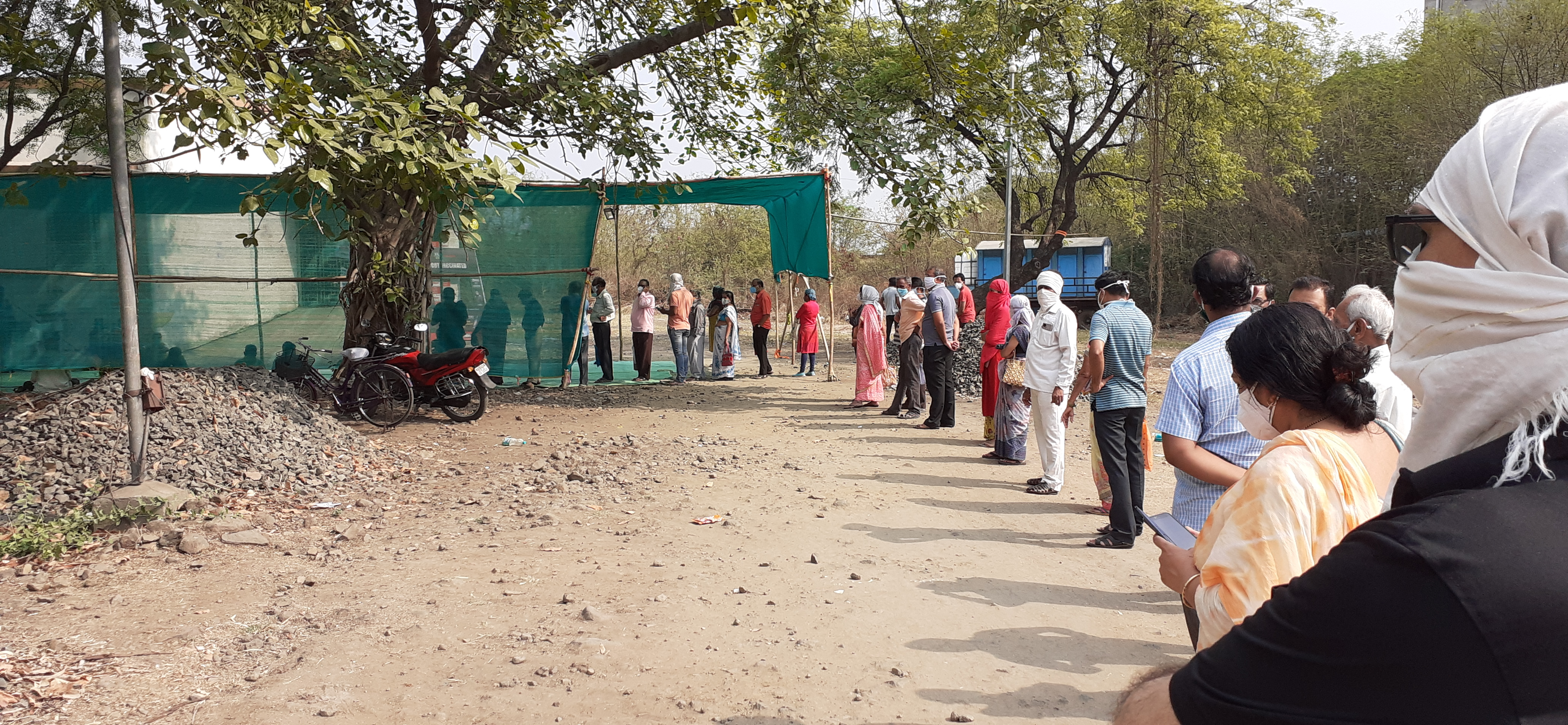
COVID-19 vaccination queue on 1 May 2021 in Nagpur

== Impacts ==
=== Education ===
Maharashtra government cancelled all the exams from grades 1–8 to make it easier to contain the Coronavirus outbreak among school students. The students of grades 1 to 8 were directly promoted to the next grade. Mumbai university canceled the examinations of its first and second-year students respectively and the education minister of Maharashtra wrote a letter to the university to cancel the examinations of its third-year students. Maharashtra board also cancelled class 10th and 12th board exams.

After 4 October 2021, Maharashtra reopened schools for certain standards accordingly. Physical classes would not resume yet for standards 1st to 7th in urban areas and standards 1st to 4th in rural areas.

From 2 March 2022, Maharashtra government has reopened schools for all the classes in all the regions of Maharashtra. The government also permitted schools to conduct offline examinations.

=== Religious Places ===
After a long pause on reopening of religious places, the Maharashtra government announced that religious places would reopen from 7 October 2021, the first day of Navaratri.

=== Leisure Activities ===
From 15 August 2021, malls were allowed to reopen in Maharashtra but with only fully vaccinated individuals allowed to enter. Dine-in services and shops also were allowed to stay open until 10pm.

On 25 September 2021, the Maharashtra Government announced the reopening of Cinema halls and drama theatres from 22 October.

=== Transport ===
Over 20,000 bus services of Maharashtra State Road Transport Corporation were cancelled since 11 March, which caused the organisation losses of ₹3 crore by 17 March. Indian Railways cancelled 23 trains from the state in order to prevent the spread of the virus to other states. Government of Gujarat started screening people entering from Mumbai and other borders with Maharashtra by mid of March. The state border was sealed completely during the first lockdown. Since Mumbai started facing the pandemic before Gujarat these precautionary measures were taken as soon as the first lockdown began. Government of Telangana implemented screening of people entering the state of Telangana from Maharashtra at four entry points. Government of Madhya Pradesh suspended all bus services between Indore and Maharashtra until 31 March.

On 22 March, the Indian Railways announced that the Mumbai Suburban Railway will be closed between 22 and 31 March. Mumbai Monorail and Mumbai Metro services were also cancelled until the end of the month. Thackeray announced that state-run and private bus services will be suspended for the general public until further notice.

Maharashtra State Road Transport Corporation (MSRTC), the state's biggest passenger transporter is diversifying 310 public transportation buses into goods transportation buses in Nagpur, because of depleting revenue due to the lockdown. The target is to convert 3,000 buses.

=== Tourism ===
Tourist spots in the state like Ajanta and Ellora Caves in Aurangabad district, Elephanta Island in Raigad district and Gateway of India in Mumbai reportedly witnessed a sharp decline in the number of visitors. Hotel, cab and private bus businesses in the state also reported a high number of booking cancellations in March.

Amidst a surge in confirmed cases across the state, the health officials declared that several tourist and religious sites will be closed down as a precautionary measure. These sites included Siddhivinayak Temple in Mumbai, Tulja Bhavani Temple in Osmanabad district, Ajanta and Ellora Caves in Aurangabad district, Dagadusheth Halwai Ganapati Temple in Pune, Mumba Devi Temple in Mumbai and Saibaba Temple in Shirdi. Entry restrictions were also enforced at Mantralaya, Mumbai. Mumbai Police placed a ban on all group tours in the city until 31 March.

=== Economic effects ===
The virus outbreak had a significant impact on the automobile sector in the state, according to a CNBC TV18 article on 21 March. Bajaj Auto closed down its manufacturing facilities in Akurdi and Chakan until 30 March, while Tata Motors scaled down operations in its Pune plant. Eicher Motors and Ashok Leyland shut down components plant in Thane and Bhandara respectively. Mercedes-Benz suspended operations at its Chakan facility until 31 March. Fiat, Force Motors and JCB also announced suspension of operations at units in Ranjangaon, Akurdi and Chakan respectively, until 31 March. Mahindra & Mahindra also declared that it would suspend manufacturing at its Nashik plant and production at its Chakan and Kandivali units, starting from 23 March.

According to a 17 March article in the Indian Express, the economy of Mumbai was projected to suffer losses worth at least ₹ 16,000 crore per month in the service sector, as a result of the outbreak. In addition, it predicted that the city's tourism industry would lose ₹ 2,200 crore per month from international tourists.

The entertainment industry in the state also suffered financially, with several Bollywood films postponing release dates or halting production, causing an "acute financial crunch" for many members of the Federation of Western India Cine Employees. Bollywood films were estimated to lose box office revenue of over ₹ 1,300 crore due to the lockdown.

On 30 March, the state government slashed electricity tariff by an average of 8 percent for a period of five years in order to minimize the economic impact of the outbreak on industries. Deputy Chief Minister and Finance Minister, Ajit Pawar, announced that the March salaries of all elected representatives (MLAs, MLCs and Chief Minister) would be cut by 60 percent, while some of the government employees will also see 25 to 50 percent salary cuts due to the economic crisis arising from outbreak and lockdown.

==== Efforts to improve the economy ====
According to the Maharashtra government, 60,000 industries have been re-opened in the state, which employ close to 1.5 million people. The government also states that there have been investment intentions (FDI) from countries such as Germany, Japan, Russia.

=== Migrant workers ===
After the enforcement of lockdown, scores of migrant labourers in Maharashtra who were left without work began to leave for their respective states. Thousands of workers reportedly started going to Gujarat and Rajasthan by foot as transport facilities were suspended, but were stranded at the state border. Thackeray appealed to the migrant workers to not travel back to their states, and announced a ₹ 45 crore package to provide food and accommodation for migrant labourers. On 30 March, the state government set up 262 relief camps across the state, providing food and shelter to 70,339 migrant workers and homeless people. On 8 April, it was reported that 4,653 camps were functioning across the state, which housed more than 550,000 people. These camps were started by district administrations, labour department, irrigation department and cooperative sugar mills. Several employers such as Larsen & Toubro, Godrej Group and Shapoorji Pallonji announced that they would provide food, accommodation and wages to their migrant labourers.

On 14 April, thousands of migrant workers protested against the lockdown near Bandra railway station in Mumbai, and demanded to be sent back to their states. Police made use of baton charges to disperse the unruly crowd and control the situation.

By 1 May, authorities reported that 11.86 lakh migrant workers had been taken back to their home state by at least 822 Shramik special trains.

=== Violation of norms ===
After many suspected patients fled from isolation wards of hospitals, the state government directed officials at hospitals and airports to stamp the left hand of people placed under 14-day home quarantine with details of their quarantine period using indelible ink, so as to easily identify them. It also announced that those who violate the quarantine will be isolated at a government facility.

== Testing ==
Until mid-March, the state had three testing facilities, which also tested samples from some other states for confirmation, viz. National Institute of Virology in Pune, Indira Gandhi Government Medical College & Hospital in Nagpur and Kasturba Hospital in Mumbai.

As of 19 June 2020, the state had 61 government labs and 43 private labs approved by the Indian Council of Medical Research set up across the state.

As of 10 April, Maharashtra has tested the most samples by any state in the country. Experts attribute the high number of positive cases in the state to "increased testing and surveillance" being done by the state authorities.

== See also ==
- COVID-19 pandemic in India
- COVID-19 pandemic in Delhi
