= Atal Beemit Vyakti Kalyan Yojana =

Government welfare scheme initiated

Atal Beemit Vyakti Kalyan Yojana (ABVKY)
- Country: India
- Prime Minister(s): Narendra Modi
- Launched: July 1, 2018
- Website: official website

The Atal Beemit Vyakti Kalyan Yojana (ABVKY) is a government welfare scheme initiated by the Central Government of India. Originally introduced as a pilot project for a duration of two years, the primary objective of the scheme is to provide financial support to individuals facing unemployment during the COVID-19 pandemic. The scheme's duration was later extended until June 30, 2022.

== Overview ==
The ABVKY was introduced in 2018 under the Employees' State Insurance Corporation (ESIC). The primary objective of the scheme was to offer support and employment opportunities to individuals who lost their jobs during the unprecedented COVID-19 pandemic, with a specific focus on workers in various industrial sectors.

== Benefits ==
The Atal Beemit Vyakti Kalyan Yojana provides financial assistance in the form of unemployment allowances to eligible beneficiaries. The amount of the allowance is a percentage of the average daily wages earned by the insured person during the relevant contribution period. The allowance is paid directly to the beneficiary's bank account for a maximum period of up to 90 days during the course of the unemployment spell.

== Eligibility criteria ==
To avail the benefits of the Atal Beemit Vyakti Kalyan Yojana, individuals must meet certain eligibility criteria. The scheme is available to those employees who are registered under the Employees' State Insurance (ESI) scheme.

- Employees in the Private Sector: Individuals employed in private sector companies that deduct Provident Fund (PF) or Employees' State Insurance (ESI) from their monthly salaries are eligible to participate in the scheme.
- ESI Card Holders: Employees working in private companies and factories, who have obtained an ESI card, can benefit from the ABVKY. This card serves as a crucial document for availing the scheme's benefits.
- Income Limit: The scheme is accessible to those employees whose monthly income is Rs. 21,000 or less.

== Application process ==
Individuals who qualify for the scheme can apply for benefits under the Atal Beemit Vyakti Kalyan Yojana by submitting relevant documents, such as the ESI card or the necessary paperwork from their employing company, to establish their eligibility for the scheme.

== See also ==
- Employees State Insurance Corporation (ESIC)
- Economic impact of the COVID-19 pandemic in India
- Indian government response to the COVID-19 pandemic
- Economic impact of the COVID-19 pandemic
