= Tawqir Raza Khan =

Indian Islamic scholar and politician

Mawlana Tawqir Raza Khan

Personal life
- Born: Bareilly, Uttar Pradesh, India
- Region: India
- Political party: Ittehad-e-Millat Council

Religious life
- Religion: Islam
- Denomination: Sunni
- Founder of: All India Muslim Personal Law Board (Jadeed)
- Jurisprudence: Hanafi
- Tariqa: Qadri
- Creed: Maturidi
- Movement: Traditional Sunni

Tauqir Raza Khan is an Indian Islamic scholar and politician who is the founder of the Ittehad-e-Millat Council, a political party based in Uttar Pradesh. A figure of the Barelvi Sunni Muslims, Tauqir is a great-grandson of Ahmad Raza Khan.

Khan also heads the All India Muslim Personal Law Board (Jadeed) after he cut ties with the All India Muslim Personal Law Board, claiming discrimination by the Deobandis. Khan was elevated to the post of the Vice-Chairman of his state's handloom department but resigned following the Muzaffarnagar riots. In 2016 he visited Deoband and met Deobandi scholars in an attempt to forge unity among Muslims. Khan is currently under arrest for organizing the "I Love Muhammad protests".

== Early life ==
Tauqir Raza Khan was born to son of Rehan Raza Khan, eldest son of Ibrahim Raza Khan and the great-grandson of Ahmed Raza Khan Barelvi, the founder of the Barelvi movement. His elder brother, Subhan Raza Khan, was the Sajjadanashin of Dargah-e-Aala Hazrat.

== Career ==
=== Political career ===
On 7 October 2001 Raza Khan formed his own political party, the Ittehad-e-Millat Council. In the first municipal election the party contested, it won 10 seats. The mayoral candidate of the party secured 36,000 votes.

In the 2009 Indian general election, Raza Khan supported the Indian National Congress party. With his support a Congress candidate – Praveen Singh Aron – was able defeat the Bharatiya Janata Party candidate and a six-time member of parliament Santosh Gangwar. In the 2012 Uttar Pradesh Assembly election, he pledged his support for the Samajwadi Party, and in the 2014 Indian general election, he supported the Bahujan Samaj Party.

In the 2012 election Raza Khan urged voters to vote in the name of religion for the minority community. The party made Shazil Islam Ansari, a former Bahujan Samaj Party minister, the candidate from Bhojipura constituency, which was home to 125,000 Muslims. Though he won from the constituency, he joined the Samajwadi Party.

In May 2013 Raza Khan was appointed as the vice-chairman of the Handloom Corporation on the condition that the Samajwadi Party would reconsider their candidates fielded in Moradabad and Bareilly for the 2014 Indian general election. He also demanded that a committee be created to investigate the causes of the communal riots that took place in the state during the tenure of chief minister Akhilesh Yadav. He also made clear that his party had not merged with the Samajwadi Party. However, in September 2014 he resigned from his post following the Muzaffarnagar riots. He accused the Samajwadi-led government of failing to protect Muslim citizens. He also alleged that his demand of an investigation into the communal riots had not been fulfilled. He also said:

The people of Uttar Pradesh had high hopes from the young chief minister Akhilesh Yadav – that he would herald a new era in the state, but he has disappointed people as he has no control over the officers of the police and the civil administration. This has created an anarchy-like situation in the state. If the Chief Minister had the ability and experience to run the administration, the situation in Muzaffarnagar would not have been so critical.

In November 2013, Raza Khan was visited by Delhi chief minister Arvind Kejriwal, who said that the man next to him was a "respectable person in the town". Kejriwal also refused to accept that by virtue of this meeting he was appeasing the Muslims. Raza Khan said that he liked Kejriwal for his India Against Corruption movement.

=== Religious career ===
The All India Muslim Personal Law Board is a non-governmental organisation for personal laws of the Muslims in India. Alleging discrimination, the Shia Muslims formed a parallel All India Shia Personal Law Board. In February 2005 Raza Khan formed his own All India Muslim Personal Law Board (Jadeed) ("Modern") for the Barelvi Muslims after alleging discrimination from the Deobandi members of the Law Board. He said:

AIMPLB has lost all credibility as its two main components have separated. We are the new board now. We were feeling suffocated earlier.

In May 2016 Raza Khan visited Deoband, the city from which a rival sect Deobandi originated, to meet the family of a boy who had been arrested on accusations of being involved in terrorism. He also visited the Darul Uloom Deoband seminary and spoke to Deobandi religious scholars. The Milli Gazette wrote that it was a move towards unity among Muslims. He said that though the Deobandis and Barelvis differed on theological issues, they should remain united while facing issues affecting the Islamic community. He also said that there was a need to fight the "common enemy". The Times of India wrote that the clerics from the rival sects had met, noting that it was a rare event for a cleric to visit the other's seminary.

The Times of India wrote that Raza Khan's visit to Deoband "stirred a sectarian storm" among the religious scholars of the Barelvi sect. His brother, Subhan Raza Khan, warned that he would face a boycott if he failed to apologise publicly. He said that he would do the same only if a fatwa (Islamic legal ruling) was issued by a mufti condemning his visit. A panel of 12 muftis was formed by the officials of the shrine of Ahmad Raza Khan who were given the responsibility to investigate the discussion that took place between Tawqir Raza Khan and the Deobandi scholars based on media files uploaded on social media.

=== 2025 I Love Muhammad protest ===
On 4 September 2025, during the Mawlid procession, Muslims blamed Hindus of tearing "I Love Muhammad" posters. After situation worsened, on 21 September 2025, the IMC under Khan announced to assemble a peaceful protest on 26 September after the Friday prayer. During the start of the I Love Muhammad protests, Khan was arrested and detained by the Uttar Pradesh police along with many others.

== Views ==
=== Sufi conference ===
In March 2016 an International Sufi Conference was held in Delhi which was inaugurated by Prime Minister Narendra Modi. Raza Khan criticised the event, claiming that Rashtriya Swayamsevak Sangh (a Hindu right-wing organisation) was creating sectarian conflict among the Muslims with this conference. He also said:

The history is witness of the fact that a Sufi never went to the doors of rich, its first time that in name of Sufism privileges are being availed from Prime Minister and the RSS.

== Controversies ==
=== Taslima Nasrin issue ===
Raza Khan became controversial when he spoke about Taslima Nasrin, a Bangladeshi anti-Islamic author. In 2007 Raza Khan had announced a reward of Rs5 lakh on the author's head if the Indian government did not restrict her entry to India. According to a report, Khan had said, "the only way a fatwa against Taslima Nasreen, whose writings clerics denounced as anti-Islam, could be withdrawn was if she burnt her books and left India."

=== 2010 arrest ===
In 2010 Raza Khan was arrested in connection to a riot between Hindus and Muslims that broke out in the city of Bareilly. While the Muslims demanded his release, the Hindus protested against it. In a joint statement, the Muslim Students Organisation and the Barkati Educational Trust said that he was arrested on the basis of a fake complaint and claimed that, if he was not released, the city might not return to normalcy. Even though he was released, Outlook India wrote that it had led to polarisation among Hindus and Muslims on religious lines.

In March 2024, A session court declared that Tawqir Raza Khan was the mastermind of the 2010 riots. The Court mentioned that the inflammatory speech of Tawqir Raza incited a Muslim mob that vandalised properties and religious places of other communities. The court also accused then state administration of trying to shield Tawqir Raza Khan.

=== Against banning Triple Talaq ===
In a program for religious unity held in Bareilly, Raza Khan claimed that Hindu women had five husbands and that they did not know who the father of their children was. He also warned that Muslims would interfere in the matters of Hindus if the Hindus interfered in the matters of Muslims. He made these comments in response to the debate of implementing a uniform civil code in the country and banning the Islamic instant divorce.

=== 2024 Jail Bharo Aandolan ===
On 9 February 2024, Khan was detained by the Uttar Pradesh police after Khan announced for the Jail Bharo Aandolan (Fill the prison movement). It was started after Mufti Salman Azhari was arrested and in response to the Court verdict regarding Gyanvapi Mosque and against the Statements of Yogi Adityanath against Shahi Idgah Mosque. He had called for the protest on 8 February 2024.
