= All India Muslim Personal Law Board (Jadeed) =

Indian Barelvi organisation

AIMPLB (Jadeed)
- All India Muslim Personal Law Board (Jadeed)
- Abbreviation: AIMPLB (J)
- Predecessor: All India Muslim Personal Law Board
- Formation: 10 December 2004; 21 years ago
- Founder: Tawqir Raza Khan
- Founded at: Lucknow, Uttar Pradesh
- Type: Religious
- Headquarters: Lucknow, Uttar Pradesh
- Region served: India
- Fields: Islam
- Official language: English, Hindi, Urdu, Arabic, Persian
- President: Tawqir Raza Khan

All India Muslim Personal Law Board (Jadeed) (abbreviated as AIMPLB(J)) is a non-governmental organisation in India which represents the interests of Barelvi Sunni Muslims of India in the Muslim personal law called Sharia. It split from the All India Muslim Personal Law Board and was founded as a separate organisation in December 2004.

== History and establishment ==
In November 2004, Islamic scholar Tawqir Raza Khan felt that the All India Muslim Personal Law Board was not sufficiently representing the Barelwis and headed to establish a new and separate board to overcome this issue on 10 December 2004. It was the second split from the AIMPLB, the first one being the All India Muslim Women Personal Law Board. German scholar Mathias Rohe states that "the board represents the Barelwi school but is not visible to the public, and, is vehemently rejected by traditionalists."

It was formed after Tauqeer was made a member of AIMPLB without asking his permission, as per the statement. Tauqeer accused AIMPLB members, they are the people who don't follow Shariah themselves and are a servant of the government only.

== Activism ==
According to a 2021 report by the Siasat Daily, the AIMPLB (J) offered half a million Indian rupees for having Taslima Nasrin beheaded if she did not apologize. The organisation has actively participated in Triple Talaq issue, Dharmsansad issue and Bhagwa Love Trap conspiracy theory cases.
