= Shazil Islam Ansari =

Indian politician

Member of the Uttar Pradesh Legislative Assembly
- Incumbent
- Assumed office 10 March 2022
- Preceded by: Bahoran Lal Maurya
- Constituency: Bhojipura
- In office May 2007 – March 2017
- Preceded by: Virendra Singh
- Succeeded by: Bahoran Lal Maurya
- Constituency: Bhojipura
- In office Feb 2002 – May 2007
- Preceded by: Ashfaq Ahmad
- Succeeded by: None
- Constituency: Bareilly Cantonment

Personal details
- Born: 14 June 1976 (age 50) Uttar Pradesh
- Party: Samajwadi Party
- Other political affiliations: Ittehad-e-Millat Council
- Spouse: Ayesha Islam
- Education: Mahatma Jyotiba Phule Rohilkhand University
- Profession: Businessperson, politician

Shazil Islam Ansari is an Indian politician and was a member of the Sixteenth Legislative Assembly of Uttar Pradesh in India. He represents the Bhojipura constituency of Uttar Pradesh and is a member of the Ittehad-e-Millat Council political party.

== Early life and education ==
Shazil Islam Ansari was born in Uttar Pradesh to Islam Sabir Ansari. He did his schooling at G D Birla Memorial School, (Class of 1995) a boarding hostel in Ranikhet, Uttarakhand.

He holds a Bachelor's degree from M. J. P. Rohilkhand University.

== Political career ==
Shazil Islam Ansari has been a MLA for three terms. He represented the Bhojipura constituency and is a member of the Ittehad-e-Millat Council political party.

He lost his seat in the 2017 Uttar Pradesh Assembly election to Bahoran Lal Maurya of the Bharatiya Janata Party. He won U.P. 2022 election from Bhojipura.

== Posts held ==
#	From	To	Position	Comments
01	2002	2007	Member, 14th Legislative Assembly	
02	2007	2012	Member, 15th Legislative Assembly	
03	2012	2017	Member, 16th Legislative Assembly	
04	2022	2027	Member, 18th Legislative Assembly	

== See also ==
- Bhojipura (Assembly constituency)
- Sixteenth Legislative Assembly of Uttar Pradesh
- Uttar Pradesh Legislative Assembly
