= Bahoran Lal Maurya =

Indian politician

Member of Uttar Pradesh legislative council
- Incumbent
- Assumed office 2024
- Preceded by: Swami Prasad Maurya
- Constituency: elected by Legislative assembly members

Minister of State Government of Uttar Pradesh
- In office 1997–2002
- Governor: Romesh Bhandari; Suraj Bhan; Vishnu Kant Shastri
- Chief Minister: Kalyan Singh; Ram Prakash Gupta; Rajnath Singh
- Ministry & Departments: Finance; Revenue
- Preceded by: Vishambhar Prasad Nishad
- Succeeded by: Ravi Gautam

Member of Uttar Pradesh legislative assembly
- In office 2017–2022
- Preceded by: Shazil Islam Ansari
- Succeeded by: Shazil Islam Ansari
- Constituency: Bhojipura, Bareilly District
- In office 1996–2002
- Preceded by: Harish Kumar Gangwar
- Succeeded by: Virendra Singh
- Constituency: Bhojipura, Bareilly District

Personal details
- Party: Bharatiya Janata Party
- Parent: Shri Malkhan Maurya
- Occupation: Politician
- Profession: Politician

Bahoran Lal Maurya is an Indian politician currently serving as MLC and he also served as an MLA in 13th & 17th Uttar Pradesh Legislative Assembly of Bareilly of Uttar Pradesh State of India. He had represented the Bhojipura constituency of Uttar Pradesh and is a member of the Bharatiya Janata Party.

== Political career ==
Maurya has been a member of the 13th & 17th Legislative Assembly of Uttar Pradesh.In 1996 & 2017, he has represented the Bhojipura constituency and in 2024 he has been elected unopposed MLC in a by-election as a candidate of the BJP.

Maurya is an original resident of Firozpur village of Dataganj in Badayun district. In 1997, he was made the revenue minister in Government of Uttar Pradesh. He was a candidate of BJP in 2022 Uttar Pradesh Legislative Assembly election as well. In 2024, after resignation of Swami Prasad Maurya from Samajwadi Party and his membership of Uttar Pradesh Legislative Council, he was made the candidate of BJP for legislative council elections. He was elected unopposed as member of legislative council in this election.

According to media reports, in the year 2022, large number of local representatives like Mukhiyas and village chiefs wrote to BJP leadership that they will ditch BJP if Maurya is given the ticket from the Bhojipura constituency. Yet, BJP fielded him and the party suffered a defeat. However, following the performance of Akhilesh Yadav led Samajwadi Party in 2024 Lok Sabha polls, which was a result of his reliance on the formula of PDA i.e Pichhda (Other Backward Castes), Dalit (Schedule Castes) and Alpsankhyak (Minorities), there emerged a necessity in BJP to raise Other Backward Caste leaders like Maurya to important positions. This resulted in securing of his candidature to Uttar Pradesh Legislative Council.

== Posts held ==
#	From	To	Position	Party
01	1996	2002	Member, 13th Legislative Assembly	BJP
02	1997	2002	Minister of State for Revenue & Finance; Government of Uttar Pradesh	BJP
03	2017	2022	Member, 17th Legislative Assembly	BJP
04	2024		Member, Uttar Pradesh legislative council	BJP

== See also ==
- Uttar Pradesh Legislative Assembly
