= Kasturba Hospital (Mumbai) =

- Municipal Corporation of Greater Mumbai
- Shown in Mumbai

Geography
- Location: Chinchpokli, Mumbai, Maharashtra, India
- Coordinates: 18°59′03″N 72°49′47″E

Organisation
- Type: Infectious diseases

Services
- Emergency department: Yes

Links
- Website: Website information
- Lists: Hospitals in India

Kasturba Hospital is a government hospital situated at Chinchpokli in Mumbai. It is funded by the Municipal corporation of Greater Mumbai and is one of the centres for coronavirus testing in Mumbai.
