= Maulana Azad Minorities Financial Development Corporation Limited =

Maulana Azad Minorities Financial Development Corporation Limited is the state agency of Government of Maharashtra set up in 2000 to meet the financial requirements of and to provide loans to the minority communities.
