= COVID-19 pandemic in Karnataka =

- Disease: COVID-19
- Pathogen: SARS-CoV-2
- Location: Karnataka, India
- Index case: Bengaluru Urban
- Arrival date: 8 March 2020 (6 years, 6 months and 3 days)
- Confirmed cases: ▲2587827
- Active cases: ▼696
- Recovered: ▲2217117
- Deaths: 28679
- Fatality rate: 0%

Government website
- karunadu.karnataka.gov.in/hfw

The first case of the COVID-19 pandemic in the Indian state of Karnataka was confirmed on 8 March 2020. Two days later, the state became the first in India to invoke the provisions of the Epidemic Diseases Act, 1897, which was set to last for a year, to curb the spread of the disease. As of 25 October 2022, Karnataka had 4,001,655 confirmed cases and 40,097 deaths. with 3,952,381 recoveries and 9,135 active cases.

== Timeline of events ==
=== February 2020 ===
- On 24 February, an IT professional who worked at a tech park in the outskirts of Bengaluru and stayed in a PG accommodation travelled to Dubai on an assignment on 15 February and returned to Bengaluru on 20 February. He attended office for two days – 20 and 21 February. After taking the bus to Hyderabad, Telangana, his samples had tested positive on 24 February.

=== March 2020 ===
- On 8 March, an employee of Dell who traveled from Texas on 28 February via New York City and Dubai, before arriving at Bengaluru on 1 March, tested positive for coronavirus. His wife and daughter along with one of his colleagues were admitted to a hospital. The colleague showed flu-like symptoms.
- On 10 March, an employee of Mindtree came back to Bengaluru from an overseas trip. He tested positive.
- On 12 March, a 26-year-old man, an employee of Google who came from a trip to Greece, was confirmed to be positive for coronavirus, according to the state health department. In addition, his wife did not disclose their travel history and had evaded protocols while traveling back to her hometown of Agra in Uttar Pradesh. The country's first death due to coronavirus was reported from Karnataka after the state confirmed that samples of a deceased 76-year-old man from Kalaburagi were positive. The man had returned from Saudi Arabia on 29 February.
- On 15 March, the daughter of the 76-year-old man from Kalaburagi who died last week was found to have coronavirus.
- On 16 March, a 32-year-old man, who returned from the US via London earlier this month, tested positive. He had returned from the US via London on 8 March by the same flight as the patient #4 (Mindtree employee) who had tested positive.
- On 17 March, three more cases were reported – The first was a 20-year-old woman who had travelled to the United Kingdom. The second one, the 63-year-old doctor who treated the senior citizen who died recently of COVID-19 in Kalaburagi. In another case reported, a 67-year-old female resident of Bengaluru returned from Dubai via Goa on 9 March. She is a known case of chronic kidney disease.
- On 18 March, three more positive cases were reported in Bengaluru. The first, a 56-year-old man who returned from the US on 6 March. The second, a 26-year-old woman who returned from Spain. The third, a 35-year-old man who returned from US on 10 March.
- On 19 March, one more positive case confirmed in Kodagu with travel history to Saudi Arabia. The person arrived at Bengaluru from Dubai on 15 March.
- On 21 March, five positive cases were reported in the state. The first is a 53-year-old woman from Bengaluru. She was a housemaid for case-11, a 67-year-old female who was confirmed as positive on 17 March. The second and the third are from Bengaluru of age 39 and 21 years respectively. The former returned from Amsterdam, Netherlands on 19 March and the latter from Scotland on 17 March. The fourth, a 32-year-old man with travel history to Mecca from Gauribidanur in Chikkaballapura. The fifth is a 35-year-old male from Mysore who arrived at Bengaluru on 19 March from Dubai.
- On 23 March, seven positive cases were reported in the state. Two of them (P27, P33) are from Kerala with travel history to Dubai and currently being treated at Mysuru & Bengaluru respectively. All remaining five cases are from Bengaluru, four with travel history (P28, P29, P31, P32)- from Dubai, UK, UK and Germany and one being a local transmission – P30 who is the wife of P17.
- On 24 March, eight new cases were reported including 3 transit passengers of Kerala who had landed in airports and were being treated in Karnataka.
- On 26 March, four more positive cases were confirmed in the state. P52 from Mysuru has neither travel history nor contact of him with any other positive cases.
- On 27 March, nine new cases were reported. A 65-year-old man with travel history to Delhi, died in Tumakuru. P56 (10-month-old male child) from Dakshina Kannada had no history of travel to COVID-19-affected countries but was taken by parents to nearby Kerala and investigation is underway for tracing.
- On 29 March, seven new cases were reported, of which five were from the same pharmaceutical company in Nanjanagudu. This is termed as a cluster, and the town has been put under complete lockdown.
- On 30 March, five new cases were reported, of which four were from the same pharmaceutical company in Nanjanagudu. P84 from Tumakuru is the son of P60.
- On 31 March, thirteen new cases were reported, of which two were from the same pharmaceutical company in Nanjanagudu, three were from Ballari and had only been to Bengaluru, and one person in Bengaluru with no travel details is in ICU.

=== April 2020 ===
- On 2 April, fourteen new cases have come out, including 2 from Nanjanagudu and 11 from Tablighi Jamaat meet in Bidar.
- On 3 April, four new cases including 3 from Belagavi who attended Tablighi Jamaat meet, Delhi and a 70-year-old man from Bagalkot.
- On 4 April, the 75-year-old man from Bagalkot died. 16 new cases were confirmed.
- On 10 April, several new SARI (Severe Acute Respiratory Infection) cases were emerging (8 to date), which became a mystery for the health department.
- On 12 April, 567 new cases were reported. A new case emerged after 21 days of travel. An unknown cluster seemed to have emerged in Vijayapura.
- On 23 April, a cluster emerged in Bangalore with 9 contacts of a migrant labourer from Bihar testing positive.
- On 30 April, 30 new cases were reported.

=== May 2020 ===
- On 4 May, 37 new cases were reported, of which 20 were contacts of P533 in Davanagere, and 7 were contacts of P590 in Bidar.

== Early containment efforts ==
On 9 March 2020, the Karnataka state government issued a circular ordering the closure of kindergartens and primary classes in all schools in the state. The minister for primary and secondary Education, S. Suresh Kumar, said that this circular was issued as a precautionary measure to prevent the spread of coronavirus. On 31 March, the Government vide its circular, postponed the examinations for class 7 to 9 as a precautionary measure to avoid spread of coronavirus.

The Chief Minister of Karnataka, B.S. Yediyurappa after the State reporting its first death, issued a directive to close all public places with high footfall such as malls, universities and colleges, movie theatres, night clubs, marriages and conferences, as a precautionary measure amid the growing scare of the novel coronavirus (COVID-19). Further, the State closed its borders with Kerala for vehicular traffic in the wake of six people testing positive for coronavirus in bordering Kasargod of Kerala.

On Sunday 22 March, after the second meeting of the Task force formed to tackle the COVID-19 pandemic, the Government announced further restriction in the form of lockdown of 9 Districts until 31 March. All non-essential services in these districts were suspended. The nine districts where COVID-19 cases were reported were: Bengaluru Rural, Bengaluru Urban, Chikkaballapura, Dakshina Kannada, Dharwad, Kalaburagi, Mysuru, Kodagu and Belagavi.

== Lockdown ==
Further, to contain community transmission of the virus, the central government decided to enforce a lockdown of the entire country for a period of 21 days beginning 25 March 2020.

=== Initial lockdown ===
To address the plight of migrant workers and the poor, the Government of Karnataka established a toll-free helpline number – 155214 – for providing food to migrant laborers in the state.

On 11 April, the government issued a circular advising all citizens and health care officials to download, promote and use Aarogya Setu application on their mobile phones to enhance contact tracing of infected persons. The mobile application is designed to give alerts if an infected person comes within the proximity of the person who has installed the application on their phones using Bluetooth and GPS technology.

In line with Governments of India's order, Minority Welfare, Waqf and Hajj Department under Government of Karnataka issued an order on 15 April for suspending all the congressional prayers (Salat) during the month of Ramadan in mosques/Dargahs until 3 May 2020, due to current CoVid-19 pandemic in the state. The order also banned all the eateries near mosques.

=== Lockdown 2.0 ===
With states in favor of continuing the term of lockdown for another two weeks, during his fourth address to the nation concerning Coronavirus, Prime Minister Narendra Modi extended the lockdown until 3 May starting 14 April. However, based on the Centers' guidelines issued, the Chief Minister of Karnataka indicated the decision on relaxation would be taken on 20 April after evaluating the extent of public conformity to the lockdown.

Following up with the message of the extension of the lockdown. The Central Government announced a fresh set of guidelines to be observed by all States.

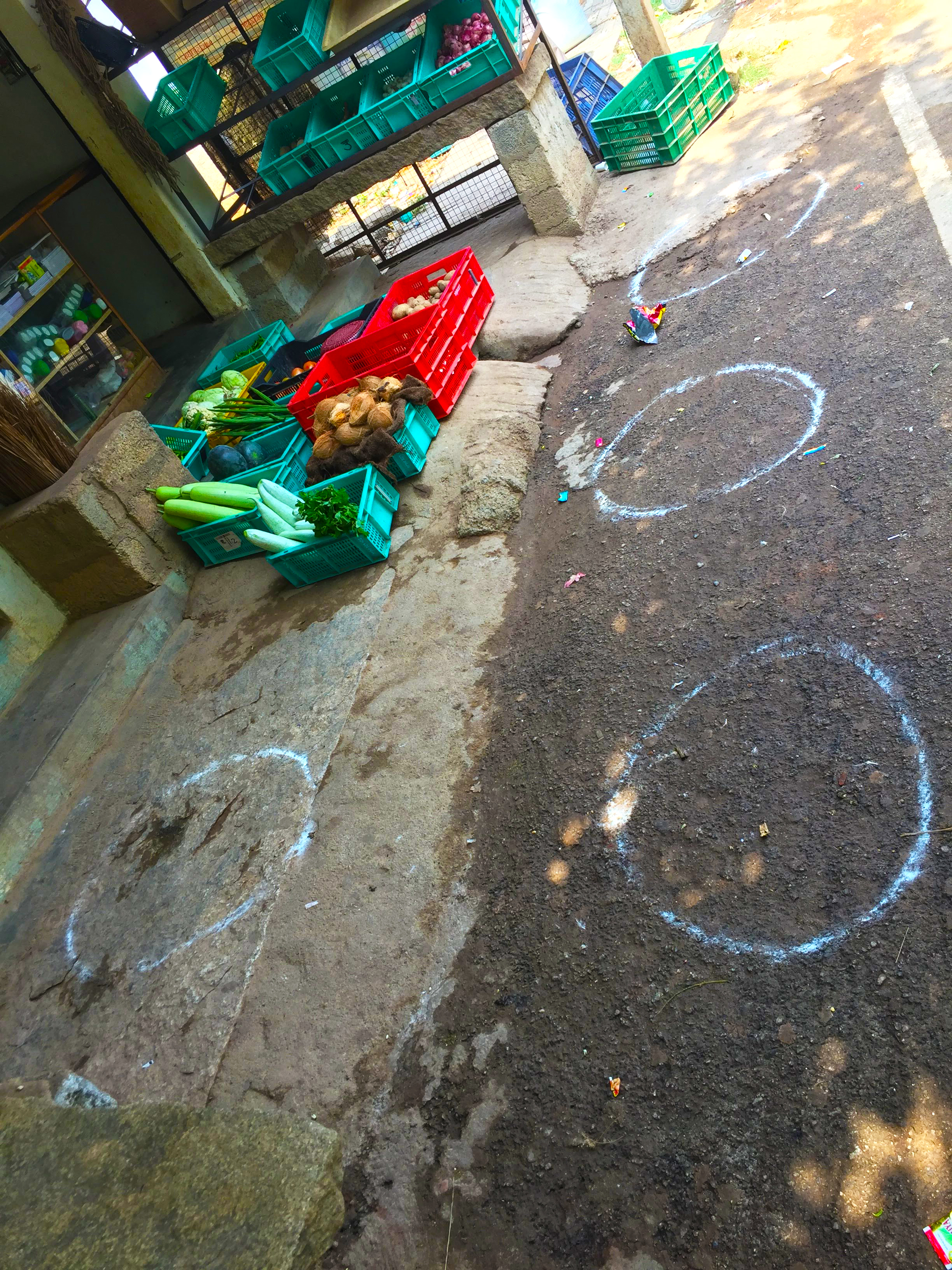
Circles drawn in front of a Bengaluru store to guide for social distancing

- All places of social gatherings including religious conventions shall be barred.
- Most of the Agricultural activities shall be exempted and will be allowed to be operated.
- All Public work programs linked with employment of daily -wage-labours with social-distancing measures in place.

=== Lockdown 3.0 ===
In line with guidelines issued by the Government of India, the Chief Minister of Karnataka, further extended the lockdown in the state up to 17 May. This time, the Government classified the areas in four main categories: Containment, Red, Orange, and Green zones, based on conducting risk profiling of various districts.

=== Lockdown 4.0 ===
On 18 May 2020, the Chief Minister of Karnataka announced the continuation of the lockdown in the state up to 31 May 2020. Alongside this, he also gave many relaxations after receiving the guidelines from the central Ministry of Home Affairs. During this phase of the lockdown, most of the activities excluding Shopping Malls, Cinema halls, Hotels, Restaurants were permitted to operate between 7 Am to 7 PM, except on Sundays, as the government decided to enforce a strict lockdown on every Sunday up to 31 May 2020. After a closure of almost two months, all modes of public transport services, including buses, cabs, auto-rickshaws, and intrastate train services were permitted to operate from 19 May 2020. Putting an end to the speculation on raising the fares in state-run buses, due to the limited number of seats in a bus, the Chief Minister said: "We will not increase bus fares for now. KSRTC will bear the losses caused due to carrying a limited number of passengers." In the wake of the spike in the COVID-19 cases reported in the 2020 summer, the government decided to allow people from neighbouring states of Gujarat, Maharashtra, Tamil Nadu, and Kerala in a restricted manner.

== Lockdown exit strategy ==
The Government of Karnataka, facing severe financial crunch, in an attempt to kick-start the economy, on 23 April announced a conditional relaxing of restrictions in lockdown by exempting some economic activity in the state. However, the relaxations would not apply in the designated containment zones. Most of the Manufacturing, Construction and Food processing units outside municipal limits were exempted. Hotels, home stays where people were stranded because of lockdown were allowed to open including various services linked with the supply chain at railway stations, seaports and airports could function. Most of the services provided by self-employed persons like plumbers, technicians and carpenters were also allowed. However, the officials stressed that various District Administrations shall clear all the exemptions after examining the compliance by the people of the lockdown guidelines in respective regions and relaxations will be subject to strict adherence of the social distancing norms and sanitization of the workplaces.

=== Unlock-1 ===
After a nine-week long lockdown, the government of Karnataka, in line with the directions issued by the central government on the guidelines on the fifth phase of the lockdown and termed it "Unlock-I", which was intended towards easing many restrictions imposed on inter-state and inter-state movement of people and goods. During the first phase of unlocking, which was to come into effect from 8 June, more relaxations were provided and a decision towards the opening of the religious places, hotels, malls, etc. was taken. The decision on reopening of educational institutions was deferred to July, the government sources, on the issue said: "The state government will hold consultations at the institution level with parents and other stakeholders." However, the rigorous restrictions shall remain in effect in the containment zones.

== Initial Success & 5T Policy ==
The policy of trace, track, test, treat and technology (5T) was pioneered by Karnataka to fight the pandemic. During an interaction through the video conferencing, the Prime Minister of India, Narendra Modi, appreciated the state's efforts in combating the COVID-19 spread and steps taken to unlock the economy with the gradual relaxation of the extended lockdown norms. The center has asked the other states to adopt these best practices to their local context and replicate them for better management of the COVID-19 pandemic.

=== Tracing ===
More than 10,000 field staff carry out specific responsibilities for contact tracing as per the detailed plan designed by the state which prescribed step-by-step actions to be performed by each designated person. The Contact Tracing mobile app and web application were being used to overcome the huge quantum of work of the positive persons and attempts to hide facts due to various reasons.

To identify, protect and treat high-risk population like the elderly, persons with co-morbidities, pregnant women and those with influenza-like illness, Severe Acute Respiratory Illness (SARI) on priority, the state conducted a physical and phone-based household survey. The survey was carried out during May 2020 and covered 15.3 million households out of a total of 16.8 million total households in Karnataka. Polling Booth Level Officers (BLO) were engaged to collect necessary information by using a Health Survey App as well as a Web Application.

The data collected through the survey was complemented by the information already available with the Health Department for pregnant mothers and Tuberculosis, HIV, dialysis and cancer patients. An outreach campaign through Apthamitra teleconsultation helpline (Call No. 14410) set up by the state government, with support from NASSCOM, is being used to reach out to the households at risk through Interactive Voice Response System (IVRS) and outbound calls.

=== Tracking ===
All persons returning or travelling to Karnataka are required to register on the "Seva Sindhu" portal, which enables the state to follow them for the next few days when they are at home or in institutional quarantine. The 'Quarantine Watch App' is used to assist the field workers in enforcing the quarantine. The state government has also formed Mobile Squads for the enforcement of home quarantine through community participation. In case information about violation of quarantine is received from a neighbour or some member of the public, that violator is moved to institutional quarantine.

=== Treatment ===
According to data from the Karnataka state COVID-19 war room, the state has 84,776 beds in its districts, of which 21,728 have been reserved for COVID-19. A total of 19,639 beds were available in Bengaluru Urban and Rural districts. And of these, 3,470 were reserved for COVID-19 in the two districts. More than 86% of the 21,728 beds were isolation beds – 6,695 with oxygen facilities, 2,105 ICU beds, and 1,000 with ventilators. With the number of COVID-19 cases in Karnataka going up, the hospital bed occupancy in Karnataka which was at less than 2% until 8 May, had shot up to 13.1% by 9 June.

The Karnataka Government issued an order to fix the rates for COVID-19 treatment in private hospitals. The rates range from ₹5,200 to ₹25,000 depending on the category and severity of infection and can be availed by both Ayushman Bharat-Arogya Karnataka (AB-ArK) patients and other insurance/cash paying patients. The State Government also directed 50% of beds in private hospitals having facilities to treat COVID-19 patients should be reserved for patients referred from public health authorities.

=== Technology ===
Karnataka was among the many states which decided to turn to technology to help government officials manage the number of tasks cropping up due to the COVID-19 pandemic. Through a team of in-house programmers, the state rolled out a series of mobile applications in first three months on the pandemic in the country including a contact tracing application. Apart from the application for contact tracing, the state also introduced the 'Quarantine Watch', to keep a watch over and enforce quarantine of travellers who returned to Karnataka, 'Yatri Web App' to track international arrivals and the 'Critical Patient Tracking System' to track all critical patients in the state. Other applications were created like the 'Daily Rail and Air Passenger Arrival Tracking' to track arrivals of people coming into the state and the 'Health Watch App' which recorded data of the door-to-door survey done by health workers and identified vulnerable households. The data collected was transferred to other applications like the Aapthamithra and was used by the health department to follow up.

=== Testing ===
By June 2020, the state was conducting an average of 10,000 tests per day. The state contains 74 laboratories for testing compared to the total of 600 labs in the whole country. Due to the rising COVID cases, the Karnataka government said that it was planning to initially increase testing capacity to 15,000 and then to 25,000 samples a day. The Karnataka Government directed the conduction of random testing using RT-PCR pooled sample technique, for slum dwellers, vendors/bill collectors, delivery boys of food chains and couriers, to ensure effective surveillance in view of recent increase in COVID-19 cases in the state.

Indian scientists at Institute of Genomics and Integrative Biology, using the CRISPR gene editing tool developed a low-cost paper-strip test for COVID-19, which could give results in an hour. The estimated cost of the paper-strip test could be around ₹500 (US$5.20). Currently, the kits are being tested for its accuracy and sensitivity. The team is awaiting approval from Indian Council of Medical Research.

== Surge after Unlock ==
Following Unlock-1, there was significant surge in the cases throughout the state, specially in the capital Bengaluru. The number of cases increased from 11,005 just on 26 June to 23,474 by 5 July.

=== Local lockdowns ===
Due to the increasing number of cases in several parts of the state, many districts reintroduced lockdown measures. Chief Minister BS Yediyurappa announced that the Bengaluru will be under lockdown from 14 July for a period of 7 days to control the spread of the disease. Following Bengaluru, a total lockdown was reimposed in three more Karnataka districts– Dakshina Kannada, Dharwad and Kalaburagi– for a period of 7–10 days.

== Impact ==
=== Economy ===
The lockdown due to Coronavirus hit over 1 crore jobs, with the government's orders to close down places of commerce, industry and social assembly to prevent coronavirus cases from rising made the city of Bengaluru look like "ghost town". At the same time, the city's purchasing and economic power has also reduced. B. T. Manohar, a tax expert for Federation of Karnataka Chambers of Commerce and Industry said that the loss of Goods & Services tax, and sales tax revenue alone for the state exchequer would amount to around Rs 2,000 crore, if the lockdown lasted for even a single week.

=== Education ===
Due to the nation-wide lockdown, the Karnataka government postponed the SSLC (10th grade) exams indefinitely. The government has also cancelled the annual exams for students up to and including 9th standard. The State Education Department also issued an order to all schools in the state to postpone their admission processes until further notice.

=== Entertainment ===
Owing to the pandemic and the subsequent lockdown, all the theatres in the state were ordered to close. Film production activities, which provide a livelihood to thousands in the state, were also suspended. Soorappa Babu, a producer of several well-known Kannada films like Kotigobba, opined that pandemic and the lockdown will lead to a loss of nearly ₹200 crores for the Kannada film industry. Makers of several small budget Kannada films were considering skipping theatrical releases and opting for OTT platforms like Amazon Prime in the future.

Following the pandemic, the shooting of TV shows came to a standstill in Karnataka, forcing makers to re-air old episodes or end their serials abruptly. The pandemic also impacted theater artists severely. Many theatre groups are dependent on performing at annual fairs and chariot festivals of deities across the State, which occur mostly from January to April. All such gatherings and religious events were not permitted due to the lockdown.

== Statistics ==
=== Total confirmed cases, active cases, recoveries and deaths ===
Total confirmed cases Active Cases Recoveries Deaths

=== Daily new cases ===
New cases per day

=== Daily new deaths ===
New deaths per day

=== Daily new tests ===
New tests per day

== Misinformation ==
The Department of Animal Husbandry and Fisheries of Karnataka has issued a public notification against rumors that the coronavirus spreads from poultry. It has advised people not to heed to such social media messages as there is no scientific evidence of corona viral infection in poultry. It is made clear that this virus spread from contact with infected persons only. Similarly, an employee of an IT firm was booked by the Bengaluru Central Crime Branch in a case for sharing objectionable content on social media.

Some residents of Padarayanapura, a suburb of Bangalore, resorted to rioting and destroying BBMP assets at the location and attacked BBMP and health officials, when they arrived at the site to take some of the primary and secondary contacts of infected persons to the Government-run quarantine facility. The police have registered an FIR against 67 residents of the area for rioting. Jameer Ahmad, a local political leader commented, "The incident that led to rioting and arson was due to misinformation and lack of awareness among the residents, and officials should have taken my permission to visit the site." Some residents even argued that the officials should take people to quarantine facility in the presence of elected representatives.

== See also ==
- COVID-19 pandemic in India
