= Bhojipura Assembly constituency =

Constituency of the Uttar Pradesh legislative assembly in India

Bhojipura
- Constituency No. 120 for the Uttar Pradesh Legislative Assembly

Constituency details
- Country: India
- Region: North India
- State: Uttar Pradesh
- District: Bareilly
- Total electors: 289,427 (2012)
- Reservation: None

Member of Legislative Assembly
- 18th Uttar Pradesh Legislative Assembly
- Incumbent Shazil Islam Ansari
- Party: Samajwadi Party
- Elected year: 2022

Bhojipura Assembly constituency is one of the 403 constituencies of the Uttar Pradesh Legislative Assembly, India. It is a part of the Bareilly district and one of the five assembly constituencies in the Bareilly Lok Sabha constituency. First election in this assembly constituency was held in 1957 after the "DPACO (1956)" (delimitation order) was passed in 1956. After the "Delimitation of Parliamentary and Assembly Constituencies Order" was passed in 2008, the constituency was assigned identification number 120.

== Wards / Areas ==
Extent of Bhojipura Assembly constituency is KC Shergarh, Devraniya NP & Shergarh NP of Baheri Tehsil; KCs Bhojipura, Rithora, CB Ganj, Rithora NP, Dhaura Tanda NP & Pipalsana Chaudhdhari (CT) of Bareilly Tehsil.

Popular Village- Jadounpur is a village which was found to be very old. It is very popular for its growing marketing and business. it is observed that there were some inter-caste groups of Kurmi clans known as Jadon (Kurmi), who are similar to Gangwar and intermarry. These were the initial settlers in this village. |Popular businesses|- textile;sarees, enterprises:almirah,electricals. Nargis cloth house is the oldest and most famous cloth store whereas Shahji electricals are popular for electricals and almirahs.

== Members of the Legislative Assembly ==
Year	Member	Party
1957	Babu Ram	Indian National Congress
1962	Harish Kumar Gangawar	Bharatiya Jana Sangh
1967	Harish Kumar Gangawar	Bharatiya Jana Sangh
1969	Bhanu Pratap Singh	Indian National Congress
1974	Harish Kumar Gangawar	Bharatiya Jana Sangh
1977	Hamid Raza Khan	Independent
1980	Bhanu Pratap Singh	Indian National Congress (I)
1985	Narendra Pal Singh	Indian National Congress
1989	Narendra Pal Singh	Janata Dal
1991	Kunwar Subhash Patel	Bharatiya Janata Party
1993	Harish Kumar Gangawar	Samajwadi Party
1996	Bahoran Lal Maurya	Bharatiya Janata Party
2002	Virendra Singh	Samajwadi Party
2007	Shazil Islam Ansari	Bahujan Samaj Party
2012	Shazil Islam Ansari	Ittehad-e-Millat Council
2017	Bahoran Lal Maurya	Bharatiya Janata Party
2022	Shazil Islam Ansari	Samajwadi Party

== Election results ==
=== 2027 ===
2027 Uttar Pradesh Legislative Assembly election: Bhojipur
Party	Candidate	Votes	%	±%
INDIA				
NDA				
BSP				
NOTA	None of the above			
Majority				
Turnout				
gain from		Swing		

=== 2022 ===
2022 Uttar Pradesh Legislative Assembly election: Bhojipura
Party	Candidate	Votes	%	±%
SP	Shazil Islam Ansari	119,402	45.88	▲15.45
BJP	Bahoran Lal Maurya	109,993	42.26	▲0.19
BSP	Yogesh Patel	26,909	10.34	▼10.56
NOTA	None of the above	1,373	0.53	▼0.21
Majority		9,409	3.62	▼8.02
Turnout		260,250	68.83	▲0.08
SP gain from BJP		Swing		

=== 2017 ===
2017 Uttar Pradesh Legislative Assembly Election: Bhojipura
Party	Candidate	Votes	%	±%
BJP	Bahoran Lal Maurya	100,381	42.07	
SP	Shazil Islam Ansari	72,617	30.43	
BSP	Sulman Baig	49,882	20.9	
Ittehad-E-Millait Council	Sher Ali Jafri	6,494	2.72	
NOTA	None of the above	1,763	0.74	
Majority		27,764	11.64	
Turnout		238,631	68.75	

=== 2012 ===
16th Vidhan Sabha: 2012 General Elections

2012 General Elections: Bhojipura
Party	Candidate	Votes	%	±%
IEMC	Shazil Islam Ansari	65,531	32.55	–
SP	Virendra Singh	47,583	23.63	–
BJP	Bahoran Lal Maurya	34,281	17.03	–
	Remainder 16 candidates	53,932	26.78	–
Majority		17,948	8.91	–
Turnout		201,327	69.56	–
IEMC gain from BSP		Swing		

== Notable people ==
- Bahoran Lal Maurya - Former MLA & Minister & Current MLC
- Yogesh Patel - Block Pramukh: After not getting ticket from BJP, he resigned and joined BSP

== See also ==
- Bareilly Lok Sabha constituency
- Bareilly district
- Sixteenth Legislative Assembly of Uttar Pradesh
- Uttar Pradesh Legislative Assembly
- Vidhan Bhawan
