= Ittehad-e-Millat Council =

- Abbreviation: IEMC
- Leader: Tauqeer Raza Khan
- President: Maulana Tauqeer Raza Khan
- Secretary: Maulana Rais Ashraf
- Founder: Maulana Tauqeer Raza Khan
- Founded: 2001
- Split from: Indian National Congress
- Headquarters: Bareilly, Uttar Pradesh
- Ideology: Islamism
- Political position: Right-wing
- Colours: Green
- ECI Status: Registered
- Seats in Lok Sabha: 0
- Seats in Rajya Sabha: 0 / 545
- Seats in Uttar Pradesh Legislative Assembly: 0 / 403

The Ittehad-e-Millat Council, (abbreviated IEMC) is a regional party in Uttar Pradesh founded in 2001 by Maulana Tauqeer Raza Khan.

The IEMC contested on 20 seats for the Sixteenth Legislative Assembly of Uttar Pradesh elections and managed to muster total 190,844 votes and win one seat in Bhojipura constituency.

== See also ==
- Uttar Pradesh Legislative Assembly
- 16th Legislative Assembly of Uttar Pradesh
- Politics of India
- List of political parties in India
