= Epidemic Diseases Act, 1897 =

Act of the Imperial Legislative Council

Imperial Legislative Council
- Long title: An Act to provide for the better prevention of the spread of Dangerous Epidemic Diseases.
- Citation: Act No. 3 of 1897
- Territorial extent: whole of India
- Enacted by: Imperial Legislative Council
- Assented to: 4 February 1897
- Commenced: 4 February 1897

Amended by
- Repealing and Amending Act, 1914 (10 of 1914); Devolution Act 1920 (38 of 1920); Epidemic Diseases (Amendment) Act, 2020 (34 of 2020); This Act has also been amended in its application to various regions and states such as the Epidemic Diseases (Punjab Amendment) Act, 1944 etc. and the extended to Dadra and Nagar Haveli (w.e.f. 1-7-1965) by Reg. 6 of 1963, s. 2 and Sch. etc.

Keywords
- epidemic, disease
- Status: In force (amended)

The Epidemic Diseases Act, 1897 is a law which was first enacted to tackle bubonic plague in Mumbai (formerly Bombay) in former British India. The law is meant for containment of epidemics by providing special powers that are required for the implementation of containment measures to control the spread of the disease.

== Legal provisions ==
Before the 2020 amendment Section 2 of the Act reads:

2. Power to take special measures and prescribe regulations as to dangerous epidemic disease

(1) When at any time the [State Government] is satisfied that [the State] or any part thereof is visited by, or threatened with, an outbreak of any dangerous epidemic disease, the [State Government], if [it] thinks that the ordinary provisions of the law for the time being in force are insufficient for the purpose, may take, or require or empower any person to take, such measures and, by public notice, prescribe such temporary regulations to be observed by the public or by any person or class of persons as [it] shall deem necessary to prevent the outbreak of such disease or the spread thereof, and may determine in what manner and by whom any expenses incurred (including compensation if any) shall be defrayed.

2A. Powers of Central Government

When the Central Government is satisfied that India or any part thereof is visited by, or threatened with, an outbreak of any dangerous epidemic disease and that the ordinary provisions of the law for the time being in force are insufficient to prevent the outbreak of such disease or the spread thereof, the Central Government may take measures and prescribe regulations for the inspection of any ship or vessel leaving or arriving at any port and for such detention thereof, or of any person intending to sail therein, or arriving thereby, as may be necessary.

3. Penalty.

Any person disobeying any regulation or order made under this Act shall be deemed to have committed an offence punishable under section 188 of the Indian Penal Code (45 of 1860).

4. Protection to persons acting under Act.

No suit or other legal proceeding shall lie against any person for anything done or in good faith intended to be done under this Act.

== 2020 Amendments ==
On 22 April 2020, the Government of India announced the promulgation of an ordinance, 'The Epidemic Diseases (Amendment) Ordinance, 2020 (5 of 2020)', to amend the act, adding provisions to punish those attacking doctors or health workers. The ordinance allows for up to seven years of jail for attacking doctors or health workers (including ASHA workers). The offense will be cognizable and non-bailable among other things. In addition to this, such cases need to be investigated in a time-bound and must be resolved in a year. Also, the law specifies that the guilty will have to pay twice the market value of the damaged property as compensation for damaging the assets of health care staff including vehicles and clinics.

The bill was introduced by the Minister of Health and Family Affairs, Harsh Vardhan. The Rajya Sabha approved the bill on 19 September 2020 and the Lok Sabha on 21 September 2020.

== Invocations ==
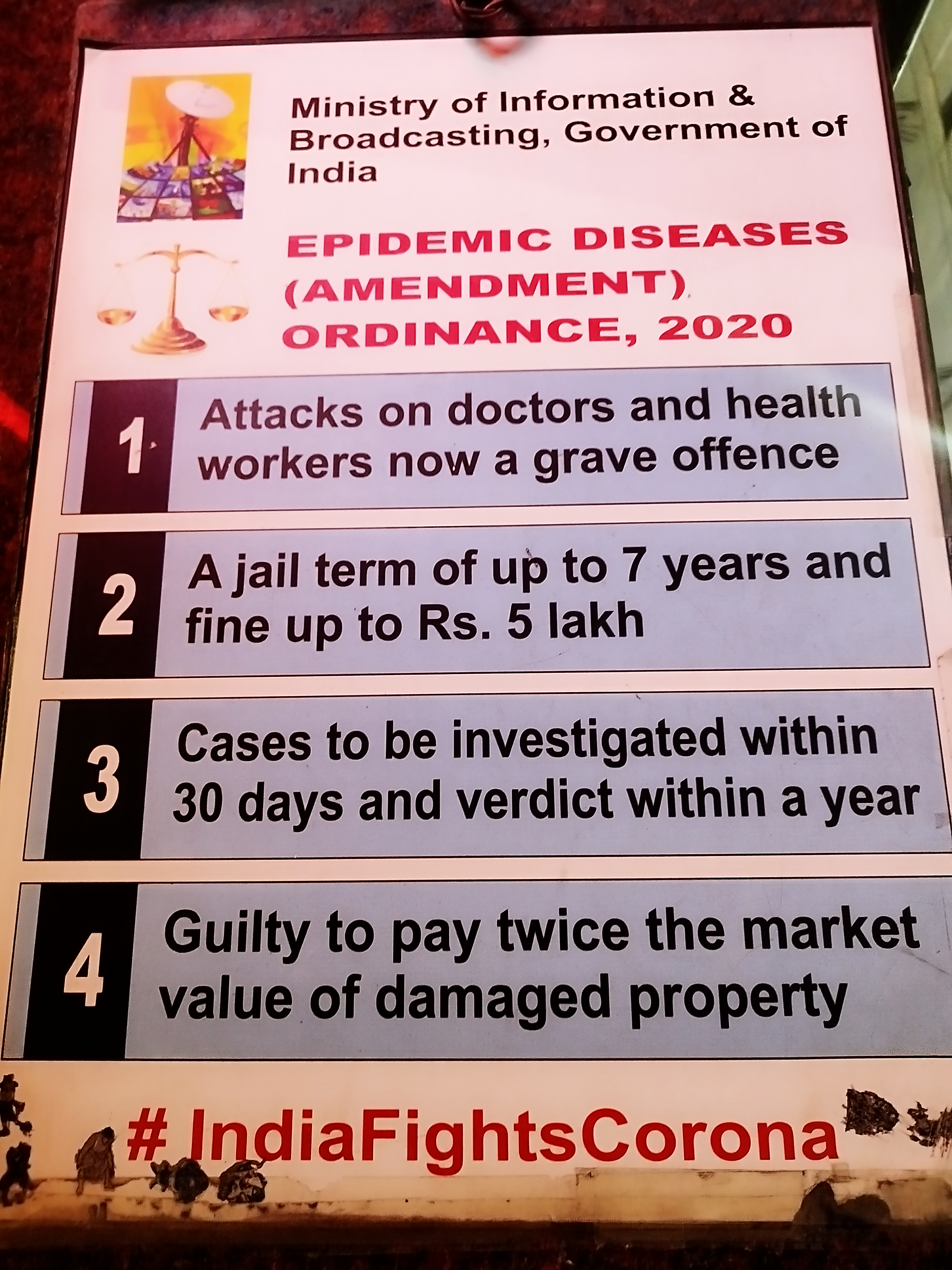
Special provisions inserted in the Epidemic Diseases Act by way of ordinance to protect healthcare professionals

The Act has been routinely used to contain various diseases in India such as swine flu, cholera, malaria and dengue. In 2018, the Act was enforced as cholera began to spread in a region of Gujarat. In 2015, it was used to deal with dengue and malaria in Chandigarh and in 2009 it was invoked in Pune to combat swine flu.

Following the COVID-19 pandemic the first state to invoke the act was Karnataka on March 10. A day later, the Cabinet Secretary of India on 11 March 2020 announced that all states and Union territories should invoke provisions of Section 2 of the Epidemic Diseases Act, 1897. Since March 2020, the act is being enforced across India in order to limit the spread of COVID-19.

== Bibliography ==
- Government of India (1897) [1897], The Epidemic Diseases Act, 1897 (PDF), India Code, National Informatics Centre
- Ministry of Law and Justice (22 April 2020), The Epidemic Diseases (Amendment) Ordinance, 2020 (PDF), The Gazette of India, Government of India
- Ministry of Health and Family Welfare, Epidemic disease act 1897 (PDF)
