= List of villages in Pilibhit district =

Villages of District pilibhit

There are 1,406 Villages in the Pilibhit district in the Indian state of Uttar Pradesh, in five tehsils and seven blocks. The tehsils are Pilibhit, Amaria, Puranpur, Kalinagar and Bisalpur. The blocks in the district Pilibhit are Amaria, Barkhera, Bilsanda, Bisalpur, Lalorikhera, Marori, Puranpur.

== List ==
List of villages in Pilibhit district
Name of Village	Gram Panchayat	Nearest town
Aadilabad Bisalpur	Adilabad Bisalpur	Pilibhit
Aamdar	Aamdar	Pilibhit
Aaraji Mathu Dandi	Meerapur Mustqil	Jahanabad
Abdullapur	Rampur T Mahrajpur	Puranpur
Abhaipur Chaina Nakti	Abhaipur Chaina Nakti	Pilibhit
Abhaipur Imlia	Bhairo Kalan	Pilibhit
Abhaipur J Jagatpur	Abhaipur J Jagatpur	Puranpur
Abhaipur M Shahgarh	Abhaipur M Shahgarh	Pilibhit
Abhaipur Madhopur	Abhaipur Madhopur	Pilibhit
Abhairajpur Urf Noorpur	Jagat	Pilibhit
Abhu Dandi	Goonchh Onch	Jahanabad
Adhkata	Adhkata	Bisalpur
Adilabad Marauri	Mirpur Hamupura	Bilsanda
Agyari	Agyari	Bisalpur
Ahirpura Nagla	Ahirpura Nagla	Bisalpur
Ahirwara Ehat	Ahirwara Must	Pilibhit
Ahirwara Must	Ahirwara Must	Pilibhit
Aidwara	Tanda Bijaisi Sahrai	Nyoria Husainpur
Aimi	Aimi	Pilibhit
Ajan	Basai Pureina	Pilibhit
Ajit Dandi	Ajit Dandi	Pilibhit
Ajitpur Bilha	Ajeetpur Vilah	Pilibhit
Ajitpur Mustqil	Ajitpur	Pilibhit
Ajitpur Sahrai	Ajitpur	Pilibhit
Akbarabad	Akbarabad	Bisalpur
Akbarganj Simra	Akbarganj Simra	Bisalpur
Akbarpur	Khiri Naubaramad	Pilibhit
Akhtyarpur	Jeohra Kalyanpur	Bisalpur
Alakthan	Alakthan	Pilibhit
Alam Dandi	Chand Dandi	Jahanabad
Alampur	Ulkari Dhakia	Gularia Bhindara
Aliapur	Aliapur	Pilibhit
Alipur	Navdia Dhanesh	Pilibhit
Allabaxpur	Malahpur Khajuria	Pilibhit
Allahabad Dewal	Ilahbaasdewal	Pilibhit
Allahbad Simra	Allahbad Simra	Bisalpur
Amarganj Ehatmali	Amarganj Mustqil	Jahanabad
Amarganj Mustqil	Amarganj Mustqil	Jahanabad
Amaria	Amaria	Pilibhit
Amiratpur T Ghungchahai	Shahbajpur	Puranpur
Amkhera	Amkhera Amaria	Pilibhit
Amkhera Jalalpur	Amkhirya T Pagar	Bilsanda
Amkhera Lucknow	Amkhera Lucknow	Pilibhit
Amkhiria	Mathna Jabti	Pilibhit
Amkhiriya	Amkhidiya	Pilibhit
Amkhirya T Pagar	Amkhirya T Pagar	Bilsanda
Amra Karor	Amra Karor	Bisalpur
Amraiya Kalan	Amraiya Kalan	Puranpur
Amraiya Khurd	Sabalpur M Rampur Fakire	Puranpur
Amrita Dalip Pur	Abhaipur M Shahgarh	Pilibhit
Amrita Khas	Amrita Khas	Pilibhit
Amritpur T Madho Tanda	Udaikaranpur	Puranpur
Anandpur Urf Bhagwantpur	Anandpur Urf Bhagwantpur	Pilibhit
Andabojhi	Kajari Niranjanpur	Puranpur
Andha	Andha	Bisalpur
Andrayan Ehatmali	Andrayan Mustqil	Pilibhit
Andrayan Mustqil	Andrayan Mustqil	Amaria
Ankhen	Udaipur Khurd	Puranpur
Ankoda	Ankoda	Pilibhit
Anwar Ganj	Maithi Saidulla Ganj	Nyoria Husainpur
Araji Baurakh	Aaraji Bhorakh	Pilibhit
Araji Chant Urf Tandola	Himmat Nager Urf Chiraidipur	Pilibhit
Araji Dahgala	Rura Ramnagar	Pilibhit
Araji Dhankuni	Dhankuni	Pilibhit
Araji Din Nagar	Aaraji Bhorakh	Pilibhit
Araji Jadaupur	Chandoi	Pilibhit
Araji Maqrooka Suhela	Dhan Gawan	Bisalpur
Araji Nand Simaria	Dandia Bhasaudi	Pilibhit
Araji Rampuria	Rampuria Sirsa	Pilibhit
Arauli	Arauli	Pilibhit
Arazi Basuia	Chutkuna	Pilibhit
Arazi Kundri	Mohammadpur Bhaja	Pilibhit
Arjunpur	Loharpura	Pilibhit
Arjunpur Ehat	Arjunpur Must	Pilibhit
Arjunpur Must	Arjunpur Must	Pilibhit
Arsia Bojh	Arsia Bojh	Pilibhit
Ashok Nagar	Ashok Nagar	Puranpur
Aspur	Aspur	Pilibhit
Aspur	Aspur	Pilibhit
Athkona	Atkona	Pilibhit
Athkona	Khirkia	Pilibhit
Atkona	Bhairo Kalan	Pilibhit
Aurangabad J Puranpur	Raghunathpur	Pilibhit
Auria	Auria	Nyoria Husainpur
Azad Nagar	Shree Nagar	Puranpur
Azampur Barkhera	Azampur Barkhera	Bisalpur
Baboora	Baboora	Bilsanda
Babrauwa	Marha Khurd Kalan	Pilibhit
Badhepura T Ghunchai	Dilawarpur	Pilibhit
Badhera	Badhera	Pilibhit
Bagnera Bagneri	Bagnera Bagneri	Jahanabad
Bagwa	Bagwa	Jahanabad
Bahadia	Bahadia	Bisalpur
Bahadurganj	N/A	Pilibhit
Bahadurpur	Dharampur Khurd	Pilibhit
Bahadurpur T Hukmi Ehat	Bahadurpur Hukmi	Pilibhit
Bahadurpur T Hukmi Must	Bahadurpur Hukmi	Bisalpur
Bahadurpur T Kishni	Kishni	Pilibhit
Bahruwa	Bahruwa	Gularia Bhindara
Baibaha	Kanja Haraia	Pilibhit
Baigpur	Parsadpur	Pilibhit
Baiju Nagar	Baijunagar	Pilibhit
Bailaha	Bailaha	Puranpur
Bakainia	Udaikaranpur	Pilibhit
Bakainia T Rampur Amrit	Bakainia T Rampur Amrit	Bilsanda
Bakainia Talluka Mahad	Bakainia Talluka Mahad	Pilibhit
Bakhshpur	Nisawa Nisaiya	Sitarganj
Bakhtapur	Bakhtapur	Puranpur
Baknia Dixit	Baknia Dixit	Pilibhit
Bakshpur	Bakshpur	Pilibhit
Bala Beni	Bilhari	Puranpur
Balkaranpur	Bhairo Kalan	Pilibhit
Balliya	Balliya	Pilibhit
Balpur Mafi	Balliya	Pilibhit
Balpur Patti Ehatmali	Kharuwa Mustqil	Pilibhit
Balpur Patti Mustqil	Kharuwa Mustqil	Pilibhit
Balrampur J Ranmustpur	Balrampur J Ranmustpur	Puranpur
Bamanpura Bhagirath	Bamanpura Bhagirath	Puranpur
Bamrauli	Bamrauli	Bilsanda
Banausa	Banausa	Pilibhit
Banda	Mania	Pilibhit
Bandarbojh	Bandar Bhoj	Pilibhit
Bangar	Bagar	Pilibhit
Bangla Urf Mitrasen	Bangla Urf Mitrasen	Pilibhit
Banjar Ganj	N/A	Puranpur
Banjaria	Banjaria	Puranpur
Banjaria Jamunia	Jamunia	Pilibhit
Banjaria Kallu	Niwar Aithpur Mustqil	Pilibhit
Bans Bojhi	Dilawarpur	Puranpur
Banskhera	Banskhera	Jahanabad
Bar Nawada	Bar Nawada	Pilibhit
Baradunwa	Baradunwa	Jahanabad
Baragaon	Baragaon	Pilibhit
Barahi	Barahi	Pilibhit
Barat Bojh	Barat Bojh	Pilibhit
Bargada	Dandia Raji	Pilibhit
Bargadia	Jagatpur	Pilibhit
Barha	Barha	Pilibhit
Barha Vikram	Barha Vikram	Pilibhit
Barhaini	Birhani	Sitarganj
Barhaiya	Barha Vikram	Pilibhit
Barhepura	Barhepura	Sitarganj
Barhepura Gharam	Gobal Patipura	Pilibhit
Barhepura Marauri	Barhepura Marauri	Bilsanda
Barhepura T Kusma	Barhepura T Kusma	Bisalpur
Bari Bhujia	Haripur T Chandpur	Puranpur
Barkhara	Bhikampur Urf Pranpur	Pilibhit
Barkhari	Bhikampur Urf Pranpur	Bisalpur
Barkhera Kata	Benipur	Pilibhit
Barkhera T Pasgawan	Barkhera T Pasgawan	Bisalpur
Barkhera Yasin	Purainia Ramgulam	Bisalpur
Barramak	Barramau	Bisalpur
Barsi Baley Urf Barsia	Barsi Baley Urf Barsia	Bisalpur
Barua Kuthara	Maini Gulria	Pilibhit
Basai Pureina	Basai Pureina	Pilibhit
Basantpur	Basantpur	Pilibhit
Basantpur Mustqil	N/A	Pilibhit
Basantpur Nauner	Barahi	Pilibhit
Basantpur Sahraee	Basantapur Mustqil	Pilibhit
Basara	Uganpur Marori	Bisalpur
Basola	Nagariya Tulagiri	Bilsanda
Basuiya Khas	Ahirwara Must	Bisalpur
Basupur	Basupur	Pilibhit
Bauni	Bauni	Pilibhit
Baurakh	Tanda Bijaisi Sahrai	Pilibhit
Bautha	Jamuniya J Jagatpur	Pilibhit
Behari Mustqil	Behari Mustqil	Pilibhit
Behri Ehatmali	Behari Mustqil	Pilibhit
Behta	Behta	Bilsanda
Behti	Behti	Bilsanda
Bela Pokhra	Bharatpur	Nyoria Husainpur
Belabhaur Ehatmali	Uganpur	Pilibhit
Belabhaur Mustqil	Uganpur	Pilibhit
Belapokhra	Birhani	Majhola
Benipur	Benipur	Pilibhit
Bera	Bera	Pilibhit
Bhadeg Kanja	Bhadeg Kanja	Pilibhit
Bhadera	Bhadera	Pilibhit
Bhaderi	Bhadera	Pilibhit
Bhadsara	Udara	Gularia Bhindara
Bhaga Mohammadganj Ehatmali	Bhaga Mohammadganj Mustqil	Pilibhit
Bhaga Mohammadganj Mustqil	Bhaga Mohammadganj Mustqil	Pilibhit
Bhagautipur	Bhgautipur	Pilibhit
Bhagautipur	Bilandpur Ashok	Puranpur
Bhagawantpur Karor Ehat	Abhaipur Chaina Nakti	Pilibhit
Bhagawantpur Karor Must	Abhaipur Chaina Nakti	Pilibhit
Bhagawantpur T Kajar Bojhi	Lucknow Kalan	Pilibhit
Bhagawantpur T Kuluhagarha	Kadher Chaura T Gajraula	Pilibhit
Bhagawantpur Urf Bhimpur	Parsadpur	Puranpur
Bhagawatipur Dhura	Jithania	Pilibhit
Bhagawatipur Kasba	Barat Bojh	Jahanabad
Bhagi Dandi	Bhagi Dandi	Jahanabad
Bhagtania	Bhindara	Pilibhit
Bhagvantpur Bajhera	Bhagvantpur Bajhera	Lalauri Khera
Bhagwantpur M Karobojh	Simraya T Ghungchihai	Pilibhit
Bhagwantpur T Ghunchai	Shahbajpur	Puranpur
Bhainsana Gwalpur Ehatmali	Bhainsana Gwalpur Must	Bisalpur
Bhainsana Gwalpur Must	N/A	Pilibhit
Bhainshai Parvatpur	Jagipur Jaitpur	Pilibhit
Bhair Puri	Lucknow Kalan	Bisalpur
Bhairo Kalan	Bhairo Kalan	Pilibhit
Bhairo Khurd	Bhairo Kalan	Pilibhit
Bhaisaha	Barhepura	Pilibhit
Bhaisaha Ehatmali	Sathrapur Mu	Pilibhit
Bhaisaha Mustqil	Sathrapur Mu	Pilibhit
Bhaisasur	Simra T Ghunchai	Puranpur
Bhaista Jalalpur	Musaili Mustqil	Pilibhit
Bhamaura	Bhamaura	Nyoria Husainpur
Bhan Bojhi	Jamuniya J Jagatpur	Pilibhit
Bhan Dandi	Bhan Dandi	Pilibhit
Bhanpur	Bhanpur	Jahanabad
Bhara Pachpera	Birhani	Gularia Bhindara
Bharara	Maini Gulria	Pilibhit
Bharari	Maini Gulria	Pilibhit
Bharatpur	Bharatpur	Nyoria Husainpur
Bharatpur	Bharatpur	Puranpur
Bhasunda	Bhasunda	Pilibhit
Bhatta Khera	Biharipur J Itauria	Pilibhit
Bhauna	Bhauna	Jahanabad
Bhauni	Bhauni	Pilibhit
Bhaurua	Rajpur Kandari	Pilibhit
Bhavsi	Baijunagar	Puranpur
Bhawaniganj	Kabirpur Kasganja	Pilibhit
Bhawanipur T Gajraula	Dharampur Khurd	Pilibhit
Bhawanipur T Ghunchai	Matena Taluke Ghunchai	Puranpur
Bhaypur	Churra Sakatpur	Pilibhit
Bhaypur	Bhaypur	Puranpur
Bhgawantpur T Kareli	Pipria Singhipur	Pilibhit
Bhikampur	Loharpura	Pilibhit
Bhikampur Urf Pranpur	Bhikampur Urf Pranpur	Pilibhit
Bhikharipur	Bhikharipur	Pilibhit
Bhilaiya Gaon Khera	Bhilaiya Gaon Khera	Pilibhit
Bhimpur Naugaja	Bhimpur Naugaja	Pilibhit
Bhindara	Bhindara	Pilibhit
Bhitera	Bhitera	Bisalpur
Bhogapur	Sukatia Jaskaranpur	Pilibhit
Bhooda Sarainda Mustqil	Bhooda Sarainda Mustqil	Pilibhit
Bhooda Sarainda Sahrai	Bhoorda Sarainda Saha	Pilibhit
Bhoora	Nagariya Tulagiri	Bilsanda
Bhoora	Bhura	Pilibhit
Bhoora Gorakh Dibbi	Nagria Khurd Kalan	Pilibhit
Bhopatpur	Bhopatpur	Pilibhit
Bhopatpur	Bhopatpur	Pilibhit
Bhura	Aliapur	Majhola
Bhuria Ramchandra	Tanda Bijaisi Sahrai	Pilibhit
Bichpuri T Int Gaon	Dhan Gawan	Pilibhit
Bichpuri T Jogi Ther	Parasiram Kishan	Bisalpur
Bidhipur	Vidhipur	Puranpur
Biharipur	Tanda Bijaisi Sahrai	Pilibhit
Biharipur Heera	Biharipur Heera	Pilibhit
Biharipur J Itauria	Biharipur J Itauria	Puranpur
Biharipur Kamirkha	Biharipur Kamirkha	Bisalpur
Biharipur Khurd	Hempur	Pilibhit
Biharipur M Rampur Fakire	Rampur Fakire	Pilibhit
Bijauri Khurd Kalan	Dhuria Paliya	Pilibhit
Bijulha	Abhaipur M Shahgarh	Pilibhit
Bilai Pasiapur	N/A	Jahanabad
Bilaiya Makranpur	Pandri Marauri	Pilibhit
Bilandpur Ashokpur	Bilandpur Ashok	Puranpur
Bilaspur	Bilaspur	Bilsanda
Bilaspur	Bilaspur	Pilibhit
Bilganwa	Bilganwa	Pilibhit
Bilhara Mafi	Fulaieya	Pilibhit
Bilhari	Bilhari	Pilibhit
Binaur	N/A	Pilibhit
Binaura Khas T Madho Tanda	Kapoorpur	Puranpur
Binaura T Gajraula	Grant No21 Urf Dhakkachat	Puranpur
Bindhuwa	Bindua	Jahanabad
Birahampur	Piparia Majhara	Puranpur
Birampur	Pandria	Puranpur
Biriya	Imalia Marauri	Pilibhit
Birkhera T Madhau Tanda	Bhimpur Naugaja	Pilibhit
Birkhera T Maharajpur	Dhuria Paliya	Puranpur
Birsinghpur	Bahadia	Pilibhit
Bishanpur Ehatmali	Fardia	Pilibhit
Bishanpur Mustaqil	Fardia	Pilibhit
Bitaunia Kalan	Sukhdaspur Navadia	Pilibhit
Bitaunia Khurd	Sukhdaspur Navadia	Pilibhit
Bithaura Kalan	Bithaura Kalan	Pilibhit
Bithaura Khurd	Bithaura Khurd	Nyoria Husainpur
Bithra	Bithra	Pilibhit
Bodi Bhoor	Bodi Bhoor	Pilibhit
Budhauli	Budhauli	Bisalpur
Budhaulia	Galra Machwapur	Pilibhit
Buhita	Buhita	Bisalpur
Burhia J Itauria	Burhia J Itauria	Pilibhit
Chahlora	Chahlora	Pilibhit
Chak Sidhpur	Jadopur Patti	Pilibhit
Chaka	Chaka	Pilibhit
Chakora	Kajari Niranjanpur	Pilibhit
Chakpur T Ajitpur Bilha	Simra T Ghunchai	Puranpur
Chakpur T Anandpur	Dhakia Kesharpur	Pilibhit
Chand Dandi	Chand Dandi	Pilibhit
Chandia Hajara	Chandia Hajara	Puranpur
Chandoi	Chandoi	Pilibhit
Chandokha	Ajeetpur Vilah	Pilibhit
Chandpur	Kalyanpur T Kareli	Bisalpur
Chandpur	Chandopur	Pilibhit
Chandpura	Chandpura	Bisalpur
Chandpura Tarai	Dhuria Paliya	Pilibhit
Chandra Nagar	Ramnagar	Puranpur
Chanduiya	Sherpur Makrandpur	Puranpur
Chant Firojpur	Chant Firojpur	Puranpur
Chaprua Kuiya	Chaprua Kuiya	Bilsanda
Charkhaula	Charkhaula	Pilibhit
Chat Dang	Chat Dang	Pilibhit
Chathia Nyaz	Chatiya Niyaz Ahmad	Pilibhit
Chathia Sewaram	Chathia Sewaram	Pilibhit
Chathiya Hilgi	Chatiya Hilgi	Bilsanda
Chatipur	Chatipur	Puranpur
Chaturbhojpur	Karnapur	Pilibhit
Chaukhandi	Barsi Baley Urf Barsia	Pilibhit
Chaura Khera	Chura Khera	Pilibhit
Chausar Hardopatti Ehat	Chausar Hardopatti Must	Pilibhit
Chausar Hardopatti Must	Chausar Hardopatti Must	Bisalpur
Chausar Pandia	Kasimpur	Pilibhit
Chausara	Chausara	Bisalpur
Chidaiyadeh	Chidaiyadeh	Pilibhit
Chinaura Ehatmali	Chinaura Mustqil	Pilibhit
Chinaura Mustqil	Chinaura Mustqil	Pilibhit
Chintapur	Ghanshyampur	Bilsanda
Chitarpur	Bhimpur Naugaja	Pilibhit
Chithiya Bhaisaha	Chithiya Bhaisaha	Jahanabad
Chudaila	Piparia Bhaja	Pilibhit
Churra Sakatpur	Churra Sakatpur	Bisalpur
Chutkuna	Chutkuna	Bisalpur
Dabka	Barhepura	Sitarganj
Daga	Daga	Pilibhit
Dahgala	Dahgala	Pilibhit
Dalelpur	Kabirpur Kasganja	Pilibhit
Dalippur Itauria	Abhaipur Madhopur	Puranpur
Damgarhi Miyuna	Nadha T Madho Tanda	Pilibhit
Damupura	Andha	Bisalpur
Dandia	Dandiya	Pilibhit
Dandia Bhagat	Dandia Bhagat	Pilibhit
Dandia Bhasaudi	Dandia Bhasaudi	Pilibhit
Dandia Lachchhi	Patrasia	Bisalpur
Dandia Raji	Dandia Raji	Bisalpur
Dandol	Matena Taluke Ghunchai	Pilibhit
Dang	Dang	Pilibhit
Dateli	Abhaipur Madhopur	Pilibhit
Daulapur	Lakha Khas	Pilibhit
Daulatganj Ehatmali	Kharuwa Mustqil	Pilibhit
Daulatganj Mustqil	Kharuwa Mustqil	Pilibhit
Daulatpur Heera	Daulatpur Heera	Bisalpur
Daulatpur Patti	Daulatpur Patti	Pilibhit
Daulatpur Ta Chandpur	N/A	Pilibhit
Dayalpur	Dayalpur	Pilibhit
Deen Nagar Khujha	Aaraji Bhorakh	Nyoria Husainpur
Dehrum Mandria Mustqil	Dehrum Mandria Mustqil	Pilibhit
Deohana	Deohana	Pilibhit
Deokalia	Bhainpura	Pilibhit
Deoni Kesharpur	Dioni Kesharpur	Pilibhit
Deora	Mosepur Kalan	Pilibhit
Deorajpur	Deorajpur	Bisalpur
Deorania	Deorania	Gularia Bhindara
Deori	Deori	Pilibhit
Deoria Kalan	Deoria Kalan	Pilibhit
Deoria Khurd	Mirpur Harraipur	Bilsanda
Desh Nager	Desh Nager	Pilibhit
Devipur	Devipur	Pilibhit
Devipura	Saraura	Pilibhit
Dhak Riya	Nagra Rata	Bisalpur
Dhaka J Puranpur	Dhaka Ja Puranpur	Pilibhit
Dhakia Badlu	Dhakiya Badlu	Pilibhit
Dhakia Jalalpur	Dhakia Jalalpur	Bilsanda
Dhakia Kesharpur	Dhakia Kesharpur	Pilibhit
Dhakia Natha	Dhakia Natha	Jahanabad
Dhakia Ranjeet	Gajraula	Pilibhit
Dhakia T Maharajpur	Nagria Khurd Kalan	Pilibhit
Dhakiya Mahak	Pakria Mangli	Pilibhit
Dhakwara	Dhakbara	Pilibhit
Dhamela Dhamali	N/A	Nyoria Husainpur
Dhan Gawan	Dhan Gawan	Bisalpur
Dhanega	Dhanega	Pilibhit
Dhankuna	Dhankuna	Pilibhit
Dhankuni	Dhankuni	Pilibhit
Dhar Bargada	N/A	Pilibhit
Dharampur Kalan	Dharampur Khurd	Puranpur
Dharampur Khurd	Dharampur Khurd	Puranpur
Dharlia	Puraina	Pilibhit
Dharmangadbad	Dharmangadpur	Pilibhit
Dheram	Dheram	Pilibhit
Dherum Mandria Sahrai	Dheram Mandariya Saha	Pilibhit
Dhimerpura	Chathia Sewaram	Bisalpur
Dhuksi Ehatmali	N/A	Pilibhit
Dhuksi Mustqil	Dhuksi Mustqil	Pilibhit
Dhundhari	Dhundhari	Jahanabad
Dhuri Khurd	Makrandpur Roshan Singh	Bisalpur
Dhuria	Dhuria Paliya	Pilibhit
Dhuriya Khurd	Kalyanpur T Kareli	Pilibhit
Dilawarpur	Dilawarpur	Pilibhit
Din Nagar	Kallia	Pilibhit
Dinarpur	Dinarpur	Jahanabad
Diuni Bahadurganj	Diyoni Bhadurganj	Pilibhit
Diura	Maanpur Hatua	Pilibhit
Diyoni	Bhura	Majhola
Dodpur Khallapur	Dodpur Khallapur	Pilibhit
Dudhia Kalan	Dudhia Khurd	Puranpur
Dudhia Khurd	Dudhia Khurd	Pilibhit
Dugipur Bara Gaon	Kitnapur	Bisalpur
Dulhapur	Sultanpur	Puranpur
Dunda	Jamuniya J Jagatpur	Puranpur
Durjanpur Kalan	Durjanpur Kalan	Pilibhit
Faijullaganj	Maini Gulria	Pilibhit
Faizullaganj Urf Karela	Sherganj Dharmangadpur	Pilibhit
Fajilpur	Navdia Dhanesh	Pilibhit
Fardia	Fardia	Pilibhit
Faridpur Bara	Majhalia Mustqil	Jahanabad
Faridpur Hasan	Udara	Gularia Bhindara
Fatepur Khurd	N/A	Puranpur
Fattepur	Fatepur Khurd	Pilibhit
Fazilpur Urf Raipur	Pasgawan	Bisalpur
Fulaiya	Gidhaur	Majhola
Gabhia Sahrai	Gabhia Sahrai	Pilibhit
Gadihar	Fatepur Khurd	Pilibhit
Gadyana	Bilhari	Puranpur
Gagnapur	Gidhaur	Majhola
Gahluia	Gahluia	Jahanabad
Gahluiya	Panchpera Purna	Bisalpur
Gahluiya	Jadaupur	Pilibhit
Gaibojh	Gayabhoj	Pilibhit
Gairatpur Jabti	Gairatpur Japti	Puranpur
Gajhera	Gajhera	Pilibhit
Gajheri	Gajheri	Pilibhit
Gajna Sidharpur	Gajna Sindharpur	Bisalpur
Gajraula	Jagat	Pilibhit
Gajraula	Gajraula	Pilibhit
Gajraula Kalan	Shahgarh	Pilibhit
Gajraula Kalan Mustqil	Gajrola Kala	Pilibhit
Gajraula Kalan Saharai	Gajraula Kalan Saharai	Pilibhit
Gajraula Khas	Gajraula Khas	Puranpur
Gajraula Khurd	Shahgarh	Pilibhit
Gajraulla Jabti	Kalyanpur	Puranpur
Galra Machwapur	Galra Machwapur	Pilibhit
Gangupur	Gangupur	Bisalpur
Ganjraha	Maseet	Bisalpur
Garha Kalan	Garha Kalan	Pilibhit
Garha Khurd	Navadia Durjanpur	Pilibhit
Garha Range	N/A	Puranpur
Garibpur	Ajeetpur Vilah	Puranpur
Garwa Khera	Haripur T Chandpur	Pilibhit
Gauhania	Gauhania	Bilsanda
Gauhania	Gauhania Marori	Pilibhit
Gauhar	Gauhar	Nyoria Husainpur
Gaunera	Gaunera	Pilibhit
Gauneri Badi	Gauneri Badi	Jahanabad
Gauneri Dan	Gauneri Dan	Pilibhit
Gaura	Gaura	Pilibhit
Gautam Nagar	Vijai Nagar	Puranpur
Gazipur	Gazipur	Pilibhit
Gazipur Kunda	Gazipur Kunda	Bisalpur
Ghanshyampur	Ghanshyampur	Bilsanda
Ghanshyampur	Ajeetpur Vilah	Puranpur
Ghatampur	Shahbajpur	Puranpur
Ghoorkoni	Dinarpur	Jahanabad
Ghung Chaiya	Ghung Chaiya	Ghughchaiya
Ghungchihai	Ghungchihai	Puranpur
Ghunghaura	Ghunghaura	Pilibhit
Ghuri Khas	Ghuri Khas	Bisalpur
Ghuri Patti	Ghuri Khas	Pilibhit
Gidhaur	Gidhaur	Majhola
Gobal Patipura	Gobal Patipura	Pilibhit
Goharpur	Sindhaura Kharagpur	Bilsanda
Goonchh	Goonchh Onch	Jahanabad
Gopal Nagar	Gular Bojh	Sitarganj
Gopalpur	N/A	Bilsanda
Gopalpur	Gopalpur	Puranpur
Govindpur Mohanpur	Navadia Durjanpur	Puranpur
Grant No16 Urf Rampur	Tanda Chhatrapati	Pilibhit
Grant No17 Urf Gurbaxpur	Abhaipur J Jagatpur	Pilibhit
Grant No1urf Banganj	Grant No1urf Banganj	Pilibhit
Grant No2 Urf Bishanpur	N/A	Pilibhit
Grant No21 Urf Dhakkachat	Grant No21 Urf Dhakkachat	Puranpur
Gulalpur Khamaria	Bagar	Pilibhit
Gular Bojh	Gular Bojh	Jahanabad
Gularhai	Narainpur Ghunchai	Pilibhit
Gularia	Gularia Bhoopsingh	Pilibhit
Gularia Bhindara	N/A	Pilibhit
Gularia Bithra	Bharatpur	Pilibhit
Gularia Dulhan	Gulariya Dulhan	Pilibhit
Gularia Jafarpur	Guriya Gafarpur	Pilibhit
Gularia Marauri	Harunagar Urf Naua Nagla	Pilibhit
Gularia Radhey	Badhera	Bisalpur
Gularia Sakatpur	Amarganj Mustqil	Jahanabad
Gulenda Gautia	Gulenda Gautia	Pilibhit
Gulraha	Bhawaniganj	Puranpur
Gulrahai	Patihan	Pilibhit
Gulria Khas	Gulariya Khaas	Pilibhit
Gulria M Balkaranpur	Bhairo Kalan	Pilibhit
Gulria M Khata	Raghunathpur	Pilibhit
Gulria Mashmula Kasba	Kasimpur	Bisalpur
Gulria T Sujnee	Sujnee	Pilibhit
Gunhan	Ramnagra	Pilibhit
Gurchaha	N/A	Puranpur
Gurdah	Karnapur	Pilibhit
Guteha	Guteha	Pilibhit
Gyaspur	Gobal Patipura	Pilibhit
Hafiznagar Banhai	Hafiznagar Banhai	Bisalpur
Haidarabad	Saddarpur	Pilibhit
Haldi Denga	Daga	Pilibhit
Hameerpur	Hameerpur	Pilibhit
Handa	Handa	Pilibhit
Har Raipur	Har Raipur	Pilibhit
Haraiya Urf Harkiswan Pur	Haraiya Urf Harkiswan Pur	Pilibhit
Harchuia	Harchuia	Pilibhit
Hardaspur	Hardaspur	Majhola
Hargaon	Malahpur Khajuria	Pilibhit
Harharpur	Chatiya Hilgi	Bilsanda
Harharpur Dhura	Gular Bojh	Jahanabad
Harharpur Hasan	Harharpur Hasan	Pilibhit
Haripur	N/A	Puranpur
Haripur Kalan	Haripur Kalan	Puranpur
Haripur M Jatpura	Jatpura	Pilibhit
Haripur M Phulhar	Haripur M Phulhar	Pilibhit
Haripur T Ajitpur Bilha	Shahbajpur	Puranpur
Haripur T Chandpur	Haripur T Chandpur	Pilibhit
Haripur Udaipur	Haripur Kalan	Puranpur
Harkishanpur	Rura Ramnagar	Pilibhit
Harrai	Harrai	Bisalpur
Harraia	N/A	Puranpur
Harraipur	Mirpur Harraipur	Bilsanda
Harsinghpur	Parsadpur	Pilibhit
Harunagar Urf Naua Nagla	Harunagar Urf Naua Nagla	Bisalpur
Hasain Nagar	Hasan Nagar	Pilibhit
Hasan Nagar	Bhauna	Pilibhit
Hashampur	Rauhatania	Pilibhit
Hatua	Vikrampur	Pilibhit
Hatua Bijulahi	Hatua Bijulahi	Pilibhit
Hempur	Hempur	Bilsanda
Hetam Dandi	Balliya	Sitarganj
Himkarpur	Andrayan Mustqil	Amaria
Himmat Nager Urf Chiraidipur	Himmat Nager Urf Chiraidipur	Pilibhit
Hirapur Diyuhi Ehat	Arjunpur Must	Pilibhit
Hirapur Diyuhi Must	Arjunpur Must	Pilibhit
Hirapur Khurd	Rotapur	Bisalpur
Husainpur Kalan	Bhaypur	Puranpur
Husainpur Khurd	Bilhari	Puranpur
Igdhara	Igdhara	Pilibhit
Imalia Gangi	Andha	Pilibhit
Imalia Marauri	Andha	Bisalpur
Imam Nagar	Arauli	Pilibhit
Imlaya Talluka Phuta Kuwan	Kuraiya Talluka Phuta Kuwan	Bisalpur
Imlia	Laha	Puranpur
Int Gaon	Int Gaon	Bisalpur
Inta Rora	Inta Rora	Bisalpur
Iradatpur Pagar	Iradatpur Pagar	Bilsanda
Isapur	Kuraiya Kalan	Bilsanda
Itauria J Biharipur	Itauria J Biharipur	Pilibhit
Itauria T Ajitpur Bilha	Shahbajpur	Puranpur
Jadaupur	Chandoi	Pilibhit
Jadaupur	Jadaupur	Puranpur
Jadaupur Khurd	Kesarpur Kalan	Pilibhit
Jadish Pur	Panchpera Purna	Pilibhit
Jadopur Khurd	Allahbad Simra	Pilibhit
Jadopur Nattha	Jadopur Natha	Pilibhit
Jadopur Patti	Jadopur Patti	Pilibhit
Jagannathpur	Muradpur Mati	Puranpur
Jagat Ehatmali	Jagat	Pilibhit
Jagat Mustqil	Jagat	Pilibhit
Jagatpur	Ora Jhar	Bilsanda
Jagatpur	Jagatpur	Pilibhit
Jagatpur T Gajraula	Pandria	Puranpur
Jagatpur T Ghungchahai	Jamuniya J Jagatpur	Puranpur
Jagdish Pur	Saraura	Jahanabad
Jagipur Chhitaunia	Khera	Pilibhit
Jagipur Jaitpur	Jagipur Jaitpur	Pilibhit
Jahanabad	Jahanabad Dehat	Jahanabad
Jahidganj	Biharipur J Itauria	Pilibhit
Jaipalpur	Pipria Singhipur	Bilsanda
Jairampur	Banjaria	Puranpur
Jaitpur Mustqil	Jaitpur Mustqil	Pilibhit
Jaitpur Saharai	Jaitpur Mustqil	Pilibhit
Jakandanpur	Muradpur Mati	Puranpur
Jaleshwar Urf Jagatpur	Piparia Majhara	Puranpur
Jallapur	Jallapur	Pilibhit
Jallupur	Gularia Bhoopsingh	Puranpur
Jamgahan	Udara	Gularia Bhindara
Jamlapur	Gauneri Badi	Pilibhit
Jamunia	Jamunia	Pilibhit
Jamunia Khas	Jamunia Khas	Pilibhit
Jamunia Mahua	Jamunia Mahua	Pilibhit
Jamunia T Int Gaon	Jamunia T Int Gaon	Bisalpur
Jamuniya J Jagatpur	Jamuniya J Jagatpur	Puranpur
Jangrauli Asha	Jangrauli Asha	Pilibhit
Jangrauli Pul	Jangrauli Pul	Pilibhit
Jankapur	Narainpur Ghunchai	Puranpur
Jar Kalliya	Jar Kalliya	Barkhera
Jara Bujurg	Ruriya Salempur	Pilibhit
Jara T Madho Tanda	Sisaiya	Pilibhit
Jarauli	N/A	Pilibhit
Jari	Sisaiya	Pilibhit
Jasai Nagar	Pakria T Deoria	Bisalpur
Jasauli Diwari	Jasauli Diwari	Pilibhit
Jaswantpur	Kadher Chaura T Gajraula	Pilibhit
Jatipur	Jatipur	Pilibhit
Jatpura	Jatpura Amaria	Pilibhit
Jatpura	Jatpura	Pilibhit
Jauna Puri	Jauna Puri	Pilibhit
Jeohra Kalyanpur	Jeohra Kalyanpur	Pilibhit
Jethapur Kalan	Jethapur Khurd	Pilibhit
Jethapur Khurd	Jethapur Khurd	Pilibhit
Jhampa	Firsa Churra	Pilibhit
Jhurkuriya	Kabirpur Kasganja	Pilibhit
Jiraunia	Jiraunia	Pilibhit
Jithania	Jithania	Pilibhit
Jogi Ther	Jogi Ther	Pilibhit
Jogia Bari	Sindhaura Kharagpur	Bilsanda
Jograjpur	Jograjpur	Puranpur
Kabeerganj	Kabeerganj	Puranpur
Kabirpur Kasganja	Kabirpur Kasganja	Puranpur
Kadhaiya	Kadaiya	Puranpur
Kadher Chaura T Gajraula	Kadher Chaura T Gajraula	Pilibhit
Kahdaiya Navada	Kariya Nabada	Jahanabad
Kaichu Tanda	Kaichu Tanda	Pilibhit
Kaichua	Manpur Bisalpur	Pilibhit
Kaim	Kaim	Pilibhit
Kaima	Chahlora	Pilibhit
Kaimor	Kaimor	Majhola
Kainch	Kainch	Pilibhit
Kaithulia	Safaura	Bisalpur
Kajari Niranjanpur	Kajari Niranjanpur	Puranpur
Kakraua	Devipur	Pilibhit
Kakrauwa	N/A	Pilibhit
Kalayanpur Naugwan	Kalayanpur Naugwan	Pilibhit
Kallia	Kallia	Nyoria Husainpur
Kallia Kuraiya	Dodpur Khallapur	Pilibhit
Kalyanpur	Kalyanpur	Puranpur
Kalyanpur Chakratirth	Kalyanpur Chakratirth	Jahanabad
Kalyanpur Khas	Kalyanpur Khas	Pilibhit
Kalyanpur Manth	Pakariya T Amariya	Bisalpur
Kalyanpur T Behti	Behti	Bilsanda
Kalyanpur T Kareli	Kalyanpur T Kareli	Bilsanda
Kanakore	Kanakore	Jahanabad
Kandharapur Ehat	Chutkuna	Bisalpur
Kandharapur Mustkil	Chutkuna	Bisalpur
Kangawan	Kangawan	Pilibhit
Kanja Haraia	Kanja Haraia	Pilibhit
Kanja Khera	Pata Bojhi	Pilibhit
Kanja Nath	Kanjanath Patti	Jahanabad
Kanjia Singhpur Bhauria	Gabhia Sahrai	Pilibhit
Kanpara	Khajuria Nibiram	Bilsanda
Kanpara	Kabirpur Kasganja	Puranpur
Kanpari	Kanpari	Bisalpur
Kapoorpur	Kapoorpur	Pilibhit
Karanpur Chak	Karanpur Chak	Bisalpur
Karanpur Layakram	Adilabad Bisalpur	Pilibhit
Kareli	Kareli	Bilsanda
Karelia	Karelia	Pilibhit
Kargaina Kargaini	Kargaina Kargaini	Jahanabad
Kargaina Peera	Kargaina Peera	Jahanabad
Karher Chaura J Puranpur	Raghunathpur	Pilibhit
Karkhera	Nagria Fatehpur Must	Pilibhit
Karmapur Mafi	Karmapur Maafi	Pilibhit
Karnaiya	Harunagar Urf Naua Nagla	Bisalpur
Karnapur	Karnapur	Barkhera
Karnapur	Karnapur	Pilibhit
Karobojh	Simraya T Ghungchihai	Pilibhit
Karod	Karod	Barkhera
Kasba Patti	Sukatia Jaskaranpur	Pilibhit
Kasimpur	Kasimpur	Bisalpur
Kastua	Muraina	Bilsanda
Kataia Pandari	Birhani	Gularia Bhindara
Kataiya	Kataiya	Pilibhit
Kataiya	Sabalpur M Rampur Fakire	Puranpur
Kataiya Islam	Kataiya Islam	Jahanabad
Katakbara	Katakbara	Bisalpur
Katakwara	Maini Gulria	Pilibhit
Katmata	Katmata	Pilibhit
Katmati	Barhepura	Sitarganj
Katpura	Bhopatpur	Pilibhit
Kauhara	Pandri Marauri	Bilsanda
Kazar Bojhi	Kazar Bojhi	Bisalpur
Keharpur J Itauria	Biharipur J Itauria	Pilibhit
Kesarpur	Balliya	Pilibhit
Kesarpur Kalan	Kesarpur Kalan	Puranpur
Kesharpur T Gajraula	Banjaria	Pilibhit
Keshopur	Prithipur	Pilibhit
Keshopur T Anandpur	Bhimpur Naugaja	Pilibhit
Keshopur T Ghunchai	Keshopur T Ghunchai	Pilibhit
Keshpur T Madhotanda	Madho Tanda	Pilibhit
Keulara	Hardaspur	Majhola
Khag	Khag	Pilibhit
Khagai	Kazar Bojhi	Pilibhit
Khai Khera	Mohanpur	Pilibhit
Khairpur T Jatpura	Tandola	Pilibhit
Khajuria	Majhara Ta Maharajpur	Pilibhit
Khajuria Nibiram	Khajuria Nibiram	Bilsanda
Khajuria Panchpera	Khajuria Panchpera	Bisalpur
Khakra	Loharpura	Pilibhit
Khakuma	Richhola Ghasi Must	Pilibhit
Khali Nabada Mustqil	Fardia	Pilibhit
Khali Navada	Fardia	Pilibhit
Khamaraia J Jagatpur	Shahbajpur	Puranpur
Khamaria Kalan	Patihan	Puranpur
Khamaria Pandri	Khamaria Pandri	Pilibhit
Khamghat	Baknia Dixit	Pilibhit
Khamria Dalelganj	Khamria Dalelganj	Jahanabad
Khamria Navdia	Nagria Fatehpur Must	Pilibhit
Khamria Patti	Khamria Patti	Pilibhit
Khamriapul	Khamriapul	Jahanabad
Khandepur	Khandepur	Bisalpur
Khandepur	Sherpur Makrandpur	Pilibhit
Khanka Uchasia	Khanka Uchasia	Bisalpur
Khanpur Chukat Hai	Ghungchihai	Pilibhit
Khanpur Urf Birampur	Khanpur Urf Birampur	Pilibhit
Kharagpur	Bithaura Khurd	Nyoria Husainpur
Kharagpur Kalan	Kharagpur Kalan	Bisalpur
Kharagpur Khurd	Parai	Pilibhit
Kharaunsa	Kharunsa	Pilibhit
Kharausa	Sherpur Makrandpur	Puranpur
Khardaha	Lamua	Pilibhit
Khardai	Khardai	Bisalpur
Kharuwa Ehatmali	Kharuwa Mustqil	Pilibhit
Kharuwa Mustqil	Kharuwa Mustqil	Pilibhit
Khaspur	Khaspur	Pilibhit
Khat Diora	Bhilaiya Gaon Khera	Pilibhit
Khat Diyura	Sukhdaspur Navadia	Pilibhit
Khata	Amraiya Kalan	Pilibhit
Khera	Khera	Pilibhit
Khijarpur	Seharmau Uttari	Pilibhit
Khiri Naubaramad	Khiri Naubaramad	Pilibhit
Khirka	Bahruwa	Pilibhit
Khirkia	Khirkia	Pilibhit
Khirkia Bargadia	Khirkiya Bargadiya	Puranpur
Khujraha	Khujraha	Pilibhit
Khundara	Khundara	Pilibhit
Khutrai	Khutraya	Bilsanda
Kiratpur T Madho Tanda	Khiri Naubaramad	Pilibhit
Kiratpur Urf Jainpur	Banjaria	Puranpur
Kishanpur	Kishanpur	Bisalpur
Kishanpur	Kallia	Nyoria Husainpur
Kishanpur Haripur	Kishanpur Haripur	Puranpur
Kishanpur Kalan	Shahbajpur	Pilibhit
Kishanpur Naugawa	Shahbajpur	Pilibhit
Kishni	Kishni	Bisalpur
Kokila	Mundia Kundri Mustaqil	Bisalpur
Kokilee	Mundia Kundri Mustaqil	Bisalpur
Kon	Rampur M Kon	Puranpur
Kuan Khera	Mahof	Pilibhit
Kukra	Himmat Nager Urf Chiraidipur	Pilibhit
Kukrikhera	Kukrikhera	Pilibhit
Kulha Garha	Sabalpur Khas	Puranpur
Kundri Dahgala	Rampuria Sirsa	Pilibhit
Kunwarpur	Saidpur	Pilibhit
Kunwarpur T Anandpur	Sandai	Pilibhit
Kunwarpur T Gajraula	N/A	Puranpur
Kunwarpur T Ghunchai	Kalyanpur	Puranpur
Kuraiya Kalan	Kuraiya Kalan	Bisalpur
Kuraiya Khurd	Kuraiya Kalan	Bilsanda
Kuraiya Khurd Kalan	Kuraiya Khurd Kalan	Puranpur
Kuraiya Navadia	Kuraiya	Pilibhit
Kuraiya Talluka Phuta Kuwan	Kuraiya Talluka Phuta Kuwan	Pilibhit
Kurra Ehatmali	Bhaga Mohammadganj Mustqil	Pilibhit
Kurra Mustqil	Bhaga Mohammadganj Mustqil	Pilibhit
Kurri Ehatmali	Kurri Mustqil	Pilibhit
Kurri Mustqil	Kurri Mustqil	Pilibhit
Kusma	Barhepura T Kusma	Pilibhit
Kuthia Gudia	Kuthia Gudia	Puranpur
Kuthia Rate	Hatua Bijulahi	Pilibhit
Ladpur	Sirsa	Pilibhit
Ladpur	Ladpur	Pilibhit
Lagabhaga	Gabhia Sahrai	Pilibhit
Laha	Laha	Puranpur
Lahaur Ganj	Bilaspur	Pilibhit
Laihari	Maini Gulria	Pilibhit
Lakha Khas	Lakha Khas	Pilibhit
Lalauri Khera	Lalauri Khera	Pilibhit
Lalor Gujranpur	Lalor Gujranpur	Bisalpur
Lalpur	Lalpur	Pilibhit
Lalpur Amrit	Udaipur Khurd	Pilibhit
Lalpur T Madho Tanda	Lalpur T Madho Tanda	Pilibhit
Lalpuria Baurakh	Tanda Bijaisi Sahrai	Nyoria Husainpur
Lalpuria Saheb Singh	Lalpuriya Sahib	Pilibhit
Lamua	Lamua	Bisalpur
Laukahi	Luktiaayi	Puranpur
Laukha	Laukha	Pilibhit
Lilhar	Lilhar	Bilsanda
Lodhipur	Lodhipur	Puranpur
Lohanna	Simraya T Ghungchihai	Puranpur
Loharpura	Loharpura	Pilibhit
Loneha	N/A	Pilibhit
Lucknow Kalan	Lucknow Kalan	Bisalpur
Ludh Pura	Ladhpura	Pilibhit
Luhichha	Luhichha	Bisalpur
Lukathai	Udaikaranpur	Puranpur
Maanpur Hatua	Maanpur Hatua	Pilibhit
Maanpur Kishanpur	Tah	Pilibhit
Madarpur	Ghungchihai	Puranpur
Madhaiya	Aamdar	Pilibhit
Madhaiya Urf Ramshala	Naugawa Urf Navi Nagar	Bisalpur
Madhaupur	Madhaupur	Pilibhit
Madhkarpur	Rath	Pilibhit
Madhopur	Madhopur	Pilibhit
Madhopur Kalan T Gajraula	Dharampur Khurd	Pilibhit
Madhopur Khurd T Gajraula	N/A	Puranpur
Madhopur Khurd T Madho Tanda	Abhaipur Madhopur	Puranpur
Madhpuri	Madhpuri	Pilibhit
Madhuwa Nagri Ehatmali	Kharuwa Mustqil	Pilibhit
Madhuwa Nagri Mustqil	Kharuwa Mustqil	Pilibhit
Madhwapur	Marauri Khas	Bisalpur
Magrasa	Magrasa	Pilibhit
Mahad Khas	Mahad Khas	Pilibhit
Mahadev	N/A	Pilibhit
Mahadewa	Mahadewa	Bisalpur
Maharajpur	Maharajpur	Pilibhit
Mahawa	Khanpur Urf Birampur	Pilibhit
Mahchandi	Mahchandi	Pilibhit
Maheshpur	Bahadia	Bisalpur
Maheshpur	Rauhatania	Pilibhit
Mahewa	Haripur Kalan	Puranpur
Mahid	N/A	Puranpur
Mahof	Mahof	Pilibhit
Maholiya	Mohaliya	Bilsanda
Maholiya	Simra T Ghunchai	Pilibhit
Mahua Gunde	Mahua Gunde	Pilibhit
Mahuwa Mustqil	Mahua Chak Mustqil	Pilibhit
Mahuwa Sahrai	Mahua Chak Mustqil	Pilibhit
Maidana	Maidana	Nyoria Husainpur
Mainakot	Mainakot	Pilibhit
Maini	Naugawa Santosh	Bisalpur
Maini Gulria	Maini Gulria	Pilibhit
Mainpura	Bhainpura	Pilibhit
Maithi Saidulla Ganj	Maithi Saidulla Ganj	Nyoria Husainpur
Majhalia	Majhalia Mustqil	Jahanabad
Majhara	Surajpur Ehatmali	Majhola
Majhara Bagha	Majhara Ta Maharajpur	Pilibhit
Majhara T Ghunchai	Keshopur T Ghunchai	Puranpur
Majhara T Maharajpur	Majhara Ta Maharajpur	Pilibhit
Majhganwa	Tondarpur Mustqil	Majhola
Majhgawan	Majhgawan	Bilsanda
Makarandpur J Puranpur	Raghunathpur	Pilibhit
Makrandpur Chaugan	Narayanpur Bujurg	Pilibhit
Makrandpur Mafi	Chand Dandi	Pilibhit
Makrandpur Naka	Kuraiya Kalan	Bilsanda
Makrandpur Raushan Singh	Makrandpur Roshan Singh	Bisalpur
Makrandpur T Simroli	Amkhirya T Pagar	Bilsanda
Makrandpur Tapa	Parsadpur	Puranpur
Makranpur T Pipriya Dulai	Makranpur T Pipriya Dulai	Pilibhit
Mala	Mahua Chak Mustqil	Pilibhit
Malahpur Khajuria	Malahpur Khajuria	Pilibhit
Malakpur	N/A	Pilibhit
Malin Kuiyan	Gajraula Khas	Pilibhit
Malkapur	Baknia Dixit	Bisalpur
Mallanpur	Sukatia Jaskaranpur	Bisalpur
Mandanpur Khurd	Kesarpur Kalan	Puranpur
Mandaria	Mandaria	Pilibhit
Mandra Suman	Mandra Suman	Pilibhit
Mangadpur	Mangadpur	Pilibhit
Mangadpur	N/A	Pilibhit
Manhriya Khurd Kalan	Sherpur Makrandpur	Pilibhit
Mania	Mania	Pilibhit
Maniharia	N/A	Pilibhit
Mankapur	Mankapur	Pilibhit
Manpur	Lalpur	Pilibhit
Manpur Bisalpur	Manpur Bisalpur	Pilibhit
Manpur Jalalpur	Mania	Bisalpur
Manpur Marori	Manpur Marori	Pilibhit
Manpur T Madho Tanda	Shahgarh	Pilibhit
Manpur Tilhar	Gabhia Sahrai	Pilibhit
Manpura	N/A	Bisalpur
Maqtul	Maqtul	Pilibhit
Mar	Mar	Bilsanda
Marauri Khas	Marauri Khas	Pilibhit
Marha Khurd Kalan	Marha Khurd Kalan	Puranpur
Marori Mustqil	Marori Mustqil	Pilibhit
Marori Sahraee	Marori Mustqil	Pilibhit
Maseet	Maseet	Pilibhit
Mataina	Gulenda Gautia	Pilibhit
Mataiya Lalpur	Mataiya Lalpur	Pilibhit
Matena T Ghungchihai	N/A	Puranpur
Mathna Jabti	Mathna Jabti	Pilibhit
Mathu Dandi Ehatmali	Mathu Dandi Mustqil	Pilibhit
Mathu Dandi Mustqil	Mathu Dandi Mustqil	Pilibhit
Mati Mafi	Mahadev Mati	Pilibhit
Mawaiya	Mawaiya	Pilibhit
Meerapur Ehatmali	Siya Bari Patti	Pilibhit
Meerapur Mustqil	Siya Bari Patti	Pilibhit
Meerpur	Gauhania Marori	Pilibhit
Meerpur Girand	Meerpur Girand	Pilibhit
Meghpur	Dilawarpur	Puranpur
Mewatpura Urf Sherganj	Maithi Saidulla Ganj	Nyoria Husainpur
Mighai	Ladpur	Pilibhit
Mighauna	Mighauna	Pilibhit
Milak Gautia	Amrita Khas	Bisalpur
Mintarpur	Sidhaura Bindhuwa	Pilibhit
Mirapur	Meerapur Mustqil	Pilibhit
Mirpur Bahanpur	Mirpur Bahanpur	Pilibhit
Mirpur Dhakriya	Firsa Churra	Pilibhit
Mirpur Hamupura	Mirpur Hamupura	Pilibhit
Mirpur Harraipur	Mirpur Harraipur	Bisalpur
Mirpur Hirpur	Rampur Basant	Bisalpur
Mirpur Ratanpur	Jamunia Mahua	Bisalpur
Mirpur Udel	Painiya Himmat	Pilibhit
Mitepur	Parewa Ta Kisni	Pilibhit
Mitnapur	N/A	Pilibhit
Mitrasenpur	Simria Tarachandra	Pilibhit
Mohammadganj Amkharia	Nawada Mahesh	Bisalpur
Mohammadganj Rampura	Khajuria Panchpera	Bisalpur
Mohammadganj Urf Peeratal	Himmat Nager Urf Chiraidipur	Pilibhit
Mohammadpur Bhaja	Mohammadpur Bhaja	Pilibhit
Mohammadpur J Bhaipur	Pipria Jaibhadra	Pilibhit
Mohammadpur J Kulhagarha	Banjaria	Puranpur
Mohammadpur T Kareli	Kalyanpur T Kareli	Bilsanda
Mohammadpur T Kishanpur	Ilahbaasdewal	Pilibhit
Mohammadpur T Rampur Amrit	Bakainia T Rampur Amrit	Bilsanda
Mohanpur	Udara	Gularia Bhindara
Mohanpur Jabti	Mohanpur Jabti	Pilibhit
Mohanpur T Ghunchai	N/A	Puranpur
Mohanpur T Madho Tanda	Devipur	Pilibhit
Mohbbatpur	Narainpur Ghunchai	Pilibhit
Mohof Forest	N/A	Pilibhit
Mosepur Kalan	Mosepur Kalan	Pilibhit
Mud Gawan	Mudigawan	Pilibhit
Muda Semnagar Urf Pandri	Muda Semnagar Urf Pandri	Pilibhit
Mudalia Ilahi Baksh	Tumria	Pilibhit
Mudia Ramkishan	Igdhara	Pilibhit
Mudia Ratanpuri	Mudiya Ratanpuri	Pilibhit
Mudlia Gausu	Mudlia Gausu	Pilibhit
Mudsena Bakshpur	Mudsena Baksh	Pilibhit
Mudsena Madari	Mudsena Madari	Jahanabad
Mugla Khera	Mugla Khera	Jahanabad
Mujaffar Nagar	Mujaffar Nagar	Puranpur
Mujha Kalan	Raghunathpur	Puranpur
Mujha Khurd	Mujha Khurd	Pilibhit
Mundela Kalan Mustqil	Mundela Kalan Mustqil	Pilibhit
Mundela Kalan Saharai	Mundela Kalan Mustqil	Pilibhit
Mundela Khurd Mustqil	Mundela Kalan Mustqil	Pilibhit
Mundela Khurd Saharai	Mundela Kalan Mustqil	Pilibhit
Mundia Bhagawantpur	Bhgautipur	Bisalpur
Mundia Bilhara	Mundia Bilhara	Bilsanda
Mundia Hulas	Mundia Hulas	Pilibhit
Mundia J Pirria Dulai	Makranpur T Pipriya Dulai	Pilibhit
Mundia Karor	Mandra Suman	Bisalpur
Mundia Kundri Ehatmali	N/A	Pilibhit
Mundia Kundri Mustaqil	Mundia Kundri Mustaqil	Pilibhit
Mundia T Pasgawan	Mundia T Pasgawan	Pilibhit
Muradpur	Muradpur Mati	Puranpur
Muraina	Muraina	Pilibhit
Murainia Gandhi Nagar	N/A	Puranpur
Murlo Khera	Bilandpur Ashok	Puranpur
Musaili Mustqil	Musaili Mustqil	Pilibhit
Musakoni	Katmata	Gularia Bhindara
Musali Ehat	Musaili Mustqil	Bisalpur
Musepur	Maini Gulria	Pilibhit
Musepur Jaisingh	Museypur Jay Singh	Pilibhit
Musepur Khurd	Mosepur Kalan	Pilibhit
Musraha	Musraha	Pilibhit
Mustafabad	Mainakot	Pilibhit
Nachan	Navadia Durjanpur	Puranpur
Nachni Ghat	Nadha T Madho Tanda	Pilibhit
Nad	Naand	Bilsanda
Nadha T Gajraula	Rampur M Kon	Puranpur
Nadha T Madho Tanda	Nadha T Madho Tanda	Pilibhit
Nagariya Tilagiri	Nagariya Tulagiri	Bilsanda
Nagfan Rasoiya	Kanja Haraia	Pilibhit
Nagipur Akhola	Nagipur Akhola	Pilibhit
Nagra Fiza	Nagra Fiza	Bisalpur
Nagra Rata	Nagra Rata	Bisalpur
Nagra Ta Musepur	Agyari	Pilibhit
Nagria	Nagria Mustqil	Pilibhit
Nagria Fatehpur Ehat	N/A	Bisalpur
Nagria Fatehpur Must	Nagria Fatehpur Must	Bisalpur
Nagria Khurd Kalan	Nagria Khurd Kalan	Pilibhit
Nahua	N/A	Pilibhit
Nakatia	Nakatiya	Pilibhit
Nakta Urf Muradabad	Galra Machwapur	Pilibhit
Nand Pasiapur	Nand Pasiapur	Lalauri Khera
Nand Simaria	Dandia Bhasaudi	Pilibhit
Nara Soha	Baijunagar	Puranpur
Narainpur Govindpur	Chatipur	Puranpur
Narainpur J Puranpur	Narainpur Ja Puranpur	Puranpur
Naraur	Rampur T Mahrajpur	Puranpur
Narayan Dher	Narayan Dher	Pilibhit
Narayanpur	Narayanpur	Pilibhit
Narayanpur Bujurg	Narayanpur Bujurg	Pilibhit
Narayanpur T Ghunchai	Narainpur Ghunchai	Pilibhit
Nasrullahpur	Hafiznagar Banhai	Bisalpur
Naugawa Santosh	Naugawa Santosh	Bisalpur
Naugawa Urf Navi Nagar	Naugawa Urf Navi Nagar	Pilibhit
Naugawan Ambar	Naugwan Amber	Pilibhit
Naugawan M Mujaffar Nagar	Jadaupur	Puranpur
Naugawan T Chandpur	Navadia Durjanpur	Pilibhit
Naugma M Mohammadpur	Banjaria	Puranpur
Naujalha Naktaha	Naujalha Naktaha	Pilibhit
Naurangabad	Tanda Gulabrai	Pilibhit
Navada Kadhaiya	Bindua	Jahanabad
Navada Kishandas	Khundara	Pilibhit
Navada Shyampur	Navada Shyampur	Pilibhit
Navadia Dahla	Nabadiya Dahla	Pilibhit
Navadia Durjanpur	N/A	Pilibhit
Navadia J Sabalpur Khas	Sabalpur Khas	Puranpur
Navadia Jithnia	Tirkunia Nasir	Pilibhit
Navadia Kuraiya	Banausa	Pilibhit
Navadia Lachhan	Marha Khurd Kalan	Pilibhit
Navadia M Mujaffar Nagar	Mujaffar Nagar	Puranpur
Navadia Nadi Kinara Jukna	Haripur Kalan	Puranpur
Navadia Sharifganj Ahatmali	Mathu Dandi Mustqil	Pilibhit
Navadia Sharifganj Mustqil	Mathu Dandi Mustqil	Pilibhit
Navadia Todarpur	Haripur M Phulhar	Pilibhit
Navdia Dhanesh	Navdia Dhanesh	Pilibhit
Navdia Gheesi	Khag	Pilibhit
Navdia M Shivnagar	Shiv Nagar	Puranpur
Navdia Maksudpur	Rampur Fakire	Pilibhit
Navdia Must Tanda Chhatrapati	Pata Bojhi	Pilibhit
Navdia Sultanpur	Udaikaranpur	Pilibhit
Nawada Das	Nawada Daas	Pilibhit
Nawada Kanja	Nawada Kanja	Jahanabad
Nawada Khushali	Dhakia Natha	Pilibhit
Nawada Mahesh	Nawada Mahesh	Pilibhit
Nawadia Baljeet	Khandepur	Bisalpur
Nawadia Bhagat	Mohammadpur Bhaja	Pilibhit
Nawadia Munjapta Kalan	Pazawa	Pilibhit
Nawadia Visem	Nawada Daas	Pilibhit
Nawadyia Marouri	Nabadiya Marori	Bilsanda
Nawajpur T Chandpur	Mahadev Mati	Pilibhit
Nawkoond Ehatmali	Nawkoond Mustqil	Pilibhit
Nawkoond Mustqil	Nawkoond Mustqil	Pilibhit
Nehrosa	Nehrosa	Puranpur
Nihalpur	Niwar Aithpur Mustqil	Pilibhit
Nirottam Nagla	Sukatia Jaskaranpur	Pilibhit
Nisawa Nisaiya	Nisawa Nisaiya	Sitarganj
Nisra	Nisra	Pilibhit
Niwa Dandi	Sukatia Jaskaranpur	Bisalpur
Niwar Aithpur	Niwar Aithpur Mustqil	Pilibhit
Nizam Dandi	Nizam Dandi	Jahanabad
Nizampur Urf Lah	Nizampur Urf Lah	Pilibhit
Noorpur	Noorpur	Pilibhit
Nua Nagla	Nauya Nagla	Pilibhit
Nuranpur	Nuranpur	Pilibhit
Nyoria Husainpur	Nyoria Husainpur	Pilibhit
Nyoria	Malahpur Khajuria	Pilibhit
Nyoria Husainpur Khurd	Nyoria Husainpur Khurd	Nyoria Husainpur
Nyoria Husainpur Must	Neoriya Hussainpur Da Mu	Pilibhit
Nyoria Husainpur Sahrai	Nyoria Husainpur	Pilibhit
Nyoria Husainpur Sumali Sahra	Neoriya Hussainpur Uttar Mu	Pilibhit
Ora Jhar	Ora Jhar	Pilibhit
Orha Jhar	Mathna Jabti	Pilibhit
Pachpera Garha	Nadha T Madho Tanda	Pilibhit
Pachpera Prahladpur	Udaikaranpur	Pilibhit
Pachpera T Maharajpur	Simra T Maharajpur	Pilibhit
Pachpera Talluka Shahpura	Pachpera Talluka Shahpura	Bisalpur
Pachperakhurd M Ranpurfakire	Sabalpur M Rampur Fakire	Pilibhit
Pachtaur	Dinarpur	Jahanabad
Pachtor Kuian	Pachtor Kuian	Bisalpur
Paharganj	Paharganj	Pilibhit
Painiya Himmat	Painiya Himmat	Pilibhit
Painiya Ramkishan	Painiya Ramkishan	Pilibhit
Paint Bojhi	Paintbhojhi	Bisalpur
Pakaria Vijaypur	Bhindara	Pilibhit
Pakria Bindhua	Sangawan	Bisalpur
Pakria Mangli	Pakria Mangli	Pilibhit
Pakria Naugwan Ehatmali	Pakriya Naugwan Mustqil	Pilibhit
Pakria T Deoria	Pakria T Deoria	Duforiya Kalan
Pakria T Umraiya	Pakariya T Amariya	Pilibhit
Pakriya Naugwan Mustqil	Pakriya Naugwan Mustqil	Pilibhit
Palia	Dhuria Paliya	Pilibhit
Paliya Mafi	Bakainia Talluka Mahad	Pilibhit
Panchpera Purna	Panchpera Purna	Pilibhit
Pandara Kishandas	Katmata	Majhola
Pandara Ramdas	Katmata	Pilibhit
Pandari	Pandari	Pilibhit
Pandra Urf Devipur	Baijunagar	Puranpur
Pandri	Ghungchihai	Pilibhit
Pandri Katala	Birhani	Gularia Bhindara
Pandri Khamria	Pandri Khamria	Pilibhit
Pandri Marauri	Pandri Marauri	Bilsanda
Pandria	Pandria	Puranpur
Panjaba	Sherpur Kalan	Puranpur
Pansoli Ehatmali	Pansoli Mustqil	Pilibhit
Pansoli Mustqil	Pansoli Mustqil	Pilibhit
Parai	Parai	Pilibhit
Parasi Urf Parasia	Parasi Urf Parasia	Bisalpur
Parasiram Kishan	Parasiram Kishan	Bisalpur
Parasrampur	Madho Tanda	Pilibhit
Parewa Anup	Parewa Anup	Bisalpur
Parewa T Kishni	Parewa Ta Kisni	Pilibhit
Parewa Turrha	Parewa Turrha	Bisalpur
Parewa Vaishya	Parewa Vaishya	Pilibhit
Parsadpur	Parsadpur	Puranpur
Parsandi	Parsaandi	Pilibhit
Pasgawan	Pasgawan	Bilsanda
Pasiyapur	Rath	Bisalpur
Pata Bojhi	Pata Bojhi	Pilibhit
Patia Khurd	N/A	Pilibhit
Patihan	Patihan	Puranpur
Patljia	Sindhaura Kharagpur	Bilsanda
Patniya	Patniya	Bisalpur
Patrasa Kunwarpur	Patrasa Kunwarpur	Pilibhit
Patrasia	Patrasia	Bisalpur
Paur Khas	Shahgarh	Pilibhit
Pauta	Kargaina Peera	Jahanabad
Pauta Kalan	Pauta Kalan	Pilibhit
Pauta Khurd	Tah	Pilibhit
Pazawa	Pazawa	Pilibhit
Phirsah Churrah	Firsa Churra	Pilibhit
Phulaiya	Fulaieya	Jahanabad
Phulhar	Phulhar	Nyoria Husainpur
Phulhar	N/A	Pilibhit
Phuta Kuwan	Kuraiya Talluka Phuta Kuwan	Pilibhit
Pilibhit Ehatmali	N/A	Pilibhit
Pilibhit Kohna	Dioni Kesharpur	Pilibhit
Pinjra Vamanpuri	Pinjra Vamanpuri	Pilibhit
Pipar Gehna	Pipar Gehna	Pilibhit
Piparia Bhaja	Piparia Bhaja	Pilibhit
Piparia Majhara	Piparia Majhara	Puranpur
Piparia T Chandpur	Kesarpur Kalan	Puranpur
Pipra Bale	Pipra Bale	Pilibhit
Pipra Bhagu	Pipra Bale	Pilibhit
Pipra Khas	Pipra Khas	Pilibhit
Pipra Munjapta	Pipra Munjapta	Pilibhit
Pipria Agru	Pipria Agru	Pilibhit
Pipria Darod Giran	Pipria Jaibhadra	Puranpur
Pipria Jaibhadra	Pipria Jaibhadra	Puranpur
Pipria Karam	Pipria Karam	Pilibhit
Pipria Lala	Bilhari	Puranpur
Pipria Mandan	Pipria Mandan	Pilibhit
Pipria Navdia	Pipariya Navadiya	Pilibhit
Pipria Santosh	Pipria Santosh	Pilibhit
Pipria Shanjarpur	Pipariya Sanjarpur	Pilibhit
Pipria Singhipur	Pipria Singhipur	Pilibhit
Pipria T Pagar	Amkhirya T Pagar	Pilibhit
Pipriya Dulai	Pipriya Dulai	Puranpur
Pooranpur Kurraiya	Tanda	Puranpur
Prahladpur M Kalinagar	Sukhdaspur Navadia	Pilibhit
Pratap Dandi	Lucknow Kalan	Pilibhit
Pratap Pur	Pratappur	Pilibhit
Prithipur	Prithipur	Bisalpur
Puraina	Puraina	Bisalpur
Puraina	Jahanabad Dehat	Jahanabad
Puraina Mafi	Ruriya	Pilibhit
Puraina T Madhau Tanda	Chandopur	Pilibhit
Puraina T Maharajpur	Puraina T Maharajpur	Pilibhit
Puraini Deepnagar	Mathna Jabti	Pilibhit
Purainia Ramgulam	Purainia Ramgulam	Pilibhit
Puranpur Khas	Puranpur Dehat	Puranpur
Purnapur	Khundara	Pilibhit
Purnapur	Puraina	Pilibhit
Purva Bhooda Sahraee	Purawa Bhooda Mu	Pilibhit
Purwa Bhooda Mustqil	Purawa Bhooda Mu	Pilibhit
Pyas	Pyaas	Pilibhit
Qabulpur	Qabulpur	Pilibhit
Radheta Ehat	Radheta Must	Pilibhit
Radheta Must	Radheta Must	Pilibhit
Rafiapur	Rafiapur	Pilibhit
Raghunathpur	Raghunathpur	Pilibhit
Raghunathpur J Sikrahna	Sundarpur	Pilibhit
Rai Nagla	Jeohra Kalyanpur	Pilibhit
Raipur	Raipur	Pilibhit
Raipur Bichpur	Raipur Bichpuri	Pilibhit
Raipur Ehatmali	Raipur Mustqil	Pilibhit
Raipur J Gulria	Pipria Jaibhadra	Puranpur
Raipur M Rampur	Abhaipur M Shahgarh	Pilibhit
Raipur Mustqil	Raipur Mustqil	Pilibhit
Rajpur Kandari	Rajpur Kandari	Pilibhit
Rajpur T Madhau Tanda	Narayanpur Bujurg	Pilibhit
Rajpur T Maharajpur	Raajpur Ta Maharajpur	Pilibhit
Ram Nagar	Gularia Bhoopsingh	Pilibhit
Ramapur	Gajraula	Pilibhit
Rambojha	Rambojha	Bisalpur
Ramkot	Simra T Maharajpur	Pilibhit
Ramnagar	Tandola	Pilibhit
Ramnagar Jagatpur	Ramnagar Jagatpur	Pilibhit
Ramnagar Ta Chandpur	Jograjpur	Puranpur
Ramnagra	Ramnagra	Pilibhit
Rampur Amrit	Rampur Amrit	Bilsanda
Rampur Basant	Rampur Basant	Pilibhit
Rampur Baurakh	Tanda Bijaisi Sahrai	Pilibhit
Rampur Fakire	Rampur Fakire	Puranpur
Rampur M Bhavsi	Baijunagar	Pilibhit
Rampur M Kon	Rampur M Kon	Pilibhit
Rampur M Raipur	Bangla Urf Mitrasen	Pilibhit
Rampur Munjapta	Garha Kalan	Pilibhit
Rampur T Ghunchai	Simra T Ghunchai	Puranpur
Rampur T Mahrajpur	Rampur T Mahrajpur	Puranpur
Rampur T Majhara	Piparia Majhara	Puranpur
Rampur T Sultanpur	Sultanpur	Pilibhit
Rampura	Mudiya Ratanpuri	Pilibhit
Rampura Mishra	Rampura Mishra	Jahanabad
Rampura Natthu	Rampura Natthu	Pilibhit
Rampura Naugawan	Nagria Fatehpur Must	Pilibhit
Rampura Rama	Khandepur	Pilibhit
Rampura Rampuria	Ajeetpur Vilah	Puranpur
Rampura Ujhainia Ehatmali	Ramura Ujhaniya Mu	Jahanabad
Rampura Ujhainia Mustqil	Ramura Ujhaniya Mu	Jahanabad
Rampuria Biran	Daga	Pilibhit
Rampuria Mahof	Chura Khera	Pilibhit
Rampuria Sirsa	Rampuria Sirsa	Pilibhit
Rana Pratap Nagar	Rana Pratap Nagar	Puranpur
Ranmustpur J Balrampur	Balrampur J Ranmustpur	Puranpur
Raria T Gajraula	Kadher Chaura T Gajraula	Puranpur
Rasiakhanpur	Rasiakhanpur	Bisalpur
Rasoolpur	Sabalpur Khas	Puranpur
Rasula	Tirkunia Nasir	Pilibhit
Rasula Ehatmali	Rasula Mustkil	Pilibhit
Rasula Mustkil	Rasula Mustkil	Pilibhit
Rasulpur Muzpata	Mahadev Mati	Pilibhit
Rasulpur Pachpukhra	N/A	Puranpur
Rath	Rath	Pilibhit
Rauhatania	Rauhatania	Pilibhit
Richhaula Sawal	Richhaula Sawal	Pilibhit
Richhaulia	Richhaula Sawal	Bisalpur
Richhola Ghasi Ehat	Richhola Ghasi Must	Pilibhit
Richhola Ghasi Must	Richhola Ghasi Must	Bisalpur
Richhola Mustqil	Richola Mu	Pilibhit
Richhola Sahrai	Richola Mu	Pilibhit
Rohania	Rohania	Pilibhit
Roop Pur Kamalu	Roop Pur Kamalu	Pilibhit
Roop Pur Kripa	Roop Pur Kripa	Pilibhit
Rotapur	Rotapur	Pilibhit
Rudrapur	Abhaipur J Jagatpur	Puranpur
Rujha	Sapah	Pilibhit
Rura Ramnagar	Rura Ramnagar	Pilibhit
Ruria Ghuriya	Ruria Ghuriya	Bilsanda
Ruria Salempur	Ruriya Salempur	Pilibhit
Ruriya	Ruriya	Bisalpur
Sabalpur Khas	Sabalpur Khas	Puranpur
Sabalpur M Rampur Fakire	Sabalpur M Rampur Fakire	Pilibhit
Sabalpur M Tanda Gulabrai	Narayanpur Bujurg	Pilibhit
Sabalpur Mustqil Jamunia	Aspur	Pilibhit
Sabeypur	Sabeypur	Bisalpur
Saddarpur	Saddarpur	Gularia Bhindara
Sadia Ladpur	Tehri	Bisalpur
Safaura	Safaura	Pilibhit
Sahgawan Nagria	Sahgawan Nagria	Pilibhit
Saidpur	Saidpur	Pilibhit
Saijani Bankati	Maithi Saidulla Ganj	Nyoria Husainpur
Saijna Ehatmali	Saijna Mustqil	Pilibhit
Saijna Mustqil	N/A	Pilibhit
Saijna Sahraee	N/A	Pilibhit
Sakatpur	Kanakore	Jahanabad
Sakatpur T Chandpur	Jograjpur	Pilibhit
Sakhaula	Sakhaula	Pilibhit
Sakhiya	Gajraula	Pilibhit
Samar Khera	Semar Khera	Jahanabad
Sampurnanagar Range	N/A	Puranpur
Sand Deo	Kalyanpur T Kareli	Bilsanda
Sanda	Sanda	Pilibhit
Sandai	Sandai	Pilibhit
Sandia Ehatmali	Sandia Mustqil	Pilibhit
Sandia Mugalpura	Sadiya Mugal Pura	Nyoria Husainpur
Sandia Mustqil	Sandia Mustqil	Pilibhit
Sangawan	Sangawan	Pilibhit
Santoshpur	Pipria Santosh	Pilibhit
Santoshpura	Santoshpura	Pilibhit
Sapaha	Sapah	Puranpur
Sapha	Sapaha	Pilibhit
Sarai Sundarpur	Sarai Sundarpur	Pilibhit
Sarai Urf Saraiya	Pandri Marauri	Bilsanda
Sarainda Patti	Sarainda Patti	Amaria
Saraini Turkunia	Saraini Turkunia	Pilibhit
Saraura	Saraura	Pilibhit
Sarauri	Sarauri	Pilibhit
Sardar Nagar	Sardar Nagar	Pilibhit
Sathrapur Ehatmali	Sathrapur Mu	Pilibhit
Sathrapur Mustqil	Sathrapur Mu	Pilibhit
Satipur	Shahbajpur	Puranpur
Sayar	Sayar	Pilibhit
Sehramau Uttari	Seharmau Uttari	Pilibhit
Sekhpur	Jagipur Jaitpur	Bisalpur
Selha	Selha	Pilibhit
Shahbajpur	Shahbajpur	Puranpur
Shahbajpur Ehat	N/A	Pilibhit
Shahbajpur Must	Radheta Must	Bisalpur
Shahee	Shahee	Jahanabad
Shahgarh	Shahgarh	Pilibhit
Shahpura	Shahpura	Pilibhit
Shaleh Nagar	Kalyanpur	Puranpur
Shampur	Malakpur	Bisalpur
Shanti Nagar	Shantinagar	Puranpur
Sharifganj	Amarganj Mustqil	Pilibhit
Shastri Nagar	Shastri Nagar	Puranpur
Shayampur Mustqil	Aspur	Jahanabad
Shekhupur	Dudhia Khurd	Pilibhit
Sherganj Dharmangadpur	Sherganj Dharmangadpur	Pilibhit
Sherganj Khurd	Bakainia Talluka Mahad	Bisalpur
Sherpur Kalan	Sherpur Kalan	Pilibhit
Sherpur Makrandpur	Sherpur Makrandpur	Puranpur
Shikarpur	Sherpur Kalan	Pilibhit
Shimbhua	Sundarpur	Puranpur
Shiv Nagar	Shiv Nagar	Pilibhit
Shivpur Nawadia	Shivpur Nawadia	Pilibhit
Shivpuria	Shivpuria	Pilibhit
Shree Nagar	Shree Nagar	Puranpur
Shyampur	Haripur T Chandpur	Pilibhit
Shyampur Ehatmali	Aspur	Jahanabad
Siddhnagar	Siddhnagar	Puranpur
Sidhaura Bindhuwa	Sidhaura Bindhuwa	Pilibhit
Sikandarpur J Kuluhagarha	Sabalpur Khas	Puranpur
Sikrahna	Sikrahani	Pilibhit
Simar Inchharam	Mosepur Kalan	Pilibhit
Simra Jagir	Simria Tarachandra	Pilibhit
Simra Mahipat	Nagariya Tulagiri	Bilsanda
Simra T Ghunchai	Simra T Ghunchai	Puranpur
Simra T Maharajpur	Simra T Maharajpur	Pilibhit
Simraiya J Kulhagarha	Parsadpur	Puranpur
Simrauli	Simrauli	Bilsanda
Simraya T Ghungchihai	Simraya T Ghungchihai	Puranpur
Simria Anoop	Dahgala	Pilibhit
Simria Gausu	Simariya Gaisu	Pilibhit
Simria T Maharajpur	Simria T Maharajpur	Pilibhit
Simria Tarachandra	Simria Tarachandra	Pilibhit
Simriya T Ajitpur Bilha	Simriya T Ajitpur Bilha	Pilibhit
Sinbua	Sinbua	Bilsanda
Sinbuapur	Muraina	Bilsanda
Sindhaura Kharagpur	Sindhaura Kharagpur	Bilsanda
Singhara Urf Tatarganj	Singhara Urf Tatarganj	Puranpur
Singhpurta Chandpur	Fatepur Khurd	Pilibhit
Singipur	Rath	Pilibhit
Sirsa	Sirsa	Pilibhit
Sirsa	Sirsa	Sitarganj
Sirsa Sardah Mustqil	Sirsa Sardah Mustqil	Pilibhit
Sirsa Sardah Sahrai	Sirsa Sardah Mustqil	Pilibhit
Sisaiya	Sisaiya	Pilibhit
Sisaiya	Sisaiya	Pilibhit
Sisaiya Jalalpur	Malakpur	Pilibhit
Sisiya Sahab	Sisaiya Sahab	Pilibhit
Sitalpur Marauri	Ora Jhar	Bilsanda
Sitalpur Qazi	Hafiznagar Banhai	Pilibhit
Sitarganj Navdia Ehat	Sitarganj Navdia Must	Bisalpur
Sitarganj Navdia Must	Sitarganj Navdia Must	Pilibhit
Siya Bari Patti	Siya Bari Patti	Pilibhit
Sohanna	Simraya T Ghungchihai	Pilibhit
Sondha	Sondha	Pilibhit
Sondha	Sondha	Pilibhit
Sondhia	Gajheri	Bisalpur
Sonupura	Chandopur	Pilibhit
Soraha	Richhola Ghasi Must	Pilibhit
Suabojh	Suabojh	Puranpur
Suhas	Suhas	Pilibhit
Suhela	Int Gaon	Bisalpur
Sujanpur	Abhaipur J Jagatpur	Puranpur
Sujnee	Sujnee	Bisalpur
Sukatia Jaskaranpur	Sukatia Jaskaranpur	Pilibhit
Sukhdaspur	Takia Dinarpur	Puranpur
Sukhdaspur Navadia	Sukhdaspur Navadia	Pilibhit
Suktia	Suktia	Jahanabad
Sultanpur	Sultanpur	Puranpur
Sundarpur	Sundarpur	Puranpur
Sunderpur	Sunderpur	Pilibhit
Sunderpur	N/A	Pilibhit
Sungarhi	Dhuria Paliya	Pilibhit
Surajpur	Surajpur Ehatmali	Majhola
Surajpur Ehatmali	Surajpur Ehatmali	Majhola
Surajpur Urf Shivnagar	Gaunera	Pilibhit
Suswar Ehatmali	Suswar	Pilibhit
Suswar Mustqil	Suswar	Pilibhit
Swami Navada	Daulatpur Patti	Bisalpur
Tah	Tah	Pilibhit
Tajpur	Dhakia Jalalpur	Bilsanda
Takia	Kainch	Pilibhit
Takia Dinarpur	Takia Dinarpur	Puranpur
Tanda	Tanda	Puranpur
Tanda Bijaisi	Tanda Bijaisi Sahrai	Nyoria Husainpur
Tanda Bijaisi Sahrai	Tanda Bijaisi Sahrai	Nyoria Husainpur
Tanda Chhatrapati	Tanda Chhatrapati	Pilibhit
Tanda Gulabrai	Tanda Gulabrai	Pilibhit
Tanda Madiau	N/A	Pilibhit
Tanda Surat	Daga	Pilibhit
Tandola	Kurri Mustqil	Pilibhit
Tandola	Tandola	Pilibhit
Tapa Viran	Amkhidiya	Pilibhit
Tar Kunia Nasir	Tirkunia Nasir	Jahanabad
Tehri	Tehri	Pilibhit
Terha Lekhraj	Dandia Bhagat	Pilibhit
Terha Shriram	Terha Shriram	Pilibhit
Tharwan	Shahbajpur	Puranpur
Tihuliya	Lalor Gujranpur	Pilibhit
Tikri Mafi	Tikri Mafi	Bisalpur
Tilchhi	Tilchhi	Bilsanda
Tilsanda Hansua	Tilsanda Hasua	Bilsanda
Tondarpur	Tondarpur Mustqil	Majhola
Tukra Jangal	Suabojh	Puranpur
Tulapur	Kuraiya Kalan	Bilsanda
Tulapur	Kadher Chaura T Gajraula	Puranpur
Tulsipur	Khiri Naubaramad	Pilibhit
Tumria	Tumria	Pilibhit
Turkpur Urf Barhwar	Turkpur Urf Barhwar Mustqil	Nyoria Husainpur
Turrha	Ghung Chaiya	Bisalpur
Uchsiya	Khanpur Urf Birampur	Bisalpur
Udaikaranpur	Udaikaranpur	Pilibhit
Udaipur Kalan	Udaipur Khurd	Puranpur
Udaipur Khurd	Udaipur Khurd	Puranpur
Udara	Udara	Pilibhit
Udaraha	Rambojha	Bisalpur
Udaypur Mafi	Udaypur	Jahanabad
Udraha	Ghungchihai	Puranpur
Uganpur	Uganpur	Pilibhit
Uganpur	Madho Tanda	Pilibhit
Uganpur Bisalpur	Uganpur Bisalpur	Bisalpur
Uganpur Marori	Uganpur Marori	Bisalpur
Ujhainia Rampur Mustqil	Ujhainia Rampur Mustqil	Barkhera
Ujhainia Rampura Ehatmali	Ujhainia Rampur Mustqil	Pilibhit
Ulkari Dhakia	Ulkari Dhakia	Gularia Bhindara
Ullika	Hafiznagar Banhai	Bisalpur
Umarsar Ehatmali	Umarsar Mustqil	Kharkhera
Umarsar Mustqil	Umarsar Mustqil	Barkhera
Umra Khan Singh	Umarkhan Singh	Bisalpur
Umraia	Umraia	Pilibhit
Usmanpur	Biharipur J Itauria	Pilibhit
Vahanpur	Vahanpur	Pilibhit
Vasthana	Vasthana	Pilibhit
Vedkhera	Manpur Marori	Pilibhit
Vijai Nagar	Vijai Nagar	Puranpur
Vikrampur	Vikrampur	Pilibhit
Visem	Visain	Jahanabad

== Pilibhit District ==
Township

- Amaria
- Barkhera
- Bisalpur
- Gularia Bhindara
- Jahanabad
- Kalinagar
- Madhotanda
- Majhola
- Nyoria Husainpur
- Puranpur
