= Bisalpur, Pilibhit =

- City
- Bisalpur
- Location in Uttar Pradesh, India
- Coordinates: 28.3°N 79.8°E
- Country: India
- District: Pilibhit
- Established: 1865

Government
  - Body: Government of Uttar Pradesh
  - MLA: Vivek Kumar Verma
- Elevation: 156 m (512 ft)

Population (2011)
  - Total: 73,551
  - Density: 2,365.11/km^{2} (6,125.6/sq mi)

Languages
  - Official: Hindi
- Time zone: UTC+5:30 (IST)
- Postal code: 262201
- Vehicle registration: UP26
- Website: https://www.nppbisalpur.in/

Bisalpur is a city and a municipal board situated in the Pilibhit district of the state of Uttar Pradesh, India. The town is known for its sugar factory as well as its annual Ram Leela and Dushera festivals. Bisalpur is in between the two rivers, the West Doha River and the East Katna River. Before the formation of the new District Pilibhit, Bisalpur was under the District Bareilly. In 1913, after the formation of the new District Pilibhit, Bisalpur came under District Pilibhit Administration. this city is well connected with three major cities (Bareilly, Pilibhit, and Shahjahanpur). Bisalpur is just 290 km away from the National capital New Delhi and 250 km from the state capital Lucknow. Bisalpur is famous for Annual Ramleela Fest, Dubey Taalab, Guleshwarnath Temple, Dargah Hazrat Gazi kamaal Degree college, and Nagaich Market. Bisalpur is known for many things and places and the people of Bisalpur have contributed in various fields.

Nearby Bisalpur, there is the village Manpur, which is becoming a commercial place.

== Location ==
Bisalpur is located at coordinates, 28.3°N 79.8°E. It has an average elevation of 156 metres (512 ft). The distance between Bisalpur and Bareilly is 43 km (27 mi) and Bisalpur to Pilibhit city is 38 km (24 mi).

Bisalpur is connected to Pilibhit city and Shahjahanpur through State Highway 29. The Pilibhit Junction railway station also connects these cities on the Bareilly–Lakhimpur line, under the administration of the North Eastern Railways. There are express trains to Lucknow. Bisalpur is located at the junction of NH 731K with NH 730B and NH 730C.

== Features ==
Agriculture is well-developed in the Bisalpur area. Cultivated crops in Bisalpur Tehsil include wheat, rice, and sugarcane.

Bisalpur is currently the largest Assembly seat of Pilibhit. Bisalpur is known for its annual Ram Leela Dushera festival and the Gulashwar Nath Temple said to be made by Kunti in Mahabharat Kal.

Bara Patthar Chouraha is a historical place in Bisalpur, visited by Tatya Tope during the Indian Rebellion of 1857.

== Demographics ==
As per the Census India 2011, Bisalpur city has a population of 73,551. Males constituted 54% of the population and females 46%. Bisalpur had an average literacy rate of 61.65%, lower than the state average of 67.68% – male literacy was 68.96% and female literacy was 53.43%. 13.93% of the population was under 6 years of age. The main colonies in the town include Patel Nagar, Durga Prasad Colony, Ram Nagar Colony, Mohalla Dubey, Mohalla Gyaspur, Mohalla Bakhtavar Lal, Station Road Colony, and Idgha Chaurha.

== See also ==
- Barkhera
- Bilsanda
- Gularia Bhindara
- Jahanabad
- Kalinagar
