= National Highway 731K (India) =

National Highway in India

National Highway 731K

Route information
- Auxiliary route of NH 31
- Length: 109 km (68 mi)

Major junctions
- South end: Shahjahanpur
- North end: Khatima

Location
- Country: India
- States: Uttar Pradesh, Uttarakhand

Highway system
- Roads in India; Expressways; National; State; Asian
← NH 731	→ NH 9

National Highway 731K, commonly referred to as NH 731K is a national highway in India. It is a secondary route of National Highway 31. NH-731K runs in the states of Uttar Pradesh and Uttarakhand in India.

== Route ==
NH731K connects Shahjahanpur, Bisalpur, Barkhera, Pilibhit, Neoria Husainpur, Majhola, Chanda, Mundeli and Khatima in the states of Uttar Pradesh and Uttarakhand.

== Junctions ==
NH 731 Terminal near Shahjahanpur.
NH 730B near Bisalpur
NH 730 near Pilibhit.
NH 9 Terminal at Khatima.

== See also ==
- List of national highways in India
- List of national highways in India by state
