= Jamania =

Jamania can refer to:

- Jamania, Ghazipur district
- Jamania, Pilibhit district
- Jamunia, Madhya Pradesh a.k.a. Jamania, Madhya Pradesh
