= Pilibhit (disambiguation) =

Pilibhit may also refer to:

== Places ==
- Pilibhit, a city in Pilibhit district, Bareilly division, Uttar Pradesh, India
- Pilibhit Junction railway station, a railway station in Izzatnagar railway division
- Pilibhit Tiger Reserve, a tiger reserved area located in Pilibhit district of Uttar Pradesh, notified as a tiger reserve in 2014
- Pilibhit Road, National Highway 734 (India)

== Administrative Unit ==
- Pilibhit district, a district in Uttar Pradesh, India
- Pilibhit Lok Sabha constituency, one of the 80 parliamentary constituencies to elect a member to the Lok Sabha, the lower house of India's parliament
- Pilibhit Assembly constituency, one of the 403 constituencies of the Uttar Pradesh Legislative Assembly, India

== Movies ==
- Sherdil: The Pilibhit Saga, a 2022 Indian Hindi-language adventure drama film which is written and directed by Srijit Mukherji

== See also ==
- List of villages in Pilibhit district, list of 1,406 villages in the Pilibhit district in the Indian state of Uttar Pradesh
- Bareilly–Pilibheet Provincial State Railway, former railway in India
