= Mursena Madari =

Mursena Madari is a village of Pilibhit District, Uttar Pradesh, India. The population is about 2000.

Mursena Madari is 22 km from Pilibhit and 13 km from Block Amariya.
