= Puranpur Khas (Rural) =

Village in Uttar Pradesh, India

- Village
- Location within Uttar Pradesh Location within India
- Coordinates: 28°30′29″N 80°09′33″E
- Country: India
- State: Uttar Pradesh
- District: Pilibhit
- Tehsil: Puranpur

Government
  - Type: Sarpanch

Area
  - Total: 4.07 km^{2} (1.57 sq mi)
- Elevation: 188 m (617 ft)

Population (2011)
  - Total: 35,948
  - Density: 8,830/km^{2} (22,900/sq mi)

Languages
  - Official: Hindi
- Time zone: UTC+5:30 (IST)
- PIN: 262122
- STD code: 05880
- Vehicle registration: UP-26

Puranpur Khas (Rural) is a village in Puranpur Tehsil, Pilibhit District, Uttar Pradesh, India. It sits near the northern border with Nepal, about 35 kilometres southeast of the district seat Pilibhit, and 1 kilometres southeast of the tehsil seat Puranpur. At the 2011 Census, the village's population was 35,948.

== Geography ==
Puranpur Khas is located on the suburb of Puranpur. It has a total area of 407.1 hectares.

== Demographics ==
According to the 2011 Census of India, Puranpur Khas had a population of 35,948, of which 18,744 were male and 17,204 were female. The average literacy rate was 34.53%, with 7,621 of the male inhabitants and 4,792 of the female population being literate.
