= National Highway 730B (India) =

National Highway in India

National Highway 730B

Route information
- Auxiliary route of NH 30
- Length: 36 km (22 mi)

Major junctions
- West end: Bareilly
- East end: Bisalpur

Location
- Country: India
- States: Uttar Pradesh
- Primary destinations: Bhutah

Highway system
- Roads in India; Expressways; National; State; Asian
← NH 30	→ NH 731K

National Highway 730B, commonly referred to as NH 730B is a national highway in India. It is a secondary route of National Highway 30. NH-730B runs in the state of Uttar Pradesh in India.

== Route ==
NH730B connects Bareilly, Bhutah and Bisalpur in the state of Uttar Pradesh.

== Junctions ==
NH 30 Terminal near Bareilly.
NH 730C near Bisalpur
NH 731K Terminal at Bisalpur.

== See also ==
- List of national highways in India
- List of national highways in India by state
