= Harsinghpur =

Village in Uttar Pradesh, India

Harsinghpur is a village near Puranpur in Pilibhit district in the Indian state of Uttar Pradesh. Harsinghpur is situated at (NH 730)four km from Puranpur on the way to Pilibhit.

== Demographics ==
As of 2011 India census, total population of village is 133 and total house holds are 18. Main occupation of people is farming and Dairying in Harsinghpur village. All the families in this village are migrated from Punjab and settled permanently. Harsinghpur is very small village but famous in the area.

== Religion ==
Sikhism

== Language Spoken ==
- Punjabi
- English
- Hindi

== Important Places ==
- Gurudwara Singh Sabhaa (Established By Sant Baba Kesar Singh Ji) is main religious place in this village.

== Families of Village ==
- Cheema Family -( Migrated from Village Jhuggian Near Mehatpur, Nakodar, District- Jalandhar )Punjab And ancestral Village is Kotli Near Sahowala, District- Sialkot, Punjab (1947) (now in Pakistan) -Migrated around 1967–68
- Chhina Family - Migrated from Amritsar District
- Sandhu Family - Migrated from Mirakot Village, Amritsar

== Other places ==
- Cheema Farms
- Chhina Marriage palace
- Gurunanak Rice mill
- Agriclinic And Agribusiness Centre
- PowerMax Gym and Fitness Point

== Crops ==
- Wheat
- Paddy
- Sugarcane
- Mustard
