= National Highway 730C (India) =

National Highway in India

National Highway 730C

Route information
- Auxiliary route of NH 30
- Length: 156 km (97 mi)

Major junctions
- North end: Bisalpur
- South end: Bewar

Location
- Country: India
- States: Uttar Pradesh

Highway system
- Roads in India; Expressways; National; State; Asian
← NH 730B	→ NH 34

National Highway 730C, commonly referred to as NH 730C is a national highway in India. It is a secondary route of National Highway 30. NH-730C runs in the state of Uttar Pradesh in India.

== Route ==
NH730C connects Bisalpur, Miranpur Katra(Tehsil Tilhar), Fatehgarh and Bewar in the state of Uttar Pradesh.

== Junctions ==
NH 730B Terminal near Bisalpur.
NH 30 near town Miranpur Katra Tehsil Tilhar
NH 34 Terminal near Bewar.

== See also ==
- List of national highways in India
- List of national highways in India by state
