= Nyoria Husainpur =

Neoria Husainpur
- Town
- Location in Uttar Pradesh, India
- Coordinates: 28.736166°N 79.892321°E
- Country: India
- State: Uttar Pradesh
- District: Pilibhit

Population (2001)
  - Total: 40,782

Languages
  - Official: Hindi, Urdu
- Time zone: UTC+5:30 (IST)
- Postal code: 262305

Nyoria Husainpur alias Neoria Husainpur, is a town and a Nagar panchayat in Pilibhit district in the Indian state of Uttar Pradesh.

== Demographics ==
As of the 2001 Census of India, Nyoria Husainpur had a population of 40,782. Males constitute 52% of the population and females 48%. Nyoria Husainpur has an average literacy rate of 29%, lower than the national average of 59.5%: male literacy is 37%, and female literacy is 20%. In Nyoria Husainpur, 16% of the population is under six years of age. It is a Muslim dominated (88.30%, census 2011) town, specially Muslim Banjara community lives here. The main source of income of the town is agriculture. This town was famous for the quality of earthen pot and rice. It is 15 km north of the district center Pilibhit.

The Nyoria husainpur Famous Gali is Meena Bazaar specially for festival season. There are some picnic spots also nearby like Chooka beach, Mala jungle range (Tiger reserve) and Nanakmatta .

== Employment ==
Majority people depend on agriculture in Neoria. People also travel to metropolitan cities mostly Delhi, Gujarat for employment. Neoria is surrounded by villages – Gauhar, Bithra, Neoria colony.
