= Sitarganj =

- City
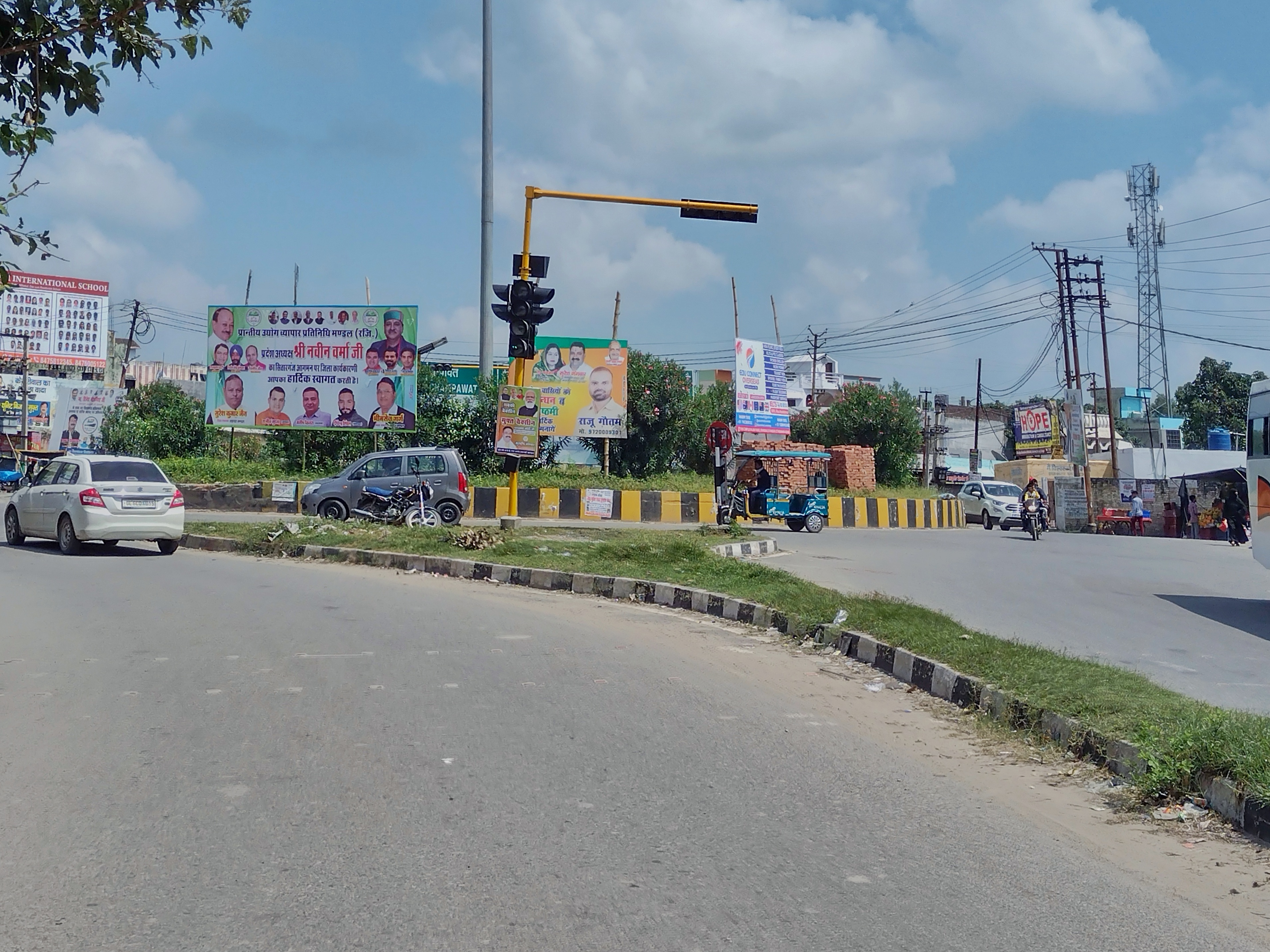
- Sitarganj Main Chowk

- Location in Uttarakhand, India Sitarganj (India)
- Coordinates: 28.93°N 79.70°E
- Country: India
- State: Uttarakhand
- District: Udham Singh Nagar

Government
  - Body: Municipal Council
  - Chairman: Sukhdev Singh (BJP)
  - MLA: Saurabh Bahuguna (BJP)
  - MP: Ajay Bhatt (BJP)
- Elevation: 298 m (978 ft)

Population (2021)
  - Total: 148,266

Languages
  - Official: Hindi
  - Native: Tharu
- Time zone: UTC+5:30 (IST)
- PIN: 262405
- Telephone code: 05948
- Vehicle registration: UK 06
- Sex ratio: 805♂/♀
- Website: sitarganj.com

Sitarganj is a city and a municipal board in Udham Singh Nagar district in the Indian state of Uttarakhand.

== Geography ==
Sitarganj is located at 28.93°N 79.70°E. It has an average elevation of 298 metres (978 feet).

Sitarganj comes under the Terai Agro Climatic zone of Uttarakhand.

Coca-Cola plans to set up a bottling plant in Sitarganj in 70 acres of land that will be provided by the Uttarakhand government.

== Demographics ==
As of 2021 India census, Sitarganj Tehsil had a population of 148266 in which 21893 population lives in main city.. Males constitute 53% of the population and females 47%. The SC and ST population is 14.3% and 13.1% respectively. In Sitarganj, 13% of the population is under 6 years of age.As of 2021 India census, Sitarganj has a low proportion of primary and secondary schools than the district aggregate, but still Sitarganj has an average literacy rate of 76%, higher than the national average of 59.5%: with male literacy of 79%, and female literacy being 66%.

Religions in Sitarganj
Religion	Percent
Hindus	66%
Muslims	33%
Jains	0.7%
Others†	0.3%
Distribution of religions †Includes Sikhs (0.2%), Buddhists (<0.2%).
