= Jamunia =

Human settlement in Chhatarpur district, Sagar division, Madhya Pradesh, India

Coordinates: 24°55′0″N 79°52′0″E

Jamunīa or Jamania is a village in Chhatarpur District, Madhya Pradesh, India. Jamunia is also a name for amethyst.
