= Gularia Bhindara =

Gularia Bhindara, Pilibhit
- Town
- Location in Uttar Pradesh, India Gularia Bhindara, Pilibhit (India)
- Coordinates: 28°39′19″N 79°47′12″E
- Country: India
- State: Uttar Pradesh
- District: Pilibhit

Population (2001)
  - Total: 6,509

Languages
  - Official: Hindi
- Time zone: UTC+5:30 (IST)
- Postal code: 262302
- Vehicle registration: UP
- Website: up.gov.in

Gularia Bhindara is a town and a nagar panchayat in Pilibhit district in the Indian state of Uttar Pradesh.

== Demographics ==
As of the 2001 Indian census, Gularia Bhindara had a population of 6,183. Males constitute 55% of the population and females 45%. Gularia Bhindara has an average literacy rate of 60%, just a shade higher than the national average of 59.5%: male literacy is 66%, and female literacy is 51%. In Gularia Bhindara, 14% of the population is under 6 years of age.
