= Jamania, Pilibhit =

Coordinates: 28°39′N 80°03′E

Jamania is a village in Pilibhit district, Uttar Pradesh, India. geographical coordinates: 28° 39' 0" North, 80° 3' 0" East
