= Jahanabad, Pilibhit =

- Town
- Jahanabad (District-Pilibhit)
- Location in Uttar Pradesh, India Jahanabad, Pilibhit (India)
- Coordinates: 28.6333°N 79.8000°E
- Country: India
- State: Uttar Pradesh
- District: Pilibhit
- Elevation: 125 m (410 ft)

Population (2020)
  - Total: 20,000

Languages
  - Official: Hindi
- Time zone: UTC+5:30 (IST)
- Postal code: 262001
- Vehicle registration: UP
- Website: pilibhit.nic.in

Jahanabad is a town and a nagar panchayat in Pilibhit district in the Indian state of Uttar Pradesh. Community Health Center (CHC) is situated near bazar Jagdeeshpur road. CHC is providing health facilities to community. CHC is under department of medical, health & family welfare . CHC Jahanabad is under block Lalaurikhera .

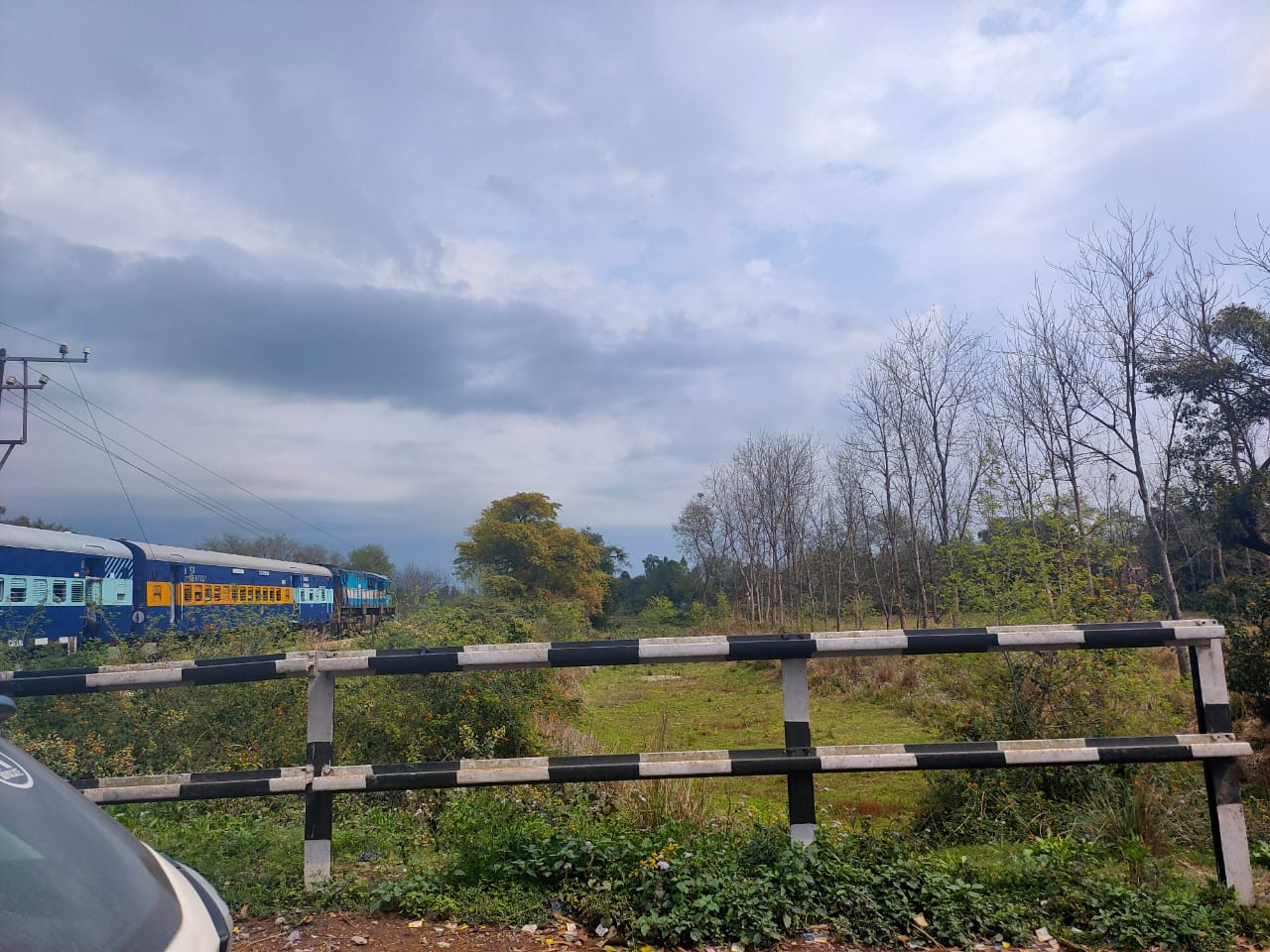
Green Land - Fertile Land all around Town Jahanabad

Town Jahanabad's major source of earning is agriculture.

Religion wise 98% of the total population is equally held by Hindus & Muslims and rest has been held by other religions like Sikhs, Christians and few more.

60% of the farmers of this town prefer cultivating the sugarcane crop, other 30% prefer the crops of wheat and rice, rest 10% are into other crops. Land is very fertile all around the town.

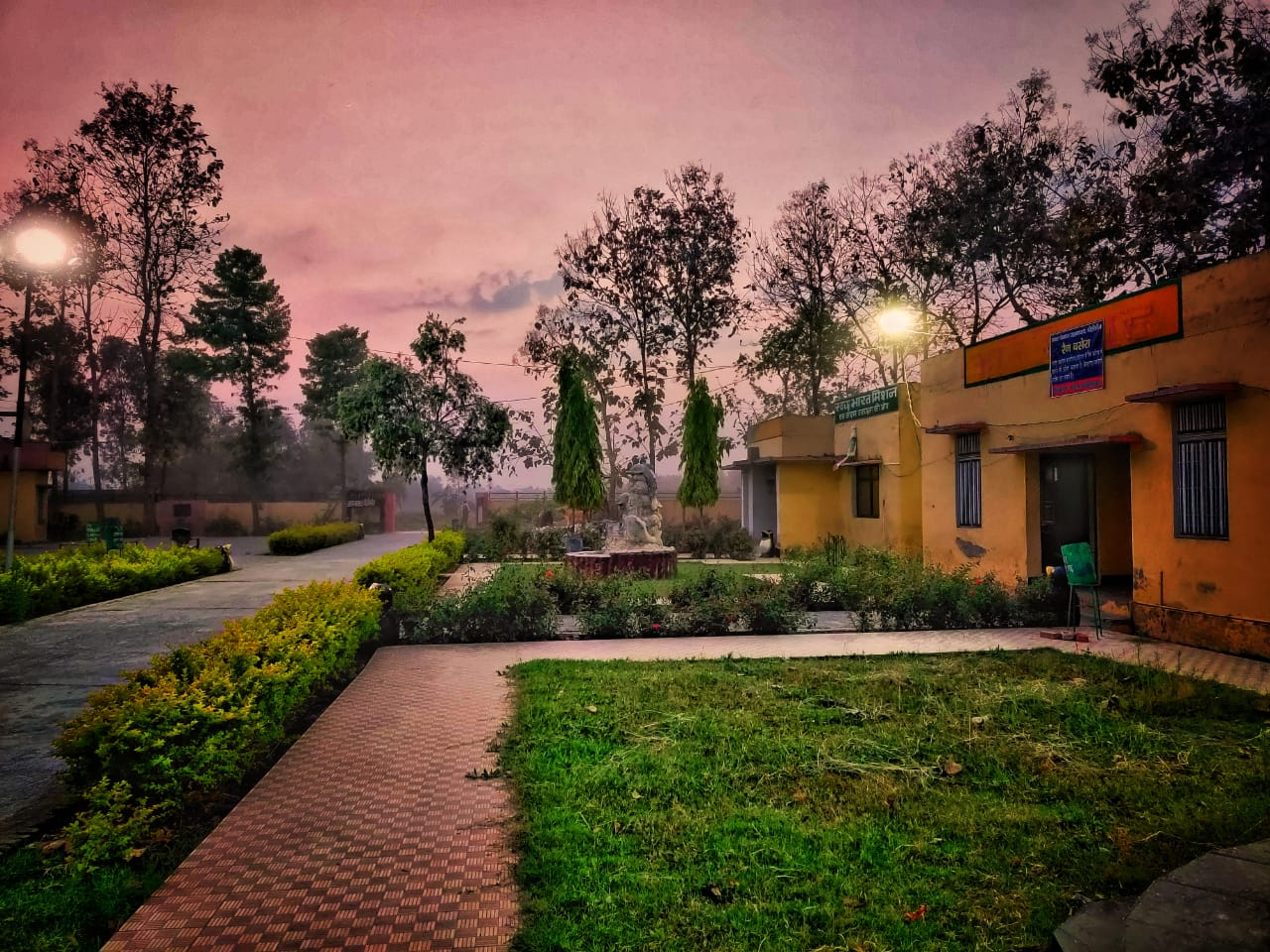
Jahanabad Nagar Panchayat Office

Town Jahanabad is having major three connecting roads,

1. Pilibhit-Bareilly Highway; 2. Pilibhit-Amariya Highway; 3. Jahanabad-Bahedi Highway.

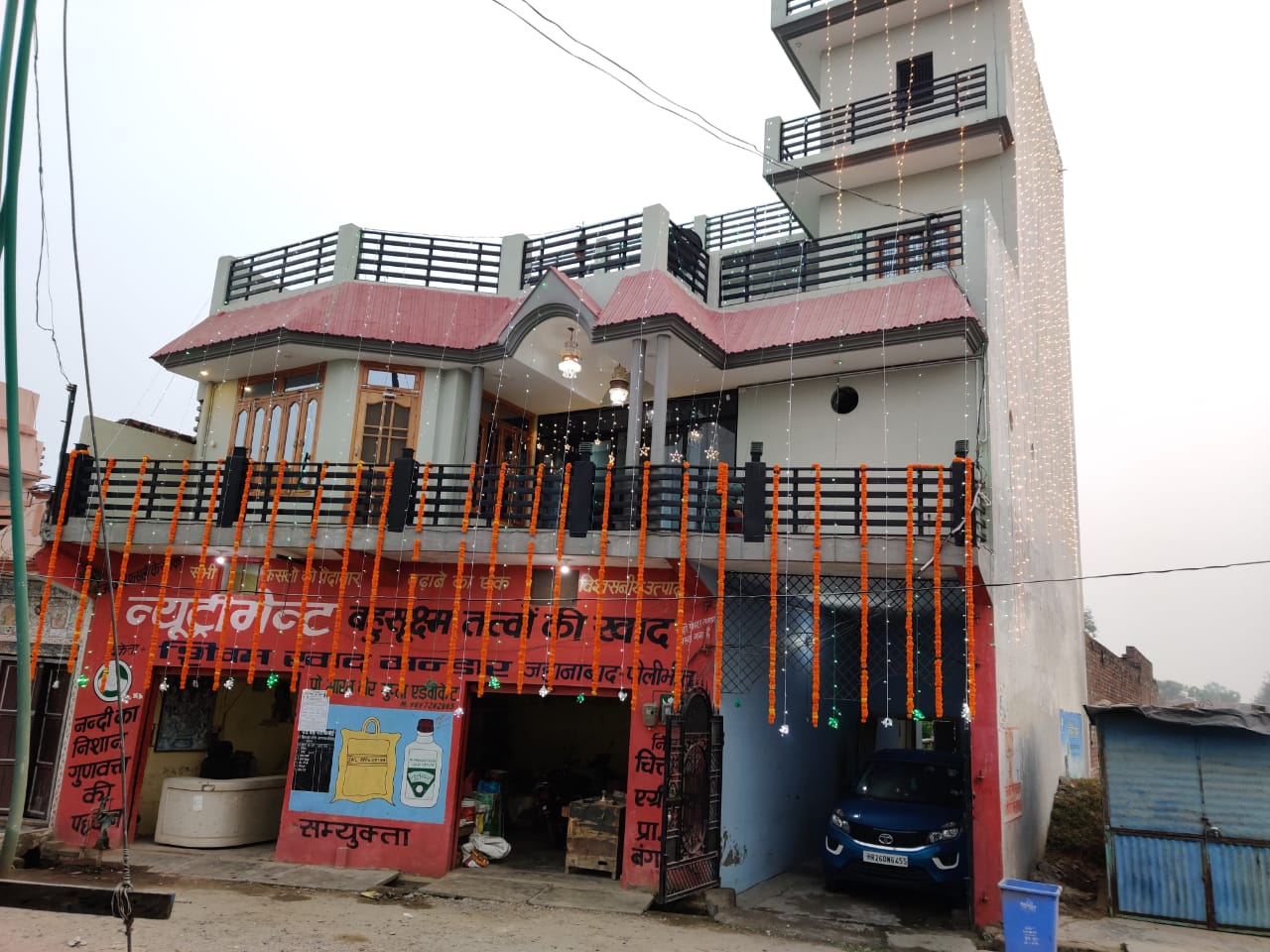
Building was occupied by Priya Video Talkiz in past.

The oldest market place of this town is known as 'Bazar-Katra' is available at main town road connecting to the town-police-station. Bazar-Katra is having a different variety of shops/stores to fulfill the basic needs of the town, such as Jewellery showroom, Ready-made garments stores, Iron stores, Medical stores, Convenience stores, Grocery store, Sweet Shops, Meat Stores, etc.

This town is having Government managed Hospital & several clinic facilities, schools, Banks, and Post Office.

In earlier days, this town had a well known landmark 'A Cinema Hall' named as 'Priya Video Talkiz' that was no longer exist.

== Demographics ==
As of the 2001 Census of India, Jahanabad had a population of 12,420. Males constitute 53% of the population and females 47%. Jahanabad has an average literacy rate of 37%, lower than the national average of 59.5%: male literacy is 46%, and female literacy is 26%. In Jahanabad, 19% of the population is under 6 years of age.
