= Bilsanda =

Bilsanda, Pilibhit
- Town
- Location in Uttar Pradesh, India Bilsanda, Pilibhit (India)
- Coordinates: 28.25°N 79.35°E
- Country: India
- State: Uttar Pradesh
- District: Pilibhit
- Elevation: 161 m (528 ft)

Population (2001)
  - Total: 13,474

Languages
  - Official: Hindi
- Time zone: UTC+5:30 (IST)
- Vehicle registration: UP
- Website: up.gov.in

Bilsanda is a town and nagar panchayat in the Pilibhit district of Uttar Pradesh, India.

== Geography ==
Bilsanda is located at 28.25°N 79.95°E. It has an average elevation of 161 metres (528 feet).

== Demographics ==
As of the 2001 Census of India, Bilsanda had a population of 13,474. Males constitute 53% of the population and females 47%. Bilsanda has an average literacy rate of 54%, lower than the national average of 59.5%; with male literacy of 60% and female literacy of 47%. 16% of the population is under 6 years of age.
