= Kalinagar =

- Town
- Location in Uttar Pradesh, India
- Coordinates: 28.62°N 80.1°E
- Country: India
- State: Uttar Pradesh
- District: Pilibhit
- Elevation: 184 m (604 ft)

Population (2001)
  - Total: 9,984

Languages
  - Official: Hindi
- Time zone: UTC+5:30 (IST)

Kalinagar is a town and a nagar panchayat in Pilibhit district in the Indian state of Uttar Pradesh. Kalinagar is a new tehsil of district Pilibhit Pin code -262124

== Geography ==
Kalinagar is located at 28.62°N 80.1°E. It has an average elevation of 184 metres (603 feet).

== Demographics ==
As of the 2001 Census of India, Kalinagar had a population of 9,984. Males constitute 53% of the population and females 47%. Kalinagar has an average literacy rate of 34%, lower than the national average of 59.5%: male literacy is 45%, and female literacy is 22%. In Kalinagar, 20% of the population is under six years of age.
