= Puranpur =

- Town
- Nickname: Tiger reserves
- Location in Uttar Pradesh, India
- Coordinates: 28.52°N 80.15°E
- Country: India
- State: Uttar Pradesh
- District: Pilibhit
- Elevation: 180 m (590 ft)

Population (2011)
  - Total: 19,042

Languages
  - Official: Hindi
- Time zone: UTC+5:30 (IST)
- PIN: 262122
- Telephone code: 5880

Puranpur is a town and a municipal board in Pilibhit district in the Indian state of Uttar Pradesh. Puranpur is divided into 25 wards with elections every 5 years. Due to dense Sikh population, the area is also known as Mini Punjab after the Partition of India in 1947.

== Demographics ==
According to Census 2011, primary population is Hindu, followed by Muslims and Christians. After independence and Partition of India the large numbers of Sikhs migrated and settled in the Puranpur Region.

Puranpur has a population of 40,007 of which 20,924 are males while 19,083 are females. Children from 0-6 is 4,695, 11.74 % of total population. The female sex ratio is of 912 against state average of 912. The child sex ratio is around 892 compared to Uttar Pradesh state average of 902. The literacy rate is 69.65 %, higher than state average of 67.68 %. Male literacy is around 75.77 % while the female literacy rate is 62.95 %.

== Languages ==
- Hindi
- Punjabi
- Urdu
- English

== Transport ==
=== Bus ===
Puranpur is well connected with Pilibhit, Delhi, Lucknow and Bareilly by State Transport UPSRTC buses. Some UPSRTC AC Shatabdi buses run from Puranpur to Delhi, Lucknow.

=== Rail ===
Puranpur Railway Station is located on the Aishbagh–Bareilly–Kasganj railway section and falls under the administrative jurisdiction of the North Eastern Railway. Following the completion of broad-gauge conversion, the station now offers improved rail connectivity to several destinations, including Kasganj, Kolkata, Lucknow, and Kichha. Passengers can travel to these destinations through various train services. Train schedules, availability, and booking details can be checked on the official IRCTC website.
