= Barkhera =

Barkhera, Pilibhit
- Town
- Location in Uttar Pradesh, India Barkhera, Pilibhit (India)
- Coordinates: 28.45°N 79.8°E
- Country: India
- State: Uttar Pradesh
- District: Pilibhit
- Elevation: 165 m (541 ft)

Population (2001)
  - Total: 9,881

Languages
  - Official: Hindi
- Time zone: UTC+5:30 (IST)
- Vehicle registration: UP
- Website: up.gov.in

Barkhera is a town and a nagar panchayat in Pilibhit district in the Indian state of Uttar Pradesh.

== Geography ==
Barkhera is located at 28.45°N 79.8°E. It has an average elevation of 165 metres (541 ft).

== Demographics ==
At the 2001 Census of India, Barkhera had a population of 9,881 (males 54%, females 46%). Barkhera had an average literacy rate of 41% (70% male; 30% female), lower than the national average of 59.5%. 20% of the population was under 6 years of age. Late Mr. Gopi Krishna Saxena BJP Leader submit himself in jail with Prime Minister Mr. Atal Bihari Bajpai, during jail bharo aandolan in 1977.

== Industries in the Area ==
The town has big industries in its area. There is a sugar Plant of Novel Industries in Berkhera. There is also a Sugar Plant of Bajaj Hindustan Limited and a Thermal Power Plant of Baja Energy Limited in the area.
