= Pilibhit =

City in Uttar Pradesh, India

- City
- A Building in Pilibhit Gauri-Shankar Temple in Pilibhit

- Location in Uttar Pradesh, India
- Coordinates: 28°37′36″N 79°48′21″E
- Country: India
- State: Uttar Pradesh
- Region: Rohilkhand
- Division: Bareilly
- District: Pilibhit
- Ward: 27
- Settled: Late 15th century

Government
  - Type: City council
  - Body: Pilibhit Municipal Council
  - Chairperson: Dr. Aashta Agarwal
  - Member of Parliament, Lok Sabha: Jitin Prasada
  - Member of State Legislative Assembly: Sanjay Singh Gangwar

Area
  - Total: 26.22 km^{2} (10.12 sq mi)
  - Rank: 367th (Nationwide)
- Elevation: 172 m (564 ft)

Population (2023)
  - Total: 175,000
  - Rank: 276th (Nationwide)
  - Density: 559/km^{2} (1,450/sq mi)
- Demonym: Pilbhitiya
- Time zone: UTC+5:30 (IST)
- PIN: 262001
- Telephone code: 05882
- ISO 3166 code: IN-UP-PB
- Vehicle registration: UP-26
- Coastline: 0 kilometres (0 mi)
- Gender ratio: 893 ♂/♀
- Literacy: 72.73%
- Civic agency: Pilibhit Municipal Council
- Distance from New Delhi: 274 kilometres (170 mi) NW (land)
- Distance from Lucknow: 270 kilometres (170 mi) SE (land)
- Governing body: State government Central government
- Climate: HS-TH (Köppen)
- Precipitation: 780 millimetres (31 in)
- Avg. annual temperature: 25.5 °C (77.9 °F)
- Avg. summer temperature: 36.8 °C (98.2 °F)
- Avg. winter temperature: 14.5 °C (58.1 °F)
- Website: www.pilibhit.nic.in

Pilibhit (pronounced [piːliːbʱiːt̪]) is a city and a municipal board in Pilibhit district in the northern Indian state of Uttar Pradesh. Pilibhit is the north-easternmost district of Bareilly division, situated in the Rohilkhand region of the sub-Himalayan Plateau belt next to foothills of Sivalik Range on the boundary of Nepal, known for the origin of river Gomati and one of the most forest-rich areas in North India. Pilibhit was also known as Bansuri Nagari – the land of flutes, for making and exporting roughly 95% of India's flutes.

According to a report issued by the Government of India, Pilibhit is one of the Minority Concentrated Areas in India based on the 2001 census data on population, socio-economic indicators, and basic amenities indicators. Though separated only by a short distance from the outer ranges of the Himalayas, Pilibhit consists entirely of a level plain, containing depressions but no hills and is intersected by several streams. Pilibhit is one of the forest-rich areas of Uttar Pradesh. The almost 54 km-long Indo-Nepal international border makes Pilibhit a highly sensitive for security purposes. According to an estimate by the Government of India, Pilibhit has 45.23% of its population living under the poverty line as of July 2007. Increasing population and unemployment is a cause of worry in the area, and many non-governmental organizations (NGOs) and government-run organizations have initiated projects to provide employment, but human resources are yet to be exploited in full. The city came third-bottom in terms of hygiene and sanitation in a Government ranking list of 423 towns and cities in India.

== History ==
Pilibhit forests area are a home for the striped cats, tiger, bear, and many species of birds. A proposal, created in 2005, to make a home for the endangered cats in Pilibhit forests was sent to the government of India in April 2008. was declared in September 2008 based on its special type of ecosystem with vast open spaces and sufficient feed for the elegant predators.

It is believed by locals that Pilibhit was ruled by an ancient king named Mayurdhwaj or Moredhwaj or King Venu, a great devotee of lord Krishna and a loyal friend of Arjun. King Venu's name and the geography of his kingdom can be traced in the Hindu epic Mahabharat.

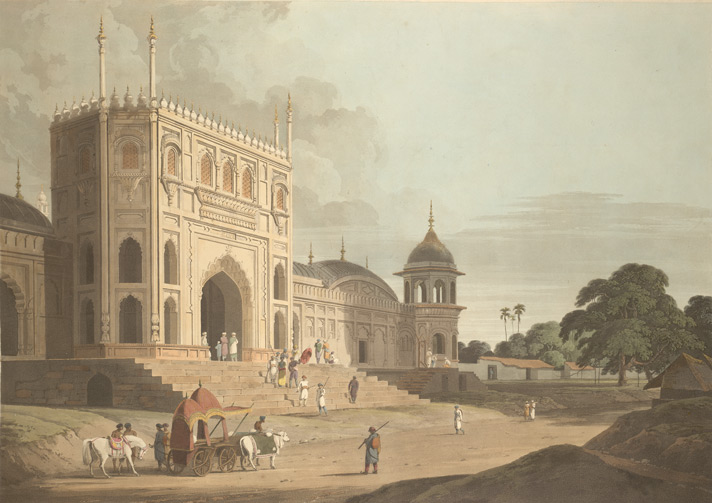
Jamia Mosque in the 1780s

The city Pilibhit was an administrative unit in the Mughal era under Bareilly suba. For security, the Mughal subedar Ali Mohammed Khan constructed four magnificent gates around the administrative building in 1734 AD. These gates were named Barellwi Darwaza at the west, Hussaini Darwaza at the east, Jahanabadi Darwaza at the north and Dakhini Darwaza at the south. Because of a lack of proper maintenance, all the gates have been lost; only their ruins remain. He also constructed a jama asjid (congregational mosque) in Pilibhit.

The last king of the Shah dynasty of Doti, Nepal, Prithvipati Shah, was sheltered in Pilibhit by the ruler of Rampur State Faizullah Khan in 1789 AD, after being attacked by the Gorkha Kingdom of Nepal.

The freedom fighter Maulana Inayatullah, from Pilibhit, voluntarily hosted the exiled Queen of Avadh, Begum Hazrat Mahal, who reached Nepal in late 1859.

Pilibhit was in the news at the national level because of a man-killer sub-adult tiger, which had caused fear in the whole area in and around the forest. By August 2010, the cat had killed and partially eaten eight people.

== Etymology ==
According to the Imperial Gazetteer of India, Pilibhit was once known as Hafizabad after the Rohila leader of the area, Hafiz Rahmat Khan, but later took its current name from a nearby village. According to a document from the British Library, 'the city Pilibhit' existed in the late 18th century (1770–1780) when Marathas invaded the Rohilkhand region. With this invasion, the Kurmi community came to this region and over time, the city Pilibhit enlarged it boundaries.

Another evidence of the city's existence is found in Nepali literature, which mentions a city named as Pilibhit, which provided shelter to the last king of the Shah dynasty, Deepa Shah, who was attacked by the Gorakha king in 1789 AD.

== Geography ==
Pilibhit lies between the parallels of 28°64' and 29°53' north latitude and the meridians of 79°57' and 81°37' east longitude covering an area of 68.76 km^{2}. The north side of Pilibhit is bordered by Udham Singh Nagar district of Uttarakhand state and by the territory of Nepal. Shahjahanpur lies on the south side Pilibhit. The east of Pilibhit is flanked for a short distance by Lakhimpur Kheri and the remaining distance is swathed by the Shahjahanpur. The western limit touches the limits of Bareilly.

According to the Central Statistical Organisation, the district Pilibhit had an area of 3504 km^{2} on 1 September 2007, occupying 46th position in the state and the total area of the Pilibhit city is 68.76 km^{2}. Pilibhit city, with 2365.11 people per square kilometre, is more densely populated than the rest of the district, which has 469.51 people per km^{2}.

The area has diverse features, and topographically may be divided into several distinct tracts. In the north and north-west, the tract is a continuation of the Terai. The southern portion of the Bisalpur tehsil is similar in most respect to the adjacent tract of Bareilly and Shahjahanpur. The eastern and smaller section approximates rather to undeveloped forest areas of Lakhimpur Kheri, though with the spread of cultivation the dissimilarity between Puranpur and the rest of the area is gradually becoming less marked. There are 1406 villages within Pilibhit's limits, of which 982 are electrified.

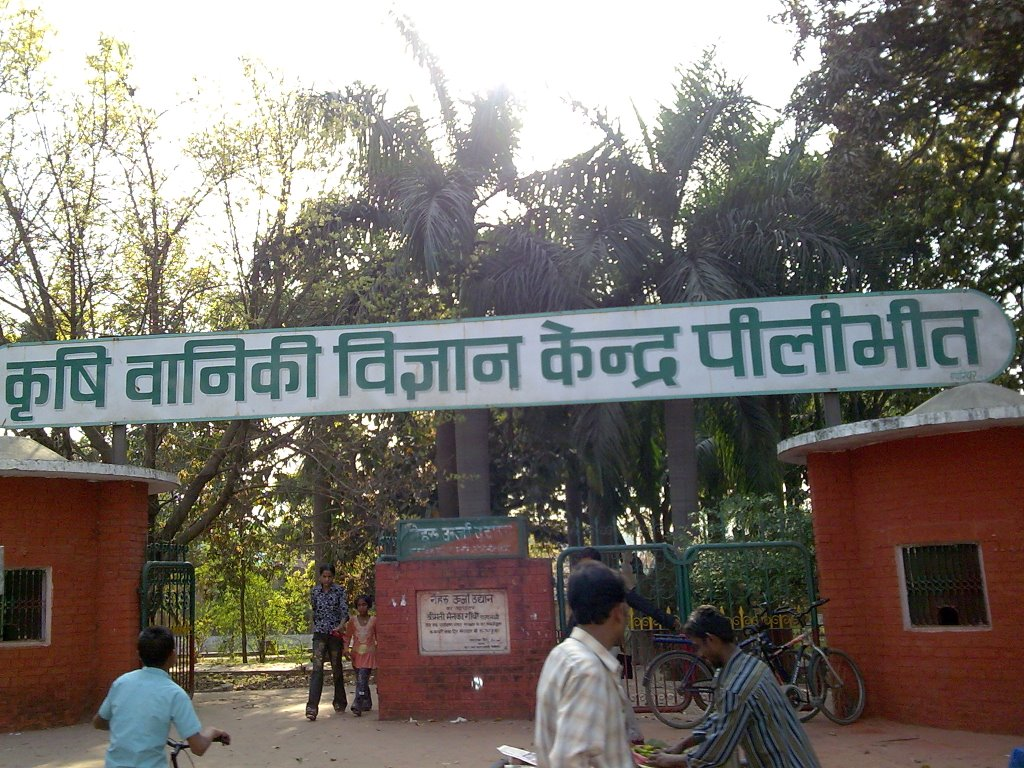
Agricultural and forestry science center, Pilibhit

The area has more than ten small to medium-sized rivers and nine small to medium-sized water bodies. The Gomti River (also spelled Gumti or Gomati; Hindi: गोमती), which is a tributary of the Ganges River, is from a small lake, Gomat Taal, situated in Madhotanda in the Puranpur Tehsil region.

Pilibhit city also has a few water bodies in its limits, one being on Tanakpur road in front of the Dramond college gate, another being at the Chauraha degree college. Every year during winter, the Chauraha water body attracts thousands of migratory birds. The main source of water in the district is the groundwater and the canals. District Pilibhit is swathed by a big net of canals. The district has six main feeders or canals, which run through almost 138 km in the district. The northeastern boundary of the reserve is the Sharda River (Nepali: Mahakali River) which defines the Indo-Nepal border, while the southwest boundary is marked by the River Sharda and the River Ghaghara. The reserve has a core zone area of 602.79 km^{2} (232.74 sq mi) and a buffer zone area of 127.45 km^{2} (49.21 sq mi). Elevation ranges from 168 to 175 meters above mean sea level.

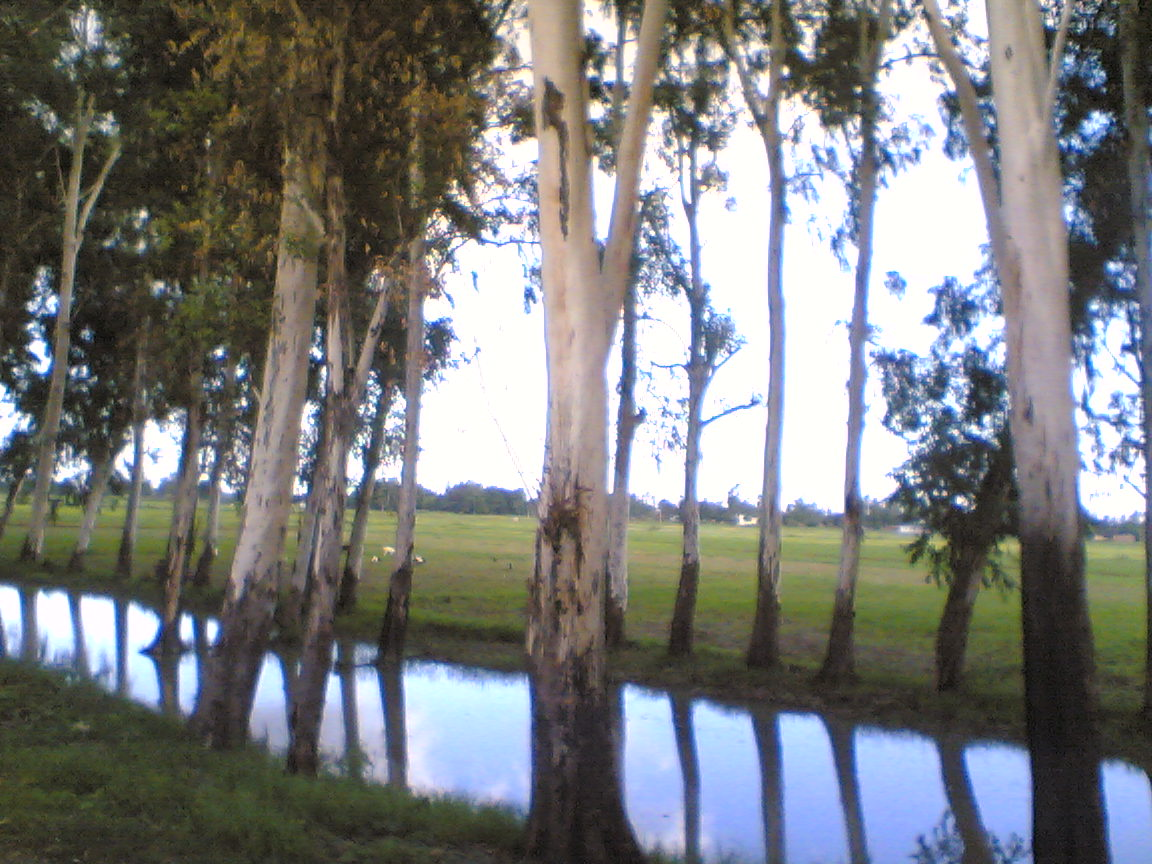
Roadside canals are very common around Pilibhit

The major part of Pilibhit District is covered by dense forest. Total 784.572 km^{2} is forest. Till 1978, 63% area of the district was a dense forest, but deforestation has reduced the total forest cover to 22.39% in 2004. The Sharda canal is the main canal of the district, the others being its branches. The total length of canals in the district is 138 km. Apart from the canal system, the district also has a few water bodies, which are being used for agriculture purposes.

National Highway No. 74 runs through the district connecting Haridwar to Bareilly via Kichha, Kashipur and Nagina city. The Pilibhit also has several places of religious importance in or around the city. A main gurudwara of the Sikh community is located in Nanakmatta town around 46 km from the city.

== Transportation ==
=== Pilibhit Junction railway station ===
Pilibhit Junction railway station has trains connecting to cities including Bareilly, Tanakpur, Shahjahanpur, and Mailani. It is not connected with many neighbouring cities like Agra, Kanpur, Jaipur, Rampur, Dehradun etc. The Bareilly Airport (BEK) is only 40 km away from Pilibhit. From BEK there are direct flights to Mumbai and Bangalore.

=== Pilibhit UPSRTC Bus Depot ===
Pilibhit UPSRTC buses connect to major cities including Bareilly, Tanakpur, Shahjahanpur, and Mailani.

== Sports ==
=== Lalit Hari Sugar Factory Stadium ===
Lalit Hari Sugar Factory Stadium is mainly used for cricket. It was built in 1931. It has a matting type of pitch. This stadium had hosted a few Ranji trophy cricket matches in the early 1980s. The stadium is located in the Shri Lalit Hari sugar mill compound.

=== Gandhi Stadium ===
This stadium is under control of the Indian government. This stadium is mainly used for hockey, football, and karate.

=== Other stadiums ===
Various educational institutions have their own sports grounds, including DGIC, St. Aloysius, Rama College, and SVM college. The city teams have produced many national level athletes who represented themselves at national tournaments and different events and have won a few state level and national level competitions on various events.

== Infrastructure ==
The city's roads are in poor condition, making them inadequate for smooth transportation. The roads are highly congested, which hinders the city's growth and development compared to other cities in India. Waterlogging during floods, caused by inadequate stormwater drainage, is a frequent issue in the city.

== Demographics ==
As of the 2011 India census, District Pilibhit had a population of 2,037,225. Pilibhit district is the 46th most populous Districts of Uttar Pradesh. Pilibhit City has 197,455 people. Males constitute 52.94% of the population and females 47.06%. Pilibhit has an average literacy rate of 63.58%, lower than the national average of 74.04%. Male literacy is 73.46%, and female literacy is 52.43%. In Pilibhit, 14.58% of the population is under 6 years of age.

In 1901, the population of the district was 470,339, a decrease of 3% on the previous decade.

Studies reveal that the poverty level in the district is associated with the social identity, source of livelihood, landless and level of education of the head of the household. Education is a crucial instrument for raising income levels of people and moving out of the vicious circle of poverty. A study done by Delhi-based NGO, Nav Bharat Nirman indicates a strong correlation between educational attainment and poverty levels among various social classes in the district. The incidence of poverty is much higher among scheduled castes (SC) and scheduled tribes (ST) households in Pilibhit. Nearly 60 percent of SC households were below the poverty line in Pilibhit in 1999–2000. However, this proportion came down to 45.23 percent in 2007–08.

== Climate ==
Pilibhit experiences winter from November to February. It experiences pleasant windy days, clear skies and cool nights from November to the end of February. The day temperature hovers around 14 °C (57 °F) while night temperature is below 7 °C (45 °F) for most of December and January, often dropping to 3 °C (37 °F) or 4 °C (39 °F). Rain is very expected in February.

Climate data for Pilibhit
Month	Jan	Feb	Mar	Apr	May	Jun	Jul	Aug	Sep	Oct	Nov	Dec	Year
Record high °C (°F)	28.0 (82.4)	36.0 (96.8)	41.0 (105.8)	46.0 (114.8)	49.0 (120.2)	49.0 (120.2)	46.0 (114.8)	40.6 (105.1)	39.0 (102.2)	39.0 (102.2)	35.0 (95.0)	31.0 (87.8)	49.0 (120.2)
Mean daily maximum °C (°F)	22.56 (72.61)	26.11 (79.00)	32.44 (90.39)	38.35 (101.03)	41.96 (107.53)	41.40 (106.52)	35.61 (96.10)	34.26 (93.67)	33.64 (92.55)	33.16 (91.69)	29.44 (84.99)	24.73 (76.51)	32.81 (91.05)
Mean daily minimum °C (°F)	10.52 (50.94)	12.9 (55.2)	17.45 (63.41)	23.42 (74.16)	27.46 (81.43)	28.98 (84.16)	27.04 (80.67)	25.89 (78.60)	24.33 (75.79)	21.1 (70.0)	17.28 (63.10)	12.99 (55.38)	20.78 (69.40)
Record low °C (°F)	4.0 (39.2)	6.0 (42.8)	10.0 (50.0)	16.0 (60.8)	21.0 (69.8)	22.0 (71.6)	21.0 (69.8)	23.0 (73.4)	20.0 (68.0)	15.0 (59.0)	10.0 (50.0)	6.0 (42.8)	4.0 (39.2)
Average rainfall mm (inches)	30 (1.18)	34 (1.33)	23 (0.91)	21 (0.84)	26 (1.02)	131 (5.15)	494 (19.43)	479 (18.84)	208 (8.19)	13 (0.52)	1.8 (0.07)	14 (0.57)	1,474.8 (58.05)
Average relative humidity (%)	52.07	49.74	34.63	23.43	23.73	36.74	66.73	73.15	71.41	52.67	43.39	43.39	47.57
Source: weatherandclimate

== Economy ==
The main crop in the district is sugarcane and there is a sugar factory in the city. According to an article published in Hindustan Times, by a 1991 estimate, 95% of India's flutes were manufactured in Pilibhit. The craftsmen were used to source its bamboo from Barak Valley in Assam. Earlier, there was an unbroken narrow-gauge line running from Silchar, in Assam, via Bihar, and into Pilibhit. On this line, 60-strong bundles of bamboo, each stalk 10 ft long, used to make their way to Pilibhit, but around 15 years ago, sections of that line were removed. Now, the bamboo has to travel on the narrow gauge from Silchar to Jiribum, then shift onto a broad-gauge line to travel to Bareilly, the nearest big town, and then reloaded onto narrow gauge to come into Pilibhit.

== Communication and media ==
Pilibhit has one local Radio Station (Akashwani) at 100.1 MHz but it also receives Bareilly's FM signals of following Radio providers:

Service Provider	Frequency
All India Radio	100.4 MHz
Big FM	92.7 MHz
Radio Mantra	91.9 MHz

Print media

The Hindi daily newspapers include Dainik Jagran, Amar Ujala, and The Hindustan. Prominent English dailies like The Times of India, The Hindustan Times and Indian Express have fewer readers. Among lesser-known Hindi papers are Swatantra Bharat, Rashtriya Sahara, and Jansatta. The Hindi newspapers Dainik Jagran and Amar Ujala have their offices in the city.

== Civic administration ==
The Pilibhit Nagar Palika Parishad (PNPP) is the largest municipal board in the Pilibhit district, in charge of the civic and infrastructural assets of the city of Pilibhit. This municipal board was established in 1865.

== Bibliography ==
- Kanjilal, P. C. (1933). "A Forest Flora for Pilibhit, Oudh, Gorakhpur, and Bundelkhand". A Brief Account of Climate and Forest (5 ed.). Narendra Pub. House.
- Basil Leonard Clyde Johnson, P (1979). India,: Resources and Development (6 ed.). Heinemann Educational Books. ISBN 0-06-493348-2.
- Govt. of Uttar Pradesh, P (1959). "Uttar Pradesh District Gazetteers". Uttar Pradesh District Gazetteers Volume Xxxvii Lucknow (2 ed.). Govt. of Uttar Pradesh.
- Neale, Walter C. (1962). "Economic Change in Rural India: Land Tenure and Reform in Uttar Pradesh:1800–1955". Yale Study of Economics (1 ed.). Yale University Press.
- Klein, Ira (1974). "Population and Agriculture in Northern India, 1872–1921". Modern Asian Studies. 8 (2). Cambridge University Press: 191–216. doi:10.1017/S0026749X0000545X.
