= Pilibhit district =

Coordinates: 28°37′36″N 79°48′21″E

- Districts of Uttar Pradesh
- Gauri-Shankar Temple in Pilibhit
- Pilibhit District In Uttar Pradesh
- Country: India
- State: Uttar Pradesh
- Headquarters: Pilibhit
- Division: Bareilly
- Region: Rohilkhand
- Tehsil: Pilibhit; Puranpur; Kalinagar; Bisalpur; Amaria

Government
  - Lok Sabha constituencies: Pilibhit (Lok Sabha constituency)
  - Vidhan Sabha constituencies: Pilibhit; Barkhera; Puranpur; Bisalpur

Area
  - Total: 3,504 km^{2} (1,353 sq mi)
- Elevation: 172 m (564 ft)

Population (2025)
  - Total: 2,570,000
  - Density: 733/km^{2} (1,900/sq mi)

Languages
  - Official: Hindi
- Time zone: UTC+5:30 (IST)
- PIN: 262001
- Telephone code: 05881, 05882
- Vehicle registration: UP-26
- Sex ratio: 889 ♂/♀
- Precipitation: 780 millimetres (31 in)
- Avg. summer temperature: 36.8 °C (98.2 °F)
- Avg. winter temperature: 14.5 °C (58.1 °F)
- Website: www.pilibhit.nic.in

Pilibhit district (Hindi pronunciation: [piːliːbʱiːt̪]) is one of the 75 districts in the state of Uttar Pradesh in India, and Pilibhit city is the district headquarters. Pilibhit district is a part of Bareilly Division. In June 2014, Pilibhit Tiger Reserve was announced as the 46th tiger reserve of India.

Pilibhit_tiger_reserve_2

== History ==
Pilibhit district had its origins as a subdivision of Bareilly district in 1871, consisting of the parganas of Jahanabad, Pilibhit, and Puranpur, with a magistrate based in Pilibhit. It was then officially upgraded to a separate district in November 1879.

The early history of Pilibhit district is obscure. This area is traditionally considered to have formed part of the Panchala kingdom, whose capital was at Ahichchhatra, although there are no historical documents to confirm this. On the other hand, the many ruin sites in the district indicate that there was extensive settlement here, and that the forests which historically covered the area used to be smaller.

=== Archaeological sites ===
At Neoria Husainpur is a large area of ruins that became covered by dense forest. Mahof has a large ruined brick fort; Simaria Ghosu, not far away, has a mud fort, but it appears to have been built later than other ruins in the area. Several octagonal wells and a large masonry tank at Khaj appear to be the remains of a large town. Perhaps the most important ruins in the district are at Balai Khera, close to the town of Jahanabad. Nearby to the west is a mound called Parasua-kot, which is from the same time as Balai Khera.

There are many ruins in the forests of Puranpur tehsil, often marked by "unusually large bricks, often carved and chiselled in a most artistic manner." The ruins at Dhanaura have been partly washed away by the Chauka, but there are still several large ruin-covered mounds here, over a large area. Another site is at Suapara, a short distance north of Puranpur. The massive fortress at Shahgarh appears to have been occupied during a fairly late period, since coins of the Varmmas of Nepal have been found inside its walls. Further south is a large unnamed site where fragments of pottery, bricks, and glazed tiles have been found.

In the Bisalpur tehsil, there are extensive ruins at Marauri, on the Khanaut, and at Barkhera in the north there is a large mound that is traditionally said to mark the spot of a city built by the legendary Raja Vena.

=== Dewal inscription ===
The 10th-century Dewal inscription, which was found in 1829 at the village of Ilahabad, also known as Ilahabas Dewal, near Deoria. It is a Sanskrit inscription, dated to year 1049 of the Vikram Samvat (992 or 993 CE) and written in the so-called kutila script. The entire inscription is written as a 37-stanza poem, full of metaphors and mythological allusions, and documenting the construction of two temples to Shiva and Parvati by a local ruler and his wife. It was composed by a man named Nahila, son of Sivarudra, who was evidently well-versed in Sanskrit grammar and rhetoric.

The ruler mentioned in the inscription, Lalla of the Chhinda family, is described as a mandala-putra, or ruler of a province, and he was probably a feudatory of the kings of Kannauj. The text says that he "brought the river Katha to his capital", which according to H.R. Nevill probably refers to the digging of the canal now called the Katni. It also says that Lalla had the two temples built and endowed them with a quarter of the revenue from several villages. He gave the site the name "Devapalli", which is probably the same as "Dewal". The site of Garha Khera, a large 800-square-foot mound with two small tanks, was probably Lalla's capital; the Katni winds its way around this site. Atop a large mound on the south side of Ilahabad are the remains of a large temple, which is where the Dewal inscription was found.

=== Medieval through Early Modern ===
Whatever happened in the area after the time of the Dewal inscription is unknown. It is completely absent from contemporary sources for several centuries. The Muslim conquerors appear to have had no interest in the region, which may have been densely forested around this time. The first reference to Pilibhit is possibly in 1256, when the Delhi Sultan Nasir-ud-Din Muhammad led troops to Awadh by way of "Tilibhat". Pilibhit may also be the "Talpat" mentioned during the reign of Sultan Ghiyas-ud-Din Balban.

The Katehria Rajputs came to rule over the Pilibhit area at some point. Tradition holds that their leader Kharag Singh conquered the western part of this district from the local tribes. From this base, the Katehrias were only nominally subjects of the Sultans of Delhi. In 1379, after Kharag Singh murdered the governor of Budaun, Firoz Shah led a scorched-earth campaign in the region, causing widespread destruction and resulting in the entire area between Budaun and Bilaspur becoming a hunting ground.

During Akbar's reign, the area of today's Pilibhit district was a remote backwater. In the Ain-i-Akbari, the area included the parganas of Balai and Punar, and Bareilly, with a small part possibly belonging to Gola in today's Shahjahanpur district. Balai was based at what is now called Balai Khera, and Punar was the old name of Puranpur. These parganas were all nominally part of the sarkar of Budaun, but in practice they were under the governors of Bareilly. During this period, Pilibhit district's history is essentially the same as Bareilly district's, with nothing to set it apart.

=== Modern times ===
During the freedom struggle, the rural folks showed bravery. One freedom fighter Shri Bhadain Lal, of Rampur Amrit near Bilsanda towwn who killed a British police inspector. He was jailed & imprisoned at Lalitpur Central Jail. The Britishers during the freedom struggle were chased out. They were given shelter by a few villagers at Mankapur. The Britishers in return offered them Land & Gardens near banks of Khannout river. In 191-72 the Nanakmatta dam leaked & flooded the Deoha river. Many people died as the flood has taken place in odd hours.

== Pilibhit Tiger Reserve ==
Pilibhit Tiger Reserve is a tiger reserve located in Pilibhit district of Uttar Pradesh, which was notified as a tiger reserve in 2014. It forms part of the Terai Arc Landscape in the upper Gangetic Plain along the India-Nepal border. The habitat is characterised by sal forests, tall grasslands and swamp maintained by periodic flooding from rivers. The Sharda Sagar Dam extending up to a length of 22 km (14 mi) is on the boundary of the reserve.

Pilibhit is one of the few well-forested districts in Uttar Pradesh. According to an estimate of the year 2018, Pilibhit district has over 800 km^{2} (310 sq mi) forests, constituting roughly 23% of the district’s total area. Forests in Pilibhit have at least 65 tiger and a prey including five species of deer. The tiger reserve got the first International award TX2 for doubling the tiger population in a stipulated time.

== Demographics ==
Historical population
Year	Pop.	±% p.a.
1901	498,706	—
1911	516,699	+0.36%
1921	457,437	−1.21%
1931	476,160	+0.40%
1941	520,411	+0.89%
1951	534,755	+0.27%
1961	652,494	+2.01%
1971	791,019	+1.94%
1981	1,059,559	+2.97%
1991	1,344,848	+2.41%
2001	1,728,108	+2.54%
2011	2,031,007	+1.63%

Languages of Pilibhit district (2011)
1. Hindi (83.0%)
2. Urdu (8.99%)
3. Punjabi (3.72%)
4. Bengali (3.05%)
5. Bhojpuri (1.13%)
6. Others (0.08%)

Religions in Pilibhit district (2011)
Religion	Percent
Hinduism	71.34%
Islam	24.11%
Sikhism	4.17%
Other or not stated	0.38%
Distribution of religions

According to the 2011 census Pilibhit district has a population of 2,031,007, roughly equal to the nation of Slovenia or the US state of New Mexico. This gives it a ranking of 226th in India (out of a total of 640). The district has a population density of 567 inhabitants per square kilometre (1,470/sq mi) . Its population growth rate over the decade 2001-2011 was 23.83%. Pilibhit has a sex ratio of 889 females for every 1000 males, and a literacy rate of 63.58%. 17.30% of the population lives in urban areas. Scheduled Castes and Scheduled Tribes make up 16.42% and 0.08% of the population respectively.

At the time of the 2011 Census of India, 83.03% of the population in the district spoke Hindi, 8.99% Urdu, 3.72% Punjabi, 3.05% Bengali and 1.13% Bhojpuri as their first language.

== Tourist attractions ==
- Chuka Beach
- Bifurcation Point
- Bhiramchari Ghaat

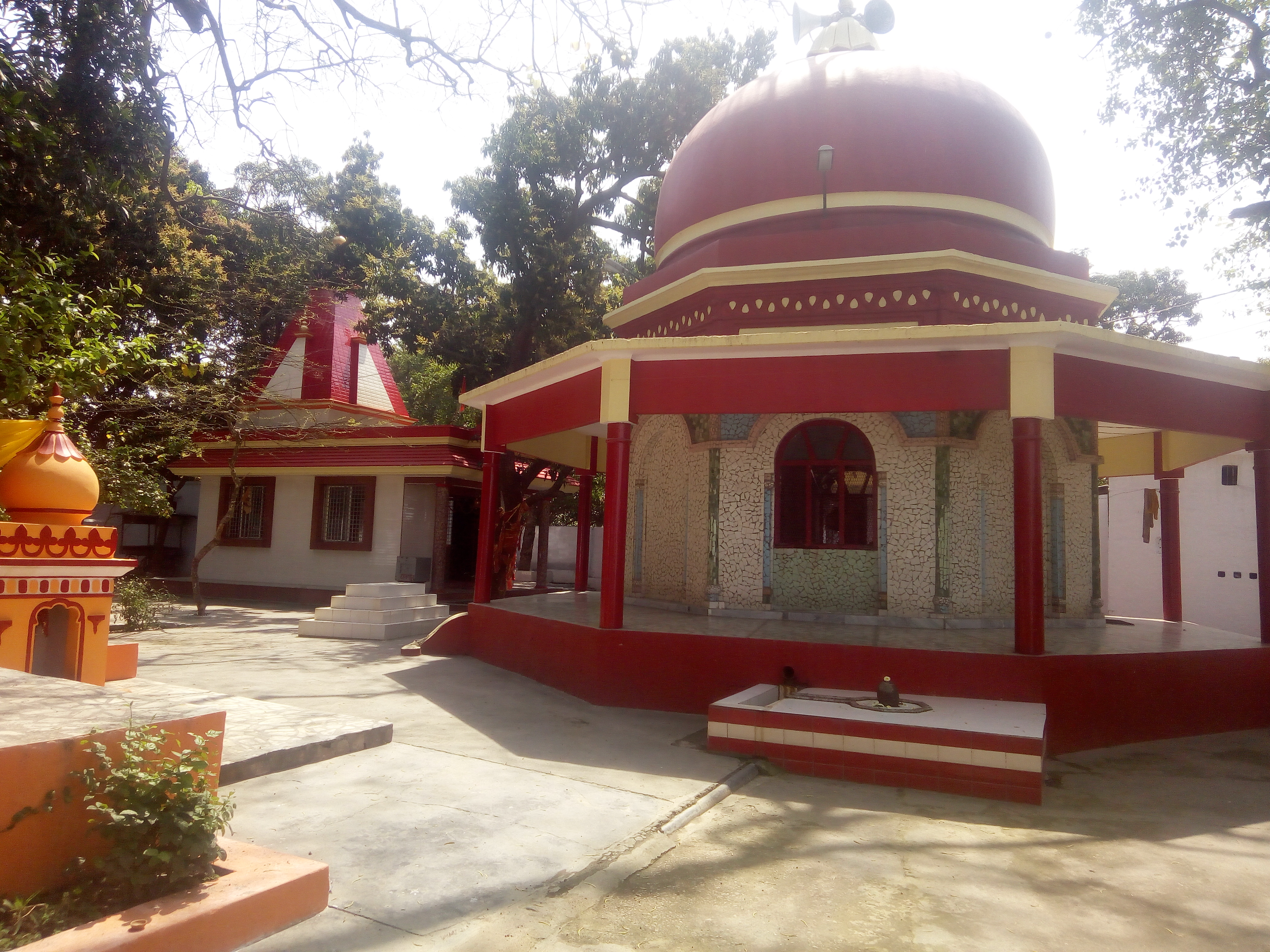
Bhiramchari Ghaat।

- Gauri Shankar Temple
- Yashvantri Temple
- Jama Masjid Pilibhit

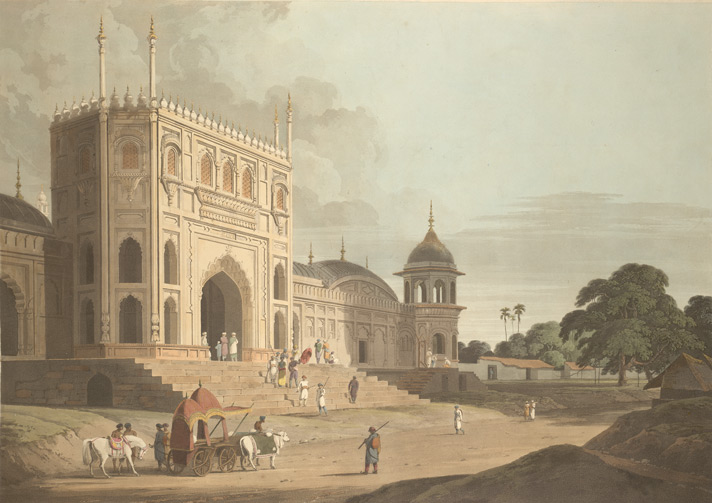
Jama Masjid Pilibhit in the 1780s

- Dargah Shahji Mohammad Sher Miya

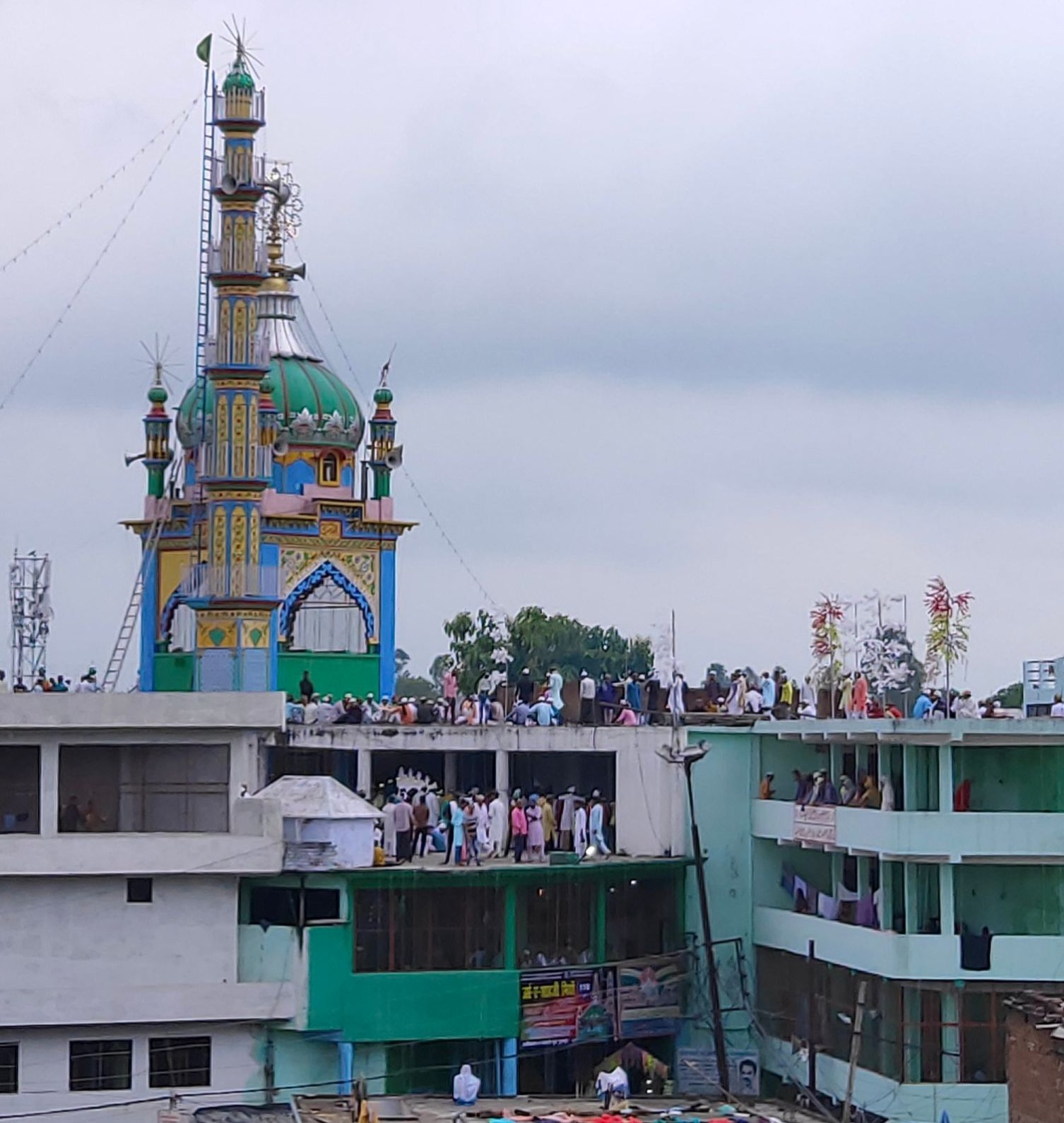

== Transportation ==
=== Airport ===
Bareilly Airport is a nearest airport to Pilibhit Tiger Reserve and Pilibhit and this airport is located around 43 km from Pilibhit. Bareilly Airport is connected to cities like Mumbai, New Delhi and Bengaluru with direct flights.

=== Railway Station ===
- Pilibhit Junction railway station
- Neoria Hussainpur Railway Station
- Puranpur railway station
- Bisalpur Railway Station
- Bhopatpur Railway Station
- Majhola Railway Station
- Shahi Railway Station

=== UPSRTC Bus Stand ===
- Pilibhit UPSRTC Bus Depot
- Puranpur Bus Stand
- Bisalpur Bus Stand
- Amaria Bus Stand

== Towns ==
- Amaria
- Barkhera
- Bilsanda
- Bisalpur
- Jahanabad
- Kalinagar
- Madhotanda
- Nyoria Husainpur
- Puranpur
- Majhola

== Notable people ==
- Md Shamsul Hasan Khan
- Mukund Lal Agrawal
- Mohan Swarup
- Sanjay Singh Gangwar
- Simranjeet Singh (Hockey Player)
- Riyaz Ahmad (Ex Minister)
- Nalneesh Neel
- Peetam Ram
- Gopal Krishna Saxena
- Agys Ramsaran Verma
- Hemraj Verma
- Vivek Kumar Verma
- Harish Kumar Gangawar
- Bhanu Pratap Singh
- Parshuram Gangwar
- Vivek Kumar Verma

== Figures about Pilibhit District ==
Total Area District - 3504 km^{2}
Total Area city - 68.76 km^{2}

Population (as 2011)

Type	No.
Male	1,078,525
Female	958,700
Total	2,037,225
Rural	14,26,057
Urban	611,167
SC	2,89,235
ST	2156

== See also ==
- Sikh masacre in Pilibhit forest, Sikh masacre at Pilibhit tiger reserve, 1991
- Pilibhit Lok Sabha constituency
- Pilibhit Tiger Reserve
