= Pilibhit Lok Sabha constituency =

Constituency of the Indian parliament in the state of Uttar Pradesh

Coordinates: 28°37′36″N 79°48′21″E

Pilibhit UP-26
- Lok Sabha constituency

Constituency details
- Country: India
- Region: North India
- State: Uttar Pradesh
- Assembly constituencies: Baheri; Pilibhit; Barkhera; Puranpur; Bisalpur
- Established: 1952-present
- Total electors: 18,31,699
- Reservation: None

Member of Parliament
- 18th Lok Sabha
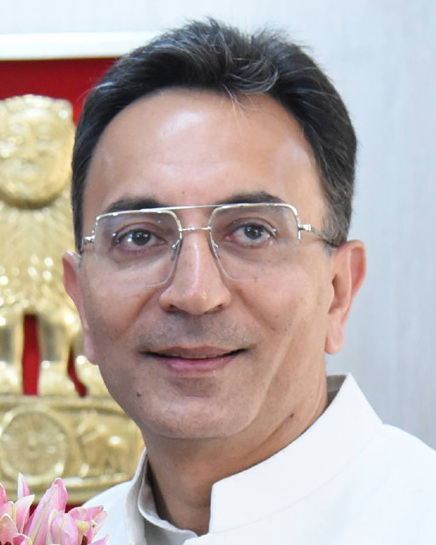
- Incumbent Jitin Prasada
- Party: BJP
- Alliance: NDA
- Elected year: 2024
- Preceded by: Feroze Varun Gandhi

Pilibhit Lok Sabha constituency is one of the 80 parliamentary constituencies to elect a member to the Lok Sabha, the lower house of India's Parliament. It is situated in the north-eastern part of Uttar Pradesh. The constituency has been represented by various prominent leaders over the years, including Menaka Gandhi and Feroze Varun Gandhi. The political landscape here often reflects the broader trends in Uttar Pradesh, a key state in Indian politics. The constituency has a mix of urban (17.7%) and rural electors (82.3%). (Note: Including 16% SC and 0.1% ST electors.) Agriculture is a significant part of the local economy, with many residents engaged in farming and related activities. Pilibhit is known for its natural beauty and wildlife, including the Pilibhit Tiger Reserve. The constituency plays a crucial role in the political dynamics of Uttar Pradesh and has been a focus for various political parties over the elections. The Pilibhit Lok Sabha constituency was created in 1951 under the Delimitation Act. After that the first ever democratic election happened in Pilibhit Lok Sabha constituency. Later, The Delimitation Commission of India again redefined the Pilibhit constituency by adding Baheri Assembly constituency and moving Powayan Assembly constituency under Shahjahanpur Lok Sabha constituency in 2008. Pilibhit constituency witnessed the highest number of contestants (total 40 including 35 non-partisan candidates) in the 1996 election and the lowest number of contestants (total 3 candidates) in the 1957 election. Pilibhit is the only constituency in the history of the Lok Sabha which elected the same female parliamentarian for six terms.

== Assembly segments ==
The following assembly seats come under Pilibhit Lok Sabha constituency as per the delimitation of the parliamentary constituencies in 2008.

| Assembly seat no. | Assembly seat name | District | Member of assembly | Party |
|---|---|---|---|---|
| 118 | Baheri | Bareilly | Ataur Rehman | Samajwadi Party |
| 127 | Pilibhit | Pilibhit | Sanjay Singh Gangwar | Bharatiya Janata Party |
| 128 | Barkhera | Pilibhit | Swami Pravaktanand | Bharatiya Janata Party |
| 129 | Puranpur (SC) | Pilibhit | Baburam Paswan | Bharatiya Janata Party |
| 130 | Bisalpur | Pilibhit | Vivek Kumar Verma | Bharatiya Janata Party |

(Source: Election Commission of India)

== Members of Parliament ==
| Election year | Winning candidate | Winning party |
|---|---|---|
| 1952 | Mukund Lal Agrawal | Indian National Congress |
| 1957 | Mohan Swarup | Praja Socialist Party |
| 1962 | Mohan Swarup | Praja Socialist Party |
| 1967 | Mohan Swarup | Praja Socialist Party |
| 1971 | Mohan Swarup | Indian National Congress |
| 1977 | Md Shamsul Hasan Khan | Janata Party |
| 1980 | Harish Kumar Gangawar | Indian National Congress |
| 1984 | Bhanu Pratap Singh | Indian National Congress |
| 1989 | Maneka Gandhi | Janata Dal |
| 1991 | Parshuram Gangwar | Bharatiya Janata Party |
| 1996 | Maneka Gandhi | Janata Dal |
| 1998 | Maneka Gandhi | Independent |
| 1999 | Maneka Gandhi | Independent |
| 2004 | Maneka Gandhi | Bharatiya Janata Party |
| 2009 | Feroze Varun Gandhi | Bharatiya Janata Party |
| 2014 | Maneka Gandhi | Bharatiya Janata Party |
| 2019 | Feroze Varun Gandhi | Bharatiya Janata Party |
| 2024 | Jitin Prasada | Bharatiya Janata Party |

(Source: Election Commission of India)

== Parliamentary election results ==
=== 2024 Indian general election ===
2024 Indian general election: Pilibhit
| Party | Candidate | Votes | % | ±% |
|---|---|---|---|---|
| BJP | Jitin Prasada | 607,158 | 52.30 | ▼7.08 |
| SP | Bhagwat Saran Gangwar | 442,223 | 38.09 | ▲0.26 |
| BSP | Anis Ahmed Khan | 89,697 | 7.73 | ▲7.73 |
| NOTA | None of the Above | 6,741 | 0.58 | ▼0.26 |
| Bhartiya Krishak Dal | Rajeev Kumar Saxena | 3,809 | 0.33 | ▲7.73 |
| Independent | Sushil Kumar Shukla | 2,727 | 0.23 | ▲0.23 |
| Independent | Mohammad Shahid Husain | 1,846 | 0.16 | ▲0.16 |
| Independent | Ashish Kumar | 1,850 | 0.16 | ▲0.16 |
| Independent | Adarsh Pandey | 1,726 | 0.15 | ▲0.09 |
| Rashtriya Samaj Dal | Sanjay Kumar Bharti | 1,631 | 0.14 | ▲0.14 |
| Independent | Pramod Patel | 1,539 | 0.13 | ▲0.13 |
| Majority | | 1,64,935 | 14.21 | ▼7.34 |
| Turnout | | 1,160,947 | 63.11 | ▼4.3 |
| Registered electors | | 1,839,561 | | ▲4.25 |
| BJP hold | | Swing | ▼7.08 | |

(Source: Election Commission of India)

=== 2019 Indian general election ===
2019 Indian general elections: Pilibhit
| Party | Candidate | Votes | % | ±% |
|---|---|---|---|---|
| BJP | Feroze Varun Gandhi | 704,549 | 59.38 | ▲7.32 |
| SP | Hemraj Verma | 448,922 | 37.83 | ▲15.00 |
| NOTA | None of the Above | 9,973 | 0.84 | ▼0.26 |
| Independent | Varun Gandhi | 4,483 | 0.38 | ▲0.38 |
| Independent | Surendra Kumar Gupta | 4,442 | 0.37 | ▲0.37 |
| SS | Anita Tripati | 3,974 | 0.30 | ▲0.30 |
| Independent | Munesh singh | 2,129 | 0.18 | ▼0.41 |
| Independent | Jafri Begum | 1,633 | 0.14 | ▲0.14 |
| JD | Dr. Bharat | 1,624 | 0.14 | ▲0.14 |
| Pragatishil Party | Mohammad Hanif | 1,276 | 0.11 | ▲0.11 |
| Sabka Dal United | Dr. Sita Ram Rajput | 1,098 | 0.09 | ▲0.09 |
| Independent | Kaif Raza Khan | 926 | 0.08 | ▲0.08 |
| Independent | Urvashi Singh | 864 | 0.07 | ▲0.07 |
| Naitik Party | Sanjay Kumar Bharti | 696 | 0.06 | ▼44.6 |
| Majority | | 255,627 | 21.55 | ▼7.68 |
| Turnout | | 1,187,225 | 67.41 | ▲4.55 |
| Registered electors | | 1,761,207 | | ▲5.11 |
| BJP hold | | Swing | ▲7.32 | |

(Source: Election Commission of India)

=== 2014 Indian general election ===
2014 Indian general elections: Pilibhit
| Party | Candidate | Votes | % | ±% |
|---|---|---|---|---|
| BJP | Maneka Gandhi | 546,934 | 52.06 | ▲1.97 |
| SP | Budhsen Verma | 239,882 | 22.83 | ▲8.75 |
| BSP | Anis Ahmad Khan | 196,294 | 18.68 | ▲5.24 |
| INC | Sanjay Kapoor | 29,169 | 2.78 | ▼13.70 |
| NOTA | None of the Above | 11,521 | 1.10 | ▲1.10 |
| Independent | Munesh Singh | 6,151 | 0.59 | ▲0.59 |
| AAP | Rajeev Agarwal | 5,547 | 0.50 | ▲0.50 |
| CPI(ML)L | Ram Autar | 3,187 | 0.36 | ▲0.36 |
| Independent | Ravindra Kumar Devnath | 3,145 | 0.34 | ▲0.34 |
| PECP | Nilima Sharma | 2,670 | 0.31 | ▲0.31 |
| Independent | Mohd Naeem Ansari | 2,617 | 0.30 | ▲0.30 |
| Independent | Arman Khan | 2,170 | 0.27 | ▲0.27 |
| Naitik Party | Sanjay Kumar Bharti | 1,260 | 0.14 | ▲0.14 |
| Majority | | 307,052 | 29.23 | ▼4.38 |
| Turnout | | 1,050,568 | 62.86 | ▼1.08 |
| Registered electors | | 1,671,154 | | ▲21.61 |
| BJP hold | | Swing | ▲1.97 | |

(Source: Election Commission of India)

=== 2009 Indian general election ===
2009 Indian general elections: Pilibhit
| Party | Candidate | Votes | % | ±% |
|---|---|---|---|---|
| BJP | Feroze Varun Gandhi | 419,539 | 50.09 | ▲12.34 |
| INC | V. M. Singh | 138,038 | 16.48 | ▲0.80 |
| SP | Riyaz Ahmad | 117,903 | 14.08 | ▼8.50 |
| BSP | Ganga Charan | 112,576 | 13.44 | ▼4.47 |
| Independent | Ram Narayan Singh | 14,246 | 1.70 | ▲1.70 |
| Independent | Viquarul Hasan Khan | 10,777 | 1.29 | ▲1.29 |
| NCP | Chotey Lal Gangwar | 4,963 | 0.59 | ▲0.59 |
| CPI(ML)L | Krishna Adhikari | 3,563 | 0.43 | ▼1.31 |
| AD | Indra Pal | 3,541 | 0.42 | ▼0.05 |
| Independent | Mahesh Saxena | 2,912 | 0.35 | ▲0.35 |
| Independent | Lalta Prasad | 2,840 | 0.34 | ▲0.34 |
| Independent | Mahavir Singh | 1,913 | 0.23 | ▼0.05 |
| Independent | Harish Kumar | 1,605 | 0.19 | ▲0.19 |
| Independent | Harpal Singh | 1,147 | 0.14 | ▲0.14 |
| Independent | Jamuna Devi | 1,137 | 0.14 | ▲0.14 |
| Independent | Ram Kumar Arya | 877 | 0.10 | ▼0.08 |
| Majority | | 281,501 | 33.61 | ▲18.44 |
| Turnout | | 837,577 | 63.94 | ▲11.28 |
| Registered electors | | 1,310,007 | | ▲4.91 |
| BJP hold | | Swing | ▲12.34 | |

(Source: Election Commission of India)

=== 2004 Indian general election ===
2004 Indian general elections: Pilibhit
| Party | Candidate | Votes | % | ±% |
|---|---|---|---|---|
| BJP | Maneka Gandhi | 255,615 | 37.75 | ▼20.19 |
| SP | Satyapal Gangwar | 152,895 | 22.58 | ▲9.50 |
| BSP | Anis Ahmed Khan | 121,269 | 17.91 | ▲7.69 |
| INC | V. M. Singh | 106,186 | 15.68 | ▲14.11 |
| CPI(ML)L | Krishna Adhikari | 11,804 | 1.74 | ▲1.33 |
| Independent | Motiram Rajput | 11,027 | 1.63 | ▲1.63 |
| Independent | Mahendra Singh | 4,967 | 0.73 | ▲0.23 |
| AD | Satendra | 3,194 | 0.47 | ▲0.47 |
| Independent | Babu Ram | 2,272 | 0.36 | ▲0.36 |
| Independent | Paramjeet Sharma | 2,203 | 0.32 | ▲0.32 |
| Independent | Kulbinder Singh | 2030 | 0.29 | ▲0.29 |
| Independent | Puranlal | 1,363 | 0.20 | ▲0.20 |
| Akhil Rajarya Sabha | Mahavir Singh | 1,251 | 0.17 | ▲0.17 |
| Ekta Kranti Dal | Manohar Lal | 1,031 | 0.14 | ▲0.14 |
| Majority | | 102,720 | 15.17 | ▼15.12 |
| Turnout | | 677,107 | 52.66 | ▼10.28 |
| Registered electors | | 1,245,678 | | ▲8.54 |
| BJP gain from Independent | | Swing | ▼20.19 | |

(Source: Election Commission of India)

=== 1999 Indian general election ===
1999 Indian general election: Pilibhit
| Party | Candidate | Votes | % | ±% |
|---|---|---|---|---|
| Independent | Maneka Gandhi | 433,421 | 57.94 | ▲1.95 |
| BSP | Anis Ahmad Khan | 193,566 | 25.88 | ▲0.28 |
| SP | Ram Saran Verma | 58,792 | 7.86 | ▼5.22 |
| INC | Raj Rai Singh | 50,086 | 6.70 | ▲5.13 |
| AD | Chhatrapal Patel | 2,680 | 0.36 | ▲0.36 |
| Independent | Umaruddin Khan | 1,474 | 0.20 | ▲0.20 |
| Independent | Ravi Shankar | 1,345 | 0.18 | ▲0.18 |
| Independent | Rajeshwari | 367 | 0.18 | ▼0.17 |
| Majority | | 239,855 | 32.06 | ▲2.01 |
| Turnout | | 748,004 | 65.66 | ▲3.28 |
| Registered electors | | 1,139,217 | | ▲0.81 |
| Independent hold | | Swing | ▲1.95 | |

(Source: Election Commission of India)

=== 1998 Indian general election ===
1998 Indian general election: Pilibhit
| Party | Candidate | Votes | % | ±% |
|---|---|---|---|---|
| Independent | Maneka Gandhi | 390,381 | 55.99 | ▼4.16 |
| BSP | Anis Ahmed Khan | 178,505 | 25.60 | ▲12.18 |
| SP | Parushram | 91,177 | 13.08 | ▲11.92 |
| INC | Roop Kishore | 10,922 | 1.57 | ▼1.12 |
| JD | Riyaz Ahmad | 8,572 | 1.23 | ▼58.77 |
| CPI(ML)L | Krishna Adhikari | 5,147 | 0.47 | ▼0.10 |
| Independent | Mahavir Singh | 3,457 | 0.50 | ▲0.31 |
| Independent | Anil Kumar | 2,562 | 0.37 | ▲0.37 |
| Independent | Rajeshwari | 2,412 | 0.35 | ▲0.35 |
| Independent | Hardwari | 2,010 | 0.29 | ▲0.29 |
| Independent | Shanti Swaroop | 1,123 | 0.16 | ▲0.16 |
| Independent | Gyanendra Kumar | 690 | 0.10 | ▲0.10 |
| Independent | Abdul Mabood | 245 | 0.04 | ▲0.04 |
| Majority | | 211,876 | 30.39 | ▼12.43 |
| Turnout | | 704,856 | 62.38 | ▲2.50 |
| Registered electors | | 1,129,987 | | ▲2.47 |
| Independent gain from JD | | Swing | ▼4.16 | |

(Source: Election Commission of India)

=== 1996 Indian general election ===
1996 Indian general election: Pilibhit
| Party | Candidate | Votes | % | ±% |
|---|---|---|---|---|
| JD | Maneka Gandhi | 395,827 | 59.83 | ▲30.83 |
| BJP | Parshuram Gangwar | 112,517 | 17.01 | ▼13.85 |
| BSP | Riyaz Ahmad | 88,750 | 13.42 | ▲9.78 |
| INC | Babu Taj bahadur | 17,815 | 2.69 | ▼13.44 |
| Independent | Sundar Lal | 11,707 | 1.77 | ▲1.77 |
| CPI(ML)L | Krishna Adhikari | 3,764 | 0.57 | ▲0.57 |
| Independent | Ramesh Kumar | 2,958 | 0.45 | ▲0.45 |
| Independent | Munne Khan | 2,753 | 0.42 | ▲0.42 |
| Independent | Prasadi Lal | 2,505 | 0.38 | ▲0.38 |
| Independent | Mahavir Singh | 1,906 | 0.29 | ▲0.29 |
| Independent | Munshi Lal | 1,885 | 0.28 | ▲0.28 |
| Independent | Ram Pratap | 1,823 | 0.28 | ▲0.28 |
| Independent | Vikarul Hasan | 1,580 | 0.24 | ▲0.24 |
| Independent | Omdev | 1,086 | 0.16 | ▲0.16 |
| Independent | Rajiv | 947 | 0.14 | ▲0.14 |
| Independent | Uttam Pal | 847 | 0.13 | ▲0.13 |
| Independent | Ram Krishna | 845 | 0.13 | ▲0.13 |
| Independent | Hafiz Ahmed | 805 | 0.12 | ▲0.12 |
| Independent | Lalta Prasad | 799 | 0.12 | ▲0.12 |
| Independent | Ram Asarey | 792 | 0.12 | ▲0.12 |
| Independent | Lalaram | 630 | 0.10 | ▲0.10 |
| Independent | Umesh Chander | 538 | 0.08 | ▲0.08 |
| Independent | Rajesh | 537 | 0.08 | ▲0.08 |
| Independent | Hari Swarup | 523 | 0.08 | ▲0.08 |
| Independent | Nathulal | 476 | 0.07 | ▲0.07 |
| Independent | Sukhdev Singh | 423 | 0.06 | ▲0.04 |
| Independent | Inamul Huk | 414 | 0.06 | ▲0.04 |
| Independent | Ram Chander | 401 | 0.06 | ▲0.04 |
| Independent | Satinder | 392 | 0.06 | ▲0.06 |
| Independent | Kishan Chand | 294 | 0.04 | ▲0.04 |
| Independent | Ram Pal | 287 | 0.04 | ▲0.04 |
| Independent | Ramgopal | 259 | 0.04 | ▲0.04 |
| Independent | Guruvir Singh Chhabra | 196 | 0.03 | ▲0.03 |
| Independent | Shri Pal Shrivastava | 195 | 0.03 | ▲0.03 |
| Independent | Abdul Mabood Chaudhary | 178 | 0.03 | ▲0.03 |
| Independent | Arjun | 169 | 0.03 | ▲0.03 |
| Independent | Abdul Rahman | 163 | 0.02 | ▲0.02 |
| Independent | Jakir Husain | 106 | 0.02 | ▲0.02 |
| Independent | Chander Mohan Mahajan | 83 | 0.01 | ▲0.01 |
| Majority | | 283,310 | 42.82 | ▲41.36 |
| Turnout | | 673,796 | 60.88 | ▲6.4 |
| Registered electors | | 1,106,846 | | ▲16.89 |
| JD gain from BJP | | Swing | ▲59.83 | |

(Source: Election Commission of India)

=== 1991 Indian general election ===
1991 Indian general election: Pilibhit
| Party | Candidate | Votes | % | ±% |
|---|---|---|---|---|
| BJP | Parshuram Gangwar | 146,633 | 30.86 | ▲30.86 |
| JP | Maneka Gandhi | 139,710 | 29.4 | ▲29.4 |
| INC | Manpal Singh | 76,654 | 16.13 | ▼13.24 |
| JD | Mahendra Singh | 52,253 | 11.0 | ▲11.0 |
| BSP | Hafiz Ahmad | 17,276 | 3.64 | ▲3.64 |
| Independent | Sushil | 5,145 | 1.08 | ▲1.08 |
| Independent | Babloo | 5,072 | 1.07 | ▲1.07 |
| DDP | Hari Om | 5,026 | 1.06 | ▼2.18 |
| Independent | Bhagwati Charan | 4,806 | 1.01 | ▲1.01 |
| Independent | Bhagwan Das | 3,073 | 0.65 | ▲0.65 |
| Independent | Mohd. Iqbal | 2,182 | 0.46 | ▲0.46 |
| Jan Parishad | Suresh Chandra | 2,180 | 0.46 | ▲0.46 |
| Independent | Chhail Bihari | 2,063 | 0.43 | ▲0.43 |
| Independent | Dori Lal | 1,944 | 0.41 | ▲0.41 |
| Independent | Punam Misra | 1,716 | 0.36 | ▲0.36 |
| Independent | Pyarey Lal | 1,704 | 0.36 | ▲0.36 |
| Independent | Zakir Husain Khan | 1,506 | 0.32 | ▲0.32 |
| Independent | Chandra Mohan | 1,147 | 0.24 | ▲0.24 |
| ABHM | Brijendra Singh | 1,022 | 0.22 | ▲0.22 |
| Independent | Kishan Chandra | 916 | 0.19 | ▲0.19 |
| Independent | Bhagwan Singh | 823 | 0.17 | ▲0.17 |
| Independent | Ram Bahadur | 787 | 0.17 | ▲0.17 |
| Independent | Abdul Mabood Chaudhari | 738 | 0.16 | ▲0.16 |
| Independent | Mohd. Hasan | 509 | 0.11 | ▲0.11 |
| Independent | Ajay Kumar | 298 | 0.06 | ▲0.06 |
| Majority | | 6,923 | 1.46 | ▼26.68 |
| Turnout | | 501,130 | 54.48 | ▼0.09 |
| Registered electors | | 919,807 | | ▲1.39 |
| BJP gain from JD | | Swing | ▲30.86 | |

(Source: Election Commission of India)

=== 1989 Indian general election ===
1989 Indian general election: Pilibhit
| Party | Candidate | Votes | % | ±% |
|---|---|---|---|---|
| JD | Maneka Gandhi | 269,044 | 57.34 | ▲57.34 |
| INC | Bhanu Pratap Singh | 137,824 | 29.37 | ▼34.47 |
| Independent | Hazari Lal | 153,06 | 3.26 | ▲3.26 |
| DDP | Baboo Ram | 15,199 | 3.24 | ▼0.55 |
| Independent | Suresh Chandra | 9,489 | 2.02 | ▲2.02 |
| Independent | Harjindra Singh | 8,216 | 1.75 | ▲1.75 |
| Independent | Har Prasad Gangwar | 2,943 | 0.63 | ▲0.63 |
| Independent | Shiv Narain Lal | 1,542 | 0.33 | ▲0.33 |
| Independent | Ram Murti Lal | 1,540 | 0.33 | ▲0.33 |
| Independent | Sher Singh | 1,443 | 0.31 | ▲0.31 |
| Independent | Vivek Singh Chauhan | 1,221 | 0.26 | ▲0.26 |
| Independent | S. Mohan Singh | 1,202 | 0.26 | ▲0.26 |
| Independent | Lal Bahadur | 951 | 0.20 | ▲0.20 |
| Independent | Jai Lal | 893 | 0.19 | ▲0.19 |
| Independent | Kishan Chand | 836 | 0.18 | ▲0.18 |
| Independent | Hari Shankar | 730 | 0.16 | ▲0.16 |
| Independent | Arvind Kumar Nagaich | 566 | 0.12 | ▲0.12 |
| Independent | Kaka Joginder Singh | 279 | 0.06 | ▲0.06 |
| Majority | | 131,220 | 27.97 | ▼12.48 |
| Turnout | | 495,090 | 54.39 | ▼8.50 |
| Registered electors | | 910,250 | | ▲21.7 |
| JD gain from INC | | Swing | ▲57.34 | |

(Source: Election Commission of India)

=== 1984 Indian general election ===
1984 Indian general election: Pilibhit
| Party | Candidate | Votes | % | ±% |
|---|---|---|---|---|
| INC | Bhanu Pratap Singh | 278,803 | 63.84 | ▲23.42 |
| Independent | Md Shamsul Hasan Khan | 102,133 | 23.39 | ▼1.95 |
| BJP | Braj Swaroop Mishra | 24,111 | 5.52 | ▲5.52 |
| DDP | Baboo Ram | 16,536 | 3.79 | ▲3.79 |
| LKD | Tauseef Raza | 4,094 | 0.94 | ▲0.94 |
| Independent | Ram Dutt Singh | 2,705 | 0.62 | ▲0.62 |
| Independent | Mohanlal Jatav | 2,556 | 0.59 | ▲0.59 |
| Independent | Chhotey Lal | 1,674 | 0.38 | ▲0.38 |
| Independent | Shanti Swaroop | 1,651 | 0.38 | ▲0.38 |
| Independent | Shamshul Hasain | 1,534 | 0.35 | ▲0.35 |
| Independent | Krishan Chandra Sheria | 897 | 0.21 | ▲0.21 |
| Majority | | 176,670 | 40.45 | ▲24.65 |
| Turnout | | 447,896 | 62.84 | ▲17.33 |
| Registered electors | | 712,701 | | ▲5.33 |
| INC hold | | Swing | ▲23.42 | |

(Source: Election Commission of India)

=== 1980 Indian general election ===
1980 Indian general election: Pilibhit
| Party | Candidate | Votes | % | ±% |
|---|---|---|---|---|
| INC | Harish Kumar Gangawar | 120,916 | 40.42 | ▲20.69 |
| JP | Md Shamsul Hasan Khan | 75,809 | 25.34 | ▼45.98 |
| JP(S) | Dammar Singh | 63,866 | 21.35 | ▲21.35 |
| Independent | Ganga Das | 9,840 | 3.29 | ▲3.29 |
| Independent | Ram Saran Lal Verma | 9,402 | 3.14 | ▲3.14 |
| INC(U) | Bhagwat Saran | 4,224 | 1.41 | ▲1.41 |
| Independent | Munni Lal Patel | 3,814 | 1.28 | ▲1.28 |
| Independent | Ram Swarup | 2,592 | 0.87 | ▲0.87 |
| Independent | Indra Dev | 2,119 | 0.71 | ▲0.71 |
| Independent | Satya Kar | 2,114 | 0.71 | ▲0.71 |
| Independent | Krishan Chandra Sheria | 1,455 | 0.49 | ▲0.49 |
| Independent | Satish Chandra Kashyap | 1,109 | 0.37 | ▼9.02 |
| Independent | Ram Swarup Gayadin | 965 | 0.32 | ▲0.32 |
| Independent | Ram Chandra | 906 | 0.30 | ▲0.30 |
| Majority | | 45,107 | 15.80 | ▼35.79 |
| Turnout | | 307,000 | 45.51 | ▼12.18 |
| Registered electors | | 674,646 | | ▲12.01 |
| INC gain from BLD | | Swing | ▲20.69 | |

(Source: Election Commission of India)

=== 1977 Indian general election ===
1977 Indian general election: Pilibhit
| Party | Candidate | Votes | % | ±% |
|---|---|---|---|---|
| JP | Md Shamsul Hasan Khan | 238,691 | 71.32 | ▲83.05 |
| INC | Mohan Swarup | 66,015 | 19.73 | ▼19.23 |
| Independent | Narain Lal | 9,392 | 2.81 | ▲2.81 |
| Independent | Perma Nand | 7,424 | 2.22 | ▲2.22 |
| Independent | Zahoor Khan | 6,504 | 1.94 | ▲1.94 |
| Independent | Abdul Rahim | 2,964 | 0.89 | ▲0.89 |
| Independent | Jalil-ul-rahman | 2,466 | 0.74 | ▲0.74 |
| Independent | Satish Chandra Kashyap | 1,219 | 0.36 | ▲0.36 |
| Majority | | 172,676 | 51.59 | ▲37.37 |
| Turnout | | 342,429 | 57.69 | ▲10.78 |
| Registered electors | | 593,586 | | ▲7.83 |
| BLD gain from INC | | Swing | ▲71.32 | |

(Source: Election Commission of India)

=== 1971 Indian general election ===
1971 Indian general election: Pilibhit
| Party | Candidate | Votes | % | ±% |
|---|---|---|---|---|
| INC | Mohan Swarup | 97,375 | 38.96 | ▲12.36 |
| INC(O) | Md Shamsul Hasan Khan | 61,845 | 24.74 | ▼7.51 |
| ABJS | Shambhoo Nath Agnihotri | 47,736 | 19.1 | ▼5.16 |
| BKD | Om Prakash | 19,863 | 7.95 | ▲7.95 |
| Independent | Hira Lal Mauria | 7,512 | 3.01 | ▲3.01 |
| Independent | Zahoor Khan | 4,945 | 1.98 | ▲1.98 |
| Independent | Jalil Ahmed | 4,568 | 1.83 | ▼29.06 |
| Independent | Rafiq Ahmed | 3,340 | 1.34 | ▲1.34 |
| Independent | Rewti Prasad | 2,764 | 1.11 | ▲1.11 |
| Majority | | 35,530 | 14.22 | ▲12.58 |
| Turnout | | 256,630 | 46.91 | ▼6.54 |
| Registered electors | | 547,076 | | ▲8.66 |
| INC gain from PSP | | Swing | ▲12.36 | |

(Source: Election Commission of India)

=== 1967 Indian general election ===
1967 Indian general election: Pilibhit
| Party | Candidate | Votes | % | ±% |
|---|---|---|---|---|
| PSP | Mohan Swarup | 70,927 | 28.24 | ▼1.38 |
| INC | Md Shamsul Hasan Khan | 66,823 | 26.6 | ▼0.82 |
| ABJS | Bhagwat Saran | 60,941 | 24.26 | ▲5.38 |
| SWA | Brijesh Singh | 14,883 | 5.93 | ▲5.93 |
| Independent | Krishn Sen | 13,706 | 5.46 | ▲5.46 |
| Independent | Munni Lal Patel | 10,493 | 4.18 | ▼29.86 |
| Independent | Ahmed Khan | 6,916 | 2.75 | ▲2.75 |
| Independent | Jalil Ahmed | 6,480 | 2.58 | ▲2.58 |
| Majority | | 4,104 | 1.64 | ▼0.56 |
| Turnout | | 266,993 | 53.45 | ▲3.22 |
| Registered electors | | 499,546 | | ▲15.62 |
| PSP hold | | Swing | ▲28.24 | |

(Source: Election Commission of India)

=== 1962 Indian general election ===
1962 Indian general election: Pilibhit
| Party | Candidate | Votes | % | ±% |
|---|---|---|---|---|
| PSP | Mohan Swarup | 59,624 | 29.62 | ▼20.92 |
| INC | Mukund Lal Agrawal | 55,192 | 27.42 | ▼7.44 |
| ABJS | Shiv Swaroop Mishra | 38,011 | 18.88 | ▲3.52 |
| CPI | Ishaq Sambhli | 36,482 | 18.12 | ▲18.12 |
| ABHM | Munni Lal Patel | 12,003 | 5.96 | ▲5.96 |
| Majority | | 4,432 | 2.2 | ▲13.48 |
| Turnout | | 211,738 | 50.23 | ▲9.73 |
| Registered electors | | 421,503 | | ▲7.33 |
| PSP hold | | Swing | ▼20.92 | |

(Source: Election Commission of India)

=== 1957 Indian general election ===
1957 Indian general election: Pilibhit
| Party | Candidate | Votes | % | ±% |
|---|---|---|---|---|
| PSP | Mohan Swarup | 80,809 | 50.54 | ▲50.54 |
| INC | Mukund Lal Agrawal | 55,746 | 34.86 | ▼8.25 |
| ABJS | Shri Harsh | 23,340 | 14.60 | ▲14.60 |
| Majority | | 25,063 | 15.68 | ▲14.59 |
| Turnout | | 159,895 | 40.94 | ▲1.73 |
| Registered electors | | 390,591 | | ▲15.77 |
| PSP gain from INC | | Swing | ▲50.54 | |

(Source: Election Commission of India)

=== 1951-52 Indian general election ===
1951-52 Indian general election: Pilibhit
| Party | Candidate | Votes | % | ±% |
|---|---|---|---|---|
| INC | Mukund Lal Agrawal | 55,612 | 43.11 | N/A |
| Socialist | Ram Chandra Singh Sadhu | 29,120 | 22.58 | N/A |
| KMPP | Jai Narain | 17,080 | 13.24 | N/A |
| Independent | Ram Bahadur | 12,191 | 9.45 | N/A |
| Independent | Puttu Singh | 9,399 | 7.29 | N/A |
| Independent | N. P. Sharma | 5,589 | 4.33 | N/A |
| Majority | | 26,492 | 9.34 | N/A |
| Turnout | | 128,991 | 39.21 | N/A |
| Registered electors | | 328,961 | | N/A |
| INC win (new seat) | | | | |

(Source: Election Commission of India)

== Pilibhit constituency at a glance ==
Election wise growth % of newly registered electors in the constituency (Source: Election Commission of India)
Election wise voters' turnout % in the constituency (Source: Election Commission of India)
- INC
- BJP
- SP
- BSP
- JD
- JP
- ABJS
- PSP
- SLP
- KMPP
- CPI
- CPIM
- ABHM
- AAP
- IND.

Election wise political parties' vote % in the constituency (Source: Election Commission of India)

| 1952 | 43.11% |
| 1957 | 50.54% |
| 1962 | 29.62% |
| 1967 | 28.24% |
| 1971 | 38.96% |
| 1977 | 71.32% |
| 1980 | 40.42% |
| 1984 | 63.84% |
| 1989 | 57.34% |
| 1991 | 30.86% |
| 1996 | 59.83% |
| 1998 | 55.99% |
| 1999 | 57.94% |
| 2004 | 37.75% |
| 2009 | 50.09% |
| 2014 | 52.06% |
| 2019 | 59.38% |
| 2024 | 52.30% |

Election wise winning party's vote % in the constituency (Source: Election Commission of India)
Political parties' success rate in Pilibhit constituency
1. BJP (6 terms) (33.3%)
2. INC (4 terms) (22.2%)
3. PSP (3 terms) (16.7%)
4. JD (2 terms) (11.1%)
5. JP (1 term) (5.55%)
6. IND (2 terms) (11.1%)
(Source: Election Commission of India)

== See also ==
- Pilibhit
- Pilibhit district
- Pilibhit Assembly constituency
- Barkhera Assembly constituency
- Puranpur Assembly constituency
- Bisalpur Assembly constituency
- Baheri Assembly constituency
- Uttar Pradesh Legislative Assembly
- List of constituencies of the Lok Sabha
