= Md Shamsul Hasan Khan =

Indian politician (born 1926)

Member of Indian Parliament
- In office 1977–1980
- Lok Sabha: 6th Lok Sabha
- Preceded by: Mohan Swarup
- Succeeded by: Harish Kumar Gangawar
- Constituency: Pilibhit

Personal details
- Born: 13 February 1926 Sherpur Village, Pilibhit, Uttar Pradesh, India
- Party: Bharatiya Lok Dal
- Spouse: Razia Bano Begam

Md Shamsul Hasan Khan (born 13 February 1926) was an Indian politician who was a Member of Parliament in the sixth Lok Sabha, elected from the Pilibhit constituency in 1977 as a candidate of the Bharatiya Lok Dal. Khan was son of Mohd. Badrul Hasan Khan, who was the nawab of Sherpur Reasat in the former princely state of Rampur.

== Early life and education ==
Khan was educated initially at the village school in Sherpur Kalan, of which he later became president. Subsequently, he attended Colonel Brown Cambridge School in Dehradun and then gained a degree from Cambridge University.

== Career ==
Khan joined the Indian National Congress as member of All-India Congress Committee (O) and was president of the District Congress Committee (O) for six years.

Khan was a prominent agriculturist from Pilibhit, and was also a member of Farmers' forum of India.

Khan was a renowned social worker in the Pilibhit, known for his support of educational and agricultural development in the Pilibhit District. He experimented and introduced new and scientific methods for the development of agriculture and horticulture, and his movement pioneered rubber plantation in the Tarai area of Pilibhit and Nainital districts.

Khan was elected as a Member of Parliament for the Sixth Lok Sabha from Pilibhit constituency with 71.32 per cent of the vote as a Bharatiya Lok Dal candidate, defeating a rival representing the Indian National Congress.

== Personal life ==
Khan married Razia Bano Begam. The couple had no children. He was succeeded by his younger brother Nawab Aijaz ul Hasan Khan.Mohd Aijazul Hasan khan passed away in the year November 2016.He has two sons and a daughter Ainum Aijaz Khan.The prestigious family is now succeeded by his Elder Son Nawazul Hasan Khan and younger son Viqarul Hasan Khan.
