= Parshuram Gangwar =

Indian politician and doctor

Dr. Parashuram Gangwar
- In office 10th Lok Sabha
- Preceded by: Menaka Gandhi
- Succeeded by: Menaka Gandhi
- Constituency: Pilibhit, Uttar Pradesh

Personal details
- Born: 5 December 1937 Barkhera, Pilibhit district
- Died: 30 October 2015 (aged 77) Pilibhit, Uttar Pradesh
- Party: Bharatiya Janata Party
- Spouse: Ishwarwati
- Children: Two sons and four daughters
- As of 18 June, 2006

Dr. Parashuram Gangwar was an Indian politician, and ex member of parliament, a doctor by profession. He was born in a small town of Barkhera. His father, Jhamman Lal, was a local former. In May 1957, he married Ishwarwati and has two sons and four daughters with her.

He qualified A.M.B.S. from Lalit Hari Ayurvedic College, Pilibhit, Uttar Pradesh, he was a Medical Practitioner and agriculturist. He served as a member of parliament for tenth Lok Sabha from Pilibhit constituency in 1991 and received 30.86% votes and defeated Menaka Gandhi of Janata Dal.
