= Swami Pravaktanand =

Indian politician

Member of the Uttar Pradesh legislative assembly
- Incumbent
- Assumed office March 2022
- Preceded by: Kishan Lal Rajpoot
- Constituency: Barkhera

Personal details
- Party: Bharatiya Janata Party
- Occupation: Politician

Swami Pravaktanand is an Indian politician. He is a member of the Bharatiya Janata Party and currently serving as a member of the 18th Uttar Pradesh Assembly, representing the Barkhera Assembly constituency.

== Political career ==
Following the 2022 Uttar Pradesh Assembly elections, he won the seat by defeating Hemraj Verma of the Samajwadi Party with a margin of 81472 votes.
