= Colonel Brown Cambridge School =

Boarding school for boys in Uttarakhand, India

Colonel Brown's Cambridge School

Location
- Dehradun, Uttarakhand; India; 30°19′18.75″N 78°3′28.99″E

Information
- School type: Boarding School for Boys
- Motto: Magna est Veritas (Truth is Great)
- Established: 1926
- Founder: Col. William Brown
- Headmaster: S. K. Tyagi
- Grades: 2nd to 12th
- Language: English
- Campuses: 62 acres
- Campus type: Residential
- Houses: Principal, Bursar & Headmaster
- Colors: Green, yellow and red
- Slogan: Eat Well, Sleep Well, Work Hard, Play Hard and Above All, Be a Gentleman!
- Sports: Athletics, Cricket, Football, Gymnastics, Hockey, Badminton, Martial Arts, Swimming, Table Tennis, Lawn Tennis, Chess, Yoga
- Nickname: CBS / CBCS / Brownians
- School fees: Rs. 623,000
- Affiliation: CISCE, ISC
- Website: www.colbrownschool.com

Colonel Brown Cambridge School is one of the oldest residential schools in Dehradun, Uttarakhand, India. It is an English medium school affiliated to the Council for the Indian School Certificate Examinations (CICSE) board of education. Many of the buildings are heritage structures. The school is run by the N.S. Educational Society which is registered under the Societies Registration Act XXI of 1860, and is recognised for the purpose of sending students for the ICSE.

== History ==
The school was established in 1926 by Colonel William Brown, an Irishman who had served both in the sphere of education and the British Army. After he retired from the army, Col. W. Brown did not wish to leave India—the country where he had served and which he had grown to love. He decided to devote his life to education. Ms. Oliphant was the school’s first principal.

=== Management ===
The school is run by the N.S. Educational Society, which is registered under the Societies Registration Act XXI of 1860, and is recognised for the purpose of sending up students for the ICSE.

In 1975, Smt. Krishna Kumari, Sanjay Singh, Abhai Singh and Smt. Indu Bala Singh came into partnership to run the school. In 1978, two of the partners registered the N.S. Educational Society. This led to a court case filed by the other partners on the grounds that they had not been included in the society.

== Academics ==
The school is affiliated to the Council for the Indian School Certificate Examination, New Delhi. The English language is the medium of instruction in the school. The school is divided into the Preparatory School (classes II III, IV, V, VI and VII) and the Senior School (classes VIII, IX, X, XI and XII). The Headmaster sees to the daily routine. The academic session commences in April each year.

== Sports and physical fitness ==
The following sports and games are offered:

- Athletics
- Cricket
- Football
- Gymnastics
- Hockey
- Badminton
- Track and Field
- Martial Arts
- Swimming
- Table Tennis
- Lawn Tennis
- Chess
- Yoga

== Notable alumni ==
The students of CBS are also called "Brownians", while the former students are called "Ex-Brownians" or simply "Old Boys". Colonel Brown Cambridge School has produced many prominent and notable people including:

- Vishwanath Pratap Singh – Prime Minister Of India
- Yahya Khan – President of Pakistan and Commander-in-Chief of the Pakistan Army
- Vijai Singh Shekhawat - Chief of Naval Staff of the Indian Navy
- Raj Kapoor - Actor, film producer and director
- Madan Mohan – Music director
- Virbhadra Singh – Chief Minister of Himachal Pradesh
- Hanut Singh - Lt. General of the Indian Army
- Md Shamsul Hasan Khan – Member Of Parliament
- Charanjit Singh - Two time Olympian and gold medal winner
- Joy Mukherjee - Actor and director
