= Arshad Khan (Indian politician) =

Indian politician

- अरशद ख़ान

15th Legislative Assembly of Uttar Pradesh
- In office Mar 2007 – May 2012
- Leader: Akhilesh Yadav

Personal details
- Party: Samajwadi Party

Arshad Khan (born 25 May 1953, Hindi: अरशद खां) is an Indian politician. He is a member of the Uttar Pradesh Legislative Assembly 2007 Constituency Puranpur Assembly constituency for Bahujan Samaj Party. He joined Samajwadi Party in 2023.

== Political career ==
In 2022, he lost the assembly Samajwadi Party elections.
