= Barkhera Assembly constituency =

Constituency of the Uttar Pradesh legislative assembly in India

Barkhera
- Constituency No. 128 for the Uttar Pradesh Legislative Assembly

Constituency details
- Country: India
- Region: North India
- State: Uttar Pradesh
- District: Pilibhit
- Total electors: 235039 (2022)
- Reservation: None

Member of Legislative Assembly
- 18th Uttar Pradesh Legislative Assembly
- Incumbent Swami Pravaktanand
- Party: Bhartiya Janata Party
- Elected year: 2022

Barkhera Assembly constituency is one of the 403 constituencies of the Uttar Pradesh Legislative Assembly, India. It is a part of the Pilibhit district and one of the five assembly constituencies in the Pilibhit Lok Sabha constituency. First election in this assembly constituency was held in 1967 after the "DPACO (1967)" (delimitation order) was passed in 1967. After the "Delimitation of Parliamentary and Assembly Constituencies Order" was passed in 2008, the constituency was assigned identification number 128.

== Wards / Areas ==
Extent of Barkhera Assembly constituency is KCs Neoria, Pauta Kalan & Nyoria Husainpur NP of Pilibhit Tehsil; KC Barkhera & Barkhera NP of Bisalpur Tehsil; PCs Athkona, Abhaipur M.Shahgarh, Karnapur, Itauria J.Biharipur, Dhakia Kesherpur, Shivnagar, Piparia Karam, Pachpera Prahladpur, Pachpera Garha, Prasadpur, Lalpur T.Madhautanda, Burhia J.Itauria, Raipur M.Rampur, Rampura M. Bhabsi, Shahgar & Sandai of West KC of Puranpur Tehsil.

== Members of the Legislative Assembly ==
#	Term	Name	Party	From	To	Days	Comments	Ref
01	04th Vidhan Sabha	Kishan Lal	Bharatiya Jana Sangh	Mar-1967	Apr-1968	402	–	
02	05th Vidhan Sabha	Kishan Lal	Bharatiya Jana Sangh	Feb-1969	Mar-1974	1,832	–	
03	06th Vidhan Sabha	Kishan Lal	Bharatiya Jana Sangh	Mar-1974	Apr-1977	1,153	–	
04	07th Vidhan Sabha	Kishan Lal	Janata Party	Jun-1977	Feb-1980	969	–	
05	08th Vidhan Sabha	Baboo Ram	Indian National Congress (I)	Jun-1980	Mar-1985	1,735	–	
06	09th Vidhan Sabha	Kishan Lal	Bharatiya Janata Party	Mar-1985	Nov-1989	1,725	–	
07	10th Vidhan Sabha	Sannu Lal	Independent	Dec-1989	Apr-1991	488	–	
08	11th Vidhan Sabha	Kishan Lal	Bharatiya Janata Party	Jun-1991	Dec-1992	533	–	
09	12th Vidhan Sabha	Kishan Lal	Bharatiya Janata Party	Dec-1993	Oct-1995	693	–	
10	13th Vidhan Sabha	Peetam Ram	Samajwadi Janata Party (Rashtriya)	Oct-1996	May-2002	1,967	–	
11	14th Vidhan Sabha	Peetam Ram	Samajwadi Party	Feb-2002	May-2007	1,902	–	
12	15th Vidhan Sabha	Sukh Lal	Bharatiya Janata Party	May-2007	Mar-2012	1,762	–	
13	16th Vidhan Sabha	Hemraj Verma	Samajwadi Party	Mar-2012	Mar-2017	–	–	
14	17th Vidhan Sabha	Kishan Lal Rajpoot	Bhartiya Janta Party	Mar-2017	Mar-2022	–	–	
15	18th Vidhan Sabha	Swami Pravaktanand	Bhartiya Janta Party	Mar-2022	Incumbent	–	–	

== Election results ==
=== 2027 ===
2027 Uttar Pradesh Legislative Assembly election: Barkhera
Party	Candidate	Votes	%	±%
INDIA				
NDA				
BSP				
NOTA	None of the above			
Majority				
Turnout				
gain from		Swing		

=== 2022 ===
2022 Uttar Pradesh Legislative Assembly election: Barkhera
Party	Candidate	Votes	%	±%
BJP	Swami Pravaktanand	151,771	63.8	+14.43
SP	Hemraj Verma	70,299	29.55	+7.53
BSP	Mohan Swaroop	9,383	3.94	−9.59
INC	Harpreet Pal Singh	2,702	1.14	
NOTA	None of the above	1,863	0.78	−0.32
Majority		81,472	34.25	+6.9
Turnout		237,878	73.46	+3.7
BJP hold		Swing		

=== 2017 ===
2017 Uttar Pradesh Legislative Assembly Election: Barkhera
Party	Candidate	Votes	%	±%
BJP	Kishan Lal Rajpoot	104,595	49.37	
SP	Hemraj Verma	46,665	22.02	
BSP	Dr. Shailendra Gangwar	28,674	13.53	
RLD	Jaidrath Alias Prabaktanand	22,631	10.68	
NOTA	None of the above	2,307	1.1	
Majority		57,930	27.35	
Turnout		211,878	69.76	

=== 2012 ===
2012 General Elections: Barkhera
Party	Candidate	Votes	%	±%
SP	Hemraj Verma	69,256	35.27	–
BJP	Swami Pravaktanand	38,882	19.8	–
BSP	Arshad Khan	29,823	15.19	–
	Remainder 19 candidates	58,418	29.75	–
Majority		30,374	15.47	–
Turnout		196,379	69.75	–
SP gain from BJP		Swing		

== See also ==
- Pilibhit district
- Pilibhit Lok Sabha constituency
- Sixteenth Legislative Assembly of Uttar Pradesh
- Uttar Pradesh Legislative Assembly
- Vidhan Bhawan
