= Our Party =

Our Party may refer to:

- OUR Party (Ownership, Unity and Responsibility Party), a political party in the Solomon Islands
- Uri Party, a defunct liberal political party in South Korea
- Our Party (Bosnia and Herzegovina), a political party in Bosnia-Herzegovina
- Our Party (Moldova)
- Apna Dal (disambiguation)
