= Sherpur Kalan =

Village in Uttar Pradesh, India

Coordinates: 28°33′N 80°25′E

Sherpur Kalan is a large village and a kasbah in Pilibhit district in the Indian state of Uttar Pradesh. It has an average elevation of 160 metres (520 ft). Commonly spoken languages include Urdu, Hindi, and Punjabi.
