= Puranpur Assembly constituency =

Constituency of the Uttar Pradesh legislative assembly in India

Puranpur
- Constituency No. 129 for the Uttar Pradesh Legislative Assembly

Constituency details
- Country: India
- Region: North India
- State: Uttar Pradesh
- District: Pilibhit
- Reservation: None

Member of Legislative Assembly
- 18th Uttar Pradesh Legislative Assembly
- Incumbent Babu Ram Paswan
- Party: Bhartiya Janata Party
- Elected year: 2022

Puranpur Assembly constituency is one of the 403 constituencies of the Uttar Pradesh Legislative Assembly, India. It is a part of the Pilibhit district and one of the five assembly constituencies in the Pilibhit Lok Sabha constituency. First election in this assembly constituency was held in 1962 after the "DPACO (1961)" (delimitation order) was passed in 1961. After the "Delimitation of Parliamentary and Assembly Constituencies Order" was passed in 2008, the constituency was assigned identification number 129.

== Wards / Areas ==
Extent of Puranpur Assembly constituency is KCs North, South, East, Jograjpur, PCs Amraiya Kalan, Keshopur T.Anandpur, Khamaria Patti, Chandupur, Takia Deenarpur, Puranpur Khas, Fazilpur of West KC, Kalinagar NP & Puranpur MB of Puranpur Tehsil. Largest Village Sherpur Kalan.

== Members of the Legislative Assembly ==
Term	Name	Party	From	To	Days	Comments	Ref
01st Vidhan Sabha	-	-	Mar-1952	Mar-1957	1,849	Constituency not in existence	
02nd Vidhan Sabha	-	-	Apr-1957	Mar-1962	1,800	Constituency not in existence	
03rd Vidhan Sabha	Mohan Lal Acharya	Indian National Congress	Mar-1962	Mar-1967	1,828	-	
04th Vidhan Sabha	Mohan Lal Acharya	Indian National Congress	Mar-1967	Apr-1968	402	-	
05th Vidhan Sabha	Har Narayan	Bharatiya Kranti Dal	Feb-1969	Mar-1974	1,832	-	
06th Vidhan Sabha	Harish Chandra	Bharatiya Jana Sangh	Mar-1974	Apr-1977	1,153	-	
07th Vidhan Sabha	Baboo Ram Prabhati	Janata Party	Jun-1977	Feb-1980	969	-	
08th Vidhan Sabha	Vinod Kumar	Indian National Congress (I)	Jun-1980	Mar-1985	1,735	-	
09th Vidhan Sabha	Vinod Kumar	Indian National Congress	Mar-1985	Nov-1989	1,725	-	
10th Vidhan Sabha	Har Narayan	Janata Dal	Dec-1989	Apr-1991	488	-	
11th Vidhan Sabha	Parmod Kumar	Bharatiya Janata Party	Jun-1991	Dec-1992	533	-	
12th Vidhan Sabha	Virendra Mohan Singh	Janata Dal	Dec-1993	Oct-1995	693	-	
13th Vidhan Sabha	Gopal Krishna Saxena	Samajwadi Party	Oct-1996	May-2002	1,967	-	
14th Vidhan Sabha	Dr. Vinod Tiwari	Bharatiya Janata Party	Feb-2002	May-2007	1,902	-	
15th Vidhan Sabha	Rajat Saxena	Samajwadi Party	May-2007	Mar-2012	1,762	-	
16th Vidhan Sabha	Peetam Ram	Samajwadi Party	Mar-2012	May-2017	-	-	
17th Vidhan Sabha	Babu Ram Paswan	Samajwadi Party	2017	2022	-	-	
18th Vidhan Sabha	Babu Ram Paswan	Bharatiya Janata Party	Mar-2022	Incumbent	-	-	

== Election results ==
=== 2027 ===
2027 Uttar Pradesh Legislative Assembly election: Puranpur
Party	Candidate	Votes	%	±%
INDIA				
NDA				
BSP				
NOTA	None of the above			
Majority				
Turnout				
gain from		Swing		

=== 2022 ===
2022 Uttar Pradesh Legislative Assembly Election: Puranpur
Party	Candidate	Votes	%	±%
BJP	Babu Ram Paswan	134,404	50.12	−1.94
SP	Arti Pal	107,828	40.21	+4.05
BSP	Ashok Kumar	16,060	5.99	−2.17
Independent	Deepti Verma	2,518	0.94	
NOTA	None of the above	1,543	0.58	−0.34
Majority		26,576	9.91	−5.99
Turnout		268,177	69.64	+2.85
BJP hold		Swing		

=== 2017 ===
2017 Uttar Pradesh Legislative Assembly Election: Puranpur
Party	Candidate	Votes	%	±%
BJP	Babu Ram Paswan	128,493	52.06	
SP	Peetam Ram	89,251	36.16	
BSP	K.K. Arvind	20,139	8.16	
NOTA	None of the above	2,246	0.92	
Majority		39,242	15.9	
Turnout		246,819	66.79	

=== 1997 ===
1997 General Elections: Puranpur
Party	Candidate	Votes	%	±%
SP	Gopal Krishna Saxena	103,847	52.98	−
BJP	Birendra Mohan	43,009	19.21	−
INC	Sukh Lal	16,773	6.42	−
	Remainder 15 candidates	40,279	21.39	−
Majority		30,838	13.77	−
Turnout		253,908	65.97	−
SP gain from BSP		Swing		

== See also ==
- Pilibhit district
- Pilibhit Lok Sabha constituency
- Sixteenth Legislative Assembly of Uttar Pradesh
- Uttar Pradesh Legislative Assembly
- Vidhan Bhawan
