= Vijay Samnotra =

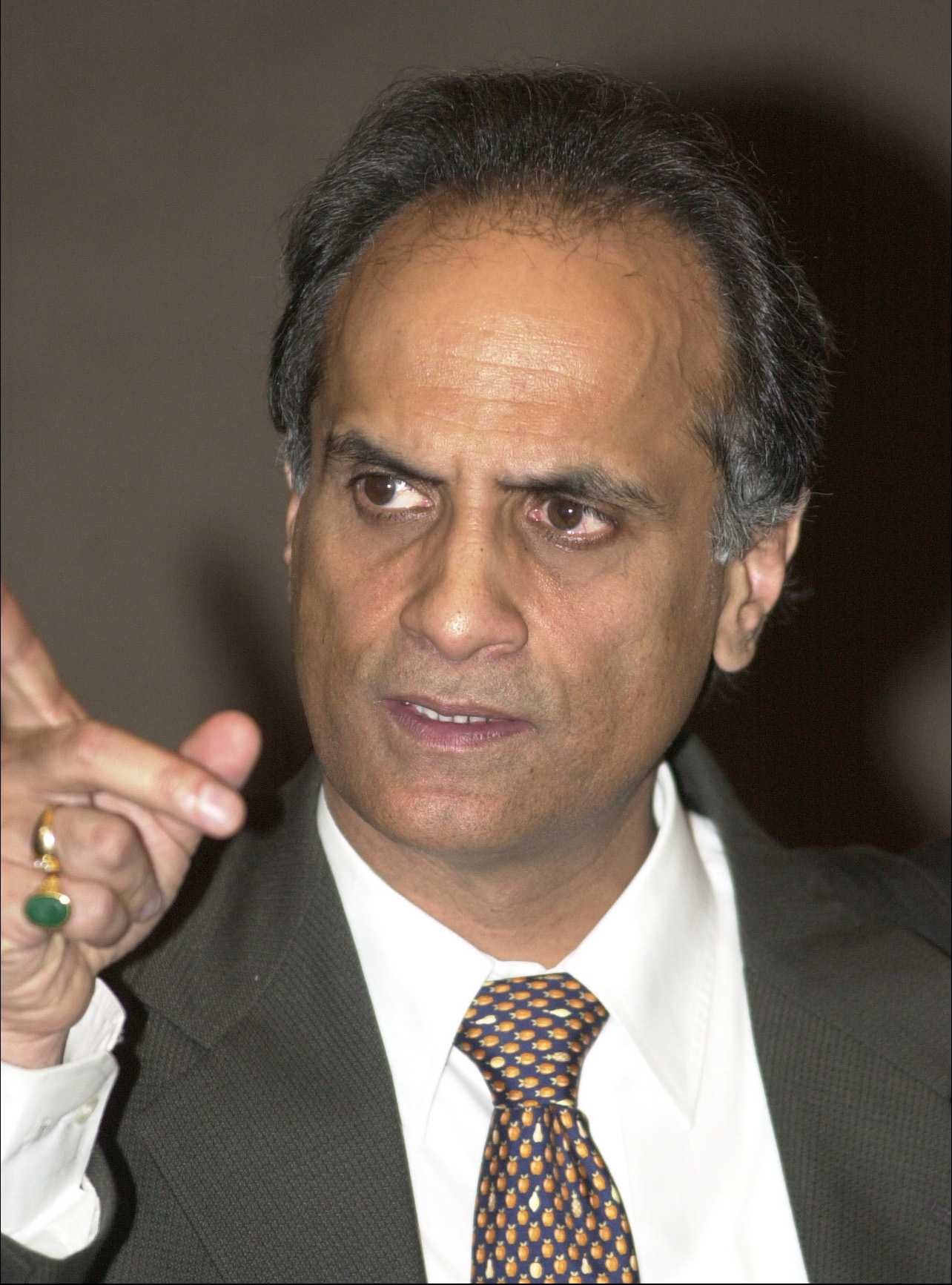

Head of United Nations Environment Programme India
- In office 2016–2019

Personal details
- Born: 6 September 1955(65)
- Education: St. Stephens' College, University of Delhi - Master of Arts (English Literature), Bachelor of Arts (Honors in English Literature), (May 1975 - Apr 1977) and (Apr 1972 -May 1975)

Vijay Samnotra is an Indian civil servant and former international career diplomat who served in the United Nations. He formerly served as head of the United Nations Environment Programme in India and as senior adviser to the United Nations resident coordinator on climate change and urbanization.

== Early life ==
Samnotra's parents and grandparents were Partition-era refugees to India from former West Pakistan, what is today the modern-day nation of Pakistan.

== Career ==
Samnotra joined the Central Secretariat Service after qualifying through the Civil Services Examination. He served as under secretary to Government of India and then served as private secretary to then Minister of State Maneka Gandhi. He later resigned from the civil service and joined the United Nations.

He served in the United Nations for 25 years and worked in the United Nations Office at Nairobi and United Nations Environment Programme. He also worked as speechwriter to two under-secretaries-general of the United Nations, assisting in conceptualizing the themes and information campaigns for World Environment Day and annual "Clean Up the World" campaigns.

In 2016, Samnotra established the India Country Office of the United Nations Environment Programme in New Delhi. As a senior advisor to the United Nations Resident Coordinator on Climate Change and Urbanization, he also contributed to collaborative projects and programmes for other autonomous associate agencies of the UN, including the Bali Strategic Plan on Capacity Building and Technology Transfer for quality assurance of UNEP's projects and programmes.

As a senior adviser to the United Nations Resident Coordinator in India on Climate Change and Urbanization, Samnotra coordinated the project on Circular Economy in India, leading to the publication of "Ahead of the Curve"; drafted the plan to make the United Nations in India carbon neutral; advised the UN resident coordinator on all issues relating to climate change and urbanization in his interactions with the United Nations Secretary-General's Office; and drafted the UN-India partnership proposal on climate change, innovation and urbanization.

== Awards ==
- INVC International Award for environmental diplomacy
