= Bisalpur Assembly constituency =

Constituency of the Uttar Pradesh legislative assembly in India

Bisalpur
- Constituency No. 130 for the Uttar Pradesh Legislative Assembly

Constituency details
- Country: India
- Region: North India
- State: Uttar Pradesh
- District: Pilibhit
- Total electors: 358,345 (2022)
- Reservation: None

Member of Legislative Assembly
- 18th Uttar Pradesh Legislative Assembly
- Incumbent Vivek Kumar Verma
- Party: Bharatiya Janata Party
- Elected year: 2022

Bisalpur Assembly constituency is one of the 403 constituencies of the Uttar Pradesh Legislative Assembly, India. It is a part of the Pilibhit district and one of the five assembly constituencies in the Pilibhit Lok Sabha constituency. First election in this assembly constituency was held in 1957 after the "DPACO (1956)" (delimitation order) was passed in 1956. After the "Delimitation of Parliamentary and Assembly Constituencies Order" was passed in 2008, the constituency was assigned identification number 130.

== Wards / Areas ==
Extent of Bisalpur Assembly constituency is KCs Deoria Kalan, Bisalpur, Bilsanda, Amrata, Bisalpur NPP & Bilsanda NP of Bisalpur Tehsil.

== Members of the Legislative Assembly ==
#	Term	Name	Party	From	To	Days	Comments	Ref
01	01st Vidhan Sabha	–	–	Mar-1952	Mar-1957	1,849	Constituency not in existence	
02	02nd Vidhan Sabha	Munendrapal Singh	Praja Socialist Party	Apr-1957	Mar-1962	1,800	–	
03	03rd Vidhan Sabha	Durga Prasad	Indian National Congress	Mar-1962	Mar-1967	1,828	–	
04	04th Vidhan Sabha	Munendrapal Singh	Praja Socialist Party	Mar-1967	Apr-1968	402	–	
05	05th Vidhan Sabha	Tej Bahadur Gangwar	Bharatiya Kranti Dal	Feb-1969	Mar-1974	1,832	–	
06	06th Vidhan Sabha	Tej Bahadur Gangwar	Indian National Congress	Mar-1974	Apr-1977	1,153	–	
07	07th Vidhan Sabha	Munendrapal Singh	Janata Party	Jun-1977	Feb-1980	969	–	
08	08th Vidhan Sabha	Tej Bahadur Gangwar	Indian National Congress (I)	Jun-1980	Mar-1985	1,735	–	
09	09th Vidhan Sabha	Tej Bahadur Gangwar	Indian National Congress	Mar-1985	Nov-1989	1,725	–	
10	10th Vidhan Sabha	Harish Kumar	Janata Dal	Dec-1989	Apr-1991	488	–	
11	11th Vidhan Sabha	Agys Ramsaran Verma	Bharatiya Janata Party	Jun-1991	Dec-1992	533	–	
12	12th Vidhan Sabha	Agys Ramsaran Verma	Bharatiya Janata Party	Dec-1993	Oct-1995	693	–	
13	13th Vidhan Sabha	Anis Ahmed Khan	Bahujan Samaj Party	Oct-1996	May-2002	1,967	–	
14	14th Vidhan Sabha	Anis Ahmed Khan	Bahujan Samaj Party	Feb-2002	May-2007	1,902	–	
15	15th Vidhan Sabha	Anis Ahmed Khan	Bahujan Samaj Party	May-2007	Mar-2012	1,762	–	
16	16th Vidhan Sabha	Agys Ramsaran Verma	Bharatiya Janata Party	Mar-2012	Mar-2017	–	–	
17	17th Vidhan Sabha	Agys Ramsaran Verma	Bharatiya Janata Party	Mar-2017	Mar-2022	–	–	
18	18th Vidhan Sabha	Vivek Kumar Verma	Bharatiya Janata Party	Mar-2022	Incumbent	–	–	

== Election results ==
=== 2027 ===
2027 Uttar Pradesh Legislative Assembly election: Bisalpur
Party	Candidate	Votes	%	±%
INDIA				
NDA				
BSP				
NOTA	None of the above			
Majority				
Turnout				
gain from		Swing		

=== 2022 ===
source: Election Commission of India

2022 Uttar Pradesh Legislative Assembly election: Bisalpur
Party	Candidate	Votes	%	±%
BJP	Vivek Kumar Verma	121,142	50.55	+4.12
SP	Divya Gangwar	70,733	29.52	
BSP	Anis Ahmed Khan	35,983	15.02	−5.32
Independent	Nitin Pathak	2,880	1.2	
NOTA	None of the above	1,238	0.52	−0.52
Majority		50,409	21.03	+2.64
Turnout		239,625	66.4	+2.39
BJP hold		Swing		

=== 2017 ===
2017 General Elections: Bisalpur
Party	Candidate	Votes	%	±%
BJP	Agys Ramsaran Verma	103,498	46.43	
INC	Anis Ahmad Khan	62,502	28.04	
BSP	Divya Gangwar	45,338	20.34	
CPI	Bheemsen Sharma	2,451	1.1	
RLD	Dr.Nagesh Chandra Pathak	2,127	0.95	
NOTA	None of the above	2,301	1.04	
Majority		40,996	18.39	
Turnout		222,924	64.01	
BJP hold		Swing		

== See also ==
- Pilibhit district
- Pilibhit Lok Sabha constituency
- Sixteenth Legislative Assembly of Uttar Pradesh
- Uttar Pradesh Legislative Assembly
- Vidhan Bhawan
