= Peetam Ram =

Indian politician (1951–2022)

Member of 16th Uttar Pradesh Assembly
- In office 2012–2017
- Succeeded by: Babu Ram Paswan
- Constituency: Puranpur

Personal details
- Born: 26 January 1951 Pilibhit, Uttar Pradesh, India
- Died: 4 February 2022 (aged 71) Bareilly, Uttar Pradesh, India
- Party: Samajwadi Party
- Spouse: Sahodra Devi
- Children: 3
- Parent: Jhajhan Lal (father)
- Profession: Politician and farmer

Peetam Ram (26 January 1951 – 4 February 2022) was an Indian politician. He represented the Puranpur constituency of Uttar Pradesh and was a member of the Samajwadi Party.

== Early life and education ==
Ram was born in Pilibhit District on 26 January 1951, to Jhajhan Lal. He attended Primary school and was literate. Ram belonged to the Scheduled caste community (Dhobi).

== Political career ==
He was a Member of the Legislative Assembly of Uttar Pradesh (MLA) from 1996 to 2007 and again from 2012 till 2017.

== Personal life and death ==
Ram was married to Sahodra Devi with whom he had a son and two daughters. He died from complications of COVID-19 at a hospital in Bareilly on 4 February 2022, aged 71.

== See also ==
- Puranpur (Assembly constituency)
- Sixteenth Legislative Assembly of Uttar Pradesh
- Uttar Pradesh Legislative Assembly
