= Pilibhit Assembly constituency =

Constituency of the Uttar Pradesh legislative assembly in India

Pilibhit
- Constituency No. 127 for the Uttar Pradesh Legislative Assembly

Constituency details
- Country: India
- Region: North India
- State: Uttar Pradesh
- District: Pilibhit
- Total electors: 3,68,537 (2017)
- Reservation: None

Member of Legislative Assembly
- 18th Uttar Pradesh Legislative Assembly
- Incumbent Sanjay Singh Gangwar
- Party: Bharatiya Janata Party
- Elected year: 2017

Pilibhit Assembly constituency (Hindi pronunciation: [piːliːbʱiːt̪]) is one of the 403 constituencies of the Uttar Pradesh Legislative Assembly, India. It is a part of the Pilibhit district and one of the five assembly constituencies in the Pilibhit Lok Sabha constituency. First election in this assembly constituency was held in 1957 after the "DPACO (1956)" (delimitation order) was passed in 1956. After the "Delimitation of Parliamentary and Assembly Constituencies Order" was passed in 2008, the constituency was assigned identification number 127.

== Wards / Areas ==
Extent of Pilibhit Assembly constituency is KCs Nagar, Amaria, Jahanabad, Pilibhit MB, Gularia Bhindara NP & Jahanabad NP of Pilibhit Tehsil.

== Members of the Legislative Assembly ==
Year	Member	Party
1957	Niranjan Singh	Indian National Congress
1962	Ram Roop Singh	Indian National Congress
1967	Babu Ram	Bharatiya Jana Sangh
1969	Ali Zaheer	Indian National Congress
1974	Dhirendra Sahai	Bharatiya Kranti Dal
1977	Dhirendra Sahai	Janata Party
1980	Charanjit Singh	Indian National Congress (I)
1985	Seyed Ali Ashrafi	Indian National Congress
1989	Riyaz Ahmad	Independent
1991	Balkrishna Gupta	Bharatiya Janata Party
1993	Balkrishna Gupta	Bharatiya Janata Party
1996	Raj Rai Singh	Bharatiya Janata Party
2000^	Balkrishna Gupta	Bharatiya Janata Party
2002	Riyaz Ahmad	Samajwadi Party
2007	Riyaz Ahmad	Samajwadi Party
2012	Riyaz Ahmad	Samajwadi Party
2017	Sanjay Gangwar	Bharatiya Janata Party
2022	Sanjay Gangwar	Bharatiya Janata Party

== Election results ==
=== 2027 ===
2027 Uttar Pradesh Legislative Assembly election: Pilibhit
Party	Candidate	Votes	%	±%
INDIA				
NDA				
BSP				
NOTA	None of the above			
Majority				
Turnout				
gain from		Swing		

=== 2022 ===
2022 Uttar Pradesh Legislative Assembly election: Pilibhit
Party	Candidate	Votes	%	±%
BJP	Sanjay Gangwar	125,506	48.08	−6.12
SP	Shailendra Gangwar	118,536	45.41	+8.43
BSP	Shane Ali	12,099	4.64	−1.13
NOTA	None of the above	1,188	0.46	−0.27
Majority		6,970	2.67	−14.55
Turnout		261,009	68.89	+0.56
BJP hold		Swing		

=== 2017 ===
2017 Uttar Pradesh Legislative Assembly Election: Pilibhit
Party	Candidate	Votes	%	±%
BJP	Sanjay Gangwar	136,486	54.2	
SP	Riyaz Ahmad	93,130	36.98	
BSP	Arshad Khan	14,532	5.77	
NOTA	None of the above	1,818	0.73	
Majority		43,356	17.22	
Turnout		251,819	68.33	

== See also ==
- Pilibhit Lok Sabha constituency
- Pilibhit district
- Sixteenth Legislative Assembly of Uttar Pradesh
- Uttar Pradesh Legislative Assembly
- Vidhan Bhawan
