= Varun Gandhi =

Indian politician (born 1980)

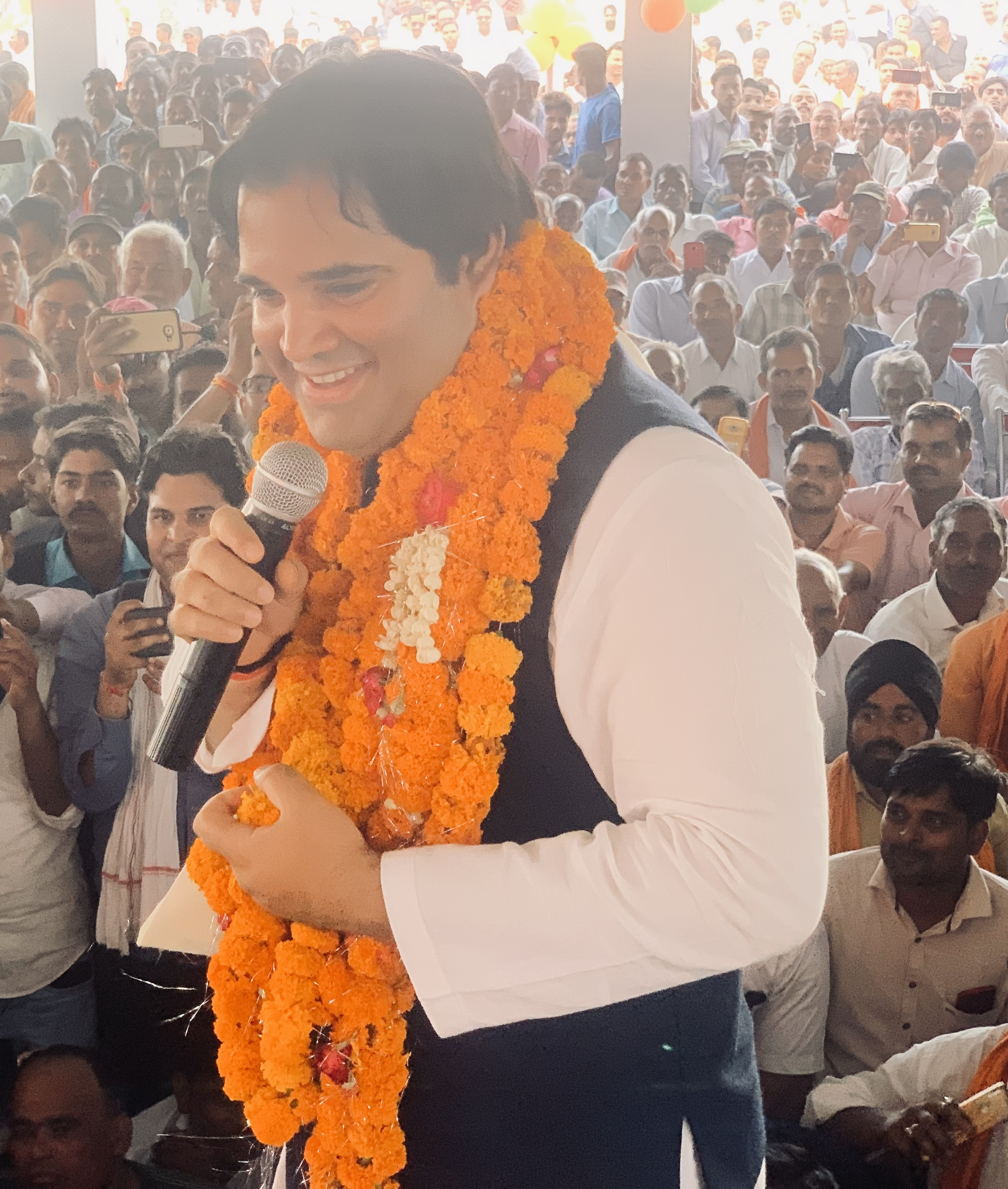
- Gandhi at a rally in 2019

Member of Parliament, Lok Sabha
- In office 23 May 2019 – 4 June 2024
- Preceded by: Maneka Gandhi
- Succeeded by: Jitin Prasada
- Constituency: Pilibhit, Uttar Pradesh
- In office 16 May 2014 – 23 May 2019
- Preceded by: Sanjay Sinh
- Succeeded by: Maneka Gandhi
- Constituency: Sultanpur, Uttar Pradesh
- In office 16 May 2009 – 16 May 2014
- Preceded by: Maneka Gandhi
- Succeeded by: Maneka Gandhi
- Constituency: Pilibhit, Uttar Pradesh

National General Secretary of the Bharatiya Janata Party
- In office 19 June 2013 – 16 September 2014

Personal details
- Born: Feroze Varun Gandhi; 13 March 1980 (age 46) New Delhi, Delhi, India
- Party: Bharatiya Janata Party
- Spouse: Yamini Roy Chowdhury (m. 2011)
- Children: Aadya Gandhi (daughter); Anasuya Gandhi (daughter)
- Parents: Sanjay Gandhi (father); Maneka Gandhi (mother)
- Relatives: See Nehru–Gandhi family
- Education: University of London
- Occupation: Politician; columnist; writer
- Source

Feroze Varun Gandhi (born 13 March 1980) is an Indian politician who has been a three time Member of Parliament for Lok Sabha from the Pilibhit constituency. He is a member of the Bharatiya Janata Party and was inducted into Rajnath Singh's team in March 2012 as General Secretary. He belongs to the Nehru–Gandhi family, which has occupied a prominent place in the politics of India since a time before the country's independence in 1947.

== Early life and education ==
Feroze Varun Gandhi was born in Delhi on 13 March 1980 to Sanjay Gandhi and Maneka Gandhi. He is the grandson of former Prime Minister of India, Indira Gandhi and the great-grandson of India's first Prime Minister, Jawaharlal Nehru. He is the nephew of former Prime Minister of India, Rajiv Gandhi and cousin of Rahul Gandhi and Priyanka Gandhi. Varun was born soon after Indira Gandhi regained power in the 1980 general election. Sanjay Gandhi died in a plane crash when Varun was three months old in June 1980. Indira was assassinated when Varun was four years old on 31 October 1984. Varun attended Rishi Valley School and the British School, New Delhi, where he ran for a position on the student council.

== Political career ==
=== Entry into politics ===
Varun Gandhi was first introduced to the Pilibhit constituency by his mother during the 1999 election campaigning. Maneka had been a part of the National Democratic Alliance (NDA) since earlier but she and Varun formally joined BJP in 2004. Varun Gandhi campaigned for the party in the 2004 elections, covering over 40 constituencies.

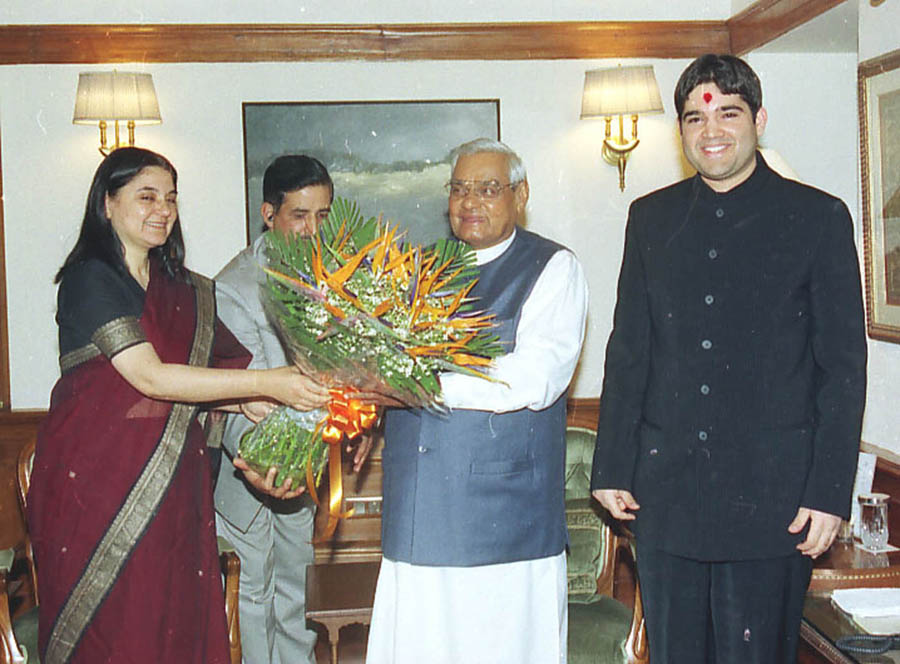
Maneka Gandhi and Varun Gandhi with 10th Prime Minister of India Atal Bihari Vajpayee in New Delhi on 2004.

In an interview to Stephen Sackur on BBC's HARDTalk in October 2005, Gandhi answered questions about the reasons behind his political affiliation and defended his father as someone who had helped revive the industrialisation of India by starting Maruti Udyog and whose strategy helped the Congress party's comeback after the first ever non-Congress Janata Party government following an electoral routing for the Indira Gandhi-government after Emergency, among many other things.

=== Increasing prominence within BJP ===
==== Elected as a Member of Parliament (2009-2014) ====
In the 2009 general election, the BJP decided to field Varun Gandhi as its candidate from the Pilibhit constituency instead of his incumbent mother Maneka Gandhi. He won the seat by receiving 419,539 votes and defeated his nearest contending candidate, V.M. Singh, by a margin of 281,501 votes. The victory was the strongest of any of the four Gandhi family candidates in the election: his mother Maneka Gandhi, aunt Sonia Gandhi and first cousin Rahul Gandhi. The security deposits of all other candidates, including those of V.M. Singh of the Indian National Congress and the Bahujan Samaj Party candidate Ganga Charan Rajput were forfeited. A case was filed against Gandhi for allegedly making a provocative speech about Muslims, at a meeting at Dalchand Mohalla area of Pilibhit; however, he was acquitted by in court in the matter. On 5 March 2013, a Pilibhit court acquitted Gandhi in the second hate speech case registered against him during the 2009 Lok Sabha election campaign.

In August 2011, Varun Gandhi strongly pitched for the Jan Lokpal Bill. Gandhi offered his official residence to activist Anna Hazare to hold his fast, after Hazare was denied permission by the government. When Hazare was jailed, Gandhi offered to table the Jan Lokpal Bill in Parliament. On 24 August, he went to Ramlila Maidan as a common man to support the cause of Anna Hazare, becoming the first politician to openly support the anti-corruption cause.

==== Appointment as National General Secretary of BJP ====
In March 2013, Rajnath Singh appointed Varun Gandhi as the national general secretary of the BJP. He became the youngest ever general secretary of the party. In May 2013, Varun Gandhi was made in charge of the BJP's affairs in West Bengal.

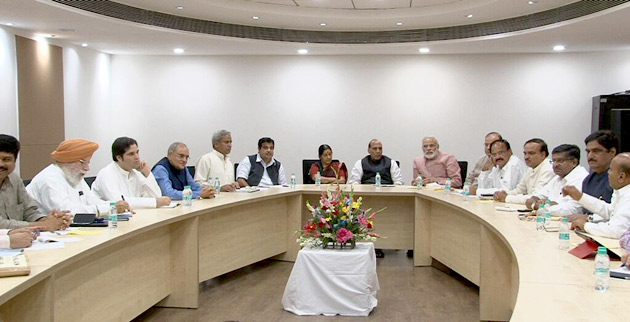
Bharatiya Janata Party election campaign meet on 1 August 2013 in Delhi

In August 2013, newspapers reported that Gandhi was the only MP in the country who had spent all of his MP Local Area Development Fund (MPLAD) before stipulated time. According to official sources, Varun Gandhi used his funds for the development in education, health and infrastructure activities. His proposals were worth more than the entire MPLAD fund thus ensuring the entire amount of 25 crore was spent during his tenure as a Member of Parliament.

Gandhi was highly critical of his cousin Rahul Gandhi as well as the then Uttar Pradesh Chief Minister Akhilesh Yadav. He was projected as a youth face of the party within Uttar Pradesh. In September 2013, Varun Gandhi accused the Samajwadi Party-led Uttar Pradesh government of pursuing the politics of appeasement, and said that its mistakes would lead to its collapse, after it denied permission to Varun Gandhi's rally in Agra just two days before it was scheduled to take place.

He also denounced Rahul Gandhi's infamous outburst against the controversial ordinance against convicted lawmakers, and said that it was an insult to the Prime Minister, who was abroad at the time, and therefore also disgraceful to the nation.

==== Second term as Member of Parliament (2014-2019) ====
In February 2014, Gandhi kickstarted his campaign for the 2014 election in Sultanpur. He gave an emotional speech to an enthusiastic crowd in Kadipur, and said that he had come to Sultanpur to fulfill his father's dreams.

In May 2014, Gandhi defeated Amita Singh from Sultanpur in Lok Sabha 2014 elections.

In March 2016, he introduced the Representation of the People (Amendment) Bill, 2016 in Lok Sabha.

==== Third term as Member of Parliament (2019-2024) ====
He contested from Pilibhit lok sabha constituency in 2019 general elections and won with approx 250,000 votes to become an MP for the third consecutive time.

=== Deterioration of Relationship with the BJP Leadership ===
Gandhi's relationship with the top leadership of the BJP declined and he became rather more critical of the policies of the party. It started after an October 2021 tweet in which he criticised the murder of farmer protestors in Lakhimpur Keri District, Uttar Pradesh, which had potentially been linked to a party politician. This resulted in his removal from the Party’s National Executive Committee.

== Columnist ==
Gandhi writes articles and policy papers for several national dailies and magazines in India, such as The Times of India, Hindustan Times, The Economic Times, The Indian Express, The Asian Age, The Hindu, Outlook among others. Gandhi writes the largest syndicated column in the country covering 21 newspapers—including Malayala Manorama, Lokmat, Rajasthan Patrika, Punjab Kesari, Amar Ujala, Sandesh, Bartaman, Sakshi—reaching more than 200 million readers.

== Writings ==
Gandhi wrote his first volume of poems, titled The Otherness of Self, at the age of 20, in 2000. His second volume of poems, titled Stillness was published by HarperCollins in April 2015. The book became the bestselling non-fiction book, selling over 10,000 copies in the first two days of its release.

In 2018, he released his book on the Indian rural economy titled The Rural Manifesto: Realising India's Future Through Her Villages. The book sold over 30,000 copies in ten days of its release.

His fourth book, The Indian Metropolis: Deconstructing India’s Urban Spaces, was released in February 2023.

== Personal life ==
Gandhi is married to Yamini Roy Chowdhury. His first daughter, Aadya Priyadarshini was born in 2011 but died when she was four months old. His second daughter, Anasuya was born in 2014.

== See also ==
- List of political families
- Maneka Gandhi
- List of Indian writers

Lok Sabha
Preceded by Sanjay Singh	Member of Parliament from Sultanpur; 2014 – present	Incumbent
