= Maneka Gandhi =

Indian politician (born 1956)

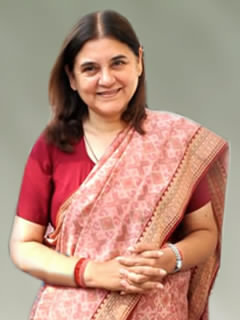
- Gandhi in 2014

Union Minister of Women and Child Development
- In office 26 May 2014 – 24 May 2019
- Prime Minister: Narendra Modi
- Preceded by: Krishna Tirath
- Succeeded by: Smriti Irani

Member of Parliament, Lok Sabha
- In office 23 May 2019 – 4 June 2024
- Preceded by: Varun Gandhi
- Succeeded by: Rambhual Nishad
- Constituency: Sultanpur, Uttar Pradesh
- In office 16 May 2014 – 23 May 2019
- Preceded by: Varun Gandhi
- Succeeded by: Varun Gandhi
- Constituency: Pilibhit, Uttar Pradesh
- In office 16 May 2009 – 16 May 2014
- Preceded by: Sarvraj Singh
- Succeeded by: Dharmendra Kashyap
- Constituency: Aonla, Uttar Pradesh
- In office 10 May 1996 – 16 May 2009
- Preceded by: Parshuram Gangwar
- Succeeded by: Varun Gandhi
- Constituency: Pilibhit, Uttar Pradesh
- In office 1989 – 1991
- Preceded by: Bhanu Pratap Singh
- Succeeded by: Parshuram Gangwar
- Constituency: Pilibhit, Uttar Pradesh

Union Minister of State (Independent Charge) for Programme Implementation and Statistics
- In office 18 November 2001 – 30 June 2002
- Prime Minister: Atal Bihari Vajpayee
- In office January 1990 – April 1990
- Prime Minister: Vishwanath Pratap Singh

Union Minister of State (Independent Charge) for Culture
- In office 1 September 2001 – 18 November 2001
- Prime Minister: Atal Bihari Vajpayee

Union Minister of Social Justice and Empowerment
- In office 13 October 1999 – 1 September 2001
- Prime Minister: Atal Bihari Vajpayee

Union Minister of State (Independent Charge) for Environment and Forests
- In office December 1989 – June 1991
- Prime Minister: Vishwanath Pratap Singh; Chandra Shekhar

Personal details
- Born: Maneka Anand; 26 August 1956 (age 70) New Delhi, Delhi, India
- Party: Bharatiya Janata Party (since 2004)
- Other political affiliations: Rashtriya Sanjay Manch (1983 – 1988); Janata Dal (1988 – 1998); Independent (1998 – 2004)
- Spouse: Sanjay Gandhi (m. 1974; died 1980)
- Children: Varun Gandhi (son)
- Relatives: See Nehru–Gandhi family
- Occupation: Politician; activist; environmentalist
- As of 27 May, 2014 Source: Government of India

Maneka Gandhi (also spelled Menaka; née Anand) (born 26 August 1956) is an Indian politician, animal rights activist, and environmentalist. She served as a member of the Lok Sabha, the lower house of the Indian parliament, and is a member of the Bharatiya Janata Party (BJP). She is the widow of Indian politician Sanjay Gandhi. Gandhi has held ministerial positions in four governments, most recently serving in Narendra Modi's government from May 2014 to May 2019.

In addition to her political work, Gandhi is an author, with several books on etymology, law, and animal rights.

== Personal life ==
Maneka Anand was born on 26 August 1956 in Delhi, India, into a Sikh family. Her father, Lt. Col. Tarlochan Singh Anand, served as an officer in the Indian Army, and her mother, Amardeep Kaur Anand, was the daughter of Sir Datar Singh. Maneka attended The Lawrence School, Sanawar and later studied at Lady Shri Ram College for Women. She subsequently studied German at Jawaharlal Nehru University in New Delhi.

Maneka first met Sanjay Gandhi in 1973 at a cocktail party hosted by her uncle, Major-General Kapur, to celebrate his son's upcoming wedding. Maneka married Sanjay, the son of Prime Minister Indira Gandhi, one year later on 23 September 1974.

During The Emergency of 1975–77, Sanjay rose to political prominence, and Maneka frequently accompanied him on tours, assisting with his campaigns. It is often said that during the Emergency, Sanjay had significant influence over his mother, Indira, and that the government was effectively run from the Prime Minister's House (PMH) rather than the Prime Minister's Office (PMO).

Maneka Gandhi founded the news magazine Surya, which later played a key role in promoting the Congress party after its defeat in the 1977 election following the Emergency.

Gandhi also went to court to fight an attempt by the government in power to confiscate her passport, winning a landmark decision on personal liberty in the case of Maneka Gandhi v. Union of India. The court found that "Democracy is based essentially on free debate and open discussion, for that is the only corrective of government action in a democratic setup."

In 1980, Gandhi gave birth to a son, Feroze, named after his paternal grandfather. Her mother-in-law added the name Varun. Maneka was widowed at just twenty-three years old, with Varun only 100 days old, when her husband died in an air crash.

== Early life and career ==
Maneka's relationship with Indira Gandhi deteriorated following Sanjay's death, with frequent arguments leading to an eventual rift. Maneka was ultimately asked to leave 1, Safdarjung Road, the prime minister’s residence, after a dispute with Indira. On April 3, 1983, she co-founded the Rashtriya Sanjay Manch with Akbar Ahmad, focusing on youth empowerment and employment. The party won four out of five seats in the Elections in Andhra Pradesh.

Gandhi later published The Complete Book of Muslim and Parsi Names, acknowledging her husband’s Zoroastrian heritage. She also published The Penguin Book of Hindu Names for Boys.

Her personal secretary was Vijay Samnotra, an Indian Civil Servant and former head of the United Nations Environment Programme.

In the 1984 Indian general election, Gandhi contested the Amethi constituency in Uttar Pradesh for the Lok Sabha but was defeated by Rajiv Gandhi. In 1988, she joined V. P. Singh's Janata Dal Party and became its General Secretary. Gandhi won her first election to Parliament in the 1989 Indian general election and served as the Minister of State for Environment in the V. P. Singh ministry.

In June 2020, Kerala police filed a case against Gandhi following complaints that her statements regarding the death of a pregnant elephant promoted communal hatred. Gandhi accused residents of the Muslim-majority district Malappuram, despite the elephant's death occurring in a different district, Palakkad, approximately 90 km away. BJP leaders, including Gandhi, focused on Malappuram in their statements. She claimed: “It’s a murder. Malappuram is famous for such incidents, it’s India’s most violent district. For instance, they throw poison on roads so that 300–400 birds & dogs die at one time.” Gandhi was accused of communalizing the incident, which would otherwise have been under the jurisdiction of the Department of Forests. A group named Kerala Cyber Warriors later hacked the website of Gandhi's organization, People for Animals, in protest.

== Activism ==
Maneka Gandhi is an environmentalist and animal rights advocate in India. She has earned international recognition and awards for her work. In 1995, she was appointed chairwoman of the Committee for the Purpose of Control and Supervision of Experiments on Animals (CPCSEA). Under her leadership, CPCSEA members conducted unannounced inspections of laboratories using animals for scientific research.

In 1996, Gandhi protested the opening of the first McDonald's restaurant in India, stating that "we don't need cow killers in India" to justify her opposition.

Gandhi has filed Public Interest Litigations that led to the replacement of municipal killing of homeless dogs with a sterilization program (commonly known as ABC programs), regulated the sale of airguns, and banned mobile or traveling zoos. She currently chairs the Jury of the International Energy Globe Foundation, which meets annually in Austria to award the year’s best environmental innovations. She also serves on the boards of Eurosolar and the Wuppertal Institute in Germany.

In 1992, Gandhi founded People for Animals, now the largest animal rights organization in India. Her sister, Ambika Shukla, is also a leading member. She is a patron of International Animal Rescue. As a vegan, she promotes this lifestyle for ethical and health reasons. She also hosted the weekly television program Heads and Tails, which highlighted the suffering of animals due to commercial exploitation, and later authored a book with the same title. Her other books cover Indian names. Additionally, she appeared in the documentary A Delicate Balance.

In September 2023, Gandhi advocated for protecting Dol Ka Badh forest in Jaipur, writing a letter to the chief secretary of Rajasthan with examples supporting the forest’s conservation.

== Electoral history ==
- 1984 – Lost to Rajiv Gandhi of Congress from Amethi for over 2.7 lakh votes, as an independent candidate.
- 1989–91 – Member of Lok Sabha from Pilibhit, elected as a Janata Dal candidate.
- 1991 – Lost to Parashuram of Bharatiya Janata Party from Pilibhit as a Janata Dal candidate.
- 1996–98 – Member of Lok Sabha from Pilibhit, elected as a Janata Dal candidate.
- 1998–99 – Member of Lok Sabha from Pilibhit, elected as an independent candidate.
- 1999–2004 – Member of Lok Sabha from Pilibhit, elected as an independent candidate.
- 2004–09 – Member of Lok Sabha from Pilibhit, elected as a Bharatiya Janata Party candidate.
- 2009–14 – Member of Lok Sabha from Aonla, elected as a Bharatiya Janata Party candidate.
- 2014–19 – Member of Lok Sabha from Pilibhit, elected as a Bharatiya Janata Party candidate.
- 2019–24 – Member of Lok Sabha from Sultanpur, elected as a Bharatiya Janata Party candidate.
- 2024 – Lost to Ram Bhual Nishad of Samajwadi Party from Sultanpur, as a Bharatiya Janata Party candidate.

== Positions held ==
- 1988–89 – General-Secretary, Janata Dal (J.D.)
- 1989–91 – Union Minister of State (Independent Charge), Environment and Forests
- January–April 1990 – Union Minister of State (Independent Charge), Programme Implementation
- 1996–97 – Member, Committee on Science and Technology, Environment and Forests
- 1998–99 – Union Minister of State (Independent Charge) Social Justice and Empowerment.
- 13 October 1999 – 1 September 2001– Union Minister of State, Social Justice and Empowerment (Independent Charge)
- 1 September 2001 – 18 November 2001 – Union Minister of State, Culture with an additional charge of Animal Care (Independent Charge) Programme Implementation and Statistics with added charge of Animal Care (Independent Charge)
- 18 November 2001 – 30 June 2002 – Union Minister of State, Programme Implementation and Statistics with an additional charge of Animal Care (Independent Charge)
- 2002–2004 – Member, Committee on External Affairs
- 2004 – Member, Committee on Health & Family Welfare, Member, Consultative Committee, Ministry of Environment and Forests
- 5 August 2007 – onwards Member, Committee on Health & Family Welfare
- 31 August 2009 – Became Member of Committee on Railways
- 23 September 2009 – Chairperson, Committee on Government Assurances
- 19 October 2009 – Member, General Purposes Committee
- 26 May 2014 – Union Minister of Women & Child Development

== In popular culture ==
Gandhi hosted Maneka's Ark, an environmental talk show which aired on the Indian national public broadcaster Doorarshan's DD National channel in the 1990s. She had earlier hosted Heads & Tails, an animal rights show, on the same channel.

== Awards ==
- Shining World Compassion Award along with a cheque for 20,000 dollars from Supreme Master Ching Hai International Association.
- Lord Erskine Award from the RSPCA, 1992
- Environmentalist and Vegetarian of the year 1994
- Prani Mitra Award, 1996
- Maharana Mewar Foundation Award, 1996 for Environmental work
- Marchig Animal Welfare and selling Prize, Switzerland, 1997
- Venu Menon Animal Allies Foundation Lifetime Achievement Award, 1999
- Bhagwan Mahaveer Foundation Award for Excellence in the sphere of Truth, Non-violence and Vegetarianism, 1999
- Dewaliben Charitable Trust Award, 1999
- International Women's Association Woman of the Year Award, Chennai, 2001
- Dinanath Mangeshkar Aadishakti Puraskar in the field of Environment and animal welfare, 2001
- Rukmini Devi Arundale Animal Welfare Award
- A.S.G. Jayakar award, 2008
- Human Achiever Award in field of Women Empowerment and Children Welfare by Mrs Caroline W/O Ambassador Of Namibia and Ms Sanorita Issac, founder & Chairperson, Human Achiever Foundation, India.
- Neuro Inclusive Politician (NIP) Award 2025 by Neurodiversity Foundation to recognize the ground breaking work in establishing The National Trust for Welfare of Persons with Autism, Cerebral Palsy, Mental Retardation, and Multiple Disabilities in 1999 - a first-of-its-kind law focused on securing rights for neurodivergent individuals in India.

== Books ==
- 1000 animal quiz, Calcutta : Rupa and Co., 1989, 201 p.
- Brahma's hair : the mythology of Indian plants, Calcutta : Rupa and Co., 1991, 175 p. With Yasmin Singh.
- The Penguin book of Hindu names, London : Penguin Books; New Delhi : Penguin Books India, 1992, 522 p. Latest edition in 2008.
- Dogs, dogs, dogs, New Delhi : Rupa & Co., 1994, 261 p. With Ozair Husain. Latest edition in 2004.
- The complete book of Muslim and Parsi names, New Delhi : Indus, 1994, 522 p. With Ozair Husain.
- Heads and tails, Mapusa, Goa, India : Other India Press, 1994, 182 p. On animal rights and animal rights.
- The rainbow and other stories, New Delhi : Puffin Books, 1999, 67 p. Children's short stories.
- The Penguin book of Hindu names for boys, New Delhi : Penguin Books, 2004, 429 p.
- The Penguin book of Hindu names for girls, New York : Penguin Books, 2004, 151 p.
- The Rupa book of animal quiz, Rupa & Co., 2004, 201 p.
- Animal laws of India, New Delhi, India : Universal Law Publishing, 2016, 1649 p. With Ozair Husain and Raj Panjwani.
- Sanjay Gandhi, New Delhi : Prestige Publishers, 2017, 244 p. With Himani Bhatia Narula.
- There's a monster under my bed! : and other terrible terrors, Gurgaon : Puffin Books, 2019, 54 p. Children's short stories. Illustrations by Snigdha Rao.

== See also ==
- Political Families of The World
- List of animal rights advocates

Lok Sabha
Preceded by Bhanu Pratap Singh	Member of Parliament for Pilibhit; 1989–1991	Succeeded by Parshuram Gangwar
Preceded by Parshuram Gangwar	Member of Parliament for Pilibhit; 1996–2009	Succeeded by Varun Gandhi
Preceded by Sarvraj Singh	Member of Parliament for Aonla; 2009–2014	Succeeded by Dharmendra Kashyap
Preceded by Varun Gandhi	Member of Parliament for Pilibhit; 2014–2019	Succeeded by Varun Gandhi
Preceded by Varun Gandhi	Member of Parliament for Sultanpur; 2019 – Present	Succeeded by Incumbent
Political offices
Preceded by Krishna Tirath; Minister of State (Independent Charge)	Minister of Women and Child Development; 26 May 2014 – 2019	Succeeded by Smriti Zubin Irani
