= The Indian Metropolis =

2023 book by Varun Gandhi

The Indian Metropolis: Deconstructing India's Urban Spaces is a 2023 book written by Varun Gandhi, published by Classy Publishing.

== Reception ==
Atul K. Thakur of Firstpost said The Indian Metropolis "is a must-read for all who believe in India’s potential".

Business Line's Kavya Suresh highlighted how the book "provides a detailed and holistic view of the various issues faced in Indian cities, ranging from poverty, healthcare, transport, planning policies, sustainability, gender inclusivity, economic vitality and urban crime." They further noted how the "analytical descriptions of systemic problems [... are] well backed with strong arguments, research, and statistics are juxtaposed against grounded human experiences and vignettes of daily life patterns. This paints a vivid picture of life in Indian cities and the drastically different experiences one goes through in the same place, often determined by social, economic and gender divides." Suresh indicated that "the effective communication of such complex urban conditions is a huge accomplishment in itself."

A.G. Krishna Menon of India Today also reviewed the book, and Gandi discussed it in more detail in The Hindu.
