= Babu Ram Paswan =

Indian politician

Member of the Uttar Pradesh legislative assembly
- Incumbent
- Assumed office 25 March 2022
- Preceded by: Peetam Ram
- Constituency: Puranpur

Personal details
- Party: Bharatiya Janata Party
- Occupation: Politician

Babu Ram Paswan is an Indian politician currently serving as a member of the 18th Uttar Pradesh Assembly, representing the Puranpur Assembly constituency. He is a member of the Bharatiya Janata Party.

== Political career ==
Following the 2022 Uttar Pradesh Assembly elections, he won the seat by defeating Ms. Aarti of the Samajwadi Party with a margin of 26,817 votes.
