= Kishan Lal Rajpoot =

Indian politician

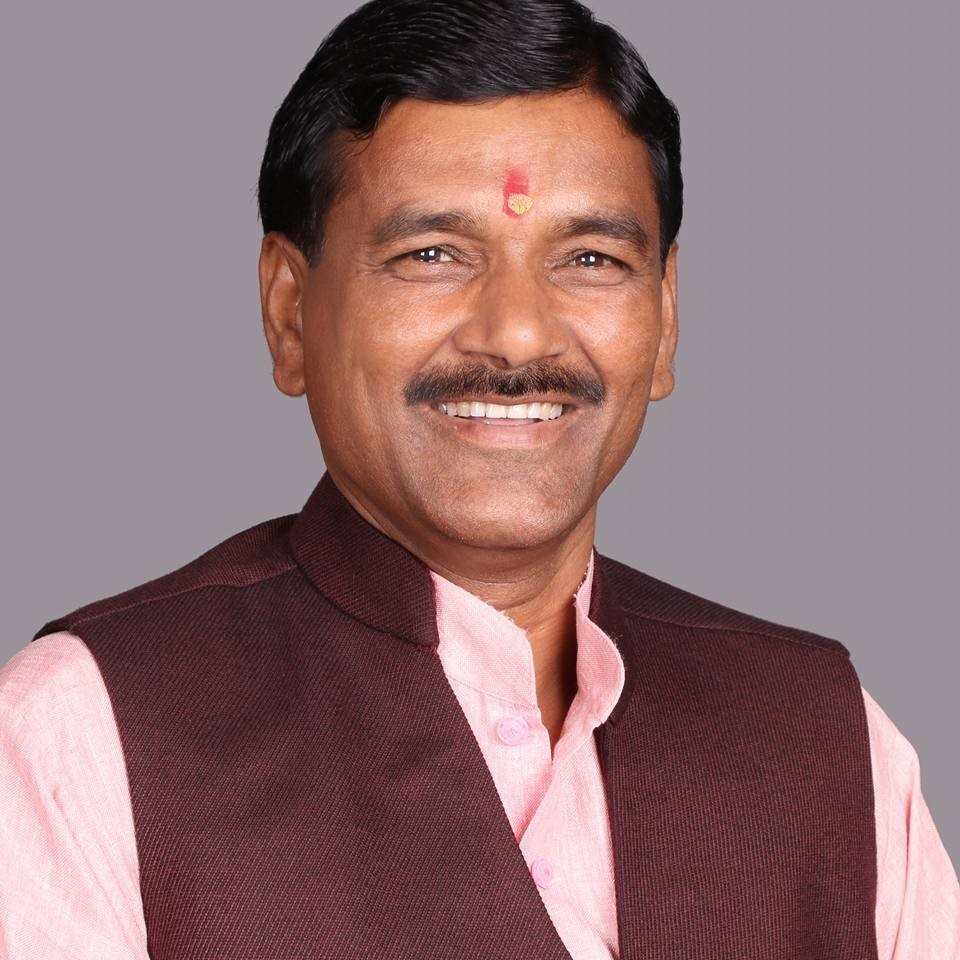

MLA, 17th Legislative Assembly
- Incumbent
- Assumed office March 2017
- Preceded by: Hemraj Verma
- Succeeded by: Swami Pravaktanand
- Constituency: Barkhera

Personal details
- Party: Bharatiya Janata Party
- Parent: Aase Ram
- Occupation: MLA
- Profession: Politician

Kishan Lal Rajpoot is an Indian politician in the Indian state of Uttar Pradesh.

== Political career ==
He represents the Barkhera constituency of Uttar Pradesh and is a member of the Bharatiya Janata Party. Since 2017, he has represented the Barkhera constituency.

== Posts held ==
#	From	To	Position	Comments
01	2017	2022	Member, 17th Legislative Assembly	

== See also ==
- Uttar Pradesh Legislative Assembly
