= A Rural Manifesto =

2018 book

A Rural Manifesto: Realising India's Future Through Her Villages is a book written by Varun Gandhi and published by Rupa Publications in 2018.

== Critical reception ==
Santosh Mehrotra of The Hindu wrote: "Through anecdotes, research and ground work, a BJP MP suggests ways to tackle agricultural distress and the way forward".

Panchanan Chattopadhyay of Assam University wrote: "A Rural Manifesto, is really a ‘grand narrative’ of India’s rural society to be reformed or to be revolutionised. It is a worthy collection for any university or college library. This book is an essential reading for administrators and policymakers of the country to understand the Indian villages."

Roshan Kishore of Hindustan Times wrote: "The book is a much needed political intervention to the collective effort which must be channelized behind this cause."
