= Gopal Krishna Saxena =

Indian politician (1951–2021)

Gopal Krishna Saxena (26 March 1951 – 19 April 2021) was an Indian politician.

== Early life and education ==
Gopal Krishna Saxena was born in Pilibhit district. He attended the Lucknow University and attained LL.B. degree.

== Political career ==
Saxena served as a member of the Uttar Pradesh Legislative Assembly for Puranpur from 1996 to 2002, as a member of the Samajwadi Party.

He lost his seat in the 2002 Uttar Pradesh Assembly Election to Vinod Tiwari of the Bharatiya Janata Party.

Saxena died from Covid-19 in 2021 at the age of 70.

== Posts held ==
| # | From | To | Position | Comments |
|---|---|---|---|---|
| 01 | 1996 | 2002 | Member, 13th Legislative Assembly | |

== See also ==
- Puranpur (Assembly constituency)
- Thirteen Legislative Assembly of Uttar Pradesh
- Uttar Pradesh Legislative Assembly
