= Apna Dal =

Apna Dal, translated as Our Party, may refer to:

- Apna Dal (Soneylal)
- Apna Dal (Kamerawadi)

== See also ==
- Our Party (disambiguation)
