= Mukund Lal Agrawal =

Indian politician

Member of Indian Parliament
- In office 1952–1957
- Lok Sabha: 1st Lok Sabha
- Succeeded by: Mohan Swarup
- Constituency: Pilibhit

Personal details
- Born: 16 January 1902 Pilibhit, British India
- Party: Indian National Congress
- Spouse: Ram Rakhi Devi
- Children: 2

Mukund Lal Agrawal (born 16 January 1902 - date of death unknown) was Member of Parliament in the first Lok Sabha from Pilibhit Constituency elected in 1952 as an Indian National Congress representative. His father was Kanhai Lal, a prominent sahukar and social worker in the city of Pilibhit.

Mukund Lal Agrawal attended High School and Intermediate at Government High School, Pilibhit, which is currently known as Drumand Boys' Government Intermediate College. After passing from there, he attended B.Sc. course from Bareilly College, in Bareilly and then Joined Agra College, Agra for L.L.B., He married Ram Rakhi Devi in 1917 at the age of 15 and had two sons with her.

Agrawal was an advocate and chairman of Pilibhit District Rural Development Association from 1938 till 1940. Apart from this he was also President of Managing Committee of the Rama Intermediate College, Pilibhit.

He was a member of the Indian National Congress (INC) and was imprisoned for participating in its activities in 1941 and 1942–43. He was also elected as member of Uttar Pradesh Assembly in 1941–46 under the British Raj.

In the 1952 general election, Agrawal was elected as the first Member of Parliament from Pilibhit constituency, gaining 43.11% of the vote as an INC candidate and defeating his rival contender from the Socialist Party, who gained 22.58% of the vote.
