= Agys Ramsaran Verma =

Indian politician

MLA, 17th Legislative Assembly
- In office Mar 2017 – Mar 2022
- Preceded by: Himself
- Succeeded by: Vivek Kumar Verma
- Constituency: Bisalpur

MLA, 16th Legislative Assembly
- In office Mar 2012 – Mar 2017
- Preceded by: Anis Ahmad Khan
- Succeeded by: Himself
- Constituency: Bisalpur

MLA, 12th Legislative Assembly
- In office Dec 1993 – Oct 1995
- Preceded by: Himself
- Succeeded by: Anis Ahmad Khan
- Constituency: Bisalpur

MLA, 11th Legislative Assembly
- In office Jun 1991 – Dec 1992
- Preceded by: Harish Kumar
- Succeeded by: Himself
- Constituency: Bisalpur

Personal details
- Born: 1 March 1949 (age 77) Shahjahanpur district
- Party: Bharatiya Janata Party
- Spouse: Kamla Devi Verma
- Children: 2 (including Vivek Kumar Verma)
- Parent: Girdhari Lal (father)
- Education: Bareilly College
- Profession: Politician

Agys Ramsaran Verma is an Indian politician and a former Member of the Uttar Pradesh Legislative Assembly. He represented the Bisalpur constituency of Uttar Pradesh and is a member of the Bharatiya Janata Party political party.

== Early life and education ==
Agys Ramsaran Verma was born in Shahjahanpur district. He attended the Bareilly College and attained Bachelor of Arts & Bachelor of Laws degrees.

== Political career ==
Agys Ramsaran Verma was a MLA for four terms. He represented the Bisalpur constituency and is a member of the Bharatiya Janata Party political party.

== See also ==
- Bisalpur (Assembly constituency)
- Sixteenth Legislative Assembly of Uttar Pradesh
- Uttar Pradesh Legislative Assembly
