= Bhanu Pratap Singh =

Indian politician

Member of the Indian Parliament for Pilibhit
- In office 1984–1989
- Preceded by: Harish Kumar Gangawar
- Succeeded by: Menaka Gandhi

Personal details
- Born: 3 February 1935 (age 91) Agras Village, Bareilly District, Uttar Pradesh
- Party: Indian National Congress
- Spouse: Gayatri Devi
- Children: 3

Bhanu Pratap Singh was Member of Parliament in the eighth Lok Sabha from Pilibhit Constituency elected in 1984 on Congress (I)'s ticket. Bhanu Pratap Singh is son of Daulat Rai Yadubansi, who was agriculturist by profession in Agras Village, which comes under limits of Bareilly district, Uttar Pradesh.

Bhanu Pratap Singh studied up to High School level in Bareilly and thereafter, he did his medical degree from Ayurved College, Pilibhit. He married Gayatri Devi in the month of May, 1956 and had two sons and one daughter from her. He is an agriculturist by profession and a Member of district Congress Committee, Bareilly since 1964. He was elected as General Secretary, district Congress Committee for 1967–72. He has also served as Deputy Minister for Agriculture, Dairy and Animal Husbandry, Government of Uttar Pradesh in 1972 and Minister of State for Agriculture, Animal Husbandry and Sugarcane in 1980 and Cabinet Minister for Sugarcane, Excise and Revenue and Agriculture, Dairy, Gardening and Excise Department in 1980. He was the Member of Uttar Pradesh Legislative Assembly for 1969-74 and 1980–84.

He is famous for giving training in weapons to the public during the Sino-Indian War and for having organised seminars on Family Planning, Rural Development and Health at various places. He is dedicated to the upliftment of old widows and poor children, patron of many schools; he is considered to be the leader of farmers for the more than 20 years and took initiative in agricultural development and seed-testing in the area.

He likes to read literature on Indian culture, training in seed production and animal husbandry, he is working on cow breeding and milk production, also reading and collecting literature on cow breeding. He is a follower of hockey and football, he also has served as captain and umpire during his college days. He is also a marksman of 122 Rifle—Pistol (award winner) and President of the Farm Club Bareilly for more than 10 years and member of the clubs affiliated thereto, General Secretary, Bareilly Rifle Club.

He was elected as eighth Member of Parliament from Pilibhit Constituency with 63.84% votes on Congress (I)'s ticket and defeated his rival contender who was from Bharatiya Lok Dal and received 23.39% votes in the general election held in 1984.
