= Harish Kumar Gangawar =

Member of Indian Parliament
- In office 1980–1984
- Lok Sabha: 7th Lok Sabha
- Preceded by: Md Shamsul Hasan Khan
- Succeeded by: Bhanu Pratap Singh
- Constituency: Pilibhit

Personal details
- Born: 25 January 1930 (age 96) Teolia Village, Bareilly, Uttar Pradesh
- Died: Unknown Unknown
- Party: Congress (I)
- Spouse: Shanti Lata Gangwar
- Children: 3 sons and 2 daughters

Harish Kumar Gangwar was a Member of Parliament in the seventh Lok Sabha from Pilibhit constituency elected in 1980 on Indian National Congress ticket. Harish Kumar Gangawar was son of Baldev Prasad Gangwar, who was Agriculturist by profession in Teolia Village, comes under limits of Bareilly district, Uttar Pradesh.

Gangawar attended primary school in Teolia Village, and attended High School and Intermediate class in Bareilly city, after which he joined Bareilly College, Bareilly for Bachelor of Arts. After passing the same he joined Masters of Arts from Bareilly College, Bareilly. after that he successfully completed B.T. course from Bareilly College, Bareilly. Then he joined L.L.B. from Bareilly College, Bareilly and after completing the same, he started practising Law as a profession in the city of Bareilly.

At initial, he joined Bhartiya Jan Sangh and elected for President of Gram Sabha, Teolia village several times during 1950–60. but with due course of time, he joined Congress (I), and elected for Uttar Pradesh Legislative Assembly in 1962 form Bareilly legislative seat and again in 1974 from the same Bareilly legislative seat.

He was elected as seventh Member of Parliament from Pilibhit constituency with 40.42% votes on Congress (I)'s ticket and defeated his rival contender who was from Janata Party and received 25.34% votes in the general election held in 1980. Apart from this, he was ex-director of Sugar Cane Co-operative Society, Bareilly and Manager of Patel Inter College in Dhaura town in Bareilly district. He also held the position of Member in the Committee on Subordinate Legislation.
