= Riyaz Ahmad =

Indian politician (1958–2021)

MLA, 16th Legislative Assembly
- In office Mar 2012 – Mar 2017
- Succeeded by: Sanjay Singh Gangwar
- Constituency: Pilibhit

MLA, 15th Legislative Assembly
- In office May 2007 – Mar 2012
- Preceded by: Himself
- Succeeded by: Himself
- Constituency: Pilibhit

MLA, 14th Legislative Assembly
- In office Feb 2002 – May 2007
- Preceded by: Raj Rai Singh
- Succeeded by: Himself
- Constituency: Pilibhit

MLA, 10th Legislative Assembly
- In office Dec 1990 – Apr 1991
- Preceded by: Seyed Ali Ashrafi
- Succeeded by: B. K. Gupta
- Constituency: Pilibhit

MLA, 08th Legislative Assembly
- In office Jun 1980 – Mar 1985
- Preceded by: Jitendra Kumar Agarwal
- Succeeded by: Muid Ahmad
- Constituency: Sultanpur

Personal details
- Born: 3 November 1958 Pilibhit district, Uttar Pradesh, India
- Died: 29 April 2021 (aged 62)
- Party: Samajwadi Party
- Spouse: Amna Begum
- Children: 4
- Education: Kumaun University & University of Allahabad
- Profession: Politician, farmer and businessperson

Riyaz Ahmad (3 November 1958 – 29 April 2021) was an Indian politician and a member of the Sixteenth Legislative Assembly of Uttar Pradesh in India. He represented the Pilibhit constituency of Uttar Pradesh and was a member of the Samajwadi Party political party.

== Early life and education ==
Riyaz Ahmad was born in the Pilibhit district. He attended the Kumaun University & University of Allahabad and attained MA & M.Com degrees.

== Political career ==
Riyaz Ahmad was a MLA for five terms. He represented the Pilibhit constituency and was a member of the Samajwadi Party political party.

== Posts held ==
#	From	To	Position	Comments
01	2012	2017	Member, 16th Legislative Assembly	
02	2007	2012	Member, 15th Legislative Assembly	
03	2002	2007	Member, 14th Legislative Assembly	
04	1989	1991	Member, 10th Legislative Assembly	Contested as Independent candidate.
05	1980	1985	Member, 08th Legislative Assembly	Contested as Independent candidate.

== See also ==
- Sultanpur (Assembly constituency)
- Uttar Pradesh Legislative Assembly
