= Mohan Swarup =

Kunwar Mohan Swarup

Member of Indian Parliament
- In office 1957–1977
- Lok Sabha: 2nd, 3rd, 4th, 5th
- Preceded by: Mukund Lal Agrawal
- Succeeded by: Md Shamsul Hasan Khan
- Constituency: Pilibhit

Personal details
- Born: 18 February 1918 Village Sahora, Bareilly, Uttar Pradesh
- Died: 15 June 1978 (aged 60)
- Party: Indian National Congress
- Spouse: Shanti Devi
- Children: 4 sons and 2 daughters

Kunwar Mohan Swarup (18 February 1918 - 15 June 1978 ) was Member of Parliament in the second (1957), third (1962), and fourth (1967) Lok Sabha on Praja Socialist Party's ticket and again in fifth Lok Sabha (1971–77) as a member of Congress Party from Pilibhit Constituency. In 1977, he contested the seat again on Indian National Congress's ticket but lost to Janata Party in the anti-Indira wave. Swarup was son of Kunwar Shambhu Sahai, a prominent freedom fighter and social worker from Sahora village.

== Early life and education ==
Mohan Swarup was educated at Bareilly College, in Bareilly and married Shanti Devi in May 1940 at the age of 22. The couple had four sons and two daughters.

== Career ==
Swarup was associated with the Praja Socialist Party (PSP) until 1970. He held various posts and committee memberships.

=== Positions held ===
- District Board, Bareilly
- Zila Parishad, Bareilly
- District Bhoodan Samiti, Bareilly
- Managing Committee, Kr. Dhakan Lal Vidya Mandir College, Sahora, Bareilly
- Bharat Sewak Samaj, Bareilly
- National Railway Users' Consultative Committee
- Goodwill Mission to Ghana, Liberia, Sierra Leone and Nigeria
- Pradhan, Gram Sabha, Sahora, Bareilly
- Sarpanch, Nyaya Panchayat, Sahora, Bareilly
- District Secretary, P.S.P., Bareilly
- President, P. & T. Employees Union, Pilibhit
- Secretary, All India Caterers' Union
- Public Accounts Committee
- Estimates Committee
- Consultative Committee for Works and Housing

He was elected as the second Member of Parliament from Pilibhit Constituency with 50.54% votes as a PSP member, defeating a rival from the Indian National Congress (INC) who got 34.86% of the vote in the 1957 general election. He was elected again from the constituency with 29.62% of the vote, defeated the INC contender's 27.42% in the 1962 general election. He was re-elected in the 1967 general election with 28.24% vote, still as a PSP representative from Pilibhit, defeated his rival from the INC, who got 24.26% votes. In the 1972 general election, he contested as an INC candidate in Pilibhit and won the seat with 38.96% votes and defeated his nearest contestant who was from Indian National Congress and received only 29.37% votes.

== Personal life ==
Swarup travelled widely around the world to learn new ideas. He was also interested in shooting, swimming, horse-riding, painting, writing and photography.
