= Vivek Kumar Verma =

Indian politician

Member of the Uttar Pradesh legislative assembly
- Incumbent
- Assumed office March 2022
- Preceded by: Agys Ramsaran Verma
- Constituency: Bisalpur

Personal details
- Born: 1969 or 1970 (age 56–57)
- Party: Bharatiya Janata Party
- Occupation: Politician

Vivek Kumar Verma is an Indian politician and Member of the 18th Uttar Pradesh Assembly, representing Bisalpur as of March 2022. He is a member of BJP and won the election by a margin of over fifty thousand votes against INC, Samajwadi Party and AAP. He is the son of Agys Ramsaran Verma, who was the MLA for Bisalpur for four terms.

== Election results ==
source: Election Commission of India, Oneindia

2022 Uttar Pradesh Legislative Assembly election: Bisalpur
Party	Candidate	Votes	%	±%
BJP	Vivek Kumar Verma	121142	50.55	
SP	Divya Gangwar	70733	29.52	
BSP	Anis Ahmed Khan Phool Babu	35983	15.02	
	Nitin Pathak	2880	1.20	
CPI	Bheemsen Sharma	1774	0.74	
INC	Sikha Pandey	1382	0.58	
NOTA	None of the Above	1238	0.52	
Turnout		239625	61.33	
