= Hemraj Verma =

Indian politician

MLA, 16th Legislative Assembly
- In office March 2012 – March 2017
- Preceded by: Sukh Lal
- Succeeded by: Kishan Lal Rajpoot
- Constituency: Barkhera

Personal details
- Born: 8 July 1976 (age 50) Pilibhit district
- Party: Samajwadi Party
- Spouse: Suman Devi (wife)
- Children: 02 sons
- Parent: Raja Ram Verma (father)
- Education: Upadhi Mahavidyalaya, Pilibhit
- Profession: Politician & farmer

Hemraj Verma is an Indian politician and a member of the Sixteenth Legislative Assembly of Uttar Pradesh in India. He represented the Barkhera constituency of Uttar Pradesh and is a member of the Bhartiya Janta party political party.

== Early life and education ==
Hemraj Verma was born in Pilibhit district. He attended the Upadhi Mahavidyalaya, Pilibhit and attained bachelor's degree.

== Political career ==
Hemraj Verma has been a MLA for one term. He represented the Barkhera constituency and is a member of the Samajwadi Party political party.

He lost his seat in the 2017 Uttar Pradesh Assembly election to Kishan Lal Rajpoot of the Bharatiya Janata Party.

== Posts held ==
#	From	To	Position	Comments
01	2012	2017	Member, 16th Legislative Assembly	

== See also ==
- Barkhera (Assembly constituency)
- Sixteenth Legislative Assembly of Uttar Pradesh
- Uttar Pradesh Legislative Assembly
