= Sanjay Singh Gangwar =

Indian politician

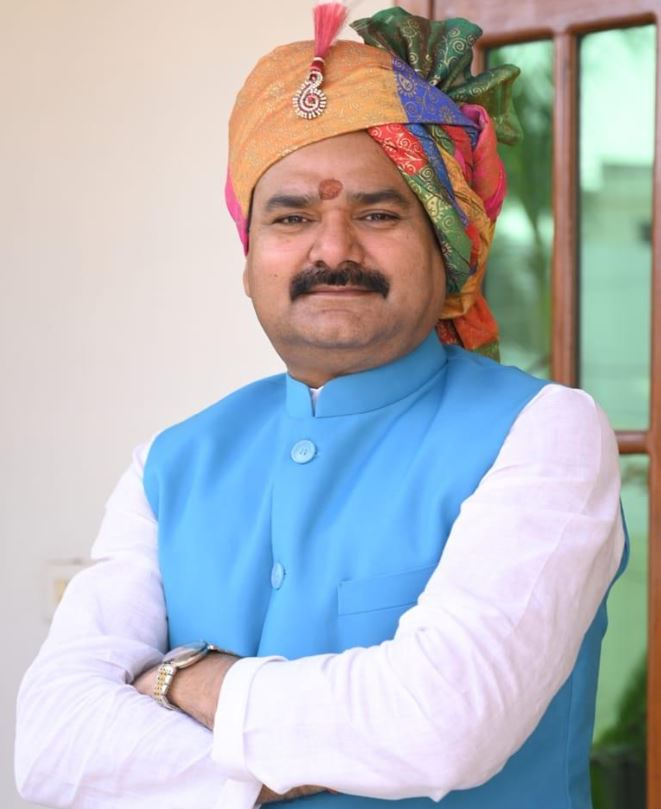

Minister of State Government of Uttar Pradesh
- Incumbent
- Assumed office 25 March 2022
- Ministry and Departments: Sugarcane Development; Sugar Mills
- Preceded by: Suresh Pasi

Member of Uttar Pradesh Legislative Assembly
- Incumbent
- Assumed office March 2017
- Preceded by: Riyaz Ahmad
- Constituency: Pilibhit

Personal details
- Born: Sanjay Singh Gangwar; 10 April 1977 (age 49) Pilibhit, Uttar Pradesh
- Party: Bharatiya Janata Party
- Spouse: Rashmi Singh Gangwar
- Parent: Babu Ram Gangwar (father)
- Education: Chhatrapati Shahu Ji Maharaj University

Sanjay Singh Gangwar (born 10 April 1977) is an Indian politician and a member of Uttar Pradesh Legislative Assembly from Pilibhit since March 2017 representing Bharatiya Janata Party. He is also a Minister of State in Second Yogi Adityanath ministry. He holds the portfolio of State Minister of Sugarcane Development, Sugar Mills.

== Controversy ==
On 17 December 2022, a special court in Pilibhit sentenced Sanjay Singh Gangwar to three months in jail for election code violations dating back to the 2012 assembly elections. Gangwar, a Bharatiya Janata Party (BJP) legislator from Pilibhit and former member of the Bahujan Samaj Party (BSP), was fined Rs 2,000 for each of two cases. This conviction makes him the second minister in the Yogi 2.0 government to be found guilty. The court found Gangwar guilty under Section 127-A of the Representation of People’s Act, which prohibits the printing or publishing of election materials without proper identification of the printer or publisher. The cases stem from January 2012, when campaign materials were found in Pilibhit without the required information. Despite the conviction, the court granted Gangwar interim bail for 30 days, allowing him time to appeal under Section 389 (3) of the Code of Criminal Procedure.

Singh made controversial claims, stating that cleaning and lying in cowsheds can cure cancer, and interacting with cows can significantly reduce blood pressure. During the inauguration of a cow shelter in his Pilibhit constituency, he said that petting cows could reduce a blood pressure patient’s medication dosage by half within 10 days. He also urged people to celebrate occasions like marriage anniversaries and children’s birthdays in cow shelters, encouraging them to donate fodder as well. Singh further claimed that lighting cow dung cakes could provide relief from mosquitoes.
